= Reuben discography =

The discography of Reuben.

== Discography ==
=== Albums ===
- Racecar Is Racecar Backwards – June 2004 – #88
- Very Fast Very Dangerous – September 2005 – #87
- In Nothing We Trust – 25 June 2007 – #102

=== Compilations ===
- We Should Have Gone To University – July 2009

=== EPs ===
- Pilot EP – January 2001
- TwoByThree EP – March 2008

=== Demos ===
- Me Vs. You – 1998 – As 'Angel'
- Death of a Star – 1999 – As 'Angel'
- Betrayed Demo – 1999 – As 'Angel'
- Hand Over Fist – 2000 – As 'Angel'

=== Singles ===
Date	Single	UK	UK Rock	Album
2002	"Scared of the Police"	87	—	Non-album singles
2002	"Stux (Tell Me It's Alright)"	86	22	Non-album singles
2003	"Let's Stop Hanging Out"	90	7	Racecar Is Racecar Backwards
2003	"Stuck in My Throat"	77	12	Racecar Is Racecar Backwards
2004	"Freddy Kreuger"	53	6	Racecar Is Racecar Backwards
2004	"Moving to Blackwater"	59	—	Racecar Is Racecar Backwards
2005	"Blamethrower"	—	—	Very Fast Very Dangerous
2005	"A Kick in the Mouth"	58	—	Very Fast Very Dangerous
2005	"Keep It to Yourself"	62	4	Very Fast Very Dangerous
2006	"Every Time a Teenager Listens to Drum & Bass a Rockstar Dies"	—	—	Very Fast Very Dangerous
2007	"Blood, Bunny, Larkhall"	—	—	In Nothing We Trust
2007	"Deadly Lethal Ninja Assassin"	—	1	In Nothing We Trust
2007	"Christmas Is Awesome"	—	—	Non-album single
2008	"Cities on Fire"	—	—	In Nothing We Trust
"—" denotes a title that did not chart.

=== DVD ===
What Happens in Aldershot Stays in Aldershot

- Recorded: January–December 2006
- Released: 19 March 2007
- Label: Hideous Records
- Contains complete footage of the London Mean Fiddler, 2006 show and an hour-long documentary film.

=== Appearances on compilations ===
Information
Live With Attitude Vol.1
- Released: November 1999
- Featured song: Stux, Ways of Staying Pure, Push & Dreyfuss

Released when the band were known as 'Angel'

Farnborough Groove Volume 8
- Released: 1999
- Featured song: Victim

Released when the band were known as 'Angel' Farnborough Groove is a compilation of the Farnborough local music scene

Snakebite City Ten
- Released: 2002
- Featured song: Shambles
Please Take Off Your Shoes Before Entering
- Released: 12 March 2001
- Featured song: Miffy in Auschwitz

Badmusic compilation

Mosh & Go
- Released: October 2001
- Featured song: Wooden Boy
Rock Sound vol.39
- Released: August 2002
- Featured song: Eating Only Apples (Scared of the Police single version)

Free with Rock Sound magazine

Farnborough Groove Vol.9
- Released: 2001
- Featured song: Words From Reuben
Shelter Compilation
- Released: 19 December 2002
- Featured song: Banner Held High
Xtra Mile 1st Birthday Party CD
- Released: 7 April 2005
- Featured song: Blamethrower

Split CD with labelmates Million Dead given away at a one-off show in celebration of Xtra Mile Recordings' 1st Birthday

Xtra Mile Singles Club Split
- Released: 15 May 2006
- Featured song: Every Time a Teenager Listens to Drum & Bass a Rockstar Dies

Split single with Frank Turner

Print Is Dead Vol.1
- Released: 6 November 2006
- Featured song: Captain of Lies (w/Yourcodenameis:milo)

Yourcodenameis:milo compilation featuring collaborations with current British artists

Louder Than The Crowd CD2
- Released: 2004
- Featured Song: Banner Held High
Metal Music is Vital: Best of 2007
- Released: 16 December 2007
- Featured song: Deadly Lethal Ninja Assassin

compilation featuring other artists available on iTunes
