= We Should Have Gone to University =

We Should Have Gone To University

Compilation album by Reuben
- Released: 24 August 2009
- Genre: Alternative
- Label: Xtra Mile

Reuben chronology
In Nothing We Trust (2007)	We Should Have Gone To University (2009)

Professional ratings
Review scores
Source	Rating
Thrash Hits	5/6 stars

We Should Have Gone To University is the 2009 three-disc compilation album by the Alternative rock group Reuben. It collects b-sides, rarities and videos from the band over the course of their career.

== Release ==
The song "Scared of the Police" was the debut single released by Reuben. It was recorded in December 2001 at EMI studios in London with Idlewild/80's Matchbox producer Paul Tipler, and was the first recording to be released with Guy Davis on drums. The band's press company had suggested that they release a single, so they approached Andy Ross of Food records to release it as the first record on his new label, Bossmusic. It was released in March 2002 and reached #87 in the UK chart, impressive for a small release, and received good reviews from the music magazines, most notably a KKKKK rating from Andrew W.K in that week's issue of Kerrang! magazine. The accompanying video, the band's first to be played on TV, was a surprise success and reached #2 in MTV2's Most Wanted chart.

The second single, "Stux (Tell Me It's Alright)", was recorded in June 2002 with the band's friend Rob Fisher at Opus Studios in Grayshott, and was released in August later that year in the Bossmusic label. Despite bad press reviews the single reached #86 is the UK charts, the highest-charting single for the band at the time. The promotional video enjoyed success in the MTV2 chart, eventually climbing to #1 in December of that year following the band's tour supporting Hell Is for Heroes.

== Track listing ==
Disc 1
No.	Title	Previous Release	Length
1.	"Alpha Signal Seven"	Pilot EP
2.	"Words from Reuben"	Pilot EP
3.	"Crimson"	Pilot EP
4.	"Death of a Star"	Pilot EP
5.	"Shambles"	Pilot EP
6.	"Scared of the Police"	Scared of the Police
7.	"Eating Only Apples" (Single Version)	Scared of the Police
8.	"Wooden Boy"	Scared of the Police
9.	"Stux (Tell Me It's Alright)"	Stux (Tell Me It's Alright)
10.	"Stealing is Easy"	Stux (Tell Me It's Alright)
11.	"Banner Held High"	Stux (Tell Me It's Alright)
12.	"Lissom Slo"	Previously Unreleased
13.	"Let's Stop Hanging Out" (Single Version)	Let's Stop Hanging Out
14.	"Alpha Signal Five"	Let's Stop Hanging Out
15.	"Numb at Four in the Morning"	Let's Stop Hanging Out
16.	"Worn to Be Seen"	Previously Unreleased
17.	"Catch"	Previously Unreleased
18.	"Stuck in My Throat" (Single Version)	Stuck in My Throat
19.	"Doll Fin"	Stuck in My Throat
20.	"Scared of the Police" (Live for XFM)	Stuck in My Throat
21.	"Once"	Freddy Kreuger
22.	"Glitterskin"	Freddy Kreuger
23.	"Ways of Staying Pure"	Moving to Blackwater
24.	"Miffy in Auschwitz" (BBC Radio 1 Session)	Moving to Blackwater
25.	"Enemy"	Moving to Blackwater

Disc 2
No.	Title	Previous Release	Length
1.	"Scared of the Police" (Sheldon Version)	Previously Unreleased
2.	"Don't Die"	Previously Unreleased
3.	"Seated Near" (Floor cover)	A Kick in the Mouth
4.	"No Exit Wound"	A Kick in the Mouth
5.	"Victim"	Keep It to Yourself
6.	"Approaching by Stealth"	Keep It to Yourself
7.	"Karin" (Vex Red cover)	Keep It to Yourself
8.	"Feel Good Inc." (BBC Radio 1 Session) (Gorillaz cover)	Previously Unreleased
9.	"Two Kicks in the Mouth" (XFM Session)	Previously Unreleased
10.	"Blitzkrieg"	Previously Unreleased
11.	"Girls on Top" (Dreyfuss cover)	Blood, Bunny, Larkhall
12.	"What's Good for Me"	Blood, Bunny, Larkhall
13.	"Push"	Deadly Lethal Ninja Assassin
14.	"The Weight of the World"	Deadly Lethal Ninja Assassin
15.	"Christmas is Awesome"	Christmas is Awesome
16.	"Suffocation of the Soul" (BBC Radio 1 Session)	Previously Unreleased
17.	"Agony/Agatha" (BBC Radio 1 Session)	Previously Unreleased
18.	"The Hand That Feeds" (BBC Radio 1 Session) (Nine Inch Nails cover)	Previously Unreleased
19.	"Deadly Lethal Ninja Assassin" (Acoustic Version)	Previously Unreleased
20.	"Red Machine"	Previously Unreleased
21.	"Shambles" (Long Version)	TwoByThree EP
22.	"The Last Time"	Previously Unreleased

=== Disc Three (DVD content) ===
==== Music Videos ====
1. "Wooden Boy"
2. "Scared of the Police"
3. "Stux"
4. "Let's Stop Hanging Out"
5. "Stuck in My Throat"
6. "Freddy Kreuger"
7. "Moving To Blackwater"
8. "Blamethrower"
9. "A Kick in the Mouth"
10. "Keep It To Yourself"
11. "Blood Bunny Larkhall"
12. "Deadly Lethal Ninja Assassin"
13. "Cities on Fire"
14. "Christmas Is Awesome"
15. "Blitzkrieg"

==== Download '07 ====
Reuben's set on the main stage at Download Festival 2007.

==== In The Studio ====
The band record material, including Lissom Slo, at Jacob's Studio in Farnham.

==== Europe Tour ====
A video diary of their European tour with Billy Talent.

==== Reuben Talk To Designer Magazine ====
The band are interviewed whilst on tour.

== Miscellanea ==
Due to a double-tracking technique used to record "Catch", the guitars may cancel each other out when it is played on some stereos. If this occurs, the CD case suggests that the track should be called "Catch (Amazing special rare 'no guitars' mix)".

The final track, "The Last Time", was not meant to be about the band at the time of recording.

== Personnel ==
- Jamie Lenman – Guitars, vocals, piano
- Jon Pearce – Bass, vocals
- Guy Davis – Drums, vocals
