= Alan Rowe =

Alan or Allan Rowe may refer to:

- Alan Rowe (actor) (1926–2000), English actor, born in New Zealand
- Alan Rowe (archaeologist) (1891–1968), English archaeologist
- Alan Rowe, guitarist of the UK band Plutonik
- Allan Rowe (politician) (1956–2015), Canadian politician
- Allan Winter Rowe (1879–1934), American biochemist and physiological chemist

== See also ==
- Alan Rowe Kelly (born 1959), American actor and filmmaker
