= Devolver (album) =

Studio album by Jamie Lenman
- Released: 27 October 2017
- Studios: Sugar Cane Studios (Wandsworth, London); Brighton Electric (Brighton, East Sussex)
- Genres: Alternative rock, post-hardcore
- Length: 42:05
- Label: Big Scary Monsters
- Producer: Space

Jamie Lenman chronology
Muscle Memory (2013)	Devolver (2017)

Singles from Devolver
- 1. "Mississippi" Released: 23 January 2017; 2. "Waterloo Teeth" Released: 3 April 2017; 3. "Hell in a Fast Car" Released: 31 July 2017; 4. "Hardbeat" Released: 19 September 2017; 5. "Body Popping (automatic Edit)" Released: 22 January 2018

Devolver is the second studio album from ex-Reuben frontman Jamie Lenman. It was released on 27 October 2017 by Big Scary Monsters. The album has been described as the "most eclectic albums of his career to date" blending together a wide variety of musical styles and elements.

The album was announced alongside the release of the single Hell in a Fast Car as well as the announcement of the all-day festival curated and headlined by Lenman at The Dome, Tufnell Park called 'Lenmania.'

== Content ==
The album uses a heavier emphasis on electronic instrumentation than Lenman's previous releases. "I've been trying to put electronic blips, beeps and beats into my music ever since the second Reuben album. We were all very big fans of Nine Inch Nails and Soulwax, so we were keen to try and push those influences into our music at the time," Lenman said in an interview with The Independent Many noted Lenman's references to his previous material including the refrain to Mississippi which was previously used on the song 'Shotgun House' on his previous album Muscle Memory.

Many praised Lenman's blending of genres and described it as more concise and focused than it was on his previous record.

== Track listing ==
No.	Title	Length
1.	"Hardbeat"	5:01
2.	"Waterloo Teeth"	2:54
3.	"Personal"	3:54
4.	"Body Popping"	3:24
5.	"Comfort Animal"	1:33
6.	"Mississippi"	4:08
7.	"Hell in a Fast Car"	3:25
8.	"I Don't Know Anything"	5:10
9.	"Bones"	3:47
10.	"All of England is a City"	2:40
11.	"Devolver"	6:09

== Personnel ==
Credits adapted from the album's liner notes.

- Jamie Lenman – vocals, guitar, bass guitar
- Dan Kavanagh – drums, backing vocals
- Dominique Fraser – backing vocals (track 4)
- Kathryn Lenman – backing vocals (track 4)
- Evan Fromreide – recording engineer
- Vince Welch – recording engineer
- Barbara Bartikowski – strings
- Space – producer, keyboards, backing vocals
- Pete Maher – mastering engineer

Design

- Scott Chalmers – photography
- Black Futures – photography (snapshots)
