= Muscle Memory =

Studio album by Jamie Lenman
- Released: 11 November 2013
- Genre: Hardcore punk; thrash metal; crossover thrash; folk; big-band
- Length: 71:54
- Label: Xtra Mile Recordings
- Producer: Sean Genockey

Jamie Lenman chronology
Muscle Memory (2013)	Devolver (2017)

Professional ratings
Review scores
Source	Rating
MusicRadar	4/5 stars
Sputnikmusic	4/5 stars
Rock Sound	9/10 stars

Muscle Memory is the debut solo album by ex-Reuben front man Jamie Lenman. It was released on 11 November 2013 by Xtra Mile Recordings. The album is a double album featuring one disc of Thrash Metal and Hardcore Punk inspired songs and another disc of Folk, Jazz and Big-Band inspired songs. The album was praised for its diversity and praised Lenman's knack for "riffery and chord progressions."

== Track listing ==
Disc one
No.	Title	Length
1.	"The Six Fingered Hand"	3:27
2.	"Fizzy Blood"	1:41
3.	"No News is Good News"	5:16
4.	"One of My Eyes is a Clock"	3:52
5.	"Shower of Scorn"	2:52
6.	"A Terrible Feeling"	3:37
7.	"The Fuck of it All"	3:34
8.	"All the Things You Hate About Me, I Hate Them Too"	4:51
9.	"Gary, Indiana"	2:43
10.	"A Plague on Both Your Houses"	4:52
11.	"Muscle"	3:16
Total length:		40:01

Disc two
No.	Title	Length
1.	"Shotgun House"	3:38
2.	"I Ain't Your Boy"	3:59
3.	"It's Hard to be a Gentleman"	2:30
4.	"For God's Sake"	3:48
5.	"Little Lives"	2:56
6.	"If You Have to Ask You'll Never Know"	3:02
7.	"Pretty Please"	3:07
8.	"A Quiet Understanding"	2:23
9.	"Saturday Night"	1:15
10.	"A Day in the Life"	2:06
11.	"Memory"	3:09
Total length:		31:53

== Personnel ==
- Jamie Lenman – All other instruments and vocals except as listed below
- Dan Kavanagh – Drums, Maracas
- Basia Bartz – Violin, Cello on "If You Have To Ask You'll Never Know"
- Kathryn Lenman – Vocals on "If You Have To Ask You'll Never Know" and "It's Hard To Be a Gentleman"
- Jeremy Lenman – Vocals on "Little Lives"
- Sean Genockey – Guitar on "Shotgun House"
- The Jimmy Lemon Good Times Big Band
- The Aldershot Male Voice Choir
