= Freddy Krueger (disambiguation) =

Freddy Krueger is a horror film character from the A Nightmare on Elm Street series.

Freddy Krueger may also refer to:

- Freddy Krueger (water skier) (born 1975), world champion water skier
- "Freddy Kreuger" (song), a 2004 song by Reuben
- Friedrich-Wilhelm Krüger (1894–1945), Nazi official during the Third Reich
- Doug Gilbert, American professional wrestler who used the ring name Freddie Krueger

== See also ==
- Fred Kruger (1831–1888), German-born photographer
- Frederik H. Kreuger (1928–2015), Dutch high voltage scientist and inventor
