= Two-thirds =

Two-third or two-thirds may refer to:

- Two-thirds, a common supermajority for a proposal to gain a specified level of support
- Two-thirds rule (railway safety) of the British Railways
- Two-third profile or three-quarter view in portrait painting
- 2/3 (disambiguation), the mathematical fraction and expression
