= A Song to Ruin =

Studio album by Million Dead
- Released: 1 September 2003
- Recorded: Mighty Atom Studios, Swansea, Wales
- Genres: Punk rock, post-hardcore
- Length: 44:37
- Labels: Xtra Mile; Integrity
- Producers: Joe Gibb and Million Dead

Million Dead chronology
A Song to Ruin (2003)	Harmony No Harmony (2005)

Professional ratings
Review scores
Source	Rating
Rock Sound	10/10
Sputnikmusic	4/5

A Song to Ruin is Million Dead's debut full-length album. It was released in 2003 through Xtra Mile Recordings/Integrity Records.

== Critical reception ==
BBC Music called the album "essential listening for anyone with an ear for uncompromising, politicised rock sounds." musicOMH called it "heady punk rock, some of it fairly standard, much of it anything but; lyrics that could start a plethora of post-pub debates; and, all in all, a fine debut album."

== Track listing ==
All songs are written by Million Dead.

Standard edition
No.	Title	Length
1.	"Pornography for Cowards"	2:01
2.	"Breaking the Back"	3:12
3.	"I Am the Party"	2:56
4.	"Charlie + the Propaganda Myth Machine"	3:25
5.	"A Song to Ruin"	5:47
6.	"Smiling at Strangers on Trains"	2:55
7.	"Macgyver"	3:28
8.	"Relentless"	4:03
9.	"The Kids Are Going to Love It"	2:47
10.	"The Rise and Fall"	14:03
Total length:		44:37

Deluxe edition bonus tracks
No.	Title	Length
11.	"Gnostic Front"	3:55
12.	"I Gave My Eyes To Stevie Wonder"	3:08
13.	"Medicine"	4:10
14.	"Tonight, Matthew"	3:05
15.	"Asthma"	4:47
Total length:		1:03:42

Japanese edition bonus tracks
No.	Title	Length
11.	"Gnostic Front"	3:55
12.	"Reformulating The Challenge To Archism" (Recorded by Harvey Birrell.)	3:56
Total length:		52:28

== Personnel ==
- Frank Turner – Vocals
- Ben Dawson – Drums, Bass on 'Asthma'
- Cameron Dean – Guitar
- Julia Ruzicka – Bass
- Joe Gibb – Production, Mastering
- Alwyn Davies – Engineering
- Andrew Charnik – Engineering
- Kees Van Der Wiele – Photography
- Steven Fessey – Cover Design
