= Fizzy Blood =

British alternative rock band

- Origin: Leeds, England
- Genres: Alternative rock; grunge; psychedelic rock; pop-punk
- Years active: 2014–present
- Labels: Killing Moon; Alya Records; DMF Records
- Members: Benji Inkley; Paul Howells; Jake Greenway; Ciaran Scanlon; Tim Malkin
- Website: fizzyblood.officialstore.co.uk/Shop/

Fizzy Blood are a British alternative rock band from Leeds, England, formed in 2014. The group consists of Benji Inkley, Paul Howells, Jake Greenway, Ciaran Scanlon and Tim Malkin.

== History ==
Fizzy Blood have released two Extended plays: Feast (2015) via DMF Records and Summer Of Luv (2017) via Killing Moon/Alya Records.

The band has played at major music festivals such as Reading and Leeds Festivals, Download Festival, South by Southwest, as well as touring with bands such as Dead Kennedys, While She Sleeps and Dinosaur Pile-Up. Fizzy Blood supported Spring King in February 2018 in the United Kingdom.

In 2017, they were featured as band of the day in Metro. They have also been awarded new band of the week at Team Rock, and were a recipient of the Momentum Music Fund grant from PRS for Music.

On 13 January 2023, they released their debut album Pan Am Blues.

== Musical style and influences ==
Critics have categorised Fizzy Blood's music as alternative rock, grunge, psychedelic rock and pop-punk.

Fizzy Blood have cited influences including Pulled Apart by Horses, Dinosaur Pile-Up, Jamie Lenman, Reuben, Led Zeppelin, Frank Ocean and Kings of Leon.

== Discography ==
Studio albums

- Pan Am Blues (2023)

=== EPs ===
Title	Release details
Feast	Released: 22 June 2015; Label: DMF Records; Format: Physical/Digital download
Summer Of Luv	Released: 1 September 2017; Label: Killing Moon/Alya Records; Format: Physical/Digital download
Pink Magic	Released: 14 September 2018; Label: Killing Moon/Alya Records; Format: Physical/Digital download

== Members ==
- Benji Inkley - lead vocals, guitar
- Paul Howells - guitar, vocals, keys
- Tim Malkin - keys, guitar, vocals
- Ciaran Scanlon - bass guitar
- Jake Greenway - drums
