= Moving to Blackwater =

Single by Reuben

from the album Racecar is Racecar Backwards
- Released: 16 August 2004
- Genre: Rock, metal
- Label: Xtra Mile
- Songwriters: Jamie Lenman; Jon Pearce; Guy Davis

Reuben singles chronology
"Freddy Kreuger" (2004)	"Moving to Blackwater" (2004)	"Blamethrower" (2005)

"Moving to Blackwater" is the sixth single by Surrey-based rock band Reuben, and the third single taken from their debut album, Racecar Is Racecar Backwards. It was released in August 2004, and was also the first single that Reuben had ever released in the wake of an album. Opinion was divided as to whether or not it was the right choice to follow "Freddy Kreuger". It received only a small number of plays on radio at the time and even fewer showings on TV. In spite of this, the single still managed to reach #59 in the UK singles chart, only six places down from its predecessor. It was released on CD and 7" vinyl format, with a special alternative B-side on the vinyl copies.

== Track listings ==
=== CD ===
1. "Moving To Blackwater"
2. "Ways Of Staying Pure"
3. "Miffy in Auschwitz" (live at the BBC)

=== 7" Vinyl ===
1. "Moving To Blackwater"
2. "Enemy"

== Personnel ==
- Jamie Lenman – Guitars, vocals, piano
- Jon Pearce – Bass, vocals
- Guy Davis – Drums
- Jason Wilson (Stakeout Studios) – engineering, mixing and producing, track 1
- Steven Down – recording, mixing and producing, track 2
- Mitty (last name unknown) – engineering, track 3 at BBC Maida Vale Studios for Steve Lamacq's Radio One Evening Session
