= A Kick in the Mouth =

Single by Reuben

from the album Very Fast Very Dangerous
- Released: 3 June 2005
- Genre: Rock, metal
- Label: Xtra Mile
- Songwriter(s): Jamie Lenman; Jon Pearce; Guy Davis

Reuben singles chronology
| "Blamethrower" (2005) | "A Kick in the Mouth" (2005) | "Keep It to Yourself" (2005) |

"A Kick in the Mouth" is the eighth single by Surrey-based rock band Reuben, released in June 2005. It is the second single taken from their second album, Very Fast Very Dangerous (although the first, Blamethrower, was a download-only single). It was made available in both CD and vinyl format, with a different single b-side on each format. It was received well in the music press, even earning the band a thumbs up from The Sun Newspaper, who called it 'seriously loud', as well as a 9/10 rating from the July 2005 issue of Rock Sound Magazine. The song demonstrated the simpler approach to rock and roll that features on the second album, leaving out the many twists and turns and time-changes that featured in the first album. The single reached number #59 in the UK charts, and sold more copies in the first week of any of the band's singles at the time.

== Track listings ==
=== CD ===
1. "A Kick in the Mouth"
2. "No Exit Wound"

=== Vinyl ===
1. "A Kick in the Mouth"
2. "Seated Near"

== Personnel ==
- Jamie Lenman – Guitars, vocals, piano
- Jon Pearce – Bass, vocals
- Guy Davis – Drums

== Song information ==
=== A Kick in the Mouth ===
One of the newest songs on the album, and was originally nicknamed 'the Hawaiian song' because of its 1950s-style drum beat and guitar line. The song is tuned down to B (see guitar tuning), a tuning only previously heard on Racecar Is Racecar Backwards album track 'Wrong And Sorry,' to give what the band call "a deep, filthy sound to what is otherwise a good old fashioned, catchy rock and roll song". The solo drums at the beginning of the song were played by Chris Sheldon.

=== No Exit Wound (CD only) ===
An old song that featured on the band's first ever demo, 'Betrayed', back when they were called Angel. The song was re-record after fans kept requesting its appearance. Both this song and Seated Near were recorded at Jacob's studios in Farnham with Sam Bell, who they recorded the album demos with.

=== Seated Near (Vinyl only) ===
A cover of a song by Farnborough band Floor, who became Hundred Reasons. It was the first cover the band had ever recorded, and intended as the first in a series of covers by local bands who have long since disappeared in the hope of pointing fans towards their musical roots (see also liner notes of Very Fast Very Dangerous.

== The video ==
The videos for 'A Kick in the Mouth' and follow up single 'Keep It to Yourself' were filmed back to back in one weekend and were the most expensive videos recorded so far as they were both shot on film. The 'A Kick in the Mouth' video was shot in a studio in London with seven real dancers and Ryan Maunder, the engineer who worked on the album, and who appears in all the single sleeves as well as starring in the video for 'Keep It To Yourself'. Maunder also created a remix of the single.
