= Jamie Lenman =

English musician

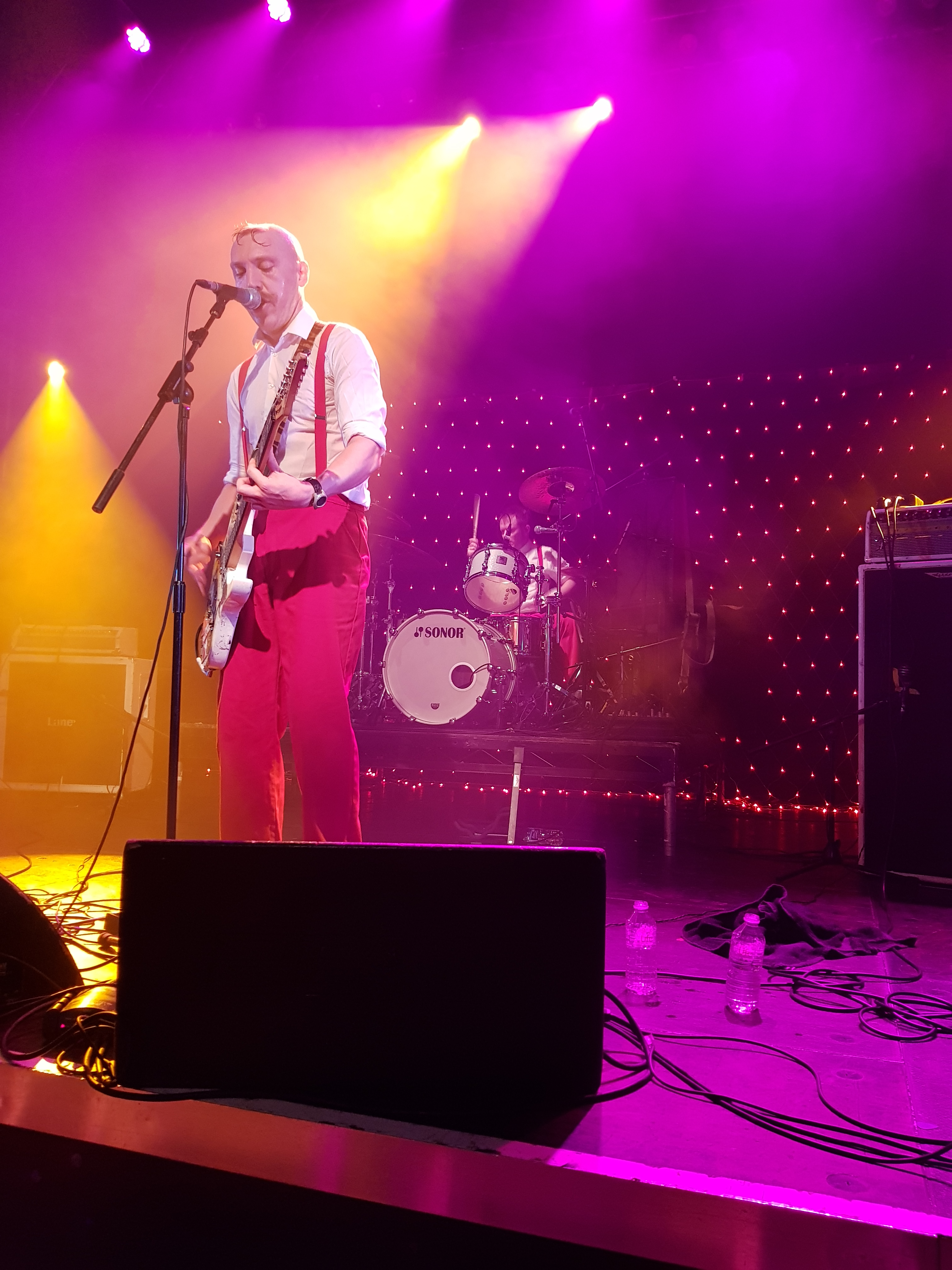
- Lenman playing live at Islington Academy for Lenmania 2019

Background information
- Born: Jamie Edward Lenman; 9 November 1982 (age 44)
- Origin: Camberley, Surrey, England
- Genres: Alternative rock; hardcore punk; folk; jazz; heavy metal
- Occupations: Musician; illustrator
- Instruments: Vocals; guitar; piano; bass; drums
- Years active: 1998–2008; 2013–2024
- Labels: Hideous Records; Xtra Mile; Big Scary Monsters
- Website: jamielenman.com

Jamie Edward Lenman (born 9 November 1982) is an English musician and illustrator. He is the lead singer, guitarist and main songwriter for British alternative rock trio Reuben from 2001 to 2008. Following the band's disbandment, Lenman shifted his focus to illustration. In 2008, he began his solo career, releasing and has since produced five studio albums.

As an illustrator, Lenman worked full-time for The Guardian from 2007 until 2014. He has also frequently contributed to the Doctor Who Magazine under the pseudonym "Baxter", releasing a collection of his work so far for the magazine called Whoah! in 2014.

== Early life ==
Lenman grew up in Camberley, Surrey, England with his mother and father. At a young age he began reading his uncle's collection of Peanuts, as well as reading Garfield comics which influenced him to start drawing. This was encouraged by his mother, who was also artistic, and by his father. His parents also encouraged him to learn a musical instrument, with Lenman learning piano, saxophone and eventually the guitar. The first rock album that he owned was Swagger by the band Gun, however the first album he owned was the Teenage Mutant Ninja Turtle soundtrack, at the age of eight. It was a "dodgy cassette tape copy of Queen's Greatest Hits from a market in Bulgaria" that led Lenman at the age of nine to aspire to be a cross between Queen vocalist Freddie Mercury and guitarist Brian May.

In 1996, after taking guitar lessons for some time, Lenman was introduced by his guitar teacher to Jon Pearce, who attended the same school as Lenman: Collingwood College, Surrey. Pearce had only been playing guitar for two weeks, however the pair, along with another student decided to form a band. Whilst at school Lenman studied both music and graphics. Lenman has reflected that he was a "good boy at school", and that he found it difficult to let go of extracurricular activities such as the Sixth Form Council and organising activity days when the band began taking up more of his time.

Lenman's jobs included working in a fish and chip restaurant, and at a music instrument & equipment shop. Lenman would continue to work these other jobs whilst in Reuben.

Pearce and Lenman were in various bands writing both their own material and playing covers of Nirvana and Green Day before eventually forming Angel with drummer Jason Wilson in 1998, which would eventually become the band Reuben. Angel were originally managed by Eve Houseman and Jim Bowes (1998–1999) who ran the live music promotion company Gigmania, which was prominent in establishing the then thriving music scene in the Camberley, Farnborough, and Reading areas.

== Musical career ==
=== 2001-2008: Reuben ===
After recording a number of demos with Pearce and drummer Mark Lawton the trio changed their name from Angel to Reuben, releasing an EP titled Pilot in January 2001, this was followed by a string of singles, which gained airplay on BBC Radio 1, MTV2 as well as press attention from Kerrang! magazine, Rock Sound amongst others. The band began gaining attention from larger record companies, and negotiated with a number of different labels both in the United Kingdom and United States, including Andy Ross at Food Records, who was keen for the band to sign to his label. The band ultimately decided to self-finance the recording of their debut album, it was only after its completion that they signed with Xtra Mile Recordings, who released their debut record Racecar is Racecar Backwards in June 2004.

In the long period spent getting their debut album out, Lenman already had songs lined up for the second album and in September 2005 the band released Very Fast Very Dangerous on Xtra Mile. To make being in a band more financially viable Lenman continued to work at a fish and chip restaurant as well as being in the band. In 2007, after parting ways with Xtra Mile Recordings, Lenman along with his bandmates set up their own label Hideous Records to release new Reuben new material, including their third album In Nothing We Trust.

"In the last year or so I had a bit of a confidence crash. I think just because we got a lot more popular very quickly – which isn't to say we suddenly reached Bon Jovi status, but lots more people tuned in – that meant the scrutiny was a lot higher and people would come to shows with such high expectations"

— Lenman

After releasing In Nothing We Trust in 2007 the band were becoming increasingly strained financially, with the groups savings running out, which Lenman found particularly difficult, "everyone that worked with us ended up doing things for mates rates or on a promise, it didn't feel very good to always be asking favours", Lenman felt as if he was not able to give enough back in order to compensate and pay people for helping him and the band. Trying to support the band and their lives, the band were continuing to work second jobs, with Lenman now full-time at The Guardian as an illustrator. Lenman was also finding the groups increase in fan following difficult to deal with, recalling that some fans would complain about the band failing to play their particular song preferences, "the longer you go they become bigger and bigger fans and I really felt the weight of people's expectations". Relationships between Lenman and his bandmates consequently had deteriorated, eventually to the point where the band were barely speaking, Lenman reflected on this in a 2009 interview "if I said something it would always be negative, which is terrible. I could feel myself creating an atmosphere a lot of the time". In June 2008, the band went on an indefinite hiatus, Lenman had "burnt out" and had no desire to make or perform music in any capacity.

Since the band's split, Reuben have released a compilation of b-sides, unreleased and rare studio and live material titled We Should Have Gone to University in 2009, and a tenth anniversary edition of their debut album Racecar is Racecar Backwards in 2014, featuring more previous unheard and unreleased demos and live sessions. Lenman has commented a number of times during press for his solo-album in 2013 on the possibility of Reuben reuniting in the future, stating he wants to give it more time before properly considering it, as "it's only been five years".

=== 2013-2016: Muscle Memory ===
After Reuben disbanded, Lenman concentrated on his work as an illustrator but would still receive letters and meet people who praised his work with Reuben, which encouraged him to get back into writing and performing. Lenman first hinted in 2010 that he would "probably finish the songs in my head" at some point and release them, although stated he did not know if and when that would be. Over the following years Lenman quietly worked away on new music, being in full-time employment at The Guardian – as well as working on other freelance projects Lenman worked "bit-by-bit" over around four-years with producer-friend Harry Goodchild. Early on in the process, Lenman assembled to practice his material with. Initially, Lenman found that he was writing and recording material that sounded like his previous band Reuben, and became interested in making a more pronounced leap in musical style.

On 23 September 2013 it was announced Lenman would be releasing his first record, Muscle Memory through Xtra Mile Recordings, as well as going on tour in the United Kingdom for the first time since Reuben split. The announcement also saw the release of his first double single "Fizzy Blood" & "Pretty Please". Both single tracks began receiving radio and videoplay on XFM, Kerrang! TV, Scuzz and Amazing Radio amongst others.

The 23 track album was released on 11 November 2013, with one half featuring "extreme, aggressive metal" and the other half "all folk and jazz". The release day was celebrated with an instore performance at Banquet Records. Lenman's first tour in 2013 saw him accompanied by a three-piece band, including Angus Cowan who worked both in the studio and on tour with Reuben, Dan Kavanagh on drums and Chris Coulter on guitar. Lenman's wife Lena also accompanied him on the tour, singing on the tracks "Little Lives" and "If You Have To Ask You'll Never Know", whilst an extended choir would join the band for the performance of "A Day In The Life".

"All along there were no plans, though. There were no plans past 'Pick up a guitar' and no plans past 'Finish these songs' and no plans past 'Let's record it.' So every step – it sounds like a cliche – but I'm just taking it as it comes."

— Lenman

Lenman's second double single featuring the tracks "It's Hard To Be A Gentleman" and "All The Things You Hate About Me, I Hate Them Too" premiered on 24 February 2014 on Rock Sound and featured reworked versions of both tracks. The tracks received airplay on BBC Radio 1, XFM, Scuzz, Kerrang amongst other media outlets. The single was released as a limited 7-inch vinyl for Record Store Day on 19 April. Lenman continued sporadically playing shows across 2014, including 2000 Trees Festival, Southampton's Takedown Festival, GuilFest in Guildford, Download Festival, ArcTanGent in Bristol as well as supporting Kerbdog at their London show on 16 November 2014. Some performances, including his own second headline tour included an extended seven-piece Heavy/Mellow band, featuring a horn section from Pete Fraser and Rob Piper. Lenman's final show of 2014 was a Christmas special at the West End Centre in Aldershot on 21 December, which included his Reuben bandmate Guy performing drums on their track "Moving to Blackwater".

Lenman has stated that he has no long-term plans in regard to releasing and performing music, and that it could be anywhere from a year to ten years time before he puts out another record, with illustration still being his primary focus. In a 2016 interview, Lenman once again discussed releasing new music and expressed his interest in working with a label and producer in the hope of being able to reach a broader audience.

=== 2017-2021: Devolver and Shuffle ===
On 11 January 2017 Kerrang! magazine announced that Lenman would be releasing a new single, titled "Mississippi". In a number of following interviews, Lenman revealed that he had been working for some time with his close personal friend, music producer Paul Frazer Space on new material. On 18 January 2017, "Mississippi" premiered on the BBC Radio 1 Rock Show, with Daniel P Carter making it his record of the week, before being made available to stream and purchase the following day, through Lenman's own record label, Mad Note. On 1 February 2017, Lenman's UK tour in support of his new material was announced for April and May 2017.

Speaking on releasing a second album, Lenman stated that he is constantly working with Space, and that "we're just going to release these tracks as they become available", although did follow this comment up by saying he is "still quite wedded to the concept of 10–12 tracks as a piece of work".

On 27 October 2017, Lenman released his second solo record Devolver through Big Scary Monsters, preceded by the release of single "Hell In A Fast Car", which premiered on 30 July 2017. On 11 November 2018, Lenman headlined his own 'Lenmania' festival, accompanied by acts including Employed To Serve, Palm Reader and Hannah Lou Clark.

On 8 June 2018, Lenman put out a double-a side single, featuring the tracks "Long Gone" and "Irrelevant", with Justine Jones of Employed to Serve featuring on the former and Arcane Roots' Andrew Groves on the latter.

On 15 September 2018, Lenman opened for Biffy Clyro in Dublin and the following day in Belfast on 16 September, as well as supporting Marmozets on 19 October in London.

A year after the release of Devolver, Lenman announced plans to put out a live album, Live at St. Pancras. The show was recorded at St Pancras Old Church on the day of Devolver's release and would feature the complete recording of the show, including the question and answer section.

Lenman announced he would release Shuffle on 5 July 2019. The album would be made up of covers, with Lenman influenced by the "technical deconstructions" from the likes of Biffy Clyro and Arcane Roots, Shuffle would see him cover songs by The Beatles, the theme song from Popeye, Bernard Herrmann's theme for the 1976 film Taxi Driver and more. Lenman laid out that it had long been a career goal of his to put out a covers record and that he had in fact wanted to originally do it after the release of Muscle Memory. Discussing his song and style choices for the record, Lenman described the piece as an attempt "to redefine the concept of a covers album – not just lazy sound-alikes of '80s classics, not just ironic metal versions of pop tunes".

On 9 April 2019, Dan Kavanagh announced that after ten years of working with Lenman, he would be stepping down as his drummer, but affirmed that he hoped the two would make music again one day. In June, Lenman performed in Belfast and Dublin, with his former Reuben bandmate Guy Davis on drums.

Lenman performed at various festivals across 2019, including Bad Pond Festival in April, Smithdown Road Festival Handmade Festival in May, Glastonbury Festival in June and Trebur Open Air Festival & Two Thousand Trees Festival in July.

=== 2020-2024: King of Clubs, The Atheist, retirement and Puke ===
On 25 September 2020, Lenman released an EP titled King of Clubs. The EP was released through Big Scary Monsters and preceded by the single "The Road To Right". Lenman subsequently toured the United Kingdom in December 2021, having delayed due to the COVID-19 Pandemic.

On 11 August 2022 Lenman released a new single, "Talk Hard". Singles "Lena Don't Leave Me" and "Hospital Tree" followed on 4 October 2022 and 17 November respectively, ahead of Lenman's fifth studio album The Atheist, which was released on 25 November 2022 through Big Scary Monsters. Lenman released a companion EP to The Atheist titled Iknowyouknowiknow on 5 May 2023.

On 21 February 2024, Lenman announced his "retirement" from the music industry, stating no further plans to tour or make any more records. Lenman revealed he was setting up a Patreon subscription service, where he would be sharing demos, performances and other content with subscribers. In April 2024, Lenman released an art book titled Skeletons & Skylines.

On 2 April 2026, Lenman released the single "Not Likely". With the release, Lenman stated that he "never intended to retire from music itself, just the machine that surrounds it". On 4 June, Lenman released another new single "You're Nothing", as well as announcing his new album Puke, which would be released on 7 August. Lenman described making the album "completely by accident" with the sessions being funded by his Patreon subscribers.

=== 2027-present: Reuben reunion ===
On 5 November 2026 it was revealed Reuben would reunite for 2027 to perform at 2000trees festival in Cheltenham. Reuben had previously cancelled their 2008 appearance at the festival following their break-up.

== Musical equipment ==
Since the age of 11, Lenman has used Yamaha RGX guitars, being awarded his first one after coming second in his age group at a songwriting competition. After damaging his original all-white RGX, he purchased a RGX121S with double hum buckers for £90, although he "couldn't afford it", thus had to convince his Reuben bandmates that it was a band-expense. Lenman has used the RGX121S across Reuben's career, on all of their albums and most of their tours as well as later using it to record and perform his first solo record, Muscle Memory. The guitar has been repeatedly broken, and is covered in tape to hold certain components in place as well as being covered in various stickers over the years including an Axe Cop logo – which covered over a Michael Jackson one, a Bossmusic logo, "BOOM" and "Voodoo" and "Monkey Hell".

Lenman has used a Fender Cyclone and Fender Stratocaster HH guitars for Reuben performances and recordings, going through a Laney Tube Fusion TF300 amplifier. Recording and performing Muscle Memory Lenman purchased a banjitar and also used a banjulele that belonged to his Great Uncle Arthur. Lenman also predominately uses Fender and Gretsch acoustic guitars live. Lenman has rarely used effects pedals, mainly relying simply on the overdrive setting on his amplifiers. Whilst performing in Reuben however, Lenman occasionally used an Akai HeadRush loop station.

Since Lenman began performing as a two-piece, he has further modified one of his Yamaha RGX's to include a passive pickup, which is linked to Electro-Harmonix POG which takes his guitar down an octave. This is then linked to separate guitar and bass heads, allowing Lenman to perform guitar and bass live.

== Illustration career ==
Lenman has maintained that illustration is his "first love", stating "I still sort of regard the stage I spent in a band as a sort of sidestep, like a holiday almost". Lenman's influences for his illustration include comics such as Peanuts, Garfield, Calvin and Hobbes, Jamie Hewlett's Tank Girl and Leighton Noyes' Doctor Who Magazine illustrations.

Before fully concentrating on Reuben, Lenman had taken graphics at A level, although it was through Reuben he began learning programs such as Photoshop to create flyers and other artwork for the band, as they could not afford to pay someone else for them. Lenman designed, created and co-created various pieces of artwork for the band, and eventually through Reuben he met and was ultimately commissioned by the then editor of Rock Sound magazine, Darren Taylor to create some illustrations for the magazine, including 'Rockbot'. In 2007, whilst recording and subsequently touring In Nothing We Trust, Lenman began working full-time as an illustrator for The Guardian, creating content for education websites, it was through this that Lenman further developed his skills as an illustrator, learning to draw with vector programmes like Adobe Flash and Illustrator.

Lenman has also contributed to the Doctor Who Magazine since around 2007 under the pseudonym 'Baxter'. A long time Doctor Who fan, Lenman owns a full size custom made Dalek which he can be seen purchasing in the Reuben documentary What Happens in Aldershot Stays in Aldershot. Lenman initially believed that the magazine weren't interested in his work, and didn't realise he'd been published until he saw one of his illustrations in the magazine "I nagged Doctor Who Magazine for a year before they published my cartoon, without really telling me. I thought they still wanted me to bugger off, and there it was in the shops!" On 9 November 2014 Miwk Publishing Ltd released Whoah! – From the Pages of Doctor Who Magazine which contains all of Lenman's Doctor Who comics from the past eight years.

Other illustration work from Lenman includes "Megabot" for The Spill Magazine, content for the Wellcome Trust's In The Zone website, Directgov Kids, EDF Energy's The Pod website, the artwork for Providence an album by Caretaker and various children's books published by A & C Black including "Hard Nuts of History" series by Tracey Turner, "A Dinner Of Smells" by Humaira Rashid and "Big Shot" by Sean Callery.

== Personal life ==
Lenman is teetotal. His wife Lena Lenman is a burlesque dancer, who performed vocals on Lenman's first solo album, as well as accompanying him on tour to sing her parts, she has also appeared in Lenman's music videos for "All the Things You Hate About Me, I Hate Them Too", "It's Hard to be a Gentleman", and "Like Me Better".

== Back-up band ==
Note: Since the release of Devolver Lenman has mostly just performed as a two-piece, solely as guitar/vocals and drums.

The Atheist lineup (2022–2023)

- Jack Wrench – drums, vocals (2019–2023)
- Jen Hingley – guitar, vocals (2022–2023)

Shuffle lineup (2019–2020)

- Guy Davis – drums (2019–present, occasional guest)
- Chris Rouse – drums (2019–present)
- Jack Wrench – drums (2019–present)

Devolver lineup (2017–2019)

- Dan Kavanagh – drums, vocals

The Heavy/Mellow Band (2013–2016)

Note: Supporting Muscle Memory, Lenman consistently toured with the core Heavy/Mellow Band, whilst occasionally expanding it with additional musicians for different shows.

- Chris Coulter – guitar, vocals
- Angus Cowan – bass guitar, vocals
- Dan Kavanagh – drums, vocals

Occasional expanded Heavy/Mellow Band

- Lena Lenman – vocals
- Rob Piper – saxophone
- Pete Fraser – saxophone
- Harry Goodchild – guitar, vocals (2014)

== Discography ==
Solo studio albums

- Muscle Memory (2013)
- Devolver (2017)
- Shuffle (2019)
- King of Clubs (2020)
- The Atheist (2022)
- Puke (2026)

Solo studio EPs

- Iknowyouknowiknow – (2023)

Solo live albums

- Live at St Pancras – (2018)

Solo singles

Year	Title	Chart	Label	Album
2013	"Fizzy Blood"	—	Xtra Mile Recordings	Muscle Memory
2013	"Pretty Please"	—	Xtra Mile Recordings	Muscle Memory
2014	"It's Hard to be a Gentleman"	—	Xtra Mile Recordings	Muscle Memory
2014	"All These Things You Hate About Me, I Hate Them Too"	—	Xtra Mile Recordings	Muscle Memory
2017	"Mississippi"	—	Mad Note Records	Devolver
2017	"Waterloo Teeth"	—	Big Scary Monsters	Devolver
2017	"Hell in a Fast Car"		Big Scary Monsters	Devolver
2018	"Long Gone"/"Irrelevant"	—	Big Scary Monsters	
2019	"Popeye"	—	Big Scary Monsters	Shuffle
2019	"Killer" (Adamski & Seal cover)	—	Big Scary Monsters	Shuffle

With Reuben

- Racecar Is Racecar Backwards – (2004)
- Very Fast Very Dangerous – (2005)
- In Nothing We Trust – (2007)

Guest appearances

Year	Title	Artist	Album
2006	"Save Yourself"	Left Side Brain	Action Potential
2006	"Captain of Lies"	Yourcodenameis:milo	Print Is Dead Vol 1
2007	"Ladies of London Town"	Frank Turner	Sleep Is for the Week
2009	"Are You Convinced?"	Sucioperro	Pain Agency
2012	"A Little Bit of Rapping"	The Black Dog Allstars	
2013	"Black Mamba"	ZIMT	Tube Killers
2014	"Again?"	King Canute	Cutting Teeth – EP
2014	"Clocks"	To Catch a Thief	Monsters
2015	"The Slaying Of Skeggi"	Down I Go	You're Lucky God, That I Cannot Reach You
2015	"Good Grief"	The Travis Waltons	Separation Season
2016	"To Take the First Turn"	Black Peaks	Statues
2019	"Omens"	The St Pierre Snake Invasion	Caprice Enchanté
2019	"First Words"	Haggard Cat	Common Sense Holiday
2021	"The Open Road"	The Hell |Joris (A Hardcore Opera), Pt. 2	

Covers

Year	Title	Original Artist	Album
2010	"Mexican Wave"	Kerbdog	Pledge: A Tribute to Kerbdog
2015	"Good Riddance (Time of Your Life)"	Green Day	Kerrang! Magazine: Ultimate Rock Heroes
