= 2/3 =

2/3 may refer to:

- A fraction with decimal value 0.6666...
- A way to write the expression "2 ÷ 3" ("two divided by three")
- 2nd Battalion, 3rd Marines of the United States Marine Corps
- February 3
- March 2
- Two By Three, 2008 EP by Reuben, The Ghost of a Thousand and Baddies

== See also ==
- Two-thirds (disambiguation)
