= Integrity Records =

British record label

- Distributor: SRD
- Genre: Rock
- Country of origin: England
- Location: Bedford, England
- Official website: integrityrecords.co.uk

Integrity Records is an English independent record label based in Bedford, England. The label was founded in the early 1990s and specialises in discovering new bands in the rock/indie/punk genres.

== History ==
The first release on the label was 1996 single 'Ghost Island' by The Traceys, but the label is most notable for signing bands such as Miss Black America and Million Dead, whose vocalist Frank Turner went on to forge a successful solo career.

John Peel was a great supporter of the label and played the vast majority of their releases on his BBC Radio 1 show. In 2002, 5 Integrity releases (including B-sides) appeared in Peel's annual Festive Fifty.

Over the years, Integrity has also been the UK home for American artists such as Katastrophy Wife and Meow Meow.

In December 2005 Integrity released a single by London-based noiseniks October All Over, after which the label entered a hiatus.

In March 2011, the label announced via social media feeds that it was active again and welcomed two new signings. A redesigned official website then confirmed those signings as Travis + Julie from Nashville, Tennessee and Birmingham dream-indie duo Pet Dog Storm. Travis + Julie's single Osmosis preceded their album Moon Girl whilst Pet Dog Storm released debut single Time to Fly from their album Beautiful is Down.

In June 2012 the label announced the signing of Scottish art-rockers Miniature Dinosaurs, followed by a single "Lemonade" in July and the "Turn It On EP" in November. Their roster grew further with the addition of Birmingham alt pop band TheLights with the single "Days Don't Get Me Far Enough Away".

November 2012 saw a deal announced with Futur Primitif, the new project of Daniel Lefkowitz, former member of American indie-folk band The Low Anthem, followed by the release of two singles, Nuclear Shockwave and Digital Space, and the album Machineteeth.

In 2013 the label signed Valentiine, an all-girl trio from Melbourne, Australia, and released singles Love Like and Chucky, before their debut album Valentiine in July 2013, said by Time Out London to be "one of the best grunge records since the death of Kurt Cobain".

Later in the year, the label signed both Horse Party and Wolverhampton based indie-electronica outfit Silhouettes, with the latter releasing their debut single "Gold Tag" in November 2013, and debut album "Ever Moving Happiness Machines" in January 2014. Horse Party, from Bury St Edmunds, released singles What Do You Need and Clarion Call alongside album Cover Your Eyes, and were chosen by BBC Introducing to play the 2014 Latitude Festival.

Integrity Records was named Best Independent Record Label 2014 in the Love Music Magazine annual awards.

In 2015 Integrity Publishing Ltd, a sister company to Integrity Records but focussed on music publishing, was born.

During 2016 two new bands join the Integrity label roster. Manchester's Ghosts of Social Networks' debut single Love Potion was heard several times on BBC 6 Music and Amazing Radio, and followed by several singles through 2016 and 2017. Mannequin Death Squad, from Melbourne, released debut single Sick and 5-track mini-album Eat Hate Regurgitate alongside UK tours in September 2016 and September 2017.

2018 saw the label look to the Nordics for musical inspiration with album and single releases by Danish dream-folk artist MALMØ (We Come From The Stars) and Greenlandic singer-songwriter Simon Lynge (Deep Snow), along with an award of Label of the Year 2018 in the LWM Music Blog awards.

2019's key releases included an album by Copenhagen based folk/Americana artist Ida Wenøe (The Things We Don't Know Yet) and singles by UK collaborators Tribes of Europe & Barbara Stretch.

== Releases ==
- Antihero - Stravinsky Gave Me Nightmares - CD single, 17 February 2003
- Miss Black America - God Bless Miss Black America - CD album, 16 September 2002
- Miss Black America - Miss Black America (edit) - CD and 7" single, 16 September 2002
- Antihero - Rolling Stones T-Shirt - CD single, 24 June 2002
- Miss Black America - Talk Hard - CD and 7" single, 27 May 2002
- Miss Black America - Infinite Chinese Box - CD and 7" single, 4 March 2002
- Plutonik - Prime Numbers - CD and vinyl album, 19 July 1999
- Plutonik - Londinium - CD and 12" single, 25 June 1999
- Plutonik - Sitting on Top of the World - CD and 12" single, 6 April 1999
- The Joylanders - Yesterday's Happenings - 7" single
- The Traceys - Ghost Island - CD and 7" single, 27 September 1996
- Million Dead - Smiling at Strangers on Trains - CD single, 3 February 2003
- Katastrophy Wife - Liberty Belle - CD and 7" single, 9 June 2003
- Million Dead - Breaking the Back - CD and 7" single, 11 August 2003
- Million Dead - A Song To Ruin - CD album, 1 September 2003
- Reuben - Stuck In My Throat - CD and 7" single, 10 November 2003
- Million Dead - I Am The Party - CD and 7" single, 24 November 2003
- Katastrophy Wife - Blue Valient / Emit Time - CD single, 10 May 2004
- Meow Meow - Cracked - CD single 7 June 2004
- Katastrophy Wife - All Kneel - CD album, 14 June 2004
- Meow Meow - Sick Fixation - CD single, 20 September 2004
- Meow Meow - Snow Gas Bones - CD album, 11 October 2004
- October All Over - 2005BC - CD single, 25 November 2005
- Travis + Julie - Osmosis - download single, 17 October 2011
- Pet Dog Storm - Time to Fly - download single, 24 October 2011
- Pet Dog Storm - Beautiful Is Down - CD and download album, 7 November 2011
- Miniature Dinosaurs - Lemonade - download single, 13 August 2012
- Miniature Dinosaurs - Turn It On EP - CD EP, 5 November 2012
- Futur Primitif - Nuclear Shockwave - download single, 21 January 2013
- Futur Primitif - Machineteeth - CD and download album, 8 April 2013
- Valentiine - Love Like - download single, 8 April 2013
- Futur Primitif - Digital Space - download single, 6 May 2013
- Valentiine - Chucky - download single, 24 June 2013
- Valentiine - Valentiine - CD and download album, 1 July 2013
- Futur Primitif - Time - download single, 23 August 2013
- TheLights - Dust & Stone - download single, 28 October 2013
- Horse Party - What Do You Need - download single, 11 November 2013
- Silhouettes - Gold Tag - download single, 25 November 2013
- Valentiine - Animal - download single, 6 January 2014
- Horse Party - Cover Your Eyes - CD and download album, 17 April 2014
- Horse Party - Clarion Call - download single, 17 April 2014
- Silhouettes - Prufrock's Dream - download single, 19 May 2014
- Silhouettes - Ever Moving Happiness Machines - CD and download album, 2 June 2014
- Silhouettes - Sacrifice - download single, 10 November 2014
- Valentiine - Beauty Lies - download single, 15 December 2014
- Ghosts of Social Networks - Love Potion/Mockingbirds - download single,6 May 2016
- Mannequin Death Squad - Sick - download single, 10 June 2016
- Mannequin Death Squad - Eat Hate Regurgitate - CD and download mini-album, 9 September 2016
- Ghosts of Social Networks - Comeback Kid - download single, 21 October 2016
- Ghosts of Social Networks - No Going Back - download single, 10 February 2017
- Ghosts of Social Networks - Outside The Wheel - download single, 12 May 2017
- Mannequin Death Squad - Van Gogh - download single, 23 June 2017
- Ghosts of Social Networks - If This Isn't Love - download single, 21 July 2017
- MALMØ - You - download single, 20 October 2017
- MALMØ - We Come From The Stars - download single, 2 March 2018
- MALMØ - We Come From The Stars - CD and download album, 4 May 2018
- Simon Lynge - Age of Distraction - download single, 7 September 2018
- MALMØ - The Way (feat. Eivør) - download single, 28 September 2018
- Simon Lynge - Paper Thin, download single, 9 November 2018
- Simon Lynge - Deep Snow - CD, vinyl and download album, 23 November 2018
- MALMØ - Frostbite - download single, 1 February 2019
- Mannequin Death Squad - Blue - download single, 14 February 2019
- Ida Wenøe – Another Kind of Love - download single, 1 March 2019
- Ida Wenøe - The Things We Don’t Know Yet - CD, vinyl & download album, 12 April 2019
- Tribes of Europe & Barbara Stretch - You Don't Speak For Me - CD & download single, 21 June 2019
- Ida Wenøe - Change Me A Little - download single, 13 September 2019
- MALMØ - Bleed Me Dry - download single, 25 October 2019
- Tribes of Europe & Barbara Stretch - It’s A Lovely Day Tomorrow - CD & download single, 6 December 2019
- Ida Wenøe - Värmeland - download single, 31 January 2020
