= The Holiday Plan =

English rock band

The Holiday Plan are an English rock band from Hackney and Islington, London that split up in May 2005, but reformed in June 2006 (performing under a host of different names). Consisting of a bassist/vocalist Matt Rider, as well as two guitarists (Gary Jenkins and Blue Quinn) and drummer (Daniel Bodie), The Holiday Plan play melodic punk rock with dual-guitar parts, and could be classed as gruff punk. The band were featured on MTV's documentary on upcoming bands, Breaking Point, where MTV followed The Holiday Plan, as well as other bands, around as they went around touring, among other rock band duties.

The band toured with Billy Talent, Thrice, Reuben, My Awesome Compilation, Jackson, Matchbook Romance and played numerous shows with Biffy Clyro.

Matt Rider and Daniel Bodie now play in Matt Trakker along with bass player Eoin Keeley of the ska/dub/punk band Bogus Gasman. Matt Trakker won the 2008 Road to V competition and got to perform live at the V Festival in 2008, as well as returning to play V festival in 2009. Matt Trakker are due to release their debut single in early 2010.

Daniel Bodie moved to New Zealand in October 2010, with Max Taylor taking over on drums. Mat Elias (Name your Heroes/Brinkworth/Piper saint) joined as drummer in April 2012.

== Discography ==
- The Holiday Plan (EP) – (2003)
- Wasting Time/The Green Lights EP – (2004)
- "Wasting Time" (Single) – (2004)
- "Stories" / "Sunshine" (Double A-Side Single) – (2004) #58 UK Charts
- Let's Degenerate EP – (2012)
