= Greg McDonald =

British singer-songwriter

Greg McDonald is a British singer-songwriter who announced the forthcoming release of his debut solo album in 2008. He was the frontman of The Dawn Parade, a Bury St Edmunds based British indie band. He is the main man in contemporary folk band Glymjack.

McDonald's songs have won awards from Rolling Stone and The International Songwriting Competition, and he has been championed by DJs Tom Robinson, Mark Radcliffe, Steve Lamacq and John Peel, for whom he recorded two Peel Sessions.

== Biography ==
Greg McDonald grew up in a Suffolk village close to Bury St Edmunds, where he and school friend Nick Morley formed The Dawn Parade. Also featuring Barney Wade (bass) and Ben Jennings (drums), The Dawn Parade signed to Cambridge-based indie label Repeat Records, toured extensively, and recorded two Peel Session. In 2003 a new line-up of McDonald on guitar and vocals, Jeremy Jones (lead guitar), Mark Sewell (drums, vocals), and Steve McLoughlin (bass) recorded debut album The Dawn Parade, released on Repeat Records. In August 2006 the band split, McDonald saying, "I wouldn't have missed it for the world and I didn't."

In late 2007, McDonald's first solo outings marked a darker tone and new acoustic direction as he returned to playing live as a solo performer and with singers Catherine McDonald and Emily Jukes and musicians Jeremy Jones, Sam Inglis and Seymour Patrick.

In January 2008, McDonald announced the forthcoming release of his debut solo album, Stranger At The Door.

2018 saw the release of Glymjack's debut album Light the Evening Fire, featuring Phil Beer, Steve Knightley, Gemma Gayner, Dickon Collinson, Miranda Sykes, Evan Carson and Tom Peters.

In 2019 through to 2021, McDonald’s Glymjack recruited accomplished percussionist Jesse Benns, Keyboardist Art Toper and Radio 2 Folk Awards nominee Saul Bailey for several large festival shows, including Cambridge Folk Festival, New Forest Folk Festival and Lakefest.

== Discography ==
=== Singles / EPs ===
With The Dawn Parade

- "The Dawn Parade EP" (2001)
- "Good Luck Olivia" (2001)
- "Electric Fence Your Gentleness EP" (2002)
- "Caffeine Row" (January 2003)
- "Strung Out On Nowhere" (August 2003)
- "The Underground" (November 2004)

As Greg McDonald

- "Reclaim The Night" (June 2009)
- "A Little Strange" (November 2009)
- "Liberty Waltz" (November 2010)

=== Albums ===
With The Dawn Parade

- The Dawn Parade (2006)

With Glymjack

- Light the Evening Fire

As Greg McDonald

- Stranger At The Door (January 2008)
- Tomorrow England (March 2011)

== Sources ==
- Greg McDonald on Myspace
- Band page at Repeat Records website
