= Caretaker (band) =

English rock band

- Origin: Hampshire, England
- Genres: Hardcore, Post-Rock, Progressive, Math Rock
- Years active: 1998 – Present
- Label: We Be Records Trials of Early Man
- Members: Harry Goodchild, Seb Carey, Sam Mitchell
- Past members: Chris Grigg (1998-2003), John Hibbird (1998-2007), Jamie Lenman (2004-2007)
- Website: www.caretakerband.com

Caretaker is an English three piece rock band based in Winchester, Hampshire, England. Their music combines elements from many different corners of rock music, including hardcore, post-rock, progressive and math rock and the band strongly aspire to the DIY ethic. Caretaker are well known for their influence and longevity in the UK underground music scene, and their infrequent and informal approach towards releasing records and touring. The band have stuck to the DIY ethic despite airplay from BBC Radio 1 and Xfm, and critical acclaim from NME, Kerrang!, Rock Sound and Terroriser. During their career, the band have played with well-known acts such as Biffy Clyro, Reuben, Death Cab for Cutie, Oceansize, Les Savy Fav and Hell is for Heroes, as well as having played a headlining show at the Camden Palace (now known as Koko).

== History ==
=== Early years ===
Formed at Alton College in 1998, Caretaker quickly became a regular fixture in the Hampshire/Surrey music scene and by the end of 1999 had recording their first EP, (Pause), named after the stage direction so frequently found in the Harold Pinter play The Caretaker, from which the band had taken their name. The EP was released on Badmusic, a label that had been set up for this specific purpose by two friends of the band. Much to the band's surprise, tracks from (Pause) received several plays on BBC Radio 1 by Mary Anne Hobbs, Steve Lamacq and John Peel despite having been recorded in guitarist Harry Goodchild's living room on a budget of £80. In 2000, Caretaker recorded a follow up EP, Routine, which was also released by Badmusic.

Also in 2000, Caretaker were approached by well-known London independent record label, Fierce Panda to record a track for a compilation entitled Cutting Hedge. Despite being poorly received by NME, Caretaker's contribution to the compilation was subject to a positive review in Kerrang! which led to Fierce Panda asking the band to record a mini-album. The self-titled mini-album Caretaker was recorded in 2001 at Southern Studios and received positive reviews from NME, Kerrang! and Rock Sound, and led to the band performing a live set on XFM's Xposure Live show with John Kennedy.

=== The Sign of Four and line-up changes ===
In 2003, Caretaker recorded an EP called The Sign of Four, which showed a more aggressive sound than on previous recordings. Shortly afterward, drummer Chris Grigg left the band to pursue further education, leaving Caretaker on hiatus and the EP unreleased. After several months of uncertainty, Reuben front-man Jamie Lenman volunteered to drum for the band and The Sign of Four finally saw release through Function Records in 2005. Also during this time, the band were featured on the soundtrack to the Xbox game Project Gotham Racing 2. Having toured the UK with Reuben, Caretaker began writing their first full-length album.

Due to Lenman's commitments to Reuben, and Caretaker's increasingly complicated song structures, song writing was a slow process for the band, who continued to gig sporadically throughout the UK. In 2008 Lenman announced that he would leave the band (which coincided with his decision to put Reuben on hiatus) and shortly after, John Hibbird also decided that he would leave the band to travel the world.

=== Three piece ===
After a six-month hiatus, remaining members of the band Harry Goodchild and Seb Carey started looking for a new drummer. They quickly settled on Sam Mitchell (Carey's cousin), and by September 2008 had started playing gigs again as a three piece.

In July 2009 the band recorded the single "Rook/Impasse" as a taster for the coming album. The songs were recorded by Wayne Pennell, who the band had worked with previously on Sign of Four and was released by the band with no record label involvement. The release was given single of the month in October's edition of Rock Sound magazine.

=== Providence ===
In 2010 the band took to the studio again to record their second album, entitled Providence, but due to the band's desire to make the album to the high standard they wanted, and various personal commitments (including Goodchild's and Carey's respective weddings) production on the album was not finished until the latter months of 2011. In the meantime, the band recorded two tracks for a split EP with Oxford Sludgecore band Undersmile, which was released through Blindsight Records in September. Providence was made available to fans for a limited time through the band's website throughout December 2011, and was released on 12 March 2012 through We Be Records. The promotional track "Hellion" taken from the album was played by Daniel P. Carter on the BBC Radio 1 Rock Show on 16 January 2012.

== Discography ==
=== Extended plays ===
| Title | EP details |
|---|---|
| Routine | · Released: 2000 · Label: Badmusic · Formats: CD Track list: 1. Routine; 2. You'll Never Learn; 3. Northfacing |
| (Pause) | · Released: 2000 · Label: Badmusic · Formats: CD Track list: 1. Rangefinding; 2. We Watch & Wait; 3. Safe as Houses; 4. Liopleuradon |
| Sign of Four | · Released: 2005 · Label: Function Records · Formats: CD Track list: 1. Learning Curve; 2. Vicious Circle; 3. Ennui; 4. Coda |
| Rook/Impasse | · Released: 2009 · Self-release · Formats: CD-R Track list: 1. Rook; 2. Impasse |
| Undertaker | · Released: 2011 · Label: Blindsight Records · Formats: CD Track list: 1. Yeehah!; 2. The Inexorable March |

=== Albums ===
| Title | Album details |
|---|---|
| Caretaker | · Released: 2001 · Label: Fierce Panda · Formats: CD Track list: 1. Entrance; 2. Routine; 3. Backs Against The Fall; 4. Hidden Agenda; 5. Red Mist; 6. Safe As Houses; 7. Raze |
| Providence | · Released: 2012 · Label: We-Be Records · Formats: CD Track list: 1. Thousand Yard Stare; 2. Martinet; 3. Hellion; 4. Impasse; 5. Providence; 6. Rook; 7. What We Have We Hold; 8. The Outpost; 9. Pariah; 10. The Upper Air |
