= TheLights =

English pop band

TheLights are an English pop band from Birmingham, UK. The five-piece consists of Shaun Kelly (vocals and guitar), Liz Sheils (vocals, keyboard), Dan Tombs (guitar and vocals), Gary Worton (Bass), Warren Meadows (Drums).

"Teenager of the Century", the band's début album, was released in October 2011 and recorded over the course of ten days by producer Gavin Monaghan (Editors, Ocean Colour Scene, Robert Plant, Paolo Nutini and Scott Mathews). The début received many positive reviews ("a shimmering piece of indie pop" said Indie London and Gigs and Festivals calling them "one of the brightest new bands to arrive on the UK music scene" ) and saw theLights play extensively throughout 2011-2012, including a performance at the inaugural Strummer of Love festival, Cockrock 2012 and the BBC club. In September 2012 the band played the Birmingham Symphony Hall as part of the Birmingham Artsfest festival.

With the release of Teenager of the Century, the band have garnered radio support from the likes of Radio 2, BBC 6 Music, BBC WM, BBC Tees, BBC Cambridge, Amazing Radio, BFBS and Q Radio

The band signed to Integrity records in October 2012 for the release of their single 'Days don't get me far enough away' supported by a video starring BBC Radio 2 DJ's Jeremy Vine, Alex Lester, Janice Long plus BBC 6 Music DJ Chris Hawkins.
