= Pet Dog Storm =

British band

Pet Dog Storm is a band from Warwickshire in the UK, signed in 2010 to Integrity Records. The band's debut single "Time to Fly" was played by Tom Robinson on BBC Radio 6 Music, and John Kennedy on XFM. It features on the band's debut album Beautiful is Down, which was released on 4 December 2011.

Pet Dog Storm comprise Ibiza DJ Mark Lane and vocalist Tina M who have appeared as Aware on a number of chillout compilations including those of the Cafe del Mar and Hed Kandi. label.
