= Harmony No Harmony =

Album by Million Dead

Studio album by Million Dead
- Released: 16 May 2005
- Recorded: Battery Studios in November and December 2004
- Genres: Post hardcore, hardcore punk, punk rock, alternative rock
- Length: 55:19
- Label: Xtra Mile Recordings
- Producer: Mark Williams

Million Dead chronology
A Song to Ruin (2003)	Harmony No Harmony (2005)

Professional ratings
Review scores
Source	Rating
AllMusic	(not rated)
Europunk	4/5 stars

Harmony No Harmony is the second and final full-length album released by British band Million Dead. It is the first to feature new guitarist Tom Fowler who replaced original guitarist Cameron Dean. Lead singer Frank Turner's mother makes an appearance on the song "To Whom It May Concern". Members of the band Drive Like You Stole It appear on both "To Whom It May Concern" and "Father My Father". In a podcast released in May 2015, Turner revealed that there would be a vinyl re-release of the record in 2015 to celebrate its 10th anniversary.

== Track listing ==
All tracks are written by Million Dead.

Standard edition
No.	Title	Length
1.	"Bread and Circuses"	2:33
2.	"Holloway Prison Blues"	4:15
3.	"After the Rush Hour"	3:29
4.	"Plan B"	1:37
5.	"Carthago Est Delenda"	6:00
6.	"To Whom It May Concern"	4:17
7.	"Living the Dream"	5:10
8.	"Margot Kidder"	6:37
9.	"Murder and Create"	3:13
10.	"Achilles Lung"	4:08
11.	"Bovine Spungiform Economics"	1:59
12.	"Father My Father"	3:33
13.	"Engine Driver"	6:13
14.	"Harmony No Harmony"	2:15
Total length:		55:26

Japanese edition bonus tracks
No.	Title	Length
15.	"Sasquatch"	3:40
16.	"Tonight Matthew"	3:02
Total length:		1:02:08

== Personnel ==
- Frank Turner – Vocals, Acoustic guitar
- Ben Dawson – Drums, Tam-tam, Backing vocals
- Tom Fowler – Electric guitar, Acoustic guitar, Backing vocals
- Julia Ruzicka – Bass, Backing vocals
- Mark Williams – Production, Mixing
- Barney Herbert – Production assistant
- Eric Broyhill – Mastering
- Richard Fowler – Drawings
- Layouts and photography by Million Dead
- Additional vocals on "To Whom It May Concern" – Jane Turner, Ashley Bird, Simon Young, Mel Young, Bethia Beadman, Alice Young
- Additional vocals on "Father My Father" – Evan Cotter, Simon Fowler, Ashley Bird, Simon Young, Mel Young, Alice Young, Mike Kruger, Tony Arthy, Lars Minkinnen

== Miscellanea ==
- The title "Bread and Circuses" is a reference to a Roman belief that all that was needed to keep the masses distracted from serious matters that affected them was "bread and circuses" (food and entertainment). This is mirrored in the song's lyrics.
- "Holloway Prison Blues" is a play on the title of the Johnny Cash song "Folsom Prison Blues", as singer Frank Turner lived in Holloway at the time of writing. The lyrics also mention Francis Fukuyama, the American philosopher, political economist and author.
- "After The Rush Hour" is a nod to the Neil Young song "After The Gold Rush". It also gives lyrical nods to Austrian politician Klemens Wenzel von Metternich, British philosopher Jeremy Bentham's idea of a panopticon and Italian politician Giuseppe Mazzini and the Jimmy Webb (most notably covered by Glen Campbell) song "Wichita Lineman".
- "Carthago Est Delenda" is a reference to the Third Punic War. The phrase is Latin, and was spoken at the end of every speech Roman senator Cato the Elder made during the Punic wars. The phrase loosely translates as "Carthage must be destroyed". The song also gives short mentions to the disaster of Mount Vesuvius and the constant threat of disaster from the San Andreas Fault.
- Margot Kidder is an actress famed for her parts in the Superman movies, and also for a highly publicised mental breakdown in 1996 (suiting the somewhat weary nature of the song's lyrics).
- "Murder and Create" is a reference to a line in T. S. Eliot's 1917 poem, The Love Song of J. Alfred Prufrock. This is one in a long line of T. S. Eliot references which can be found in the band's (and later Frank Turner's) material. Another example is the first lyric of "Carthago Est Delenda" – "To Carthage then I came", which is a line from The Waste Land.
- 'Father My Father' gives a lyrical mention to the students of the Sorbonne (a name used to refer to the University of Paris or one of its offshoots).
- The album title Harmony No Harmony is taken from the liner notes to Black Flag's album Everything Went Black.
