= Simon Lynge =

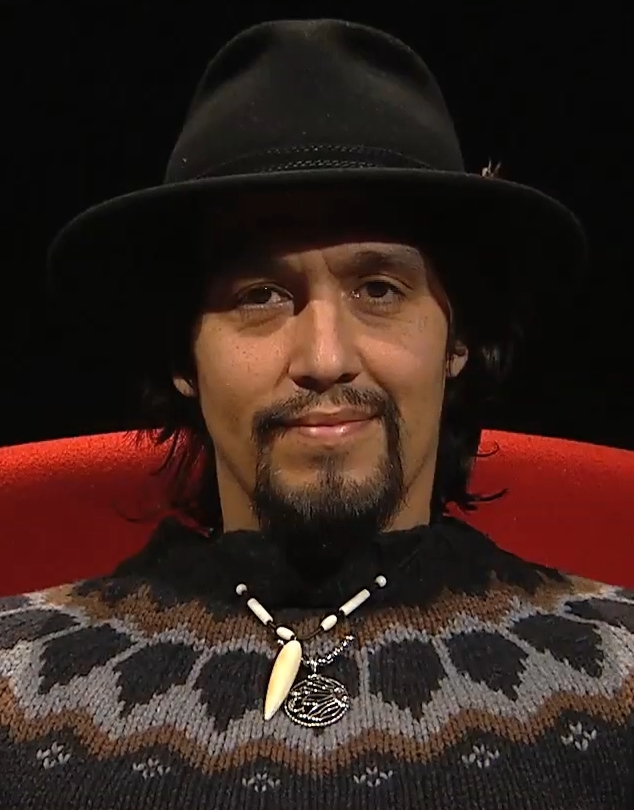
- Lynge in 2019

Background information
- Born: 22 January 1980 (age 45)
- Origin: Holstebro, Denmark
- Genres: pop music
- Instruments: Vocals, guitar, piano
- Years active: 2007–present
- Labels: Lo-Max Records, Songcrafter Music, Integrity Records
- Website: Simon Lynge Music

Simon Lynge (born 22 January 1980) is a singer-songwriter who was raised in Greenland and Denmark.

Lynge is the first solo musical artist from Greenland to have an album released across the United Kingdom, and the first Greenlander to play the UK's Glastonbury Festival. Lynge has performed extensively across Europe and the United States, and he accompanied Emmylou Harris as support act on the American singer's 2011 tour of Europe.

Lynge's 2010 debut album, The Future reached the top of the Amazon UK Rock Charts in the week of its release. Lynge's music has variously been compared by writers to that of Paul Simon, James Taylor, The Beach Boys and The Beatles. Since 2008, Lynge has lived in Jefferson County, Washington.

== Biography ==
Simon Overgaard Lynge was born in Holstebro, Denmark, but grew up in Qaqortoq, Greenland. His father was a theatrical performer and an accordionist who played with the Greenlandic musician Rasmus Lyberth. Lynge has said that he had no formal schooling as a child, but worked as a shepherd and hunter, living in a village of fewer than 40 residents that was an hour's boat ride from the nearest town.

As a teenager, Lynge worked as a delivery boy for a supermarket in Qaqortoq. Shortly afterwards he moved back to Denmark, where he enrolled in the Holstebro Music School to study opera, piano, drums and music theory. While in Denmark, he became part of the young Copenhagen music scene, performing his own compositions as a singer and guitarist at a range of venues. Around this time he also travelled to London, Nashville and Los Angeles to perform and write his own music.

=== The Future ===
In 2008, Lynge played a concert in the Hollywood music venue Highland Grounds and impressed the producer Matt Forger (engineer on Michael Jackson's Thriller album), who suggested recording his songs. Shortly afterwards, Lynge began the intensive series of recording sessions at Bright Orange Studios in Los Angeles that resulted in his debut album, The Future. The co-producers were Forger and Jon Mattox.

Released on the independent London-based label Lo-Max Records in 2010, the album caused a wave of media interest, leading to appearances on BBC television and Sky News in the UK, an appearance on Swedish television, and press features in Europe. The album was nominated in the Independent Music Awards of 2010. It has been released in Sweden, Norway, Denmark, Germany, Austria, Switzerland, Ireland and New Zealand, in addition to the UK.

Lynge usually performs live with the multi-instrumentalist Richard Lobb, with whom he wrote the song London Town on his debut album. As well as his band Simon Lynge & The Martial Hearts. Lynge's larger concerts have also seen him accompanied by a full string section.

=== International exposure ===
Lynge spent much of 2010 touring across Europe, in addition to accepting a request to perform at the Sundance Film Festival in Utah. In July 2010 he headlined the music festival in Tivoli Gardens, Copenhagen, playing to an audience of more than 25,000.

His song "The Future" was featured in a 2009 advertisement for the world's most northerly four-star hotel, Hotel Arctic in Ilulissat, Greenland. The advertisement won the Gold award at the 2010 Golden City Gate competition in Berlin. Lynge's songs have also featured on US television shows including Lie to Me and Brothers & Sisters and the film American Pie Presents: Beta House.

=== Deep Snow ===
In February 2018, Lynge and long-time musical collaborator Richard Lobb isolated themselves in a house in Trallong, Wales, to record the album Deep Snow, later completed in Narcissus Studios in London. He later announced his signing to Integrity Records and, following two singles Age of Distraction and Paper Thin, the album Deep Snow was released on 23 November 2018.

== Discography ==
=== Albums ===
- 2010: The Future
- 2014: The Absence of Fear
- 2016: The Map of Your Life
- 2018: Deep Snow

=== Singles ===
- 2011: "London Town"
- 2011: "If You Go"
- 2011: "Infinitely You"
- 2013: "The Absence of Fear"
- 2016: "The Map of Your Life"
- 2016: "Hallelujah"
- 2016: "Drum Beat"
- 2018: "Age of Distraction"
- 2018: "Paper Thin"
