= Stuck in My Throat =

Single by Reuben

from the album Racecar Is Racecar Backwards
- Released: 10 November 2003
- Genre: Rock, metal
- Label: Integrity Records, Xtra Mile
- Songwriter(s): Jamie Lenman; Jon Pearce; Guy Davis

Reuben singles chronology
"Let's Stop Hanging Out" (2003)	"Stuck in My Throat" (2003)	"Freddy Kreuger" (2004)

"Stuck in My Throat" is the fourth single by English rock band Reuben, and the first to be taken from the album Racecar Is Racecar Backwards. It was recorded at Stakeout Studios in Chobham where the band recorded the album with producer Jason Wilson. It was released in October 2003 on the Integrity Records and Xtra Mile labels (cat. no. INT 023), home to Million Dead, on CD and 7" vinyl, a first for the band. It received positive reviews and reached #77 in the UK chart. Zane Lowe made it his Radio 1 single of the week, but XFM said that it was 'too heavy' to play.

== Track listings ==
=== CD and 7" ===
1. "Stuck in My Throat"
2. "Doll Fin"
3. "Scared of the Police" (Live for XFM)

== Personnel ==
- Jamie Lenman – Guitars, vocals, piano
- Jon Pearce – Bass, vocals
- Guy Davis – Drums

== Charts ==
Chart (2003)	Peak position
UK Indie (OCC)	13
UK Rock & Metal (OCC)	12
UK Singles (OCC)	77
