= God Bless Miss Black America =

Studio album by Miss Black America
- Released: September 16, 2002
- Recorded: The Magic Garden, Wolverhampton; September 2001 - January 2002
- Genre: Rock, indie
- Length: 44:12
- Label: Integrity Records
- Producer: Gavin Monaghan

Miss Black America chronology
| God Bless Miss Black America (2002) | Terminal (2005) |

Singles from God Bless Miss Black America
- 1. "Don't Speak My Mind" Released: 2001; 2. "Infinite Chinese Box" Released: March 4, 2002; 3. "Talk Hard" Released: May 27, 2002; 4. "Miss Black America" Released: September 16, 2002

God Bless Miss Black America is a studio album released on September 16, 2002 by alternative rock band Miss Black America on Integrity Records. It was Miss Black America's debut album.

== Track listing ==
| # | Title | Length |
|---|---|---|
| 1 | Human Punk | 2:40 |
| 2 | Strobe | 2:50 |
| 3 | Car Crash For A Soul | 3:19 |
| 4 | Infinite Chinese Box | 3:12 |
| 5 | Roadkill | 3:56 |
| 6 | Personal Politics | 4:13 |
| 7 | Talk Hard | 3:36 |
| 8 | Scream For Me | 3:04 |
| 9 | Don't Speak My Mind | 4:29 |
| 10 | Miss Black America | 4:43 |
| 11 | Montana | 8:10 |

== Production ==
The album was recorded between September 2001 and January 2002 at The Magic Garden in Wolverhampton. All lyrics were written by Seymour Glass (with the exception of "Scream For Me", which also features vocals from Mike Smith) and all music was written by Miss Black America. It was produced by Gavin Monaghan. It was engineered by Andy Taylor. It was mastered by Ian Shepherd at SRT. Photography for the artwork was produced by Julia Kidd and Daisy Metz.

== Personnel ==
- Seymour Glass - vocals, additional guitars
- Mickey Smith - bass, extra vocals on Scream For Me
- Neil D. Baldwin - drums
- Gish - guitar

== Singles ==
Five tracks from the album were released as single, they were;

- Don't Speak My Mind
- Infinite Chinese Box
- Talk Hard
- Miss Black America
- Human Punk (included on the "Adrenaline Junkie Class-A Mentalist" E.P.)

All five were included in two of John Peel's Festive Fiftys. "Don't Speak My Mind" and "Human Punk" were included in the 2001 list, placed at number 42 and number 14 respectively, while "Infinite Chinese Box", "Miss Black America" and "Talk Hard" were placed at 45, 11 and 3 respectively in the 2002 list.

== Reception ==
Professional ratings
Review scores
| Source | Rating |
|---|---|
| Drowned in Sound (8/10); The Guardian | 3/5 stars |

The album has been described as a "fast 'n' hard sonic pummelling", and that "much of God Bless sounds like the more mature Manic Street Preachers playing U2's Boy".
