= Miniature Dinosaurs =

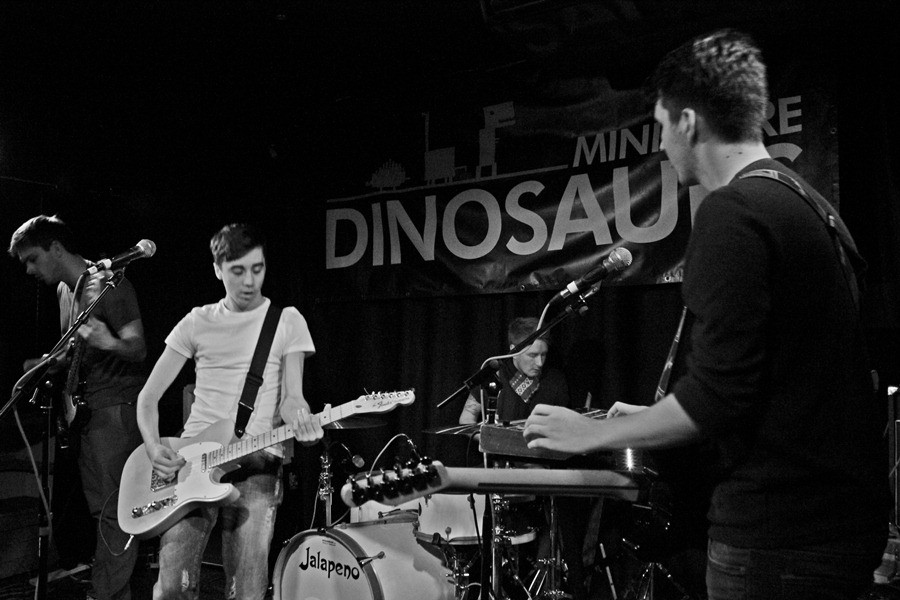
- Miniature Dinosaurs c. 2014

Background information
- Origin: Stirling, Scotland
- Genre: Pop/ Rock
- Years active: 2009–2014
- Label: Integrity Records Electric Honey Records
- Members: Barry Maclean; Alban Dickson; Andrew McAllister; Sam Waller
- Website: www.miniaturedinosaurs.co.uk

Miniature Dinosaurs were a pop/rock band from Stirling, Scotland. The band consisted of Barry Maclean (Vocals/Guitar), Alban Dickson (Bass Guitar), Andrew McAllister (Guitar/Synth), and Sam Waller (Drums). Critics compared their music to The Killers, Pulp, and Weezer.

== History ==
In March 2009, their track '(I Want To Watch) Top Gear' was featured on BBC Radio 1, meaning the band made it to national airwaves three months before the outfit performed its first gig.

In 2010, the band announced a clothing endorsement with Police-883, the fashion company's first endorsement of its kind. The band appeared several times in the MTV drama Being Victor in the same.

Their 2011 single "Fight or Flight" was picked up by Electric Honey (label), which released it as a 7" Vinyl. Electric Honey is most famous for helping out Biffy Clyro, Snow Patrol, and Belle & Sebastian in their early years.

In 2012, the band was nominated for Best Live Act at the Scottish Alternative Music Awards and then signed to UK independent label Integrity Records.

Between 2012 and 2014, the band worked on their debut album at Beetroot Studios in Airdrie. In 2014, without explanation, the band broke up and their album, In The Spirit of Everything, was posthumously released as a digital download.

== Releases ==
=== Albums ===
| Name | Format | Release date |
|---|---|---|
| In The Spirit of Everything | digital download | August 2014 |

=== EPs ===
| Name | Format | Release date |
|---|---|---|
| Turn It On | CD / digital download | November 2012 |
| Off The Radio | CD / digital download | February 2011 |
| Chatterbox | CD / digital download | February 2010 |
