= The Dawn Parade =

The Dawn Parade were a British rock band from Bury St Edmunds formed in 2000. Greg McDonald was the main songwriter, and also provided vocals and guitar.

The band performed 200 gigs in the UK and received critical acclaim from Rolling Stone and John Peel, for the latter of whom the band performed a number of live sessions.

== Biography ==
In 1998 friends from Thurston Community College, Greg McDonald, Nick Morley, Tom Weller and Ben Jennings formed a band, The Hip Down. The band played a small festival as their debut performance and later recorded a ten track demo at Meadowside Studios in Wisbech. Shortly into 1999 Weller departed to University, leaving the band without a permanent bassist. In late 1999, singer-songwriter Seymour Glass briefly joined on bass before leaving to front another local band, Miss Black America.

Auditioning many bass players and managing to win a local band competition covering "Bohemian Rhapsody", they formed a new incarnation of the band in 2001, with Rob Brown (guitar) and Dave Jago (bass) under the new name The Dawn Parade. The band's name came from McDonald's term for his walk back to his village on a Monday morning as the sun came up, having spent the money needed for a taxi home in bars the previous night. The new band played several shows and recorded a self-funded, self-titled debut EP, which the band distributed themselves. Shortly before the release of the EP, Jago left to concentrate on his own project, grindcore band Becky Jago, and was replaced by the longstanding permanent bassist Barney Wade.

Several months later the band made an appearance on an early form of internet television station 'MP3TV' which led them to finally releasing their first official single, "Good Luck Olivia", under the station's show host Susan Hyatt's Not Your Common Records. Then came their second, "Hole in my Heart", in 2002 via the Cambridge based independent record label, Repeat Records, leading the band to tour extensively around the UK for six weeks. Soon after this the band recorded its first Peel Session. The second took place in March 2003, live with a studio audience at BBC Maida Vale (MV4). The band further gigged extensively across the country until July 2003, when Morley, Jennings and Wade decided to leave and focus on their own musical projects, such as the Brighton-based 'Enid Blitz'.

The band re-formed with a new line-up of McDonald on guitar and vocals, Jeremy Jones (lead guitar), Neil Rayson (bass guitar), Mark Sewell (drums, vocals) and Claire Pruden (backing vocals). Rayson was soon replaced by Steve McLoughlin. The first single of this lineup was "The Fortune Line". The band changed its name to The Visions in late 2005, shortly after finishing recording their debut album in Wales with producer Chris Brown. By August 2006 the band split and finally released their debut album in November 2006 on Repeat Records under their original name The Dawn Parade.

Following the Dawn Parade's split, McDonald continued as a solo artist; he has, to date, recorded two full-length solo albums, partly in collaboration with former Hip Down/Dawn Parade members Jeremy Jones, Nick Morley and Seymour Glass (credited as Seymour Patrick) and continues to play live throughout the UK.

== Discography ==
=== Singles / EPs ===
- "The Dawn Parade EP" (2001)
- "Good Luck Olivia" (2001)
- "Electric Fence Your Gentleness EP" (2002)
- "Caffeine Row" (January 2003)
- "Strung Out on Nowhere" (August 2003)
- "The Underground" (November 2004)

=== Albums ===
- The Dawn Parade (2006)

== Sources ==
- Band page at Repeat Records website
