= Miss Black America (band) =

- Origin: Bury St Edmunds, England
- Genres: Punk rock
- Years active: 1999–2006
- Past members: Seymour Glass; Mat Anthony; Mike Smith; Neil Baldwin; Gish; Ryan Banwell; Simon Chapple; Simon Cooper; Laura Kidd; Richard Phillips; Dan Smart; Jonny Steele

Miss Black America (MBA) were a punk rock band formed in Bury St Edmunds, Suffolk, England in 1999 and active until 2006.

Following early patronage from BBC Radio One DJ John Peel, the band received press attention as part of NME magazine's short-lived 'No Name' scene. They released two albums: God Bless Miss Black America (2002) and Terminal (2005), and recorded four Peel Sessions before splitting in 2006.

The band's line-up changed frequently, with lead singer/guitarist Seymour Glass the only constant member.

== List of former members ==
- Seymour Glass – vocals & guitar (1999–2006)
- Mat Anthony – guitar & vocals (2002–2006)
- Mike Smith – bass & vocals (1999–2002, 2005)
- Neil Baldwin – drums (1999–2002)
- Gish – guitar (2000–2002)
- Ryan Banwell – bass (2003–2005)
- Simon Chapple – drums (2004–2005)
- Simon Cooper – drums (2003–2004)
- Laura Kidd – bass (2006)
- Richard Phillips – guitar (2005)
- Dan Smart – drums (2006)
- Jonny Steele – bass (2003)

== Post-Miss Black America ==
Baldwin, Smith and Gish played together as My Hi-Fi Sister from 2003 to 2006.

Glass, Baldwin and Smith played together as Ten City Nation from 2007 to 2012. They released three albums.

Seymour Glass released a solo album, Import/Export, under the moniker 'Open Mouth' in 2007. He has contributed guitars to the second album by former The Dawn Parade frontman Greg McDonald; bass guitar for country band The Blazing Zoos, alongside journalist Andrew Mueller and members of Jesus Jones; and guitar and piano for singer-songwriter Lewis Mokler . He currently plays guitar with three-piece indie-rock band Horse Party and in artist/musician Kate Jackson's touring band The Wrong Moves.

Gish has continued to record and release as a solo artist and producer, latterly under the moniker Hypermagic.

Mat Anthony has since been involved in drum & bass project Baron Greenback, fronted hard rock outfit Alita's Curse, and played lead guitar with singer songwriter Elena and hard rock solo artist Curran.

Laura Kidd is a music producer, solo artist and YouTuber working under the name Penfriend. She previously worked as a session musician (playing bass for Tricky, Alex Parks, Lil' Chris and Duncan James), filmmaker and photographer and released four-and-a-bit solo albums under the name She Makes War between 2010 and 2019. Performing solo on electric guitar, ukulele and loop pedal she has toured supporting Chris T-T, Juliana Hatfield, Midge Ure and Viv Albertine as well as performing with Viv Albertine and Carina Round.

Richard Phillips and Neil Baldwin played together briefly in The Khe Sanh Approach in 2005, before forming three-piece rock band The Vitamins in 2011.

Simon Chapple and Gish currently play together in Bury St Edmunds-based hip hop collective Scare The Normals.

Simon Cooper and Gish currently play together in Bury St Edmunds-based metal outfit Men of Munga.

== Releases ==
=== Singles ===
- "Miss Black America EP" (2000, CD only) (Self-release)
- "Adrenaline Junkie Class-A Mentalist EP" (2001, CD only) (R*E*P*E*A*T Records)
- "Don't Speak My Mind" (2001, 7" only) (Dental Records)
- "Infinite Chinese Box" (2001, CD/7") (Integrity Records)
- "Talk Hard" (2002, CD/7") (Integrity Records)
- "Miss Black America" (2002, CD/7") (Integrity Records)
- "Drowning By Numbers" (2003, 7" only) (R*E*P*E*A*T Records)
- "Beautiful Velocity" / "All I Want Is Out" (2003, 7" only) (R*E*P*E*A*T Records)
- "Dot Dot Dot" (2005, CD only) (R*E*P*E*A*T Records)
- "Drowning By Numbers" (2005, CD only) (Ruby Slippers Records)
- "Emotional Junkmail" (2006, 2-part CD only) (Ruby Slippers Records)

=== Albums ===
- God Bless Miss Black America (2002, CD/vinyl) (Integrity Records (UK), Syft Records (Japan))
- Terminal (2005, CD only) (R*E*P*E*A*T Records)
- Terminal (2005, CD only) (Re-Issue, Ruby Slippers Records)
