= Plutonik =

Musical group from Birmingham, England

Plutonik, formed in 1999 in Birmingham, England, is a drum and bass music group consisting of Chrissy Van Dyke (vocals), Alan Rowe (percussion) and James D (keyboards).

Having signed to Integrity Records, Plutonik released two singles, "Sitting on Top of the World" and "Londinium", both of which received airplay on national radio from DJs such as Steve Lamacq on BBC Radio 1, and their debut album Prime Numbers, which was described by The Observer as "intermittently successful" with the vocals of Van Dyke being "real quality".

The band toured extensively in the UK and mainland Europe with an expanded five-piece lineup, and were one of the first drum-and-bass acts to utilise a live drummer.

Over 10 years after its release, Prime Numbers was reissued by Integrity Records in the autumn of 2012 and made available for digital download for the first time.

== Discography ==
- Prime Numbers (1999)
