= Two-thirds rule (railway safety) =

British railway safety rule

The two-thirds rule is a railway safety rule originating from the Southern Region of British Railways. The two-third rule requires that the speed of a freight train is limited to no more than two-thirds of the speed limit for a passenger electric multiple unit (EMU).

For safety reasons, speed limits are imposed on trains running on a railway line. Many factors can affect the speed limit of a particular line including the state of the track, the curvature of the track, the number of stations, the individual features of stations or junctions and the stopping distances of trains running on that track. During the existence of the BR Southern Region, EMUs used on these lines were generally capable of slowing down much more quickly than the freight trains that shared these tracks. The Southern Region introduced the "two-thirds rule" as a safety and performance measure in response to this discrepancy.

On the modern British railway network, this rule was included in the Railway Group Standards (RGS) GK/RT0034 and then persisted in to the GK/RT0075 Requirements for Minimum Signalling Braking and Deceleration Distances. A study concluded in 2014 proposed that a strategy be introduced to replace the two-thirds rule due to increased performance of modern freight locomotives, however the rule persists on many parts of the railway in southern England.

== See also ==
- Bexley derailment
