= Baddies (band) =

British indie rock band

- Origin: Southend-on-sea, Essex, England
- Genres: Indie rock Post-punk revival Alternative rock
- Years active: 2007–2012
- Label: Medical
- Members: Michael Webster; Jim Webster; Simon Bellamy; Danny Rowton
- Past members: Ben Gardener
- Website: www.listentobaddies.co.uk

Baddies were a British high energy indie rock band formed in late 2007 and played through 2012. BBC Introducing included them on their BBC Introducing stage at One Big Weekend as tipped by BBC Essex Introducing. They are set to support other BBC Introducing acts such as Marina & the Diamonds, Temper Trap, Little Commets & Master Shortie. In May 2009 BBC Essex Introducing further backed the act in the form of a live session and Glastonbury Festival announced that they would be playing on the John Peel stage.

The debut album Do The Job was released on 28 September 2009 on Medical Records. It was recorded at Rockfield Studios by Sean Genockey, with additional work taking place at Black Dog Studios. The album was supported by touring of the UK and Europe, including 32 European festivals in the summer of 2009. The band then embarked on tours of Australia and Japan in 2010.

Baddies launched a campaign through PledgeMusic in May 2011 in order to raise funds for recording their second studio album. The album was recorded in the summer of 2011, again at Rockfield Studios. The album was produced by Sean Genockey. The band announced in October 2011 that the new album would be titled Build, which was released in March 2012.

The band announced their split through their Facebook page on 19 July 2012.

== Members ==
- Michael Webster – Vocals/Guitar
- Jim Webster – Drums/Vocals/Electronics(Build)
- Simon Bellamy – Guitar/Vocals/Electronics(Build)
- Danny Rowton – Bass/Vocals

== Discography ==
- TwoByThree Split EP with Reuben and The Ghost of a Thousand (2008)
- Do the Job (2009)
- Build (2012)
