= Freddy Kreuger (song) =

Single by Reuben

from the album Racecar Is Racecar Backwards
- Released: 7 June 2004
- Genre: Hard rock
- Label: Xtra Mile
- Songwriter(s): Jamie Lenman; Jon Pearce; Guy Davis

Reuben singles chronology
"Stuck in my Throat" (2003)	"Freddy Kreuger" (2004)	"Moving to Blackwater" (2004)

"Freddy Kreuger" [sic] is the fifth single by Surrey-based rock band Reuben, and the second single taken from their debut album Racecar Is Racecar Backwards. The song's title refers to Freddy Krueger, the horror protagonist from Wes Craven's slasher film A Nightmare on Elm Street, but is misspelled. It was released in June 2004, and was the first release on XtraMile/Sony, whom the band had at last signed a proper record deal with. The single was released on CD and 7" vinyl format, and reached #53 in the UK charts. It also made the #1 spot on the Chain With No Name independent chart, and Zane Lowe made it his Radio 1 single of the week. It was Reuben's first track to be playlisted on XFM and their first track to be played on Mary Anne Hobbs’ Rock Show. It was also played on Virgin Radio sporadically.

== Track listing ==
1. "Freddy Kreuger"
2. "Once"
3. "Glitterskin"

== Personnel ==
- Jamie Lenman – Guitars, vocals
- Jon Pearce: Bass guitar
- Guy Davis – Drums

== Charts ==
Chart (2004)	Peak position
UK Indie (OCC)	6
UK Rock & Metal (OCC)	6
UK Singles (OCC)	53
