= Two By Three =

TwoByThree EP

EP by Reuben, The Ghost of a Thousand, Baddies
- Released: 25 March 2008
- Genre: Rock, Metal
- Length: 18.19
- Label: Hideous Records

Reuben, The Ghost of a Thousand, Baddies chronology
In Nothing We Trust (2007)	TwoByThree EP (2008)

The TwoByThree EP was the first EP release under the Hideous Records label, and also the first from the label to feature other bands. The EP is a three-way split between Reuben, The Ghost of a Thousand and Baddies (ex-member of Engerica, Michael Webster's new project). The EP was limited to 500 in stores and 1000 at Reuben shows.

== Track listing ==
No.	Title	Artist	Length
1.	"Cities on Fire (Single Edit)"	Reuben	2:40
2.	"Shambles (Extended Version)"	Reuben	5:20
3.	"Black Art Number One"	The Ghost of a Thousand	2:47
4.	"Up To You (Original Mix)"	The Ghost of a Thousand	2:50
5.	"Battleships"	Baddies	2:15
6.	"Tiffany I'm Sorry"	Baddies	2:29

== Trivia ==
- The cover artwork is by Hannah Buck.
