= Million Dead =

English post-hardcore band

- Origin: London, England
- Genres: Post-hardcore, punk rock, hardcore punk, alternative rock, emocore
- Years active: 2000–2005, 2025
- Label: Integrity / Xtra Mile
- Members: Frank Turner; Julia Ruzicka; Ben Dawson; Cameron Dean; Tom Fowler

Million Dead were an English post-hardcore band from London, originally active between 2000 and 2005, before reuniting in 2025 for a one-off festival appearance at 2000 Trees and a headline tour concluding at the Electric Ballroom in London on December 14th 2025.

== History ==
The band was founded in 2000 by Cameron Dean and Julia Ruzicka, after both came to London from Australia. They were joined by Ben Dawson, who had worked with Dean in a record shop in the city. The band's lineup was completed with the addition of vocalist Frank Turner, an old bandmate of Dawson's. The name was chosen from a lyric in the song "The Apollo Programme Was a Hoax", by Swedish hardcore punk band Refused. The first Million Dead demo was recorded in September 2001.

The band's touring career began with support sets for Cave In, The Eighties Matchbox B-Line Disaster, The Icarus Line and Alec Empire. In late 2002, the band signed to Integrity Records / Xtra Mile Recordings, and released their first single, "Smiling At Strangers On Trains". The video for the single, directed by Adam Mason, proved controversial as it featured scenes of a homeless man urinating through a letterbox, as well as on Dean.

The single received support from John Peel, Mike Davies, Mary Anne Hobbs and Steve Lamacq, helping the band secure a support slot with Pitchshifter on their farewell tour.

The band entered the studio in April 2003 to record their debut album, A Song to Ruin, released in September, along with the single "Breaking The Back". In December 2003, following a tour with Funeral for a Friend, Million Dead embarked on their first headline tour of the UK in support of the album, supported by Jarcrew and Minus.

In 2004, guitarist Cameron Dean announced he was leaving the band and was replaced by Tom Fowler. After a series of festival dates over the summer, the band re-entered the studio to record a new album. Written and recorded in eight weeks, Harmony No Harmony was released in May 2005, followed by another UK headline tour with Engerica and Days of Worth, and support dates on Finch's UK tour.

Million Dead remixed the song "Pop Idol" by Blade, providing an instrumental-only arrangement for the rapper, the original song having previously appeared on his earlier record "Storms Are Brewing".

In September 2005, it was announced via the band's official website that Million Dead were to call it a day at the conclusion of their September tour, as "irreconcilable differences within the band mean that it would be impossible to continue". The band played their final concert at Southampton's Joiners venue on 23 September 2005.

Since the band's breakup, vocalist Frank Turner has made a career as a solo folk/punk artist. Tom Fowler and Julia Ruzicka played guitar and bass in another band, Quiet Kill (2005–2006) and then Who Owns Death TV (2007–2009), and The Idle Hearts in 2009. Ben Dawson currently plays drums for Palehorse, Mothlite, Queen of Swords, Armed Response Unit and Mïngle Härde; a hardcore punk band he formed with Frank Turner and Matt Nasir of Turner's backing band, The Sleeping Souls. Ruzicka also currently plays bass with Future of the Left, and played bass for Dream of an Opium Eater and Tricky on their tour in 2010. In November 2016, Ruzicka released her debut album under the name This Becomes Us. The album features 10 tracks written by Ruzicka and featuring Ian Wilson of Art Brut on guitar and Jack Egglestone of Future of the Left on drums. The first nine tracks on the album feature vocals recorded by what Ruzicka describes as "9 very different, and very inspiring vocalists", including Black Francis.

In 2011, Turner commented on the band's break-up. "I'm very proud of all the music we made in that band," he said. "It came to an end. The actual process of that end wasn't very fun. I wouldn't be doing what I'm doing now if I hadn't done Million Dead before. I'm glad it happened. Once the end of Million Dead rolled around, I just didn't want to be in a band anymore. The last year of Million Dead was just murderous. Four people who want to kill each other, sat in a van driving around Europe...it's no fun." Turner has continued to perform "Smiling At Strangers On Trains" live since the split of the band, often including it in solo sets. In 2019, Mïngle Härde also began playing the song.

On 17 October 2024 an Instagram account was created, hinting at a 2025 reunion. On 23 October 2024 it was announced that a reunion would be taking place in 2025 consisting of Frank Turner, Julia Ruzicka, Tom Fowler, Ben Dawson and Cameron Dean. Turner stated during the shows that there would be no new album and this would be the last tour for the band.

== Discography ==
=== Studio albums ===
List of albums, with selected chart positions
Title	Album details	Peak chart positions		
Title	Album details	UK	UK Rock	UK Indie
A Song to Ruin	Released: 1 September 2003; Label: Xtra Mile Recordings/Integrity Records; Formats: CD, DL	154	17	14
Harmony No Harmony	Released: 16 May 2005; Label: Xtra Mile Recordings; Formats: CD, DL	109	4	11

=== Singles ===
Title	Year	Peak chart positions				Album
Title	Year	UK	UK Rock	UK Indie	SCO	Album
"Smiling At Strangers On Trains"	2003	128	14	48	—	A Song to Ruin
"Breaking The Back"	2003	100	—	21	—	A Song to Ruin
"I am the Party"	2003	82	8	9	83	A Song to Ruin
"I Gave My Eyes To Stevie Wonder"	2004	72	9	9	75	Non album single
"Living the Dream"	2005	60	—	9	67	Harmony No Harmony
"After The Rush Hour"	2005	—	—	—	—	Harmony No Harmony
"To Whom It May Concern"	2005	—	—	—	—	Harmony No Harmony
"—" denotes a recording that did not chart or was not released in that territory.

=== Demos ===
- "Million Dead (First Demo)" - September 2001
- "Million Dead (Second Demo)" - June 2002

== Videography ==
- "Smiling At Strangers On Trains"
- "Breaking The Back"
- "I Am The Party"
- "I Gave My Eyes To Stevie Wonder"
- "Living The Dream"
- "After The Rush Hour"
- "To Whom It May Concern"
- "Pornography For Cowards"
