= Allan Winter Rowe =

Allan Winter Rowe (31 July 1879 – 6 December 1934) was an American biochemist and physiological chemist who worked as a professor at Boston University. Although not trained in medicine, he conducted extensive chemical researches relating to human physiology including major works on the endocrine secretions and their role in various disorders.

Rowe was born in Gloucester, Massachusetts to Arthur Howard and Lucy Haskell Rowe. He was educated at the Massachusetts Institute of Technology receiving a BS in 1901 after which he went to the Wesleyan University where he received an MS in 1904. He then went to the University of Göttingen and studied under Walther Nernst, receiving a PhD in 1906. He then continued study at Harvard University under Theodore William Richards. He began to teach chemistry briefly at the Wesleyan University in 1902 but was a faculty at the Boston University from 1906 teaching chemistry.

Despite his Boston University affiliation, Rowe remained active in MIT affairs and passionate about the Institute. He took an early interest in developing athletics at the Institute, and was secretary of the advisory council on athletics for 23 years. "He contributed perhaps more than any other individual to the development of student athletics at the Institute," reported the MIT news service in July 1935.

Rowe was also president of the MIT Alumni Association from 1932-1933

Beloved by MIT's students as well, the MIT newspaper ran a front-page banner headline, "Dr. Allan W. Rowe Dies" on December 7, 1934, which featured a front-page editorial noting "with the passing of Dr. Allan Winter Rowe, Technology has lost one of its most loyal friends. His untimely death has brought to an end a career of notable service to science, to his Alma Mater, and to his community, but the institutions he has developed will exist as long as there is athletic competition at the Institute."
