= Repeat Records =

British independent record label

Repeat Records (aka R*E*P*E*A*T Records) is a British independent record label, fanzine and music promoter, based in Swansea, South Wales and with links to its home of 24 years, Cambridge, England.

R*E*P*E*A*T began as a fanzine, started in 1994 by Cambridge schoolteacher Richard Rose under his stage name Rosey R*E*P*E*A*T. Originally a messy cut and paste homage to the literature and adrenaline fuelled genius of Manic Street Preachers, it grew in subsequent issues to include articles about the local and national music scene, socialist and anti-racist issues and other polemical rants, images, poems and opinions. After a few years the fanzine enjoyed one of the largest print runs in the country. Much of its content gradually became web based, with its site repeatfanzine.co.uk reportedly attracting 4 million hits from 300,000 users in 2018. In 2011 a book compiling many of the articles and photos from the early printed issues, along with a compilation CD, was published.

The fanzine quickly evolved into live music promotion and a label; this latter began in 1997 with the issue of a white label vinyl free with the fanzine. The track 'Patrick' by Cambridge band Freeboy was played on Radio One by Steve Lamacq, who has been a consistent supporter of the label ever since.

Repeat Records has subsequently released records by such bands as Miss Black America, The Dawn Parade, Chris TT, Attila the Stockbroker, Johnny Panic, Horse Party and S*M*A*S*H as well as local groups including The Baby Seals, The Virgin Suicides, Deep City and Beverley Kills.

The label works closely with like-minded allies in Bury St Edmunds 'Rock City', and has released a series of vinyl albums 'This is the Sound of Sugar Town' championing the scene, featuring the likes of Horse Party, Gaffa Tape Sandy and Tundra.

In the mid-2000s the label established their own DIY Recording Space, the Big Badger Music Shack, and this has been used to record many of the tracks featured on the series of Flexi Discs 'You Flexi Things', which have been released for Record Store Days and have been regularly played on national radio. The studio is also used to encourage young talent and has helped promote many of the acts featured at R*E*P*E*A*T's series of Young Performer's Gigs, a tradition reaching back to 2002 when R*E*P*E*A*T starlets, The Hammers, appeared live on Blue Peter, aged 10–12. In 2022 the trick was repeated when Swansea's Atomic Beat Boys released their own take on the Shampoo (duo) classic Trouble, recorded in their year 6 classroom, along with remixes by local legends Helen Love and Teen Anthems.

In 2018 Rose and the label returned to hometown Swansea where they continue to promote gigs, encourage new writers, and release records. In 2024 the label celebrated its 30th year with rowdy all day gigs in Swansea and Cambridge, a rewriting of 'Book' as 'Book Too', an updated T-shirt featuring the names of all the bands to have featured on the label R*E*P*E*A*T so far, and all sorts of other excitements. This followed on from the release earlier in the year of two 12" vinyl albums, Leeks and Beets (featuring Acid Alchemist, Bad Shout, Monet and The Monoliths) and then 'Lovely Ugly / Pretty Shitty', a 13 track splatter vinyl compilation of underground Swansea guitar bands, augmented by a couple of local legends. This was a long time ambition achieved! Early in 2025 saw the release of a powerful and poignant spoken word 'A Constellation of Sorrows' about the situation in Gaza, by long time inspiration, penpal and mentor Patrick Jones (poet): Rose and Jones first corresponded in 1991 via the address printed on the reverse of the Manics' Stay Beautiful single.
