= Dan Kavanagh =

British rock drummer

- Instrument: Drums

Dan Kavanagh is a British rock drummer best known for his work with Jamie Lenman and Godsized. In May 2014 he was listed as one of the top 10 British drumming newcomers by Rhythm, who called him a "hard hitting rock fiend juggling two intense gigs". He has since become a contributor to Rhythm.

In 2017, The Independent called Dan "an extremely proficient drummer" and in 2018 Kerrang! described him as "wonder-drummer Dan Kavanagh".
