= Racecar Is Racecar Backwards =

Studio album by Reuben
- Released: 21 June 2004
- Recorded: July–November 2003
- Genres: Post-hardcore, alternative metal, alternative rock
- Length: 48:28
- Label: Xtra Mile
- Producer: Jason Wilson

Reuben chronology
Pilot (2001)	Racecar Is Racecar Backwards (2004)	Very Fast Very Dangerous (2005)

Singles from Racecar Is Racecar Backwards
- 1. "Let's Stop Hanging Out" Released: 27 January 2003; 2. "Stuck in my Throat" Released: 10 November 2003; 3. "Freddy Krueger" Released: 7 June 2004; 4. "Moving to Blackwater" Released: 16 August 2004

Professional ratings
Review scores
Source	Rating
Drowned in Sound	9/10

Racecar Is Racecar Backwards is the debut full-length album by the British rock band Reuben. It was recorded between July and November 2003, and was produced by Jason Wilson at Stakeout Studios when it was based in Chobham. The album's third single, "Freddy Krueger", placed 53rd on the UK Singles Charts and is the band's most recognized song.

== Music and lyrics ==
The music on "Racecar is Racecar Backwards" has been described as taking influence from a wide array of genres including nu-metal, math rock, grunge, emo and pop rock. The main riff of the song "Song for Saturday" was made up on the spot by Jamie when the band's manager asked to hear their new song in soundcheck. The album features the song "Eating Only Apples", a song previously heard as a b-side on the band's debut single, "Scared of the Police." It was originally called 'Tonight My Wife Is Your Wife', but Andy Ross from Food records was so upset when the name of the song was changed to something more relevant to the subject matter, the band promised to call another song 'Tonight...' The version of "Stuck in my Throat" heard on the album was re-recorded after the single version was finished and before work on the album started, in order to meet the release deadline imposed by Integrity records. Both the single and album version are exactly the same tempo and can be played in perfect unison side by side.

The line 'party hardy marty' in 'Parties Break Hearts' was copied from the last scene in the film Scrooged, starring Bill Murray. Although the lyrics hadn't been finalised in early performances, the 'Hell Is for Heroes' line in 'No One Wins the War' was written a few weeks before the two bands toured together. The line was subsequently changed to something new about Hell Is For Heroes on most nights of the tour, and in later performances. The song "Freddy Kreuger" was written as an auto-biographical song about touring for "fleeting recognition." It would reach number 53 in the UK Singles Charts and go on to become the band's biggest song drawing comparisons to Pop-Punk bands such as Weezer and Fall Out Boy.

== Track listing ==
No.	Title	Length
1.	"No One Wins the War"	3:41
2.	"Horrorshow"	2:58
3.	"Stuck in My Throat"	3:27
4.	"Oh the Shame"	2:09
5.	"Fall of the Bastille"	4:09
6.	"Freddy Kreuger"	2:28
7.	"Tonight My Wife Is Your Wife"	3:07
8.	"Eating Only Apples"	2:03
9.	"Our Song"	1:56
10.	"Let's Stop Hanging Out"	2:54
11.	"Missing Fingers"	4:00
12.	"Song for Saturday"	2:55
13.	"Moving to Blackwater"	2:49
14.	"Wrong and Sorry"	3:21
15.	"Parties Break Hearts"	2:34
16.	"Dusk"	3:55
Total length:		48:28

== Personnel ==
- Jamie Lenman – Guitars, vocals, piano
- Jon Pearce – Bass, vocals
- Guy Davis – Drums

=== Additional musicians ===
- Nic Slack – Piano on 'No-One Wins the War'
- Neil Lancaster – 7-String guitar on 'Moving to Blackwater' and 'Freddy Kreuger'
- The Galaxy Quartet – Strings

== Chart performance ==
Chart (2004)	Peak position
Scottish Albums (Official Charts)	99
UK Albums (Official Charts)	88
UK Independent Albums (Official Charts)	6
UK Rock & Metal Albums (Official Charts)	6
