= Engerica =

English rock band

- Origin: Essex, England
- Genres: Alternative rock, alternative metal, grunge, punk rock, emo, indie pop, screamo
- Years active: 2000–2006
- Labels: Fierce Panda Records, Wrath Records, Infectious Records, Sanctuary Records
- Past members: David Gardner; Mike Webster; Neil-Ross Gregory
- Website: http://www.engerica.com

Engerica were an English alternative rock band heavily influenced by metal, grunge and punk. The several styles incorporated into their music made them difficult to categorise for music fans and industry professionals. They were formed in Essex in 2000. Despite that the band gained a cult like following and towards the end of their career received support from major British music industry publications including Kerrang!, Rock Sound, Big Cheese and Metal Hammer music magazines.

== Members and history ==
Engerica formed in Essex in 2000 featuring David Gardner on lead vocals and guitar, Mike Webster on Bass and backing vocals and Neil-Ross Gregory on drums, percussion and backing vocals. Their name was believed to be a combination of England and America but the band never confirmed or denied this. In December, 2000 the band played their first show. The band's tracks featured on many compilation albums including Fierce Panda Records, plus via Rock Sound, Kerrang! and Metal Hammer magazines.

Their debut single "The Detective Show" was self-released. Many of the band's earliest self-released music was available in analog format on cassette tape and compact disc. The band's first official single "Trick or Treat" was independently released on Wrath Records in 2003. The same year the band signed to London based independent label Infectious Records, where they put out further singles including "The Detective Show" and "The Smell". These singles were available as physical compact discs, often in limited quantities. Much of their music was released before the widespread advent of digital music downloading.

In January 2005, Engerica signed to Sanctuary Records and recorded their only album, There Are No Happy Endings, which after delays was eventually released March 13, 2006 to mixed reviews. The band's eclectic and mixed musical styles made their sound difficult to market and promote despite a loyal albeit modest fan base. The same year the band featured on the Metal Hammer Awards 2006 DVD given away exclusively with the magazine in stores. The band were nominated for "Best British Newcomer 2006" but did not win.

Their debut album was made up largely of previously released singles which had been re-recorded and given a more professional production sound. The album disappointed some longtime fans who were eager for new material. The band's last official single was a re-release of "The Smell", featuring the re-recorded version from their debut album. The single release was accompanied by a short UK tour in support of the album and single. The band announced on Wednesday 23 August 2006 that they would be going their separate ways as of November 2006. Their final gig was a sold out, Halloween inspired show held on 26 October 2006 at Chinnerys in Southend-on-Sea.

== Band members post Engerica work ==
Bassist Mike Webster began his own solo project in late 2005, showing new material at intimate acoustic shows and open-mic nights around London. He began to record his new material with backing band prior to Engerica's mutual split. He co-wrote many songs with his identical twin brother James 'Jim' Webster. Some of his set lists included acoustic versions of songs he'd contributed to Engerica. The year after the split in 2007, Webster returned to the music scene with his new band named Baddies, co-founded and fronted with his twin brother. The band achieved moderate success before disbanding in 2012. Mike Webster is now bassist for the band Asylums, whose debut album was released on Cool Thing Records in 2016 to positive reviews. The band's latest album Alien Human Emotions was released on Cool Thing Records on 4 July 2018.

Vocalist and guitarist David Gardner began working as a film and media studies teacher, while attending university to study. After graduating university and qualifying as a music teacher, he was a full time tutor at a Sixth Form college near London. As of 2018, he is a media and film teacher at the King John School in Benfleet, Essex.

Drummer Neil-Ross Gregory drummed for other bands and music projects including work as a session musician after Engerica's initial break.

== Discography ==
=== Album ===
- There Are No Happy Endings (13 March 2006) Sanctuary Records

=== Singles ===
| Year | Title | Format | Label |
|---|---|---|---|
| 2002 | "My Demise" | CD | (self released) |
| 2003 | "Trick or Treat?" | CD | Wrath Records |
| 2004 | "The Smell" | CD | Kennel Records |
| 2005 | "My Demise" (re-release) | CD / 7" | Sanctuary Records |
| 2005 | "Roadkill" | CD / Maxi CD / 7" | Sanctuary Records |
| 2006 | "The Smell" (re-release) | CD1 / CD2 | Sanctuary Records |

=== Music videos ===
- Roadkill (2005)
- The Smell (2006)

=== Other ===
Demo, compilation albums, compilation EPs

| Year | Title | Type | Featured Song/s |
|---|---|---|---|
| 2000/2001 | The Pink Tape | Demo Cassette | 'Nobody's Saviour', 'Groaner' and 'The Brown Grass' |
| (Never released) | Don't Think! | compilation EP | Unknown |
| 2003 | The Squirrel EP | compilation EP | Crooked Sex |
| 2004 | Doo...Wutchyalike | compilation CD | Crooked Sex |
| 2004 | Metal Hammer: The Razor Vol 1 | compilation CD | Funeral Song |
| 2004 | Rocksound compilation | compilation CD | Roadkill |
| 2004 | Subverse Vol 2:'Subverse by Name...Subverse by Nature | compilation CD | Reasons to be Fearful (Part 1) |

== See also ==
- List of bands from England
