= In Nothing We Trust =

Studio album by Reuben
- Released: 25 June 2007
- Recorded: November – December 2006 at Soul Vally Studios and Dog House Studios
- Length: 51:25
- Label: Hideous Records; Big Scary Monsters Recording Company
- Producer: Sean Genockey; Reuben

Reuben chronology
Very Fast Very Dangerous (2005)	In Nothing We Trust (2007)

Professional ratings
Review scores
Source	Rating
Drowned in Sound	8/10 stars
Kerrang!	4/5 stars
Louder Sound	5/5 stars

In Nothing We Trust is Reuben's third studio album, released on 25 June 2007. It was mastered in February 2007 by Howie Weinberg (Nirvana, Engerica, Helmet) in New York. The album was recorded, produced and mixed at Livingstone Studios in London and Soul Valley Studios in Wimbledon by Sean Genockey (Engerica, Smother) with additional engineering by Ed Woods (credited as Edrin Piece). The band uploaded short videos on YouTube for each day in the recording studio. These videos are on the band's DVD, What Happens in Aldershot Stays in Aldershot, and can also be seen on YouTube.

== Background ==
The album was the first to be released on Reuben's self-run label, Hideous Records. On 29 March 2007, the band revealed the first single from the album will be titled, "Blood, Bunny, Larkhall", due for release a week prior to the album.

In an interview on rockmidgets.com, singer Jamie noted that fans can expect "Long songs. Nice artwork [and] More funny long titles". In comparing INWT to its predecessor Very Fast Very Dangerous, the band expressed a clear preference for the new album, suggesting that it "feels more natural and raw sounding", with "more depth" compared to the "straightforward" sound of the 2005 album. More recently in Rock Sound Magazine Jamie admitted "we've had to let go and say 'Blatantly, it's our best one'."

Frank Turner, Hannah Clark (of Hampshire band Arthur) and Paul Townsend (ex-Hundred Reasons) are guest vocalists which can be seen in the studio videos. The song "Three Hail Marys" was written at the same time as "Return of the Jedi", the penultimate track on Very Fast Very Dangerous. "Three Hail Marys" was considered for that album, but instead "Return of the Jedi" took its place as mentioned by Guy in an interview with Glasswerk.co.uk.

On 18 May 2007, the finalized track list and cover artwork were revealed. On 17 July 2007, the band announced that the second single from the album would be "Deadly Lethal Ninja Assassin" to be released on 24 September.

Following the album's release the band performed a UK tour in September 2007 as well as playing a main stage set at Download Festival.

== Track listing ==
1. "Cities on Fire" – 3.46
2. "We're All Going Home in an Ambulance" – 5.43
3. "Suffocation of the Soul" – 6.59
4. "Deadly Lethal Ninja Assassin (Ft. Frank Turner & Paul Townsend)" – 4.49
5. "An Act of Kindness" – 4.29
6. "Crushed Under the Weight of the Enormous Bullshit" – 4.10
7. "Good Luck (Ft. Hannah Clark)" – 3.35
8. "Agony/Agatha" – 2.56
9. "Three Hail Marys" – 6.48
10. "Blood, Bunny, Larkhall" – 2.39
11. "A Short History of Nearly Everything" – 5.31

== Reissue ==
On 25 June 2017 it was announced on the BBC Radio 1 rock show that the album was to receive a tenth anniversary reissue via Big Scary Monsters Recording Company. The album is to be pressed to white vinyl, with a release date of 14 July 2017 confirmed. In Nothing We Trust appeared on streaming services for the first time the day after the announcement.
