= Very Fast Very Dangerous =

Studio album by Reuben
- Released: 12 September 2005
- Recorded: February – March 2005
- Genre: Rock
- Length: 51:59
- Label: Xtra Mile
- Producer: Chris Sheldon

Reuben chronology
Racecar Is Racecar Backwards (2004)	Very Fast Very Dangerous (2005)	In Nothing We Trust (2007)

Professional ratings
Review scores
Source	Rating
AllMusic	Not Rated link
Drowned in Sound	4/10 link

Very Fast Very Dangerous is the second album by British rock band Reuben, released in September 2005. The album was produced by Chris Sheldon at Raezor Studios.

== Reception ==
The album entered #4 in the UK Rock Charts in its first week. It made #87 in the mainstream chart, and one place higher than "Racecar Is Racecar Backwards".

== Track listing ==
1. "A Kick in the Mouth" - 3.25
2. "Some Mothers Do 'Ave 'Em" - 4.02
3. "Best Enemies" - 3.35
4. "It's All About Control" - 2.44
5. "Every Time a Teenager Listens to Drum and Bass a Rockstar Dies" - 5.11
6. "Nobody Loves You" - 4.54
7. "Blamethrower" - 3.10
8. "Keep It to Yourself" - 2.35
9. "Lights Out" - 4.11
10. "Alpha Signal Three" (feat. Karl Middleton) - 3.01
11. "Good Night" - 3.38
12. "Return of the Jedi" - 7.22
13. "Boy" - 4.06

== Personnel ==
- Jamie Lenman - Guitars, vocals, piano
- Jon Pearce - Bass, vocals
- Guy Davis - Drums

== Singles ==
Date	Single	UK Singles Chart	Notes
April 2005	Blamethrower	-	Download only single
June 2005	A Kick in the Mouth	59	
September 2005	Keep It to Yourself	62	
February 2006	Every Time A Teenager Listens To Drum & Bass A Rockstar Dies	219	Split 7" w/Frank Turner
