= Pilot (Reuben EP) =

Pilot EP

EP by Reuben
- Released: 2001
- Genres: Rock, Metal
- Length: 13.25
- Label: Badmusic

Reuben chronology
Hand Over Fist (1999)	Pilot EP (2001)	Racecar Is Racecar Backwards (2004)

The Pilot EP was the first official release by British rock band Reuben. This recording was with the original Reuben line up, including Mark Lawton on drums. It was recorded in the summer of 2000 at Backline studios in Guildford with ex Redwood guitarist Rob Blackham. The band had met Rob at Guildford festival, where he urged them to record a demo of some sort, so they set about recording five songs in four days. The EP was released on the Badmusic label in January 2001. The initial run was of 500 copies, which sold out fairly fast, but it is regularly repressed and is available at shows and by mail order. It was reviewed in Kerrang! by members of Taproot, and received a KKKK rating, despite being described as 'cheesey' by the singer.

== Track listing ==
1. "Alpha Signal Seven"
2. "Words From Reuben"
3. "Crimson"
4. "Death of a Star"
5. "Shambles" (hidden track only on the first 500 copies – click for free download from the band's official site)

== Personnel ==
- Jamie Lenman – guitar, vocals
- Jon Pearce – bass guitar
- Mark Lawton – drums

== Miscellanea ==
- "Alpha Signal Seven" gained the band an early following by being played by DJ Steve Lamacq a number of times by the on his BBC Radio 1 show. It was also the track that convinced Badmusic to put out the EP.
- "Words From Reuben" was the song the band named themselves after. The title makes reference to receiving a letter from an old friend; 'Reuben' having been the first friend that Jamie ever made. It was decided to shorten the band name to just Reuben, because the band cited the longer version as "way too emo". The song was the first to be written with drummer Mark in the band. It was also featured on the Farnborough Groove Volume 9 compilation. The funny phased guitar sounds heard on the song were originally just for fun but were left in when the band ran out of time to mix.
- "Crimson" is said by the band to be "a failed attempt to sound like the Deftones". This is a big live favourite and was played a couple of times on XFM around the time of the initial EP release.
- "Death of a Star" was written when the band were named Angel and with drummer and producer Jason Wilson, the song was a favourite of the band's at the time. It used to be the standard set-opener from their days at the Tumbledown.
- The first pressing of the EP (the first 500 copies) included a secret track, "Shambles". The track can be downloaded in full at the band's website.
- Reuben were unsure of whether or not they had enough money to record the EP, but decided to go for it after they won £100 in a battle of the bands competition staged in Bookham barn hall in front of a panel of twelve-year-olds.
- The band changed their name from Angel to Reuben just before the release, for fear that it might get overlooked if it were under a different name.
