= Reuben (band) =

English rock band

- Jon Pearce (left) and Jamie Lenman (right) pictured in 2007.

Background information
- Origin: Camberley, Surrey, England
- Genres: Alternative rock; hard rock; post-hardcore; alternative metal
- Years active: 1998–2008 (hiatus) 2027-
- Labels: Badmusic; Boss; Xtra Mile; Hideous Records; Big Scary Monsters
- Members: Jamie Lenman; Jon Pearce; Guy Davis
- Past members: Jason Wilcock; Mark Lawton
- Website: Official website

Reuben are an English rock band formed in Camberley in 1998. They comprise of singer and guitarist Jamie Lenman, bassist Jon Pearce and drummer Guy Davis. Jason Wilcock was the bands original drummer, but was replaced by Mark Lawton and later by Davis in 2003.

They released three studio albums Racecar Is Racecar Backwards (2004), Very Fast Very Dangerous (2005) and In Nothing We Trust (2007) before disbanding in 2008.

In November 2026 it was announced that the band were reuniting to play at 2000trees Festival in 2027.

== History ==
=== 1998–2002: Formation and Pilot ===
Singer and guitarist Jamie Lenman and bassist Jon Pearce met in 1996 through a shared guitar teacher, who suggested that they form a band together. They subsequently played together in several bands. In 1998, they formed Angel with drummer Jason Wilcock. The trio recorded its first CD demo, Betrayed, in 1999 at the University of Surrey's studios. The free of charge sessions were recorded by students at the university. The band later said that the demo helped them secure gigs. By the summer of 2000, the band's line-up consisted of Lenman, Pearce and drummer Mark Lawton. Nirvana were a shared influence, while Lenman lateridentified Far's Water & Solutions as particularly influential during this period. When Lawton joined, the band gave him a copy of the album as a guide to the music they wanted to make. Angel used a £100 prize from a local battle-of-the-bands competition towards recording their debut EP, Pilot. The five tracks were recorded that summer, followed by five further demos with Lawton at the end of the year. Lenman later described the Pilot sessions as "incredibly traumatic", recalling that he lost his voice during recording, which he attributed to the stress of the sessions.

While Pilot was being prepared for release, the band changed its name to Reuben. The name came from their song "Words from Reuben", which was dedicated to Lenman's first friend. They initially considered calling themselves Wordsfromreuben before settling on the shorter name. Before the EP's release, Lawton announced plans to spend time in Canada and the band sought a temporary replacement. Guy Davis, who played in a college band called Descent, was recommended by the manager of Backline Studios in Guildford, where both bands rehearsed. After listening to a four-track Angel demo, Davis auditioned at the studio and was selected after several drummers had been tried. Pilot was released through Badmusic in early 2001 and received a favourable review in Kerrang!, as well as airplay from Steve Lamacq on BBC Radio 1. During Davis's initial period with the band, they recorded with producer Paul Tipler. Lawton subsequently returned and briefly resumed playing with the group, recording further material with Tipler. After Lawton decided to attend university, Lenman invited Davis to rejoin permanently.

The band promoted their performances through a postal mailing list, collecting addresses at concerts and sending photocopied newsletters and flyers designed by Lenman. Pearce recalled preparing approximately 1,000 mailings at a time, with the aim of building an audience beyond their existing friends. Reuben began playing London venues including the Barfly and the Bull and Gate, attracting interest from record labels. In late 2001, they met Andy Ross of Food Records. According to Pearce, both promoter Barney Jevons and a guitarist from the Swedish band Fungus recommended Reuben to Ross, who attended a performance at the Bull and Gate. Ross subsequently arranged an EMI publishing demo session that produced the recording of "Scared of the Police". The proposed deal with Food Records failed to come to fruition after Ross left the label.

=== 2002–2003: Early singles ===
Ross released "Scared of the Police" through his own Boss label in 2002. The single was issued in a limited edition of 1,000 copies and reached number 87 on the UK Singles Chart. By late April, the edition had sold out. The music video for "Scared of the Police" received airplay on MTV2 and had spent approximately a month in the channel's Most Wanted chart by April 2002. Pearce later recalled that the television exposure helped the band attract a wider audience. Reuben also recorded a live session for Xfm, performing "Tonight My Wife Is Your Wife", "Parties Break Hearts" and "Fall of the Bastille".

By April 2002, Reuben were recording material for a second single. They were announced as support for Wilt at the Camden Underworld on 11 June. In July and early August, they undertook a UK headline tour. Reuben were also advertised for Truck Festival on 20 July. "Stux (Tell Me It's Alright)" was announced for release on 5 August through Boss. It reached number 86 on the UK Singles Chart that month. Its video also received MTV2 airplay. In the 3 August issue of NME, Andre Paine criticised the lyrics and Lenman's vocals on "Stux". The same issue carried a positive review by Steve Braund of the band's performance at Wolverhampton's Little Civic, describing them as "a very special talent". By July, following their single releases on Boss, Drowned in Sound reported the band were seeking a more substantial record deal and, were aiming to release an album in April 2003. Reuben were announced as the support act for Mclusky's September 2002 UK tour. In September, the band were interviewed for Steve Lamacq's Evening Session on BBC Radio 1. They were also announced Kerrang!'s festival at Camber Sands on 5 October. By late November, they were touring with Hell Is for Heroes.

In January 2003, Reuben undertook a UK headline tour promoted by Drowned in Sound in support of their next single, "Let's Stop Hanging Out". The single was released on 27 January through Badmusic, reaching number 90 on the UK Singles Chart. A review in NME criticised the single's lack of ideas and frequent shouting. Brian E. Jemimah of Drowned in Sound awarded it 7/10, praising its energy and charisma. In February, Reuben toured with Kinesis and Miss Black America.

Despite interest from several record companies, the band remained without an album deal and decided to finance the recording of their debut album themselves. The members continued to hold jobs alongside their work in the band. By April 2003, they were recording demos at Stakeout Studios in Chobham, Surrey. In preparation for the album, they also recorded demos of their repertoire over approximately two days. These recordings included new versions of material from Pilot and their independent singles, alongside songs intended for the album. The band recorded their debut album at Stakeout Studios, working with Jason Wilcock between July and November 2003. The band said that they wanted to assemble their strongest material because they were unsure whether they would have the opportunity to make another album. They initially planned to record 18 songs and select 14, but time constraints meant that only 16 were completed; they decided to include all the completed tracks.

Having recently supported Biffy Clyro, Reuben undertook a UK headline tour in autumn 2003 to promote "Stuck in My Throat". The single was announced for release on 3 November, with the debut album expected in early 2004. It was released in 2003 through Xtra Mile/Integrity as the first single from their forthcoming debut album, Racecar Is Racecar Backwards. It reached number 77 on the UK Singles Chart. According to the band's website, Zane Lowe selected it as his single of the week on BBC Radio 1, while Xfm declined to play it because it was "too heavy". In December 2003, Reuben invited fans to appear in the video for "Freddy Kreuger". Filming of the performance sequence was scheduled for 20 December at the West End Centre in Aldershot. Participants were to wear false moustaches, and the shoot was to be followed by a live set featuring songs from the forthcoming album.

=== 2004: Racecar Is Racecar Backwards ===
On 27 April 2004, the band announced that they had signed to Xtra Mile Recordings, with distribution through Vital UK/Sony. Lenman and Xtra Mile founder Charlie Caplowe later recalled that Caplowe's office had handled Reuben's publicity before he offered the band a record deal. Caplowe traced the label's name to his decision to continue through heavy traffic to a meeting with Reuben in Guildford rather than turn back.

In May, Lowe selected "Freddy Kreuger" as his single of the week on Radio 1. It also became the band's first single to be added to XFM's playlist. Reuben promoted the single and forthcoming album with a UK tour in May and early June. The Holiday Plan and Septembre were confirmed as support. The single had been provisionally scheduled for 31 May, before its release on 7 June 2004. Its video was added to MTV2's A-list that month. The single peaked at number 53 on the UK Singles Chart, becoming the band's highest-charting single to that point. Davis and Pearce later recalled that, during an earlier record-label showcase at Townhouse Studios, producer Bob Ezrin had advised them to drop the song because he felt it did not fit their other material. In June, the band recorded an appearance with Lowe for MTV2's Gonzo.

Racecar Is Racecar Backwards was released on 21 June 2004 through Xtra Mile Recordings, on CD and limited-edition vinyl. The band announced a series of release-week in-store performances, and Lowe selected the record as his album of the week on Radio 1. On 26 June, it entered BBC Radio 6 Music's Official New Music Chart at number one. It peaked at number 88 on the UK Albums Chart. The promotional campaign also included a live session for XFM. Writing for Gigwise in 2005, James Kirsch described the album as combining metal, emo, grunge and pop. In a contemporary review for Drowned in Sound, Stu Chown awarded the album 9/10, praising its musicianship and Lenman's movement between screaming and melodic singing. Writing for Sound of Violence, Fab praised the singles, particularly the rerecorded "Let's Stop Hanging Out", but argued that the album would have benefited from fewer tracks. Gigwise's Nick Mills praised Davis's drumming and saw promise in "Freddy Kreuger", but criticised the prevalence of screaming and some of the arrangements. Pearce said that the press response had been more favourable than the band had expected. In July, the band were included in Kerrang!'s "18 Bands You Must Know About" feature.

Reuben organised the Candy Floss and Rock Tour, a short tour of seaside towns to promote "Moving to Blackwater". The tour began along the English coast on 13 August. No Hope in New Jersey were announced as the support act for five dates. The album's third single, "Moving to Blackwater", followed on 16 August, and peaked at number 59 on the UK Singles Chart. Reuben were also announced for Kerrang!'s Day of Rock at the Virgin Megastore on Oxford Street on 24 August, on a bill that included Yourcodenameis:milo and Biffy Clyro. They were nominated for Best British Newcomer at the Kerrang! Awards that month. Reuben and the Bled were also announced as co-headliners for Kerrang!'s Most Wanted! tour, with five shows at Barfly venues scheduled for 2–8 September and support from Cry for Silence. Reuben also toured with Biffy Clyro in 2004 around the release of Biffy Clyro's Infinity Land. By October 2004, they had begun working on their second album, with further touring planned for the remainder of the year. By September 2005, sales of Racecar Is Racecar Backwards had exceeded 12,000 copies, according to Sound of Violence.

=== 2005–2006: Very Fast Very Dangerous ===
Prior to the release of Racecar Is Racecar Backwards the band had already performed a set of songs from what would become their second album, Very Fast Very Dangerous under a different name. By 12 January 2005, the band had recorded demos of 18 songs. For the album sessions, the band worked with producer Chris Sheldon at Raezor Studios in Wandsworth. Sheldon had recently produced Biffy Clyro's Infinity Land and was selected as producer for Reuben's second album after meeting whilst Reuben were supporting Biffy Clyro on tour. By January 2006, a studio update reported that production was underway and that recording the tracks live had accelerated the sessions. By 10 February, most instrumental and vocal parts for the planned 13 tracks were largely complete, with mixing scheduled for the following week. On 28 February, Davis reported that the album had been recorded and that the band were due to return to Raezor for a final week of mixing with Sheldon in March.

The first single from the album, "Blamethrower" was released as a download-only single on 18 April. The band undertook a UK tour that month to promote the single, with Dive Dive as the support band. In June, Reuben toured the UK to promote the next single, "A Kick in the Mouth". Frank Turner, then a member of Million Dead, was announced as acoustic support for the London Underworld show on 8 June. Reuben headlined the Snickers Bowl stage at the Download Festival on 11 June. "A Kick in the Mouth" was released on 13 June 2005 and reached 58 on the UK Singles Chart. The band also performed at GuilFest in July. By July, Xtra Mile reported that the video for "Keep It to Yourself" was receiving exposure on MTV2 and that Zane Lowe had played the song on BBC Radio 1. "Keep It to Yourself" was released on 5 September 2005, followed by the album, Very Fast Very Dangerous on 12 September through Xtra Mile Recordings. Release week included in-store appearances. During promotion for the album, Pearce and Lenman dismissed repeated predictions that the band was about to achieve a breakthrough. To promote the releases, the band announced nine UK headline dates for October 2005. Their autumn tour included their first performances in Ireland.

Davis described the new material as more straightforward than the debut, with simpler riffs but a greater contrast between softer and heavier songs. According to Davis, Sheldon suggested arrangement changes, including transferring some second-guitar parts to the bass, which brought the recordings closer to the band's live sound. Davis said that the album's title came from a phrase used by local band Drefuss in an interview to describe their music, performances and clothing. Reflecting on the production in 2018, Lenman said that he had wanted a looser, more live-sounding record and remained dissatisfied with its polished sound, particularly the bass. Mark Griffiths of Kerrang! awarded the album four Ks and considered it an improvement on Racecar Is Racecar Backwards, praising its intricate song structures, wordplay and black humour. He also highlighted the contrast between its heavy guitars and the string-accompanied ballad "Nobody Loves You". Gigwise's Jeff Ando criticised the repetitive riffs and the use of a drum machine, while finding "Keep It to Yourself" more successful. In a November review for Contactmusic, Sharon Edge compared much of the album to Nirvana's Bleach, identifying its grunge-style guitar sound as a unifying feature. She also praised its vocals and highlighted its heavy basslines. The album reached number 86 on the UK Albums Chart and number four on the UK Rock & Metal Albums Chart.

On 30 January 2006, Reuben released a split seven-inch single with Frank Turner as the fourth instalment of Xtra Mile's Single Sessions series. It paired Reuben's "Every Time a Teenager Listens to Drum & Bass a Rockstar Dies" with Turner's "The Real Damage". By February, the band reported rehearsing three times a week and developing approximately nine new songs. In March 2006, the band supported Fightstar, then in April performed a headline show at London's Mean Fiddler. In April, they also announced a Saturday appearance on the third stage at that year's Download Festival. Reuben supported Billy Talent on UK dates in July 2006. Later that year, they toured the UK and continental Europe with Billy Talent, marking their first European tour. Lenman later recalled that Billy Talent paid for Reuben to join them on a European tour. Pearce recalled that Billy Talent also let Reuben share their tour bus.

"Captain of Lies", a collaboration between Lenman, Davis and Yourcodenameis:milo, appeared on the latter's album Print Is Dead Vol 1, released on 6 November 2006. Lenman and Davis had travelled to Newcastle in August 2005 to write, rehearse and record the song in one day, using the name the Velvet Junior Terror Squad for the collaboration.

=== 2007–2008: Hideous Records and In Nothing We Trust ===
Writing for In Nothing We Trust overlapped with the final stages of releasing Very Fast Very Dangerous. Reflecting on the writing of In Nothing We Trust in 2017, Lenman recalled poor communication within the band and disagreements over the complexity of the songs. He said an argument during rehearsals had brought them close to splitting, but they continued because he wanted to complete the album. On 20 November 2006, Reuben began recording their third album, In Nothing We Trust, at Livingston Studios in London. The album was produced by Sean Genockey and engineered by Jack Ruston. By January 2007, the band were mixing the final tracks at Soul Valley Studios in Wimbledon. In February, Howie Weinberg was mastering the album in New York. During the sessions, the band shared short studio video diaries through MySpace and YouTube.

After leaving Xtra Mile Recordings, Reuben established their own label, Hideous Records, in late 2006. They announced the label's launch on 13 January 2007. The band sought greater control over how its music was released. They initially intended Hideous to release their own music, while leaving open the possibility of releasing other artists' work. The band had been negotiating distribution with Vital and set up a fan street team, the Hideous Squad, to help promote the label.

The band announced their first DVD in December 2006, titled What Happens in Aldershot Stays in Aldershot. It combined an hour-long documentary filmed over three months, following the members on tour, in the studio and at their day jobs, with a full recording of the band's 2006 Mean Fiddler concert. All three members continued to hold day jobs, arranging time away from work to tour. In a June 2007 interview, Lenman said he had recently moved from working in a fish and chip shop to an office job and still needed outside employment because the band did not pay enough. The album's studio video diaries were subsequently added, making it a two-disc release. It was released on 19 March 2007 through Hideous Records, with advance copies sold during the February tour.

For their February 2007 headline tour, Reuben chose small clubs and declined venue upgrades even when shows sold out. They intended the tour primarily for existing fans and wanted to become accustomed to headline sets again after a year without a headline tour. Hot Press reported that the band's show at London's 100 Club had sold out within hours. Reuben were also billed to perform at Four 4 Wiz, a benefit at London's Islington Academy on 4 March in memory of Mega City Four frontman Darren "Wiz" Brown, with profits intended for Phyllis Tuckwell Hospice and the International Fund for Animal Welfare. In May 2007, the band performed at the Great Escape in Brighton, Manifest in Southampton and the Rock City all-dayer in Nottingham. Reuben performed on the main stage at Download Festival on 10 June 2007. An acoustic set and a question-and-answer session were also scheduled on the festival's Nokia Rock-Up-and-Play stage. "Blood, Bunny, Larkhall" was released on 18 June 2007. Reuben were billed to headline the third stage at Hyde Park Calling on 24 June.

In Nothing We Trust was released through Hideous Records on 25 June 2007. The album reached number seven on the UK Independent Albums Chart and number eight on the UK Rock & Metal Albums Chart. Tim Newbound of Rock Sound awarded the album 9/10, praising its intricate arrangements and melodic hooks and considering it the band's strongest work to date. Kerrang! awarded the album four Ks and praised its inventiveness and range of musical ideas. In a four-star review for The Skinny, Dan Coxon praised the contrast between the album's heavier material and the melodic "Good Luck" and "Deadly Lethal Ninja Assassin", although he found the opening track, "Cities on Fire", less accessible. In a five-star review for Rocklouder, Zach Redrup praised the album's experimentation and range of ideas. Mark Keane of Hot Press praised the album's combination of heaviness and melody and Lenman's vocal performances, particularly on the acoustic "Good Luck".

The band's summer bookings included headline appearances on the second stage at Rip Curl Boardmasters in Newquay on 10 August and at Kerrang!'s Klub K! night at Koko in London on 18 August. To promote the album, Reuben announced UK dates for September and Irish dates for October. The album's second single, "Deadly Lethal Ninja Assassin", was released on 24 September 2007. The single reached number one on the UK Rock & Metal Singles Chart. The band's second session for Zane Lowe's BBC Radio 1 programme, at Maida Vale Studios, was scheduled for broadcast on 3 October 2007. On 26 November 2007, Reuben posted the video for "Christmas Is Awesome". The single was released worldwide through iTunes on 17 December, with the band seeking the UK Christmas number one. On 20 December, the band reported that the single had been disqualified from the UK charts after a registration error listed "Blood, Bunny, Larkhall" in its place.

Reuben were announced as the main support act on all dates of Sum 41's UK tour, scheduled for 21 February to 3 March 2008. In February 2008, Lenman released two guitar tutorials through Now Play It, demonstrating "Deadly Lethal Ninja Assassin" and "Stuck in My Throat". On 25 February, the band posted a video for "Cities on Fire" and announced three German shows in May as part of Give It a Name. In March 2008, Reuben released the TwoByThree EP, a split release through Hideous Records with Baddies and The Ghost of a Thousand. The EP contained two tracks by each band. A nine-date UK tour featuring all three bands was scheduled for 1–11 April, ending at London's Electric Ballroom. On 1 May 2008, Reuben announced the cancellation of their scheduled appearance at Brighton's Great Escape festival.

=== 2008-2026: Hiatus ===
In June 2008 it was announced via the bands website that they were "not planning any more gigs or releases for the foreseeable future" and had pulled out of 2000trees festival. The message went on to state that the members were on "amicable terms and are supportive of the need to call a halt".

Following the band's split, all three members went off into their own directions. Lenman stopped playing music for over a year to focus on his illustration work. However, after years of receiving letters from fans he was encouraged to get back into music which led to him releasing his debut solo album "Muscle Memory" in late 2013. Pearce and Davis however started the band Freeze the Atlantic and would go on to create 3 albums with that band before their eventual split in 2018. In June 2019, Guy Davis joined Lenman for his show at The Palm House in Belfast. He would then join Lenman as one of two of the touring drummers on Lenman's tour for his third solo album "Shuffle." Davis joined the band Attendant in 2024, featuring on the debut album State of Disarray.

On 24 July 2009, the band announced the release of a new rarities collection entitled We Should Have Gone To University. The collection, released on 24 August 2009, contained every non-album track the band released as well as rare demos and session tracks. In addition there was a DVD containing the band's full set at 2007's Download Festival as well as interviews, documentaries and all of the band's music videos. The artwork for the collection was drawn by Lenman and the collection was issued on Xtra Mile Recordings. In November 2014, to celebrate the 10th anniversary of their debut album, Reuben reissued Racecar Is Racecar Backwards through Xtra Mile Recordings. The release included the original album, demos, radio sessions and an interview. On 10 July 2015, the band reissued their second album Very Fast Very Dangerous. The 10th anniversary release through Xtra Mile included demos and non-album tracks. Celebrating the 10th anniversary of In Nothing We Trust, Big Scary Monsters reissued the album on 14 July 2017. In December 2020, the band released Racecar Is Very Fast, a compilation combining the bands first two records Racecar Is Racecar Backwards and Very Fast Very Dangerous through Xtra Mile. In 2023, Big Scary Monsters reissued the bands Pilot EP with five additional tracks. In November 2024 Big Scary Monsters announced the release of The Complete Stakeout Sessions, a collection of 41 demos which were recorded in 2003 in preparation for the recording of their debut album, Racecar Is Racecar Backwards. In October 2025 Xtra Mile Recordings released VFVD20, a compilation celebrating the 20th anniversary of the bands second album Very Fast Very Dangerous, which included the original album and its demos.

=== 2027-onwards: Reunion ===
On 5 November 2026 it was revealed Reuben would reunite for 2027 to perform at 2000trees festival in Cheltenham. Reuben had previously cancelled their 2008 appearance at the festival following their break-up.

== Influences and legacy ==
Reuben have cited influences including Nirvana, Queens of the Stone Age, Engerica, At the Drive-In, Refused, Tool, Coal Chamber, Garbage, Far, Glassjaw, Helmet, Nine Inch Nails, Every Time I Die, Strapping Young Lad, Sepultura and Limp Bizkit. On In Nothing We Trust, they began to take influence from their contemporaries Million Dead, Oceansize, Hundred Reasons and Biffy Clyro.

They have been cited as an influence by Alpha Male Tea Party, Pulled Apart by Horses, Fizzy Blood and Fangclub.

== Members ==
Current Members

- Jamie Lenman – Guitar, vocals, piano/keyboard (1998-present)
- Jon Pearce – Bass, backing vocals (1998 present)
- Guy Davis – drums, backing vocals (2003-present)

Former Members

- Jason Wilcock - drums (1998-2000)
- Mark Lawton - drums (2001-2003)

== Discography ==
Studio albums

- Racecar Is Racecar Backwards (2004)
- Very Fast Very Dangerous (2005)
- In Nothing We Trust (2007)
