= Frank Turner discography =

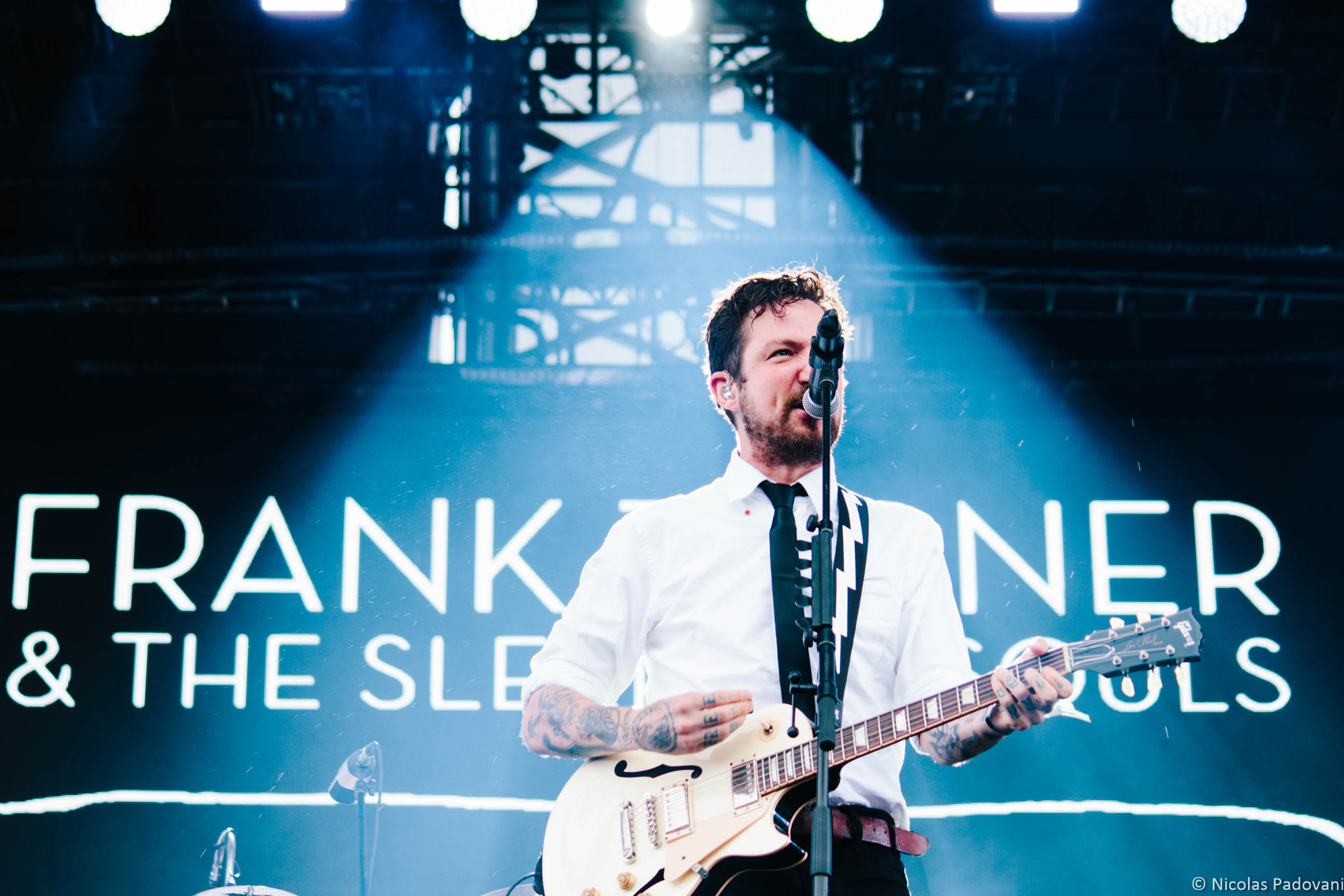
- Turner performing in 2018
- Studio albums: 10
- Extended plays: 13
- Live albums: 7
- Compilation albums: 6
- Singles: 40
- Video albums: 3
- Music videos: 18
- Collaborative releases: 8

English singer-songwriter Frank Turner has released ten solo studio albums, seven live albums, thirteen extended plays, six compilation albums, three video albums, thirty-six singles and eighteen music videos among other releases.

== Albums ==
=== Studio albums ===
Title	Details	Peak chart positions										Certifications
Title	Details	UK	AUS	AUT	BEL	CAN	GER	NLD	IRE	SWI	US	Certifications
Sleep Is for the Week	Released: 15 January 2007; Label: Xtra Mile; Format: Digital download, CD, LP	156	—	—	—	—	—	—	—	—	—	
Love Ire & Song	Released: 31 March 2008; Label: Xtra Mile, Epitaph; Format: Digital download, CD, LP	72	—	—	—	—	—	—	—	—	—	BPI: Gold
Poetry of the Deed	Released: 7 September 2009; Label: Xtra Mile, Epitaph; Format: Digital download, CD, LP	36	—	—	—	—	—	—	—	—	—	BPI: Silver
England Keep My Bones	Released: 6 June 2011; Label: Xtra Mile, Epitaph; Format: Digital download, CD, LP	12	—	—	—	—	—	94	—	—	143	BPI: Gold
Tape Deck Heart	Released: 22 April 2013; Label: Xtra Mile, Interscope; Format: Digital download, CD, LP, CC	2	—	34	138	—	21	—	61	79	52	BPI: Gold
Positive Songs for Negative People	Released: 7 August 2015; Label: Xtra Mile, Interscope; Format: Digital download, CD, LP	2	55	21	114	—	7	28	35	11	69	BPI: Silver
Be More Kind	Released: 4 May 2018; Label: Xtra Mile, Interscope; Format: Digital download, CD, LP, CC	3	—	19	—	87	12	—	55	25	95	
No Man's Land	Released: 16 August 2019; Label: Xtra Mile, Interscope; Format: Digital download, CD, LP, CC, streaming	3	—	49	—	—	22	—	—	61	—	
FTHC	Released: 11 February 2022; Label: Xtra Mile, Polydor; Format: Digital download, CD, LP, CC, streaming	1	—	—	—	—	9	—	—	84	—	
Undefeated	Released: 3 May 2024; Label: Xtra Mile; Format: Digital download, streaming	3	—	68	193	—	6	—	—	—	—	
"—" denotes an album that did not chart or was not released.

=== Compilation albums ===
Title	Details	Peak chart positions			Certifications
Title	Details	UK	US Folk	US Heat	Certifications
The First Three Years	Released: 1 December 2008; Label: Xtra Mile, Paper + Plastick; Format: Digital download, CD, LP	72	—	—	
The Second Three Years	Released: 18 November 2011; Label: Xtra Mile, Epitaph; Format: Digital download, CD	132	—	—	
Last Minutes & Lost Evenings	Released: 28 September 2012; Label: Xtra Mile, Epitaph; Format: Digital download, CD	—	15	16	
The Third Three Years	Released: 24 November 2014; Label: Xtra Mile; Format: Digital download, CD	67	—	—	
Ten for Ten	Released: 20 November 2015; Label: Xtra Mile, Interscope; Format: Digital download, CD	—	—	—	
Songbook	Released: 24 November 2017; Label: Xtra Mile; Format: Digital download, CD, LP	—	25	—	BPI: Silver
The Next 10 Years	Released: 7 November 2025; Label: Xtra Mile; Format: Digital download, LP	—	—	—	
"—" denotes an album that did not chart or was not released.

=== Live albums ===
Title	Details
Live at Union Chapel	Released: 19 December 2009; Label: Xtra Mile; Format: Digital download
Live at iTunes Festival London 2010	Released: 25 July 2010; Label: Xtra Mile; Format: Digital download
iTunes Session	Released: 1 January 2013; Label: Xtra Mile; Format: Digital download
Live from Shepherd's Bush	Released: 15 October 2013; Label: Xtra Mile; Format: Digital download
Live at the Vic, Swindon	Released: 27 January 2017; Label: Xtra Mile; Format: Digital download
Show 2000	Released: 13 December 2019; Label: Xtra Mile; Format: Digital download, CD
Live in Newcastle	Released: 24 April 2020; Label: Xtra Mile; Format: Digital download
Show 3000	Released: 1 August 2025; Label: Xtra Mile; Format: Digital download, CD

== Extended plays ==
Title	Details	Peak chart positions
Title	Details	US Folk
Campfire Punkrock	Released: 15 May 2006; Label: Xtra Mile; Format: Digital download, CD, 7"	—
The Real Damage	Released: 7 May 2007; Label: Xtra Mile; Format: Digital download	—
Buddies (with Jon Snodgrass)	Released: 24 September 2010; Label: Xtra Mile, Epitaph; Format: Digital download, CD, 12", 10"	—
Rock & Roll	Released: 6 December 2010; Label: Xtra Mile, Epitaph; Format: Digital download	—
Daytrotter Session	Released: 17 November 2011; Label: Daytrotter; Format: Digital download, streaming	—
Spotify Live EP	Released: 8 April 2013; Label: Xtra Mile; Format: Streaming	—
WiMP Live: Acoustic Session EP	Released: 26 August 2013; Label: Xtra Mile; Format: Digital download	—
Losing Days	Released: 1 September 2013; Label: Xtra Mile; Format: Digital download	—
Spotify Sessions	Released: 2013; Label: Xtra Mile; Format: Streaming	—
Polaroid Picture	Released: 3 February 2014; Label: Xtra Mile; Format: Digital download	—
Mittens	Released: 4 March 2016; Label: Xtra Mile; Format: Digital download	14
Don't Worry	Released: 24 January 2019; Label: Xtra Mile; Format: Digital download	—
Buddies II: Still Buddies (with Jon Snodgrass)	Released: 13 November 2020; Label: Xtra Mile, Epitaph; Format: Digital download, CD, LP	—
"—" denotes an album that did not chart or was not released.

== Singles ==
Title	Year	Peak chart positions					Album
Title	Year	UK	BE-VLG Tip	CAN Rock	US Alt.	US AAA	Album
"Vital Signs"	2006	—	—	—	—	—	Sleep Is for the Week
"Photosynthesis"	2008	—	—	—	—	—	Love Ire & Song
"Reasons Not to Be an Idiot"	2008	124	—	—	—	—	Love Ire & Song
"Long Live the Queen"	2008	65	—	—	—	—	Love Ire & Song
"Thunder Road"	2009	—	—	—	—	—	Non-album single
"The Road"	2009	62	—	—	—	—	Poetry of the Deed
"Poetry of the Deed"	2009	—	—	—	—	—	Poetry of the Deed
"Isabel"	2010	—	—	—	—	—	Poetry of the Deed
"Try This at Home"	2010	—	—	—	—	—	Poetry of the Deed
"I Still Believe"	2010	40	—	—	—	—	England Keep My Bones
"Peggy Sang the Blues"	2011	—	—	—	—	—	England Keep My Bones
"If Ever I Stray"	2011	200	—	—	—	—	England Keep My Bones
"Wessex Boy"	2011	—	—	—	—	—	England Keep My Bones
"Recovery"	2013	75	—	11	16	1	Tape Deck Heart
"The Way I Tend to Be"	2013	57	60	—	—	8	Tape Deck Heart
"Losing Days"	2013	162	72	—	—	—	Tape Deck Heart
"Oh Brother"	2013	—	—	—	—	—	Tape Deck Heart
"Polaroid Picture"	2014	—	—	—	—	—	Tape Deck Heart
"The Ballad of Me and My Friends"	2014	—	—	—	—	—	The Third Three Years
"Get Better"	2015	—	—	—	—	—	Positive Songs for Negative People
"The Next Storm"	2015	—	—	—	40	10	Positive Songs for Negative People
"Song for Josh"	2015	—	—	—	—	—	Positive Songs for Negative People
"Mittens"	2016	—	—	—	—	—	Positive Songs for Negative People
"Least of All Young Caroline"	2016	—	—	—	—	—	Positive Songs for Negative People
"The Sand in the Gears" (live)	2017	—	—	—	—	—	Non-album single
"There She Is"	2017	—	—	—	—	—	Songbook
"1933"	2018	—	—	—	—	—	Be More Kind
"Blackout"	2018	—	—	—	—	19	Be More Kind
"Sister Rosetta"	2019	—	—	—	—	—	No Man's Land
"Bob"	2020	—	—	—	—	—	West Coast vs. Wessex
"Falling in Love"	2020	—	—	—	—	—	West Coast vs. Wessex
"Bad Times Good Vibes" (with Jon Snodgrass)	2020	—	—	—	—	—	Buddies II: Still Buddies
"Say Anything" (with Nathan Gray)	2020	—	—	—	—	—	Non-album single
"The Fleas" (with Jon Snodgrass)	2020	—	—	—	—	—	Buddies II: Still Buddies
"The Gathering"	2021	—	—	—	—	—	FTHC
"Haven't Been Doing So Well"	2021	—	—	—	—	—	FTHC
"Non Serviam"	2021	—	—	—	—	—	FTHC
"Miranda"	2021	—	—	—	—	—	FTHC
"A Wave Across A Bay"	2022	—	—	—	—	—	FTHC
"The Resurrectionists"	2022	—	—	—	—	—	FTHC
"No Thank You for the Music"	2023	—	—	—	—	—	Undefeated
"Do One"	2024	—	—	—	—	—	Undefeated
"Girl from the Record Shop" (solo or with Teenage Joans)	2024	—	—	—	—	—	Undefeated
"Letters"	2024	—	—	—	—	—	Undefeated
"You're Mine"	2025	—	—	—	—	—	Songs from the Gang
"—" denotes a recording that did not chart or was not released.

== Featured appearances ==
Year	Title	Main artist
2007	"Steve McQueen"	The Automatic
2007	"Deadly Lethal Ninja Assassin"	Reuben
2009	"Larkin About"	Amongst the Pigeons
2010	"You Stay, I Go, No Following"	Look Mexico
2010	"Carnivalesque"	The Dawn Chorus
2012	"Fields of June"	Emily Barker & the Red Clay Halo
2012	"So Long"	Donots
2013	"Рыжий и длинный" ("Ginger and High")	Tarakany!
2014	"Julie"	Levellers
2014	"Home"	John Allen
2016	"Greedy Bones"	Ducking Punches
2019	"Ft. Frank Turner"	The Armed
2019	"Let 'Em Go"	The Wildhearts
2021	"Start Again"	The Lottery Winners

== DVDs ==
Year	Title	Label
2008	All About the Destination	Xtra Mile
2010	Take to the Road	Xtra Mile
2012	Live from Wembley	Xtra Mile
2016	Get Better	TBC
2019	Show 2000	Xtra Mile

== Split releases ==
Year	Title	Other Artist	Label
2006	Xtra Mile Single Sessions #4	Reuben	Xtra Mile
2006	Split	Jonah Matranga	Welcome Home, Xtra Mile
2009	Under the Influence Vol. 8	Austin Lucas	Suburban Home
2009	Frank Turner / Tim Barry Split	Tim Barry	Suburban Home
2010	Long Live the Queen/Still to Keep	Crazy Arm	Xtra Mile
2012	Double Exposure Vol. 1	Franz Nicolay	Asbestos
2012	So Long	The Donots	Universal Music Domestic Rock/Urban
2020	West Coast vs. Wessex	NOFX	Fat Wreck Chords

== Music videos ==
Year	Title	Director
2006	"Cassanova Lament"	
2006	"Vital Signs"	
2006	"The Real Damage"	
2008	"Photosynthesis"	Jon Spira
2008	"Reasons Not to Be an Idiot" (First Version)	
2008	"I Knew Prufrock Before He Got Famous"	Ben Morse
2008	"Long Live the Queen"	Ben Morse
2008	"Reasons Not to Be an Idiot" (Second Version)	Jamie Lenman
2009	"The Road"	Adam Powell
2009	"Poetry of the Deed"	Ben Morse
2009	"Isabel"	Zach Merck
2009	"Try This at Home"	Ben Morse
2010	"I Still Believe"	Ben Morse
2011	"Peggy Sang the Blues"	Scubaboy
2011	"If Ever I Stray"	Alex White
2011	"Wessex Boy"	Ben Morse
2012	"Four Simple Words"	Nick Whiteoak
2013	"Recovery"	Tom Lacey
2013	"The Way I Tend to Be"	James Copeman
2013	"Losing Days"	Ed Lilly
2013	"Oh Brother"	Alex Brown
2013	"Polaroid Picture"	Ben Morse
2015	"The Next Storm"	
2015	"Josephine"	
2016	"Mittens"	
2016	"Love Forty Down"	
2018	"Blackout"	
2018	"Make America Great Again"	
2018	"Little Changes"	
2024	"Do One"	Lukas Rauch
2024	"Do One" (Second Version in German featuring Ingo Knollmann from Donots)	
