= Frank Turner Live from Wembley =

Frank Turner Live From Wembley

Video by Frank Turner
- Released: 3 September 2012
- Recorded: 13 April 2012
- Genre: Folk rock, folk punk
- Label: Xtra Mile Recordings

Frank Turner chronology
| Take to the Road (2010) | Frank Turner Live From Wembley (2012) |

Frank Turner Live From Wembley is a Frank Turner concert video released on 3 September 2012. It was filmed on 13 April 2012 at Wembley Arena and the DVD was released on 3 September 2012. The DVD shows the full concert on the first disc, while the second disc contains two documentaries and the promo videos for Frank's singles off his latest album England Keep My Bones. The disc containing the concert was also included as a bonus disc on the compilation of Last Minutes & Lost Evenings, as well as the re-release of England Keep My Bones.

== Documentaries ==
The first documentary on the DVD is by Gregoey Nolan and it documents the journey of Frank and The Sleeping Souls on their "Road to Wembley". This documentary also features footage shot and sent in by fans from around the world as they too made their way to Wembley for the show.

== Disc 1 ==
1. "Eulogy"
2. "Try This at Home"
3. "If Ever I Stray"
4. "Reasons Not to Be an Idiot"
5. "Nashville Tennessee"
6. "Wessex Boy" (with Emily Barker & The Red Clay Halo)
7. "Peggy Sang the Blues" (with Emily Barker & The Red Clay Halo)
8. "I Am Disappeared"
9. "Love Ire & Song"
10. "Glory Hallelujah"
11. "The Real Damage"
12. "Dan's Song" (Frank's mother played harmonica)
13. "Father's Day"
14. "Substitute"
15. "Long Live the Queen" (with Emily Barker & The Red Clay Halo)
16. "I Knew Prufrock Before He Got Famous" (with Emily Barker & The Red Clay Halo)
17. "Sons of Liberty"
18. "Four Simple Words" (New Song)
19. "The Road"
20. "I Still Believe"
21. "Somebody to Love" (Queen cover)
22. "The Times They Are A-Changin'" (Bob Dylan cover with Billy Bragg)
23. "The Ballad of Me and My Friends"
24. "Photosynthesis"

== Disc 2 ==
1. I Still Believe (The Road To Wembley) documentary by Greg Nolan
2. Beans On Toast’s Road To Wembley – a film by Frank Turner
3. "Peggy Sang The Blues" (Music Video)
4. "I Still Believe" (Music Video)
5. "Wessex Boy" (Music Video)
6. "If Ever I Stray" (Music Video)
7. "Sailor’s Boots" (Music Video)

== Personnel ==
- Frank Turner – lead vocals, acoustic guitar

=== The Sleeping Souls ===
- Ben Lloyd – electric guitar, mandolin, vocals
- Tarrant Anderson – bass guitar, vocals
- Matt Nasir – piano, organ, keyboards, string arrangements, vocals
- Nigel Powell – drums, percussion, mandolin, vocals

=== Special guests ===
- Frank's Mother - harmonica on "Dan's Song"
- Emily Barker - Backing vocals on "Wessex Boy", "Peggy Sang the Blues", "Long Live the Queen" & "I Knew Prufrock Before He Got Famous", harmonica on "I Still Believe"
- The Red Clay Halo - Backing vocals on "Wessex Boy", "Peggy Sang the Blues", "Long Live the Queen" & "I Knew Prufrock Before He Got Famous"
- Billy Bragg - guitar and vocals on "The Times They Are a-Changin'"

=== Filmed by ===
- Sea Legs
- Jack Lilley Director/editor/producer
