= Dive Dive =

British rock band

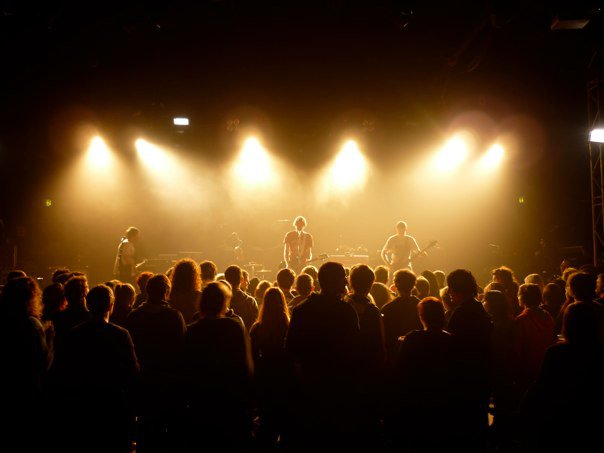
- Dive Dive performing in Preston, England in December 2010

Background information
- Origin: Oxford, England
- Genres: Rock
- Years active: 2001–present
- Label: Xtra Mile
- Members: Jamie Stuart - Guitar; vocals Ben Lloyd - Guitar; vocals Tarrant Anderson - Bass guitar Nigel Powell - Drums; vocals
- Website: Dive Dive

Dive Dive are a British rock band, composed of Jamie Stuart (guitar and vocals), Ben Lloyd (guitar and vocals), Nigel Powell (drums and vocals) and Tarrant Anderson (bass guitar). Ben Lloyd and Tarrant Anderson also play as full-time members of Frank Turner's band, The Sleeping Souls.

Dive Dive formed in 2001 in Oxford, England after the breakup of the members' previous bands, Unbelievable Truth (Nigel Powell) and Dustball (Jamie Stuart and Tarrant Anderson), in 2000. The band were championed from early on by John Peel, for whom they recorded a number of sessions at the BBC Maida Vale Studios and also performed live on his BBC Radio 1 show.

== Biography ==
=== Debut album ===
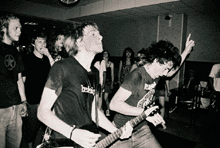
Dive Dive performing in 2005

Dive Dive's first release was "The Crock" (an instrumental track that often closed their concerts up to 2007). This appeared in 2002 on a joint EP, "When I Wank On My Guitar The Whole World Wanks With Me", on the Oxford-based independent record label, Juggernaught Records. Other bands on the EP were The Rock Of Travolta, Six Ray Sun and South Sea Company Prospectus. "The Crock" was followed a few months later by a four track EP, "Sounds All Wrong", also on Juggernaught Records. In 2003, Dive Dive released "Name & Number" as a 7" single on Oxford indie label Vacuous Pop Records, which garnered national press attention for the band for the first time, including single of the week in The Independent. "Name & Number" was followed by the release of a single, "Good Show" on Idle Records in early 2004, which again attracted positive reviews, including another single of the week in The Independent. By 2004 the band's developing reputation as an outstanding live act led to an album deal with London-based independent label, Diablo Records. Diablo released Dive Dive's debut album, Tilting At Windmills, in June 2005, along with three supporting radio singles "Good Show", (rereleased) "555 For Filmstars" and "The Sorry Suitor". "555 For Filmstars" and "The Sorry Suitor" both received a moderate amount of national and regional radio play, and entered the UK Indie Chart at #6 and #10 respectively. The band were joined on stage by Ride's Loz Colbert and Radiohead's Philip Selway during the tour to promote the album.

=== Backing Frank Turner ===
In 2006 Lloyd, Powell and Anderson recorded as Frank Turner's studio band for his first solo release "Campfire Punkrock". The record was recorded in Dive Dive's studio in the basement of bassist Tarrant Anderson's Oxford home, and released on Xtra Mile Recordings in September 2006. In January 2007, Dive Dive appeared as Frank Turner's backing band on his first full band tour of the UK. On subsequent Frank Turner tours, Stuart dropped out of the line up due to other commitments, however until late 2020, Lloyd, Powell and Anderson still made up three quarters of his backing band. Lloyd and Powell contributed to Frank Turner's first two albums (Sleep Is For The Week and Love, Ire and Song), Lloyd as record producer and guitarist and Powell as drummer and keyboardist. Tarrant was present as bassist for all full band touring, and contributed as a recording musician to 2009's Poetry of the Deed album.

=== Second album ===
Dive Dive's second album, Revenge of the Mechanical Dog, was recorded during 2007 in gaps between touring as Turner's live band. It was released on the band's own label, Land Speed Records, in conjunction with the Oxford indie label Truck Records and Pinnacle Distribution.

=== Third album ===
Lloyd, Powell and Anderson's commitments in Turner's band have meant Dive Dive live shows have been sparse since 2007, however the band recorded their third album, Potential, in 2010 and this was released on Xtra Mile Recordings on 17 January 2011, preceded by single "Liar" on 13 December 2010.

== Discography ==
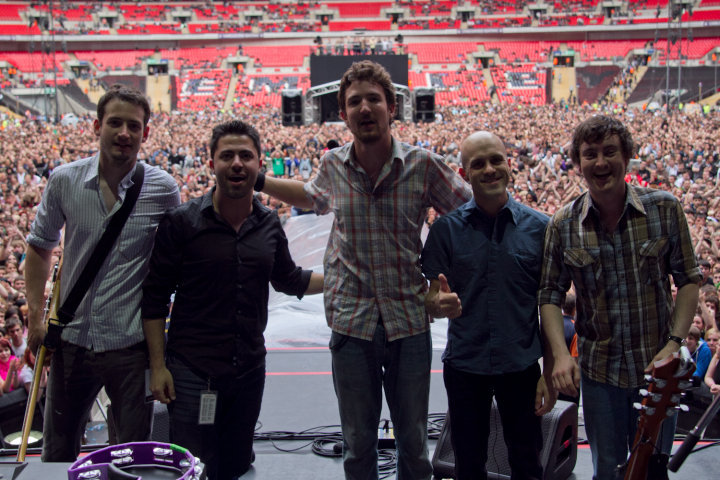
Nigel Powell, Ben Lloyd and Tarrant Anderson on stage with Frank Turner and Turner's keyboard player, Matt Nasir, at Wembley Stadium, June 2010

=== Studio albums ===
- Tilting at Windmills (2005)
- Revenge of the Mechanical Dog (2007)
- Potential (2011)
- The Waves Behind (2019)

=== EPs ===
- Liar (2010)

=== Singles ===
- "Good Show" (2004)
- "555 for Film Stars" UK Indie No. 6, UK Chart No. 48 (2005)
- "The Sorry Suitor" UK Indie No. 10, UK Chart No. 54 (2005)
- "The Game" (2007)
