= Back to Sleep =

Back to Sleep may refer to:

- "Back to Sleep" (song), a 2015 song by Chris Brown
- Safe to Sleep public health campaign, formerly known as Back to Sleep
- "Back to Sleep", a song on the 2007 EP The Real Damage by Frank Turner
- "Back to Sleep", a song on the 2012 eponymous album Goliath and the Giants
