= FTHC =

Studio album by Frank Turner
- Released: 11 February 2022
- Studio: ARC, Oxford; WAYout Arts, Sierra Leone; Dock Street Studios, London
- Length: 42:31
- Label: Xtra Mile; Polydor
- Producer: Rich Costey

Frank Turner chronology
West Coast vs. Wessex (2020)	FTHC (2022)	Undefeated (2024)

Singles from FTHC
- 1. "The Gathering" Released: 6 May 2021; 2. "Haven't Been Doing So Well" Released: 16 September 2021; 3. "Non Serviam" Released: 29 October 2021; 4. "Miranda" Released: 26 November 2021; 5. "A Wave Across a Bay" Released: 12 January 2022; 6. "The Resurrectionists" Released: 4 February 2022

FTHC (initialism for Frank Turner Hardcore) is the ninth studio album by English singer-songwriter Frank Turner, released on 11 February 2022.

== Background and production ==
After tour plans for the rest of 2020 were cut short due to the COVID-19 pandemic and the ensuing lockdown measures, Turner engaged in a weekly series of acoustic livestreams from his home which he called "Independent Venue Love", the goal of which was to raise money for grassroots venues that were struggling due to the lack of patronage caused by the pandemic and lockdown. During these streams, he began performing new material alongside his previously released back catalogue. Among these was "The Gathering", a track about longing for the return of live music that would later go on to be released as the album's lead single in May 2021.

Turner continued to debut new material during the livestreams and as UK restrictions began to relax in the summer of 2020, he entered the Abbey Recording Studio in Oxford and began recording FTHC with Rich Costey, who handled production and mixing duties remotely. Drummer Nigel Powell's departure from Turner's backing band The Sleeping Souls in October 2020 led to him utilising guest musicians on the drums, with Muse drummer Dominic Howard featuring on "The Gathering", alongside a guitar solo from Jason Isbell. The vast majority of the drumming on the rest of the album was handled by Ilan Rubin of Nine Inch Nails and Angels & Airwaves, while Death Cab for Cutie drummer Jason McGerr and Kevin Fennell of Guided by Voices feature on "A Wave Across a Bay" and "Little Life" respectively.

Upon announcing the album, Turner said that after Be More Kind's foray into "electronic music" and the "history folk" stylings of No Man's Land, he wanted to "restate his purpose as an artist" and "blow the cobwebs away". He described the album as a more "direct and raw" and "sonically aggressive" exploration of his personal issues that was "built [to be played] live."

Following its release as a single in November 2021, Turner revealed the origins of the song "Miranda", which tells the story of how his father had transitioned and was now living as a transgender woman. The track's lyrics discuss his and Miranda's previously tumultuous relationship and how they began to reconcile following her transition, with Turner stating in an interview with The Guardian that "Miranda is a really nice person – my dad wasn't."

== Release and promotion ==
"The Gathering" was released as the record's lead single on 6 May 2021 and coincided with the announcement of a run of summer shows between June and September 2021 known as "The Gathering: Summer 2021". The record's second single "Haven't Been Doing So Well" was released on 16 September 2021, alongside the announcement of the album and its track listing.

The album's opening track, "Non Serviam", was released as the record's third single on 29 October 2021, with "Miranda" following as the album's fourth single on 26 November 2021. A fifth single, "A Wave Across a Bay", a tribute to his friend Scott Hutchison from the band Frightened Rabbit, was released on 12 January 2022. A final single, "The Resurrectionists", was released a week before the album on 4 February 2022.

FTHC was released on 11 February 2022

=== Tour ===
A tour of the UK in support of the record named "The Never Ending Tour of Everywhere" was announced, originally scheduled to begin in January 2022. However, rising COVID-19 cases in the UK following the emergence of the Omicron variant lead to the UK and Scotland dates of the tour being delayed until September and October 2022 over health concerns for the crew and audience, with the tour instead beginning in Belfast on 8 April 2022.

Turner then embarked on a series of intimate acoustic album launch shows throughout the UK between March and April 2022, followed by a tour of the United States in support of the album entitled "50 States in 50 Days" with The Sleeping Souls between June and August 2022. On 13 October 2022, The tour was extended into 2023, with a second leg of UK dates in January and February, followed by the announcement of a third leg of European shows and festival appearances throughout the summer.

== Track listing ==
All tracks are written by Frank Turner, except where noted.

FTHC – Standard edition
No.	Title	Writer(s)	Length
1.	"Non Serviam"		1:59
2.	"The Gathering"		2:39
3.	"Haven't Been Doing So Well"		3:16
4.	"Untainted Love"		2:54
5.	"Fatherless"	Frank Turner; Matt Nasir	2:41
6.	"My Bad"		1:44
7.	"Miranda"		4:00
8.	"A Wave Across a Bay"		3:43
9.	"The Resurrectionists"	Turner; Nasir	2:42
10.	"Punches"		3:03
11.	"Perfect Score"		2:30
12.	"The Work"		3:32
13.	"Little Life"		3:35
14.	"Farewell to My City"		4:13
Total length:			42:31

FTHC – Deluxe edition bonus tracks
No.	Title	Length
15.	"The Zeitbeast"	3:58
16.	"The House Where I Was Raised"	3:57
17.	"Haven't Been Doing So Well" (acoustic)	3:17
18.	"A Wave Across a Bay" (acoustic)	3:49
19.	"Punches" (acoustic)	2:58
20.	"The Work" (acoustic)	4:11
Total length:		64:41

== Personnel ==
Credits adapted from liner notes

Frank Turner & the Sleeping Souls

- Frank Turner – lead vocals, acoustic guitar, electric guitar
- Ben Lloyd – electric guitar, backing vocals
- Tarrant Anderson – bass guitar, backing vocals
- Matt Nasir – piano, keyboards, organ, backing vocals

Additional musicians

- Ilan Rubin – drums (tracks 1, 3–7, 9–12, 14)
- Dominic Howard – drums (track 2)
- Jason Isbell – electric guitar (track 2)
- Jason McGerr – drums (track 8)
- Kevin Fennell – drums (track 13)
- Rich Costey – electric guitar, programming, percussion (track 2)
- Koby Berman – additional synths, falsetto vocals (track 2)
- Simon Neil – additional vocals (track 9)
- WAYout Arts Crew – percussion (track 10)

Production

- Rich Costey – production, mixing
- Frank Arkwright – mastering
- Koby Berman – additional production (track 2)
- Adam 'Cecil' Bartlett – engineering
- Matt Taylor – additional engineering

Additional personnel

- Matt Nasir – photography
- JSH creates – No Fear font
- Thomas Lacey – layout

== Charts ==
Chart performance for FTHC
Chart (2022)	Peak position
German Albums (Offizielle Top 100)	9
Scottish Albums (OCC)	1
Swiss Albums (Schweizer Hitparade)	84
UK Albums (OCC)	1
