= West Coast vs. Wessex =

Studio album (split album) by NOFX and Frank Turner
- Released: July 31, 2020
- Genres: Punk rock, Folk punk, Skate punk, Reggae punk
- Length: 29:50
- Label: Fat Wreck Chords
- Producers: D-Composers: John Carey, Yotam Ben Horin, Baz Bastien & Fat Mike) - (tracks 1-5)

NOFX chronology
Ribbed: Live in a Dive (2018)	West Coast vs. Wessex (2020)	Single Album (2021)

Frank Turner chronology
No Man's Land (2019)	West Coast vs. Wessex (2020)	FTHC (2022)

Singles from West Coast Vs Wessex
- 1. "Thatcher Fucked The Kids" Released: 1 June 2020

Professional ratings
Review scores
Source	Rating
Exclaim!	8/10 stars
Maximum Volume Music	8/10 stars
Hysteria Magazine	8/10 stars
Wall of Sound	7.5/10 stars
Louder Than War	7/10 stars
Metal.de	7/10 stars
New Noise Magazine	4/5 stars
Punknews.org	3.5/5 stars
Kerrang!	3/5 stars
Brokenheadphones.com	(positive)

West Coast vs. Wessex is a split album by the American punk rock band NOFX and the British folk punk artist Frank Turner. The split was released on July 31, 2020, by Fat Wreck Chords and it features covers of each other's songs, five by NOFX and five by Frank Turner.

== Release ==
The collaboration and its title, cover art and the track listing was first publicly announced on June 1, 2020. Two songs of the album were made available for digital streaming, namely "Thatcher Fucked the Kids" by NOFX (originally by Frank Turner) and "Bob" by Frank Turner (originally by NOFX). Two accompanying music videos were also released. "Falling in Love" was made available for streaming at the end of the month, on June 29. The entire album was made available for streaming on July 30. West Coast vs. Wessex was officially released by Fat Wreck Chords on July 31.

West Coast vs. Wessex is the final Frank Turner release to feature longtime drummer Nigel Powell.

== Background ==
The title of West Coast vs. Wessex respectively refers to the West Coast of the United States, where NOFX is from, and to Wessex, a region in the deep south of England where Frank Turner is from.

Frank Turner and NOFX's front man Fat Mike had already discussed the possibility of recording a split album over the course of previous years, including the approach they would take. On West Coast vs. Wessex both acts aimed to interpret each other's songs differently than they were originally performed. When the two decided to actually record the split album, they also decided not to discuss the collaboration with each other, so Frank Turner wouldn't have any input in NOFX's covers and vice versa. According to Frank Turner:

“[T]here’s no point in doing a straight cover song. You might as well just listen to the original. So with that in mind, we didn’t really discuss the philosophy of this very much till it was just like, “Do you want to do it?” And I think we both understood that we would come at it in a serious way.”

— Frank Turner

About the choice of the songs, Frank Turner noted that he picked the NOFX songs he thought he could play differently, noting that he also picked some lesser-known NOFX songs.

“I wanted to try and pick songs where I felt like me and my band could bring something different to the table. [...] But it did strike me that it would be cool to demonstrate to the casual NOFX fan, who doesn't know who I am, that I am actually a fan. I didn't just go to Spotify and pick the five most-listened-to songs.”

— Frank Turner

Fat Mike admitted taking a similar approach. Fat Mike also noted that since Frank Turner only chose to cover NOFX songs from the '90s, he would also cover some of Frank Turner's earlier work.

“I listened to all his records, and I picked the ones that I thought I could make more interesting. [...] What I did is change a lot of chords. Frank, he beats me in the singing department. So I can't sing better than he can, but I can maybe throw in a melody here or there or chord that he hadn’t thought of.”

— Fat Mike

While "Perfect Government"' is a song mostly associated with NOFX, it was actually written by Mark Curry, a friend of the band who played a crucial role for El Hefe to join NOFX.

== Track listing ==
1. "Substitute" (NOFX) - 2:45
2. "Worse Things Happen at Sea" (NOFX) - 3:19
3. "Thatcher Fucked the Kids" (NOFX) - 3:07
4. "Ballad of Me and My Friends" (NOFX) - 1:50
5. "Glory Hallelujah" (NOFX) - 3:27
6. "Scavenger Type" (Frank Turner) - 1:43
7. "Bob" (Frank Turner) - 3:08
8. "Eat the Meek" (Frank Turner) - 3:57
9. "Perfect Government" (Frank Turner) - 2:26
10. "Falling in Love" (Frank Turner) - 4:08

== Personnel ==
=== Performers ===
NOFX

- Fat Mike - vocals, bass
- El Hefe - guitar, vocals
- Eric Melvin - guitar, vocals
- Erik Sandin - drums
- John Carey - backup vocals & guitar & recording & arranging

Frank Turner & The Sleeping Souls

- Frank Turner - vocals, guitar
- Ben Lloyd - guitar, vocals
- Tarrant Anderson - bass
- Matt Nasir - piano, keyboards, vocals
- Nigel Powell - drums, percussion, vocals

Additional performers

- Tim Brennan - accordion (track 10)

=== Production ===
- Chris Hesse - mixing (tracks 1–5), mastering
- Tristan Ivemy - mixing (tracks 6–10)
- D-Composers (John Carey, Yotam Ben Horin, Baz Bastien & Fat Mike) - production (tracks 1–5)
