= Möngöl Hörde (album) =

Studio album by Möngöl Hörde
- Released: 26 May 2014
- Studio: Middle Farm (Devon); Amazing Grace
- Genre: Hardcore punk; post-hardcore
- Length: 35:29
- Label: Xtra Mile
- Producer: Derya Nagle

Möngöl Hörde is the self-titled debut album by British hardcore punk band Möngöl Hörde (now known as Mïngle Härde), released in 2014 through Xtra Mile Recordings. It was retitled Mingle Harde when a 10th anniversary edition featuring the bonus tracks "Selfiestixamitosis", "Godfrey Newman" and "Taxi for the Horde" was released on 24 May 2024, replacing the original Möngöl Hörde album as the band was renamed following controversy following offense being taken to the name.

== Music videos ==
Music videos were made for the tracks "Casual Threats from Weekend Hardmen", "How the Communists Ruined Christmas", and "Tapeworm Uprising".

== Track listing ==
No.	Title	Length
1.	"Make Way"	2:45
2.	"Weighed and Found Wanting"	1:57
3.	"Tapeworm Uprising"	3:10
4.	"Casual Threats from Weekend Hardmen"	2:00
5.	"Staff to Refund Counter"	3:16
6.	"The Yurt Locker"	1:09
7.	"Stillborn Unicorn"	3:52
8.	"WinkyFace: The Mark of a Moron"	1:03
9.	"Weak Handshake"	3:14
10.	"Your Problem"	2:47
11.	"How the Communists Ruined Christmas"	2:37
12.	"Blistering Blue Barnacles"	3:47
13.	"Hey Judas"	3:46
Total length:		35:29

== Personnel ==
=== Mïngle Härde ===
- Frank Turner – vocals
- Matt Nasir – guitar
- Ben Dawson – drums

=== Production ===
- Derya Nagle – production, mixing
- Peter Miles – engineering
- Jay Malhondra – engineering
- Denis Blackham – mastering

=== Additional personnel ===
- Joaquin Ardiles – artwork
- Ben Morse – photography

== Charts ==
Chart performance for Möngöl Hörde
Chart (2014)	Peak position
UK Albums (OCC)	100
UK Independent Albums (OCC)	12
UK Rock & Metal Albums (OCC)	3
