= Undefeated (Frank Turner album) =

Studio album by Frank Turner
- Released: 3 May 2024
- Recorded: 2023
- Studio: No Mersea (Essex); SS2 (Southend-on-Sea); B-Note (Bern)
- Length: 45:31
- Label: Xtra Mile
- Producer: Frank Turner

Frank Turner chronology
FTHC (2022)	Undefeated (2024)

Singles from Undefeated
- 1. "No Thank You for the Music" Released: 28 December 2023; 2. "Do One" Released: 25 January 2024; 3. "Girl from the Record Shop" Released: 23 February 2024; 4. "Letters" Released: 27 March 2024

Undefeated is the tenth studio album by English singer-songwriter Frank Turner. It was released on 3 May 2024 through Xtra Mile Recordings.

== Background ==
Turner wrote, recorded and produced Undefeated in his home studio on Mersea Island, backed by his long-time band The Sleeping Souls: Ben Lloyd (guitar), Tarrant Anderson (bass), Callum Green (drums) and Matt Nasir (piano). It is also the first album of his without a big label involved in over a decade. The artist refers to the album as his "first back home with a global independent label setup" and celebrates the freedom of working as an "independent artist".

In a statement, Turner explained that there are "no clichés" about the album, which might be "liberating" to him but at the same time feels like having a "duty to justify writing and releasing" a tenth album. Undefeated was inspired by long-time influences, including Black Flag, Counting Crows, Descendents, The Pogues, Elvis Costello, and Billy Bragg.

== Track listing ==
All tracks are written by Frank Turner; "Letters", "No Thank You for the Music", and "On My Way" written with Matt Nasir.

Undefeated track listing
No.	Title	Length
1.	"Do One"	2:21
2.	"Nevermind the Back Problems"	1:27
3.	"Ceasefire"	5:06
4.	"Girl from the Record Shop"	1:46
5.	"Pandemic PTSD"	3:14
6.	"Letters"	3:13
7.	"East Finchley"	4:32
8.	"No Thank You for the Music"	3:49
9.	"The Leaders"	1:27
10.	"International Hide and Seek Champions"	2:25
11.	"Show People"	3:43
12.	"On My Way"	3:16
13.	"Somewhere Inbetween"	4:47
14.	"Undefeated"	4:25
Total length:		45:31

== Personnel ==
Frank Turner and the Sleeping Souls

- Frank Turner – vocals, guitars, production, arrangement
- Ben Lloyd – guitar, harmonica, vocals, arrangement
- Tarrant Anderson – bass, vocals
- Matt Nasir – piano, keyboards, mandolin, string and horn arrangements, vocals, arrangement
- Callum Green – drums, percussion, vocals, arrangement

Additional musicians

- Pete Fraser – saxophone
- Sam Ewens – flugelhorn, French horn, trumpet
- George Shilling – cello
- Anna Jenkins – violin, viola
- Dougie Murphy – backing vocals
- Tre Stead – backing vocals
- Cahir O'Doherty – backing vocals
- Conor Mullan – backing vocals
- Johnny Stephenson – backing vocals
- Kris Lundberg – backing vocals
- Steve Brown – backing vocals

Technical

- Frank Arkwright – mastering
- Tristan Ivemy – mixing
- Samhain Carter-Brazier – mixing
- Cecil Bartlett – engineering
- Sam Duckworth – piano engineering
- Jay Malhotra – piano engineering
- Nicolas Müller – backing vocal engineering

Visuals

- Dougie Murphy – cover photo
- Phil D'Auria – tintype photos
- Craigy Lee – tattoo artist
- OneThirtyEight Ltd. – layout

== Charts ==
Chart performance for Undefeated
Chart (2024)	Peak position
Austrian Albums (Ö3 Austria)	68
Belgian Albums (Ultratop Flanders)	193
German Albums (Offizielle Top 100)	6
Scottish Albums (OCC)	3
UK Albums (OCC)	3
UK Independent Albums (OCC)	1
