= Sons of Liberty (disambiguation) =

The Sons of Liberty were a secret organization of patriots during the colonial period in the United States.

Sons of Liberty may also refer to:

== Organizations ==
- Société des Fils de la Liberté (Society of the Sons of Liberty), secret revolutionary organization involved in the Lower Canada Rebellion of 1837–1838
- Knights of the Golden Circle, reorganized in 1865 as the Order of the Sons of Liberty

== In film and television ==
- Sons of Liberty (film), a 1939 Academy Award-winning film
- Sons of Liberty (miniseries), a three-part mini-series airing on the History Channel

== In video games ==
- Metal Gear Solid 2: Sons of Liberty, a 2001 Japanese video game

== In music ==
- Sons of Liberty (band), a solo musical side project of heavy metal musician Jon Schaffer, of the progressive thrash metal band Iced Earth
- "Sons of Liberty", a Frank Turner song from his 2009 album Poetry of the Deed

== See also ==
- Sons of Freedom (disambiguation)
