= Matt Lawrence (producer) =

British music engineer and producer

Matt Lawrence is a British Grammy Award-winning engineer, record producer and mixer.

In 2011 Lawrence was nominated for Recording Engineer of the year at The Music Producers Guild Awards.

The following year Lawrence won a Grammy for his work on Mumford & Sons Babel album, which debuted at number one in both the UK Albums Chart and the US Billboard 200, becoming the fastest-selling album of the year.

Lawrence has worked with a vast array of UK and international artists, including: Adele, Amy Winehouse, Bat For Lashes, Beyoncé, Black Eyed Peas, Bjork, Ellie Goulding, Emeli Sande, Eric Clapton, Foals, George Ezra, George Michael, Groove Armada, Frank Turner, Interpol, Keane, Kylie, Kodaline, Lady Gaga, Jeff Beck, Joan Armatrading, Laura Marling, Macy Gray, Magnetic Man, Naughty Boy, One Direction, Paloma Faith, Scissor Sisters, Slaves, Shirley Bassey, Sugababes, Tom Walker, The Clash, The Rolling Stones, The White Stripes, The Who, The Vaccines, U2, Van Morrison, You Me At Six.
