= Be More Kind =

Studio album by Frank Turner
- Released: 4 May 2018
- Recorded: 2017
- Studio: Niles City Sound Studios, Fort Worth, Texas; East West Studios, Los Angeles; Livingston Studios, London
- Genre: Indie rock; indie folk
- Length: 48:27
- Label: Xtra Mile; Polydor
- Producer: Austin Jenkins; Joshua Blocks; Charlie Hugall; Chris Vivion

Frank Turner chronology
Positive Songs for Negative People (2015)	Be More Kind (2018)	No Man's Land (2019)

Singles from Be More Kind
- 1. "1933" Released: 28 January 2018; 2. "Be More Kind" Released: 23 February 2018; 3. "Blackout" Released: 16 March 2018; 4. "Make America Great Again" Released: 9 April 2018; 5. "Little Changes" Released: 30 April 2018

Be More Kind is the seventh studio album by English singer-songwriter Frank Turner, released on 4 May 2018 by Xtra Mile Recordings. This is the final album to feature Nigel Powell on drums.

== Background ==
Frank Turner released his sixth studio album Positive Songs for Negative People on 7 August 2015, via Xtra Mile Recordings. Later that year, on 20 November 2015, Turner released a vinyl box set titled The First Ten Years, containing three previously released compilation albums – The First Three Years, The Second Three Years, and The Third Three Years – as well as a new compilation titled Ten for Ten. To promote both releases, Turner embarked on an extensive European and North American tour, with support from Northcote and various other artists.

In a December 2016 interview with Upset Magazine, Turner revealed that he argued with his record label during the creation of Positive Songs For Negative People, believing that he was "in a position where my artistic integrity was on the line". He also told the magazine that he believed the album was "emptying out one particular creative cupboard", and that he was "in the middle of trying to decide precisely which direction I want to head in next". On 22 January 2017, Turner released a live recording of "The Sand in the Gears", originally performed during his US tour. Later that year, on 24 November, Turner released Songbook, a compilation album featuring his personal favorite tracks, alternative recordings of previous releases, and one new song. He also announced that his next studio album would be released in 2018.

== Composition ==
Its title is based on a line from a Clive James poem first published in the 3 June 2013 issue of The New Yorker in which he describes his own mortality called "Leçons des Ténèbres". The line which inspired the title reads: "I should have been more kind. It is my fate. To find this out, but find it out too late."

The album has been described as "a record that combines universal anthems with raw emotion and the political and the personal, with the intricate folk and punk roar trademarks of Turner's sound imbued with new, bold experimental shades."

It was produced by Austin Jenkins and Joshua Block, formerly of psychedelic-rock Texans White Denim, and Florence and the Machine and Halsey collaborator Charlie Hugall.

The artwork for the album, including one illustration for each song, was done by Ben Rix. Rix also invited people to submit their own artwork to add to the process online.

== Release and promotion ==
=== Singles and music videos ===
Frank Turner announced the details of his then-upcoming album, including the title, track listing, and release date, on 29 January 2018. As part of the album announcement, the first single from Be More Kind, "1933", was made available for streaming the same day. Nearly one month later, on 23 February 2018, Turner released the second single from the album, the title track "Be More Kind". Turner released the third single, "Blackout", on 16 March 2018. The accompanying music video, released the same day, was filmed on the George Lucas stage at Elstree Studios, the same studio used for filming Star Wars and Raiders of the Lost Ark.

On 9 April 2018, Turner released a music video for the fourth single on Be More Kind, "Make America Great Again". In the video, Turner travels around Austin, Texas, asking residents what, in their opinion, is the greatest thing about the United States. The last single to be unveiled before the album's release was "Little Changes", which was serviced to radio stations on 30 April 2018. The music video for "Little Changes" was released on 4 May, the same day as Be More Kind. It depicted Turner attempting to dance alongside two other men.

=== Tour and live performances ===
As part of the 29 January album announcement, Turner also unveiled the details of the "Be More Kind World Tour", which ran from May to October 2018 in North America. Turner was accompanied by his backing band, the Sleeping Souls, and was supported on the tour by Lucero, The Menzingers, and The Homeless Gospel Choir. On 23 April, he added seven tour dates in the United Kingdom, performed in January and February 2019. As part of the tour announcement, Turner also announced an exclusive tour edition of Be More Kind, featuring alternative cover art and a fold-out tour poster.

== Music videos ==
- "1933"
- "Be More Kind"
- "Blackout"
- "Make America Great Again"
- "Little Changes"

== Critical reception ==
Professional ratings
Aggregate scores
Source	Rating
AnyDecentMusic?	7.6/10
Metacritic	81/100
Review scores
Source	Rating
AllMusic	4/5 stars
Clash	6/10
Drowned in Sound	8/10
The Independent	4/5 stars
musicOMH	3.5/5 stars
NME	4/5 stars
PopMatters	8/10
Punknews.org	3.5/5 stars
Under the Radar	7/10 stars

Be More Kind was met with mostly positive reviews from music critics. At Metacritic, which assigns a normalized rating out of 100 to reviews from mainstream critics, Be More Kind has an average score of 81 based on 11 reviews. The review aggregator AnyDecentMusic? gave the album 7.6 out of 10, based on their assessment of the critical consensus.

In its year-end list of the best 25 albums of 2018, Radio X placed Be More Kind at #7.

== Track listing ==
All tracks are written by Frank Turner, except 1, 3, 7, 10 by Frank Turner & Iain Archer.

No.	Title	Length
1.	"Don't Worry"	3:13
2.	"1933"	3:07
3.	"Little Changes"	3:26
4.	"Be More Kind"	4:06
5.	"Make America Great Again"	3:28
6.	"Going Nowhere"	3:59
7.	"Brave Face"	3:36
8.	"There She Is"	3:48
9.	"21st Century Survival Blues"	3:58
10.	"Blackout"	3:56
11.	"Common Ground"	4:14
12.	"The Lifeboat"	4:10
13.	"Get It Right"	3:26
Total length:		48:27

== Personnel ==
Credits adapted from the Be More Kind liner notes.

Frank Turner & the Sleeping Souls

- Frank Turner – lead vocals, acoustic guitar, electric guitar
- Ben Lloyd – electric guitar, mandolin, backing vocals
- Tarrant Anderson – bass guitar, upright bass, backing vocals
- Matt Nasir – piano, keyboards, organ, synthesizer, string arrangements, backing vocals
- Nigel Powell – drums, percussion, programming, backing vocals

Additional musicians

- Njia Martin – backing vocals (tracks 1, 3, 7)
- Brandon Mills – backing vocals (tracks 1, 3, 7)
- Bonnie Bishop – backing vocals (tracks 1, 3, 7)
- Abraham Ademola – backing vocals (tracks 1, 3, 7)
- Philippa Ashdown – backing vocals (track 11)
- Austin Jenkins – backing vocals (track 13)
- Veronica Gan – violin (tracks 4, 8, 12)
- Anna Jenkins – violin (tracks 1, 3)
- Buffi Jacobs – cello (tracks 4, 8, 12)
- Jo Silverston – cello (tracks 1, 3)
- Russell Echols – trumpet (track 3)
- Clay Pritchard – saxophone (track 3)
- Justin Barbee – trumpet (track 12)
- Bill Churchville – trumpet (track 8)
- John Mason – French horn (track 8)
- Fred Greene – tuba (track 8)
- Chris Tedesco – conductor

Production

- Austin Jenkins – production, musical arrangement
- Joshua Block – production, engineering
- Chris Vivion – production, engineering
- Charlie Hugall – mixing, production
- Matt Lawrence – mixing
- Brendon Dekora – engineering
- Frank Arkwright – mastering
- Ben Rix – art and design

== Charts ==
Chart performance for Be More Kind
Chart (2018)	Peak position
Austrian Albums (Ö3 Austria)	19
Canadian Albums (Billboard)	87
German Albums (Offizielle Top 100)	12
Irish Albums (IRMA)	55
New Zealand Heatseeker Albums (RMNZ)	8
Scottish Albums (OCC)	2
Swiss Albums (Schweizer Hitparade)	25
UK Albums (OCC)	3
US Billboard 200	95
US Americana/Folk Albums (Billboard)	5
US Vinyl Albums (Billboard)	21
US Top Album Sales (Billboard)	18
US Top Alternative Albums (Billboard)	8
US Top Rock Albums (Billboard)	15
US Indie Store Album Sales (Billboard)	12
