= The First Three Years =

Compilation album by Frank Turner
- Released: 1 December 2008
- Recorded: 2005–2008
- Genre: Folk rock
- Length: 78:18
- Label: Xtra Mile
- Producers: Martin Price and George Elliott

Frank Turner chronology
Love Ire & Song (2008)	The First Three Years (2008)	Poetry of the Deed (2009)

Professional ratings
Review scores
Source	Rating
Kerrang!	4/5 stars
Stereokill.net	4.5/5 stars

The First Three Years is a compilation album by singer-songwriter Frank Turner, released 1 December 2008 through Xtra Mile Recordings. The compilation is also included on the re-release of Love Ire & Song, released 26 January 2009. The album itself is only available directly from Xtra Mile.

The album compiles material that does not appear on either of Turner's first two studio albums, including tracks from early EPs, split singles, covers and unreleased material. The collection also includes a cover of "Smiling at Strangers on Trains" – Turner's former band, Million Dead's, first single.

The title and cover artwork reference the Black Flag album The First Four Years, a similar compilation of early material.

== Track listing ==
All tracks are written by Frank Turner except where noted.

No.	Title	Originally appeared on	Length
1.	"The Real Damage"	Xtra Mile Single Sessions Vol. #4	3:25
2.	"Nashville Tennessee"	Campfire Punkrock	3:42
3.	"Thatcher Fucked the Kids"	Campfire Punkrock	3:19
4.	"This Town Ain't Big Enough for the One of Me"	Campfire Punkrock	3:05
5.	"Casanova Lament"	Campfire Punkrock	2:12
6.	"I Really Don't Care What You Did On Your Gap Year"	Campfire Punkrock	5:05
7.	"The Outdoor Type" ((The Lemonheads/Smudge) cover)	Jonah Matranga / Frank Turner Split	2:18
8.	"You Are My Sunshine" (Jimmie Davis cover)	Jonah Matranga / Frank Turner Split	4:21
9.	"Sea Legs"	The Real Damage	3:36
10.	"Back to Sleep"	The Real Damage	3:44
11.	"Sunshine State"	The Real Damage	3:05
12.	"Heartless Bastard Motherfucker"	The Real Damage	2:57
13.	"Pay to Cum" (Bad Brains cover)	The Softcore Tour CD	2:05
14.	"Fix Me" (Black Flag cover)	The Softcore Tour CD	2:38
15.	"Hold Your Tongue"	Love, Ire & Song 7digital bonus tracks	3:33
16.	"Front Crawl"	Love, Ire & Song 7digital bonus tracks	2:47
17.	"Jet Lag" (rock version)	Love, Ire & Song 7digital bonus tracks	4:00
18.	"Photosynthesis"	Truck Sessions (June 2008)	4:04
19.	"Worse Things Happen at Sea"	Truck Sessions (June 2008)	4:01
20.	"Imperfect Tense"	Truck Sessions (June 2008)	3:52
21.	"The District Sleeps Alone Tonight" (The Postal Service cover)	Previously unreleased	2:51
22.	"Smiling at Strangers on Trains" (Million Dead cover)	Previously unreleased	4:05
23.	"Dancing Queen" (ABBA cover)	Previously unreleased	3:41
24.	"Longing for the Day"	Frank Turner Demo; iTunes-only bonus track	5:12
