= Mïngle Härde =

English band

- Also known as: Möngöl Hörde (2012–2022)
- Origin: London, UK
- Genres: Hardcore punk, post-hardcore, noise rock
- Years active: 2012–present
- Members: Frank Turner – aka "Renrut"; Ben Dawson – aka "Awesome"; Matt Nasir – aka "Nadir"
- Website: mingleharde.com

Mïngle Härde (formerly Möngöl Hörde) is an English hardcore punk band, formed in London in 2012. The group features Frank Turner on vocals, Ben Dawson on drums and Matt Nasir on guitar. Turner and Dawson are both former members of hardcore punk outfit Million Dead. Frank Turner is now best known for his solo folk-punk material, and Matt Nasir is part of his backing band, The Sleeping Souls. Lyrically, Mïngle Härde is not as serious as Frank Turner's other projects, with Turner stating, "Lyrically it's very different from what I do now, it's kind of depraved. The first song we wrote is about Natalie Portman's tapeworm using her as a glove puppet to lead an uprising in Hollywood. We're writing a whole pile of new songs and we're going to do some live dates soon."

The band made their live débuts at free shows in London and Leeds in the two days before the band played on the Lock Up Stage at Reading and Leeds Festival.

Their self-titled debut album was released on 26 May 2014.

The band played four shows in early 2018, their first shows together in three and a half years. The setlist included two new songs and two Million Dead covers.

In June 2019, the band announced two new songs could be downloaded with any purchase from their store, as well as a US Tour for December that year. In July the band played at 2000 Trees Festival, their only UK performance in 2019.

On 1 April 2022 the band debuted their new single "Taxi for the Horde" which references previous songs such as "Godfrey Newman", "Stillborn Unicorn" and "Blistering Blue Barnacles". With the release, the band also announced their name change to Mïngle Härde.

They cited influences including Refused, Hot Snakes, Converge and Napalm Death.

== Members ==
- Frank Turner – vocals
- Matt Nasir – baritone guitar
- Ben Dawson – drums

== Discography ==
=== Studio albums ===
- Möngöl Hörde (2014)
