= Sons of Freedom =

Sons of Freedom may refer to:

- Sons of Freedom (band), a Canadian alternative rock band in the 1990s
- Freedomites, a.k.a. "Sons of Freedom", a now extinct Canadian Christian group and extremist movement from Russia, often mistaken as Doukhobors
- Members of the political Freedom Party of British Columbia

== See also ==
- Sons of Liberty (disambiguation)
