= No Man's Land (Frank Turner album) =

Studio album by Frank Turner
- Released: 16 August 2019
- Recorded: 2019
- Genre: Folk punk, folk rock
- Length: 48:09
- Label: Xtra Mile; Polydor
- Producer: Catherine Marks

Frank Turner chronology
Be More Kind (2018)	No Man's Land (2019)	West Coast vs. Wessex (2020)

Singles from No Man's Land
- 1. "Sister Rosetta" Released: 3 July 2019

No Man's Land is the eighth studio album by English singer-songwriter Frank Turner, released on 16 August 2019 by Xtra Mile Recordings.

It is a concept album with songs about women from history, often with connections to music.

== Background ==
The album was announced alongside the release of the single "Sister Rosetta" on July 3, 2019. Turner wrote the album as a way of drawing attention to the lives of "fascinating women" whose amazing lives were overlooked due to their gender. These women include Byzantine princess Kassiani, Huda Sha'arawi, Nannie Doss, Nica Rothschild, Sister Rosetta Tharpe, Jinny Bingham, Dora Hand and the CPR training manikin Resusci Anne. Alongside the album's release, Turner and Somethin' Else released a podcast entitled Tales From No Man's Land in which he discusses the story of every woman that the songs are based on. The album also features a new recording of the song "Silent Key" previously released on Turner's sixth album Positive Songs for Negative People.

== Reception ==
Professional ratings
Aggregate scores
Source	Rating
Metacritic	63/100
Review scores
Source	Rating
AllMusic	3.5/5 stars
Evening Standard	2/5 stars
The Times	2/5 stars
The Independent	2/5 stars
NME	2/5 stars
The Arts Desk	3/5 stars
The Spill Magazine	4/5 stars

The album received generally favorable reviews with an aggregate score of 63/100 on Metacritic. Many praised Turner's return to folk instead of the indie pop sound of his previous album Be More Kind. However, the idea of the album saw much controversy, and the album received incredibly negative reviews from publishers such as The Independent and NME. The Independent described the album as "extreme mansplaining" and criticised the instrumentation as being "plodding" and Turner's limited vocal range being incredibly evident. NME stated that the album was too similar to Turner's previous work, leading to the voices of the woman involved being completely overshadowed. The Mic, however, argued that No Man's Land succeeded as an "astoundingly versatile and sensitive" concept album, noting that "overwhelmingly Turner opts for well realised curveballs as opposed to safe and unadventurous folk music".

== Track listing ==
All tracks are written by Frank Turner, except where noted.

No.	Title	Subject	Length
1.	"Jinny Bingham's Ghost"	Jinny Bingham	2:55
2.	"Sister Rosetta"	Sister Rosetta Tharpe	3:48
3.	"I Believed You William Blake"	Catherine Blake	3:35
4.	"Nica"	Pannonica de Koenigswarter	4:35
5.	"A Perfect Wife"	Nannie Doss	2:36
6.	"Silent Key"	Christa McAuliffe	3:57
7.	"Eye of the Day"	Mata Hari	5:14
8.	"The Death of Dora Hand"	Dora Hand	4:16
9.	"The Graveyard of the Outcast Dead"	The "Winchester Geese" buried in Cross Bones burial ground	3:39
10.	"The Lioness"	Huda Sha'arawi	3:10
11.	"The Hymn of Kassiani"	Kassia	3:30
12.	"Rescue Annie"	Resusci Anne	4:14
13.	"Rosemary Jane"	Frank Turner's mother	3:45
Total length:			48:09

== Personnel ==
Adapted from AllMusic.

- Frank Turner – lead vocals, acoustic guitar, electric guitar, bass guitar, mandolin, percussion, piano, synthesiser

Additional musicians

- Netty Brown – trumpet
- Jeff Dazey – saxophone
- Andrea Goldsworthy – upright bass
- Jessica Guise – backing vocals
- Rio Hellyer – vocal arrangements
- Carol Jarvis – trombone
- Anna Jenkins – violin, viola
- Marianne Johnson – vocal arrangements
- Holly Madge – drums
- Kat Marsh – vocal arrangements
- Clare McInerney – clarinet
- Matt Nasir – string arrangements
- Rebecca Need-Menear – vocal arrangements
- Kate Pavil – vocal arrangements
- Lionicio Saenz – trumpet
- Gill Sandell – accordion, piano
- Jo Silverston – cello
- Rachel Still – vocal arrangements
- Eleanor Tinlin – vocal arrangements
- Julia Webb – vocal arrangements

Production

- Catherine Marks – production, mixing
- Frank Arkwright – mastering
- Grace Banks – engineering
- Adam "Cecil" Bartlett – engineer

Additional personnel

- Richard Andrews – design
- Olivia M Healy – illustrations
- Richard O'Donovan – A&R

== Charts ==
Chart (2019)	Peak position
Austrian Albums (Ö3 Austria)	49
German Albums (Offizielle Top 100)	22
Scottish Albums (OCC)	4
UK Albums (OCC)	3
