= Long Live the Queen (song) =

Single by Frank Turner

from the album Love Ire & Song
- Released: 19 October 2008
- Genre: Folk rock
- Length: 3:26
- Label: Xtra Mile Records
- Songwriter(s): Frank Turner

Frank Turner singles chronology
"Reasons Not to Be an Idiot" (2008)	"Long Live the Queen" (2008)	"The Road" (2008)

Music video
- "Long Live the Queen" on YouTube

"Long Live the Queen" was the third and final single from UK based songwriter Frank Turner's second album Love Ire & Song. It was released as a digital download and as a 7" split single along with Crazy Arm's "Still to Keep". The 7" split was released on 22 March 2010 to celebrate his huge tour in March 2010, and features a live recording of "Long Live the Queen" recorded live at London's Shepherd's Bush Empire and taken from Frank Turner's 2010 live DVD Take to the Road.

"Long Live the Queen" was released as a benefit single for the Breast Cancer Campaign, in honour of a close friend who succumbed to the disease. The song's lyrics are based on what his dying friend told him.

== Digital track listing ==
All tracks are written by Frank Turner

No.	Title	Length
1.	"Long Live the Queen" (Frank Turner)	3:26
Total length:		3:26

== 7" track listing ==
Cat Number XMR748
No.	Title	Length
1.	"Long Live the Queen" (Frank Turner)	3:26
2.	"Still To Keep" (Crazy Arm)	4:01
Total length:		7:27

== Charts ==
Chart (2008)	Peak position
UK Singles (OCC)	65
