= Goliath and the Giants =

Swedish rock band

Goliath and the Giants is an indie rock/pop band from Sweden. Formed in Helsingborg in 2008, the group's musical style has been compared to that of rock acts like Incubus, Kings Of Leon and Red Hot Chili Peppers.

== History ==
Goliath and the Giants was formed in 2008 by childhood friends Rasmus Lind, Mattias Blomberg and Hampus Olofsson in Helsingborg, Sweden. They were soon joined by Daniel Jönsson which led them to their demo tape recording of 14 songs that escalated the band to play on festivals and the club scene. After two years of festival and club shows the band entered the studio to start working on their first album.

Their self-titled debut album was released on the band's own label Giant Music and recorded with longtime friend Marcus Forsberg at his Tweak Studio.

As of November 2010 two official videos had been released for the album Goliath and the Giants. The video for the first single, "Jaywalking", was made and directed by the band itself. "We will never make that kind of a video again ourselves", Jönsson said when asked about the video in an interview. The video for the second single, "Island in the Sun", was also directed by the band.

On February 28, 2011, the band announced that their album was scheduled to be released the week of March 18, 2011, and was promoted as being the first album without a CD. They did this to minimise its environmental impact and to keep down its costs. Instead of a classic CD, they included a digital download code so that the buyer could download the album from the band's webpage, burn it onto a CD and place it in its recyclable, eco-friendly packaging.

== Album ==
The track listing of the album Goliath and the Giants is:

1. "You Got Me Out Of Bed"
2. "Jaywalking"
3. "December"
4. "My Friend"
5. "Hangin' Around"
6. "Island in the Sun"
7. "End of the Line"
8. "You Should Never Have Fallen For Me"
9. "Back To Sleep"
10. "Not Alone"
11. "Follow"
12. "Bitter Part"

== Members ==
- Daniel Jönsson - vocals
- Rasmus Lind - guitar
- Hampus Olofsson - bass
- Mattias Blomberg - drums

== Discography ==
Studio albums:

- Goliath and the Giants (2011)
- Done Deed (2012)
