= Campfire Punkrock =

EP by Frank Turner
- Released: May 15, 2006
- Recorded: February 2006, Tarrant Anderson's house, Oxford, England
- Genre: Folk punk
- Length: 17:40
- Label: Xtra Mile Recordings; Good Friends Records
- Producer: Ben Lloyd

Frank Turner chronology
Frank Turner Demo (2005)	Campfire Punkrock (2006)	Sleep Is For The Week (2007)

Professional ratings
Review scores
Source	Rating
AbsolutePunk.net	(73%) link

Campfire Punkrock is the first EP by UK based songwriter Frank Turner. The EP was released via Xtra Mile Recordings on May 15, 2006. The vinyl release includes a live version of "The Ballad of Me and My Friends" and is pressed on a sulfur-yellow 10" vinyl.

The EP was recorded by Turner's guitarist Ben Lloyd at the Oxford home of Turner's bass player Tarrant Anderson. It was mixed by Tristan Ivemy who later mixed Turner's second album, Love, Ire and Song, and who helped record and produce Frank Turner's fourth full-length release, England Keep My Bones.

== Personnel ==
- Frank Turner - Acoustic Guitar / Vocals
- Ben Lloyd - Electric Guitar
- Nigel Powell - Drums
- Tarrant Anderson - Bass

== Track listing ==
No.	Title	Length
1.	"Nashville Tennessee"	3:44
2.	"Thatcher Fucked The Kids"	3:19
3.	"This Town Ain't Big Enough For The One Of Me"	3:07
4.	"Casanova Lament"	2:14
5.	"I Really Don't Care What You Did On Your Gap Year"	5:06

== Vinyl release track listing ==
No.	Title	Length
1.	"Nashville Tennessee"	3:44
2.	"Thatcher Fucked The Kids"	3:19
3.	"This Town Ain't Big Enough For The One Of Me"	3:07
4.	"Casanova Lament"	2:14
5.	"I Really Don't Care What You Did With Your Gap Year"	5:06
6.	"The Ballad of Me and My Friends"	2:33

== Charts ==
Chart performance for Campfire Punkrock
Chart (2026)	Peak position
Scottish Albums (OCC)	22
UK Albums Sales (OCC)	12
UK Independent Albums (OCC)	7

== Formats ==
Format	Colour	Number
vinyl	Yellow	700
vinyl	Black	200
vinyl	Yellow/Black Splatter	100
CD
