= Positive Songs for Negative People =

Studio album by Frank Turner
- Released: 7 August 2015
- Recorded: December 2014
- Studio: Traxidermy Studios (Nashville)
- Genres: Folk punk, folk rock
- Length: 39:45
- Label: Xtra Mile
- Producer: Butch Walker

Frank Turner chronology
The Third Three Years (2014)	Positive Songs for Negative People (2015)	Be More Kind (2018)

Singles from Positive Songs for Negative People
- 1. "The Next Storm" Released: 25 July 2015

Positive Songs for Negative People is the sixth studio album by English singer/songwriter Frank Turner. It was released on 7 August 2015 by Xtra Mile Recordings. The album garnered a positive reception but critics said it was derivative of Turner's previous works. Positive Songs for Negative People debuted at number 2 in the UK and number 69 on the Billboard 200 and spawned only one single: "The Next Storm". To promote the record, Turner toured across North America, Europe and Australia.

== Promotion ==
On 15 June 2015, Turner announced a few UK tour dates on November to promote the upcoming album, beginning with Llandudno's Venue Cymru arena and finishing at London's Alexandra Palace. On 19 August, he added some in-store performances during his US tour on September and October, starting in Boston's Newbury Comics and ending at Houston's Cactus Music. On 10 November, Turner went on an extensive worldwide tour to promote the record along with his first box set The First Ten Years, beginning with Falmouth, Cornwall's Princess Pavilion and ending on Miami's Salty Dog Cruise.

== Critical reception ==
Professional ratings
Aggregate scores
Source	Rating
Metacritic	69/100
Review scores
Source	Rating
The A.V. Club	B+
AbsolutePunk	(85%)
AllMusic	3.5/5 stars
Consequence of Sound	B
DIY	2/5 stars
Drowned in Sound	3/10
The Guardian	3/5 stars
NME	8/10
Paste	6.8/10
Rolling Stone	2.5/5 stars

Positive Songs for Negative People received favourable reviews but music critics were divided over Turner's vocal delivery and lyricism. At Metacritic, which assigns a normalized rating out of 100 to reviews from mainstream critics, the album received an average score of 69, based on 20 reviews.

Mark Beaumont of NME praised the sentiments spread throughout the record and the variety of emotions the songs bring out. Eric Swedlund of The A.V. Club found the album better than Tape Deck Heart, praising the upbeat demeanor that goes along with Turner's songwriting, saying that "[T]he result pushes Turner and his band back into more energetic territory after the careful, pristine sound of his previous effort." Thom Jurek of AllMusic praised the record's eclectic musicianship combined with uplifting and introspective lyrics, calling it "an invigorating, infectious set that reaffirms Turner's faith in music's power to motivate and heal."

Alexis Petridis of The Guardian found some of the material weary with its earnestness and rousing bombast, but said that they were outweighed with more melancholic tracks like "Silent Key" and "Song for Josh", concluding that, "For all its flaws, Positive Songs for Negative People feels like the work of someone who knows exactly what he's doing." Ryan Reed of Paste noted that the songs throughout were marred by a mixture of embarrassing lyrics with soaring choruses, concluding that "Turner leaves behind considerable wreckage with Positive Songs—in ways both cathartic and clumsy. And as usual, he goes down swinging."

Stuart Knapman of DIY found the album's various themes lacking in terms of insight and character that worked well in previous efforts, saying that "'Positive Songs…' simply fails to live up to the high standards Turner has previously set." Benjamin Bland of Drowned in Sound criticised the record for being a re-hash of previous material that replaces the charm and witty lyricism with off-putting delivery and generic lyrics that are "almost self-parody level at times." Bland said that, "This is Turner's most staid and uninvolving work to date, suggesting that some of the filler that clogged up 2013's decent enough Tape Deck Heart was a sign of things to come."

== Commercial performance ==
The album debuted at number 2 in the UK behind Dr. Dre's Compton during the week of 14 August 2015. On the Billboard 200, it debuted and peaked at number 69 the week of 29 August 2015, before leaving the chart completely. It additionally charted within the top 40 of several additional territories, surpassing what Tape Deck Heart achieved previously. The record debuted at number 7 in Germany before dropping to number 34 the next week and leaving the chart. It debuted at numbers 11 and 21 in Switzerland and Austria respectively (whereas his previous album charted at numbers 79 and 34 respectively).

== Track listing ==
All tracks are written by Frank Turner, except where noted.

Standard edition
No.	Title	Writer(s)	Length
1.	"The Angel Islington"		2:26
2.	"Get Better"		2:46
3.	"The Next Storm"		3:34
4.	"The Opening Act of Spring"	Frank Turner; Matt Nasir	3:00
5.	"Glorious You"		3:15
6.	"Mittens"		4:30
7.	"Out of Breath"		2:06
8.	"Demons"		4:05
9.	"Josephine"		3:22
10.	"Love Forty Down"		2:30
11.	"Silent Key"		4:40
12.	"Song for Josh"		3:28

Deluxe edition bonus tracks
No.	Title	Length
1.	"Get Better" (acoustic version)	2:50
2.	"The Next Storm" (acoustic version)	3:34
3.	"The Opening Act of Spring" (acoustic version)	3:20
4.	"Glorious You" (acoustic version)	3:51
5.	"Mittens" (acoustic version)	4:18
6.	"Out of Breath" (acoustic version)	2:00
7.	"Demons" (acoustic version)	4:26
8.	"Josephine" (acoustic version)	3:29
9.	"Love Forty Down" (acoustic version)	2:35
10.	"Silent Key" (acoustic version)	4:26

iTunes pre-order bonus track
No.	Title	Length
1.	"Old Flames"	3:39

== Personnel ==
Adapted credits from the liner notes of Positive Songs for Negative People.

Frank Turner & the Sleeping Souls

- Frank Turner – lead vocals, acoustic guitar, electric guitar
- Ben Lloyd – electric guitar, backing vocals
- Tarrant Anderson – bass guitar, backing vocals
- Matt Nasir – piano, organ, synthesizer, mandolin, mandola, acoustic guitar, backing vocals
- Nigel Powell – drums and percussion, backing vocals

Additional musicians

- Jeff Kievit – trumpet (6)
- David Peel – horn (6)
- Mike Davis – trombone (6)
- Andy Snitzer – tenor sax (6)
- Cahir O'Doherty – scream (7)
- Esmé Patterson – vocals (11)
- Todd Stopera – backing vocals
- Butch Walker – backing vocals
- Lindi Ortega – backing vocals
- Jaclyn Monroe – backing vocals
- Kat Jones – backing vocals
- Billy the Kid – backing vocals

Recording personnel

- Butch Walker – producer
- Todd Stopera – engineer
- Chris Clark – additional engineering (11)
- Graham Kay – additional engineering (12)
- Ben Lloyd – additional engineering (12)
- Claudius Mittendorfer – mixing
- Frank Arkwright – mastering

Artwork

- Go de Jong – art direction and design
- Nicole Kibert – live photo
- Jamie-James Medina – studio photography

== Charts ==
Chart (2015)	Peak position
Australian Albums (ARIA)	55
Austrian Albums (Ö3 Austria)	21
Belgian Albums (Ultratop Flanders)	114
Dutch Albums (Album Top 100)	28
German Albums (Offizielle Top 100)	7
Irish Albums (IRMA)	35
Scottish Albums (Official Charts)	2
Swiss Albums (Schweizer Hitparade)	11
UK Albums (Official Charts)	2
UK Album Downloads (Official Charts)	4
US Billboard 200	69
US Americana/Folk Albums (Billboard)	3
US Top Alternative Albums (Billboard)	5
US Top Rock Albums (Billboard)	9
US Vinyl Albums (Billboard)	9

== Certifications ==
Region	Certification	Certified units/sales
United Kingdom (BPI)	Silver	60,000^{‡}
^{‡} Sales+streaming figures based on certification alone.
