= Frank Turner =

English singer-songwriter

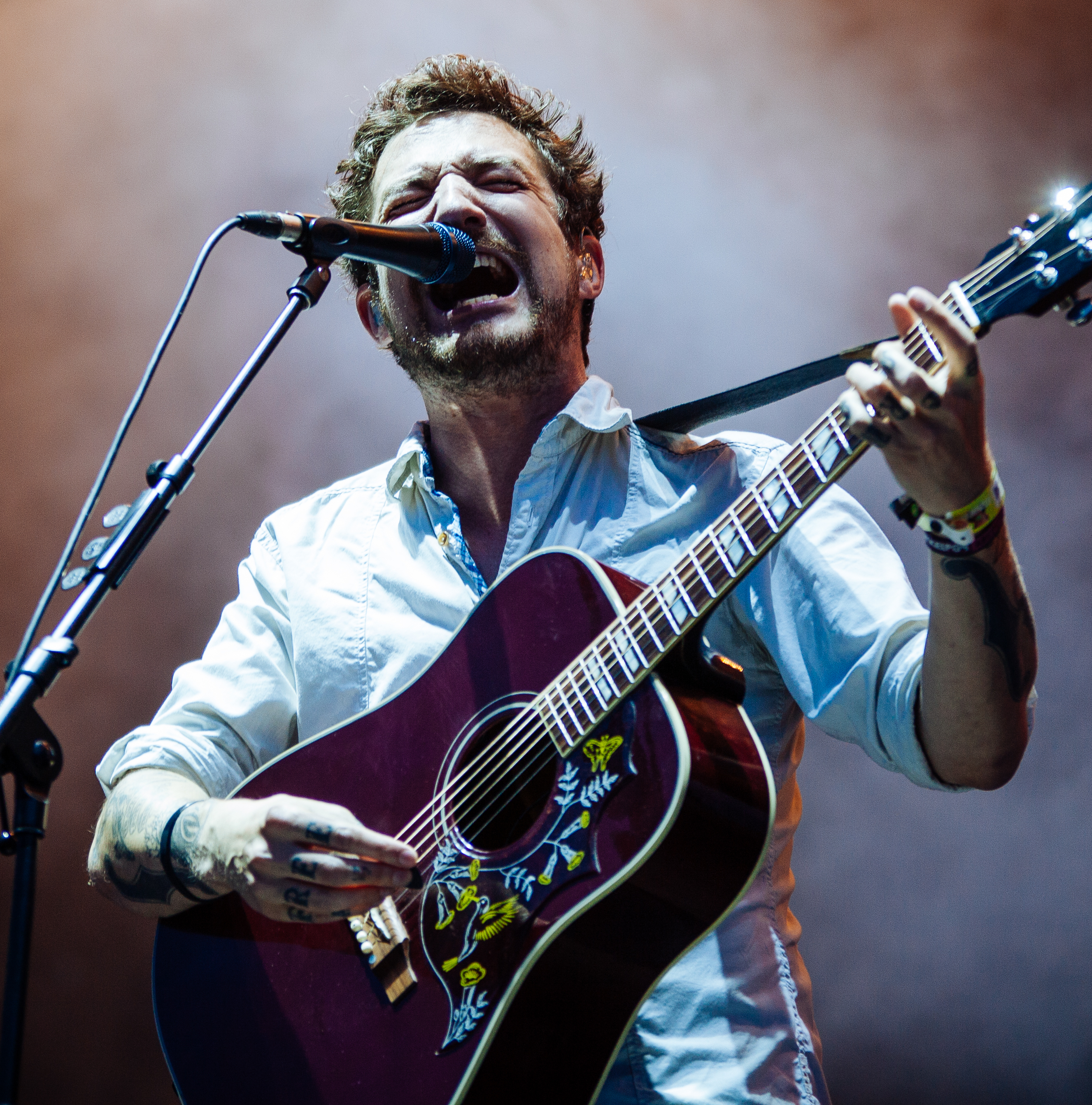
- Turner in 2014

Background information
- Also known as: Frank 'Dave' Turner; Renrut; The Product
- Born: Francis Edward Turner; 28 December 1981 (age 44); Manama, Bahrain
- Origin: Meonstoke, Hampshire, England
- Genres: Folk; folk punk; folk rock; post-hardcore; punk rock; acoustic rock; alternative rock
- Occupation: Singer-songwriter
- Instruments: Guitar; vocals; harmonica; piano
- Years active: 2001–2027
- Labels: Xtra Mile Recordings (UK); Interscope (US); Epitaph; Paper + Plastick; Polydor
- Member of: Mïngle Härde; Million Dead; Kneejerk
- Website: frank-turner.com

Francis Edward Turner (born 28 December 1981) is an English punk and folk singer-songwriter. He began his career as the vocalist of post-hardcore band Million Dead, then embarked upon a primarily acoustic-based solo career following the band's split in 2005. In the studio and during live performances, Turner is accompanied by his backing band, The Sleeping Souls, consisting of Ben Lloyd (guitar, mandolin), Tarrant Anderson (bass), Matt Nasir (piano, mandolin) and Callum Green (drums).

To date, Turner has released ten solo albums, four rarities compilation albums, one retrospective "best of" album, one split album and five EPs. Turner's ninth studio album, FTHC was released on 11 February 2022 and reached number one in the UK albums chart in the week following its release.

Turner is known for his prolific and extensive touring schedule, where he has performed over 3100 shows to date. The tenth and final edition of Turner's yearly festival, Lost Evenings, will take place at Wembley Arena in November 2027 and will mark the beginning of an extended hiatus from performing and recording.

== Early life ==
Turner was born to Jane Cartwright, a primary school head teacher, and Miranda Turner, an investment banker, who came out as a trans woman in 2015. Upon returning to England, the family settled first in Winchester before moving to Meonstoke. His maternal grandfather is Richard Fox Cartwright (1913–2009), Bishop of Plymouth. Through Miranda, his grandparents are Sir (Ronald) Mark (Cunliffe) Turner (1906–1980), a merchant banker who was also the chairman of high street retailer BHS, and Margaret, daughter of Sir Hereward Wake, 13th Baronet.

As a child, Turner played the piano, before teaching himself to play the guitar at the age of 11. He discovered his love for music through seeing an Iron Maiden poster on his friend's bedroom wall whilst playing Warhammer, and he convinced his parents to buy him a copy of the album Killers and later a guitar. Turner was educated at Summer Fields and subsequently on a scholarship at Eton College, where he studied alongside Prince William. He has since described his experiences of being at boarding school as traumatic, having led to periods of self-harm and suicidal ideation.

== Musical career ==
=== Beginnings and Million Dead ===
The first record Turner owned was the album Killers by Iron Maiden. Metal was the first genre of music he fell in love with, and he remains a passionate fan. Turner's musical career began at school, with the short-lived alternative band Kneejerk. The band released three records and played several shows around the UK. The last record, their only full-length, was titled The Half-Life of Kissing and was released by Yorkshire DIY hardcore label Sakari Empire after the band had broken up.

In 2001, Turner joined London post-hardcore band Million Dead at the invitation of former Kneejerk drummer Ben Dawson. In 2005, after four years and two albums, the band announced that they were parting ways, for "irreconcilable differences within the band mean that it would be impossible to continue." Around that time, Turner got a tape with Bruce Springsteen's Nebraska on it; he later said "That was a really big moment for me hearing that record in terms of a turn around in my music career, from hardcore punk bands to what I'm doing now."

=== 2005–2008: Sleep is for the Week and Love Ire and Song ===
Turner's first solo shows took place prior to the break-up of Million Dead, with a set at the Smalltown America all-dayer at 93 Feet East in London. After the band's split, Turner felt that "it seemed like the logical thing to do to try my hand at playing these songs more publicly and more concertedly than before". Turner states that "when Million Dead finished, I wanted to stay on tour, but I didn't want the hassle of putting a band together."

After a split EP with rock band Reuben, Turner's first solo EP, Campfire Punkrock, was released in May 2006 on Xtra Mile Recordings, with him being recorded and backed by Oxford band Dive Dive whom he had met while out on tour with Reuben. Band members Tarrant Anderson, Ben Lloyd and Nigel Powell would become his backing band from this point on, with most of his subsequent UK headline tours being full band shows.

After Turner toured in support of American singer-songwriter Jonah Matranga, the two released a split EP in August 2006.

In September, Turner was the last act to appear on Steve Lamacq's Lamacq Live show on BBC Radio 1.

Turner's debut full-length studio album, Sleep Is for the Week was released in January 2007, again recorded at Dive Dive's studio, produced by their guitarist Ben Lloyd and featuring drummer Nigel Powell.

After an extensive tour, including dates supporting yourcodenameis:milo and Biffy Clyro, and an appearance at SXSW, Turner released an EP, The Real Damage, in May 2007.

After a further tour with Jonah Matranga and Jacob Golden, the "All About The Destination" DVD was released in October 2007, before Turner returned to the studio in Hampshire to record his second album. The album, Love Ire & Song again saw Ben Lloyd from Dive Dive in the producer's seat, and was released on 31 March 2008, followed by an extensive UK tour with Andy Yorke and Chris T-T. T-T also joined the live lineup on keyboards through summer 2008.

During summer 2008, Turner made several festival appearances, including sets at Y Not Festival, Two Thousand Trees Festival, the Cambridge Folk Festival, Truck, Glastonbury, Jam by the Lake (in Durham) and the Reading and Leeds Festivals.

In October/November, during his 2008 UK Tour for the Love, Ire and Song album, he became ill with gastroenteritis, and was forced to leave the stage in Nottingham halfway through his set. All remaining shows, which included Nottingham, Liverpool and Ireland, were cancelled, the first time that Turner as a solo artist had cancelled any show in 10 years. He went on to reschedule all cancelled shows in January 2009.

In December 2008, Turner released The First Three Years, a compilation of demos, B-sides and covers that were not featured on either of his first two studio albums.

Frank Turner at The Park in Peterborough 2007

=== 2009–2010: Poetry of the Deed ===
In January 2009, Turner released a combined package of Love Ire & Song and The First Three Years, and supported the Gaslight Anthem on their tour of the UK and Europe, demoing several new songs and announcing his plans to record a new album.

The new album was produced by Alex Newport. Recording took place in April and May 2009 at Leeders Farm in Norwich and the producer's own studio, Future Shock, in Brooklyn, New York City.

Turner's band at the time still consisted of Ben Lloyd, Tarrant Anderson and Nigel Powell from Dive Dive, with keyboardist Matt Nasir having been added on the Love, Ire and Song tour.

Prior to recording Poetry of the Deed, Turner stated that:

The new album is about 75% written – in the sense that the songs, as skeletons, are done, but this time round I'm rehearsing the material with my band before we record, so I'm sure that some things will change in terms of structure and arrangement as we settle into them. We're recording the album as a band this time round, I'm really excited about it, the guys I play with are phenomenal musicians, and hopefully this way I'll be able to close the gap a little between live and studio. Material-wise I'm really happy about where I am at the moment, though not complacent; there's a fair amount of pressure for this record, from me more than anyone else. The album is going to be called Poetry of the Deed.

Turner was announced as the support act on The Offspring's summer tour, during which he documented his travels with a blog on British music website NME. When talking about the support slot, Turner stated: "Smash was one of the first punk records I ever bought, and I'm blown away to even be considered for the shows. From a "career" point of view, it's also great – playing to many thousands of people a night across the States is an opportunity not to be sniffed at."

On 28 April 2009, Turner signed with Epitaph Records for releases outside the UK.

Turner's third studio album, Poetry of the Deed, was released on 7 September 2009, and reached No. 36 in the UK album chart. The album's first single, "The Road", received the status of 'Hottest Record in the World Today' by BBC Radio 1 DJ Zane Lowe on 14 July 2009. The track, "Poetry of the Deed", was released as the second single from the album.

In late 2009, Turner embarked upon a UK tour with his band in support of the album (with singer-songwriter Beans On Toast and US band Fake Problems as support acts), culminating in a sell-out show at the O2 Shepherd's Bush Empire on 29 October 2009. A live DVD/CD, entitled Take to the Road, documenting two shows from the tour (O2 Shepherd's Bush Empire and the Union Chapel) was released in the UK in March 2010.

In November 2009, Turner toured the US alongside Chuck Ragan, Jim Ward, Tim Barry, Joey Cape, Dave Hause, and others, as part of the 2009 Revival Tour. Turner returned to Europe on 28 November and to the UK on 19 December. He completed the year with a New Year's Eve show at The Spiegeltent in Gloucester.

In early 2010, Turner played several more UK gigs, with Chuck Ragan and Crazy Arm supporting. He also accompanied Flogging Molly and The Architects on the 2010 Green 17 Tour, and announced via his Twitter that he was working on new songs.

From 22 April to 1 May 2010, Turner toured Australia with Chuck Ragan, Tim Barry, and Ben Nichols of Lucero for the 2010 Revival Tour.

In May 2010 Turner travelled to China to play a six city tour with promoters Split Works.

In June 2010 he supported Green Day on their stadium shows, and also featured as the cover star of Kerrang! magazine for the first time, with an article inside documenting his solo career up to that point.

Turner played at many festivals throughout the summer of 2010, including his headlining appearance at the Two Thousand Trees Festival, playing his new song "I Still Believe". The song was released first as a single and then appeared on his Rock & Roll EP. Turner also contributed one song, a cover of "Build Me Up Buttercup", to Centrepoint's 2010 charity cover album 1969 Key to Change.

On 24 September 2010, Turner released Buddies, a 10 track split album with American alternative country artist, Jon Snodgrass. The pair recorded the album in Colorado whilst on tour together.

=== 2011–2012: England Keep My Bones ===
On 25 January 2011, he was nominated for two Shockwaves NME Awards, for best Solo Artist and best Band Blog or Twitter.

Turner announced on his Twitter on 24 February 2011 that his fourth studio album would be called England Keep My Bones and that it would be released in the UK on 6 June 2011 and worldwide on 7 June 2011. He also announced details of solo tours in Australia, Germany, the UK, and the US & Canada. Turner started the recording of this album on 10 January 2011 and finished recording on 20 January 2011, with mixing completed in February 2011. In March 2011, Turner stated that:

I wanted this album to feel more like a solo record made with a band, whereas the last record was more of a band album overall. There's still a fair bit of 'rock' material on the record, but there's a lot more folky, acoustic material this time around than last time. I'm not taking any drastic stylistic turns here, but there are little forays into new territory at the edges. 'Poetry' was definitely off to one side of the spectrum for me. This record is a bit more down the middle. There's even an acappella tune on there. But then there's a pretty full-on hardcore song as well.

Turner leaked a new song, "I Am Disappeared", to YouTube on 29 March 2011, later making it available for free download through Xtra Mile. He also announced that he would soon be releasing "Peggy Sang the Blues" as the first single from the album.

On 21 March 2011, it was announced that Turner would be making the step up to the main stage at Reading and Leeds in August 2011. He spoke about the "perks" of playing Reading in an interview with 6 Towns Radio.

Turner also played Download, Blissfields and Cambridge Folk festivals, as well as many other festivals across Europe, and as a headliner at Blissfields Festival.

On 21 April 2011, Turner played his 1000th solo show at the Strummerville festival in Shoreditch, London.

Several songs from England Keep My Bones were debuted at Play Fest (a new music festival in Norfolk) on 28 May 2011.

During his May 2011 tour, Turner played a new song, tentatively titled "Rod Stewart". This song was later retitled "Sailor's Boots" and was released as the B-side to "If Ever I Stray".

England Keep My Bones entered the UK chart at number 12 on its week of release, Turner's highest-charting album at that point (later surpassed by FTHC, released 11 February 2022, which reached #1).

Turner later released a rarities compilation, titled The Second Three Years, on 18 November 2011 through Xtra Mile Recordings and 16 January 2012 through Epitaph Records. The album compiled material recorded after the release of Turner's first compilation, The First Three Years, that did not appear on either of Turner's two successive studio albums, including tracks from EPs, singles, covers and unreleased material.

In spring 2012, he played several dates in Canada as an opening act for Joel Plaskett. On 13 April 2012, Turner headlined Wembley Arena to a sold-out crowd of 12,000. Support for the show came from Beans On Toast, dan le sac vs Scroobius Pip and Billy Bragg.

On 27 July 2012, Turner and the Sleeping Souls performed at the pre-show for the London 2012 Olympics Opening Ceremony. The band played "Sailor's Boots", "Wessex Boy", and "I Still Believe".

In August 2012, Turner unveiled his new side project, Möngöl Hörde, a hardcore band including drummer Ben Dawson (formerly of Million Dead) and Sleeping Souls keyboardist Matt Nasir on guitar. The group played their first shows in London and Leeds shortly before playing at the Reading and Leeds Festivals, where they debuted some new material and covered tracks by acts including The Streets and Nirvana.

In October 2012, 'Believe', Turner's own beer, a 4.8% modern wheat beer brewed with Signature Brew, was announced.

Turner opened for the Dropkick Murphys on their European tour, also headlining a tour in November and December 2012.

=== 2013–2014: Tape Deck Heart, Möngöl Hörde and The Third Three Years ===
Turner recorded his fifth studio album in Burbank, California, in October 2012. The decision to record abroad for the first time in California was due to producer Rich Costey's refusal to bring all of his equipment to England, so he persuaded Turner to record in Burbank instead. Turner announced via Twitter on 28 October 2012 that recording was completed, and mixing and mastering would be done in time for a March 2013 release date.

During the November and December 2012 UK tour, a CD titled Good Hangs from Xtra Mile Recordings was distributed for free at Turner shows; this included a yet-to-be-released Turner song titled "Tattoos" plus the Möngöl Hörde song "Casual Threats From Weekend Hardmen".

On Christmas Day 2012, the song "Four Simple Words" was released on the Xtra Mile Recordings' website as a free download along with the B-side "Cowboy Chords". On 4 January 2013, a video was shot for what would be the first single. On the same day Turner announced on Twitter that the single was the song "Recovery". On 9 January, Turner revealed the titles of all 13 songs on his new album via Instagram. This included songs played during the UK and US tours of 2012 such as "Anymore", "Plain Sailing Weather", "We Shall Not Overcome" and "Tell Tale Signs". He also posted on his fan forum that an extended edition of the album would include an extra 5 or 6 songs. On 19 February 2013, it was announced that Turner had signed a licensing deal with Interscope Records in the US for Tape Deck Heart.

Following the release of the album, Turner embarked on a short UK tour. He was also confirmed as the headline act for the Two Thousand Trees Festival and main stage slots at the Reading and Leeds festivals. Following the success of the album, Turner embarked on a UK arena tour, including a date at London's O2 Arena.

On 3 January 2014, Turner appeared on the BBC's Celebrity Mastermind answering questions on Iron Maiden, scoring 20 points in total (7 on his specialist subject), and coming first.

In 2014 Turner and Möngöl Hörde released a full-length self-titled studio album, and toured in support of that album in late June, playing a run of smaller venues. In July of that year, Turner also announced a 15 Date UK tour, playing places that would not normally feature live music such as local town halls.

On 25 July 2014, Turner announced on his Twitter page that he was collating The Third Three Years. It was released on 24 November 2014.

=== 2015–2016: The Road Beneath My Feet and Positive Songs for Negative People ===
In 2014, Turner announced that he was in the process of writing a book, consisting of tour diaries and travel memoirs, asking fans to contribute to the book by sending in stories and pictures they shared with Turner. The book, titled The Road Beneath My Feet, named after lyrics from Turner's song "The Road", was released on 26 March 2015, published by Headline Publishing Group. Following the book release, Turner embarked on a 2015 book tour, which included signings, question-and-answer sessions and live solo performances from Turner. The book went straight into the bestseller charts.

On 20 March 2015, Turner released a lyric video promoting a new song called "Get Better" which was to be on his sixth album. Alongside it, he offered a free download of the song from his website. On 29 April 2015, following several posts of a similar nature on social media, a picture was posted of the mastered album with no artwork. This was followed by an Instagram post on 11 May 2015, in which Turner shared the album's cover and its title, Positive Songs for Negative People.

On 1 June 2015, it was announced that Turner would play a set at Glastonbury 2015 on the Other Stage.

On 15 June 2015 Turner released the music video for "The Next Storm", the second single from Positive Songs.... The video features former mixed martial artist and All Elite Wrestling professional wrestler CM Punk.

Turner then released a three-song acoustic session on the website PunksInVegas.com, premiering "Josephine", "Love Forty Down" and "Glorious You".

Positive Songs for Negative People, produced by Butch Walker at his studio in Nashville, Tennessee, was released worldwide on 31 July 2015. A deluxe edition of the album was also made available featuring solo acoustic versions of 10 of the 12 original album tracks.

On 20 November 2015, a deluxe vinyl boxed set was released by Xtra Mile Recordings, entitled The First Ten Years, it brought together Turner's 3 compilation albums: The First Three Years, The Second Three Years and The Third Three Years, together with a new rarities disc, named Ten For Ten. Ten for Ten was also issued as a separate release on 12 February 2016.

On 26 August 2016, Turner played the Reading and Leeds Festivals for the 10th year in a row which is a record. This was his 1,955th show as a musician.

=== 2017–2018: Songbook and Be More Kind ===
On 27 January 2017, Turner re-released his debut album, Sleep Is for the Week, as a tenth anniversary edition. The re-released album was issued on CD and vinyl and consisted of 2 discs, the first being the original album and the second being a copy of Turner's very early CDR demo disc, including 6 demos. The release also included a download link for Live at the Vic, a recording of Turner's performance at the Victoria, Swindon on 6 April 2007.

On 10 February 2017, Turner released a new song entitled "The Sand in the Gears", a political song that seemingly refers to the election of Donald Trump as the President of the United States. The track was recorded live on 19 January 2017 at the Fillmore in Silver Spring, Maryland.

In March 2017, Turner was invited to visit Freetown, Sierra Leone, by The Joe Strummer Foundation. The foundation raises funds in the UK and distributes them to various charitable groups worldwide, including Way Out Arts, which brings music to disadvantaged street kids in Sierra Leone. Turner gave guitar lessons to some of the students at Way Out Arts, played and spoke on a local radio station and visited a number of city slums where he played to the residents. He followed up this trip with further visits to Sierra Leone in 2019 and 2020.

Throughout 2017, Turner and other members of the Sleeping Souls sporadically posted images of the band in the studio, eventually confirmed to be the sessions for his seventh studio album, with Turner revealing on social media in early November that recording for the album had been completed.

On 16 October 2017, Turner announced Songbook, a collection of old and personal favourite songs, as well as rerecorded and unreleased versions of old songs, to be released on 24 November 2017.

Songbook included a new song "There She Is", which Turner confirmed to also be on his upcoming seventh studio album through an Instagram story in November.

On 27 January 2018, Turner announced his seventh studio album Be More Kind and leaked a track from the album, "1933". On 16 March 2018, Turner released the first official single from the album, "Blackout".

Be More Kind was recorded at Niles City Sound in Fort Worth, Texas, and was released worldwide on 4 May 2018.

On 2 June 2018, Turner re-released his second album, Love Ire & Song, as a tenth anniversary edition. The re-released album was issued on CD and vinyl and consisted of two discs, the first being the original album and the second including demos and recordings of radio performances on the BBC Radio 1 Zane Lowe show. The release also included a download link for Turner's performance at the Social, Nottingham, on 12 April 2008.

=== 2019–2020: Try This at Home and No Man's Land ===
On 24 January 2019, Turner released the Don't Worry EP, the title track of which was previously included on his 2018 album, Be More Kind. A reworked version of "Little Changes" was included, together with two new songs.

Turner published his sophomore book Try This at Home: Adventures in Songwriting on 21 March 2019. Again published through Headline Publishing Group, the book focuses on the stories surrounding various songs throughout his career, starting with some of his earliest songs and continuing all the way through to his most recent material. Turner supported the release of the book with a series of in store signings and solo shows.

On 8 March 2019, at a show in Lisbon, Portugal, Turner debuted a new song entitled "I Believed You William Blake". This song was revealed to be part of Turner's upcoming eighth studio album when he debuted the entire tracklist at a later show in Boston on 15 May 2019.

Turner contributed vocals to the song "Let 'Em Go" by the Wildhearts on the album Renaissance Men, released on 3 May 2019. Turner has made many live appearances with the Wildhearts, has publicly spoken of his love of the band and friendship with Ginger Wildheart.

On 31 May 2019, Turner re-released his third album, Poetry of the Deed, as a tenth anniversary edition. The re-released album was issued on CD and vinyl and consisted of two discs, the first being the original album and the second including several album demos. The release also included a download link for Turner's intimate performance at Union Chapel, Islington on 19 December 2009.

Turner announced his new album, No Man's Land, across his social media on 26 June 2019. He revealed the album name, as well as the concept and theme of the album, which focuses on and celebrates the life and stories of historical women. He also announced a companion podcast to the album, titled Tales from No Man's Land. Each episode of the podcast goes into more detail about the album and the stories behind each of the songs. The podcast also features guest musicians. No Man's Land was released worldwide on 16 August 2019. On 9 August 2019 Turner and his band were the main act for Friday evening at Fairport's Cropredy Convention in Cropredy, near Banbury.

The album's lead single, "Sister Rosetta", and its accompanying podcast episode were released on 3 July 2019. The song's lyrics tell the story of gospel singer-songwriter and guitarist Sister Rosetta Tharpe, who heavily influenced later rock-and-roll musicians such as Chuck Berry, Elvis Presley and Johnny Cash. For the song's podcast episode, Turner hosted alongside fellow musician Emily Barker (who had also written a song about Tharpe) and discussed her legacy.

Turner promoted No Man's Land with a run of nine shows across the UK, starting at the Alhambra Theatre, Dunfermline, on 22 November 2019 and finishing at Alexandra Palace, London, on 3 December 2019. These differed from Turner's typical performances: all venues were seated, and the shows were split into two distinct sets. The first set was a solo set that saw Turner playing songs from No Man's Land and telling the stories behind the songs and the historical women about whom they were written. The second part of the show saw Turner play with the full band, but the production was more stripped-back and thoughtful than a usual Turner set. The recording of his show at City Hall in Newcastle on 27 November 2019 was released as a live album on 24 April 2020. Due to the COVID-19 pandemic of 2020, it was only released digitally.

On 13 December 2019, Turner released a live recording of his 2000th show. The release was issued on CD and DVD and documented his performance at Rock City, Nottingham, on 15 December 2016. The DVD tracklisting includes a version of the classic Motörhead track "Ace of Spades".

On 31 July 2020, West Coast vs. Wessex, a split album with Los Angeles band NOFX, was released on Fat Wreck Chords. The ten-track album saw each act cover five songs from each other's discography.

On 13 November 2020, Turner released Buddies II: Still Buddies, a follow-up to 2010's Buddies EP. The ten-track album saw Turner once again team up with friend Jon Snodgrass. As with the 2010 original, the album was written in one day; however, this time the writing and recording process had to take place remotely due to the COVID-19 pandemic of 2020. Buddies II is the first album that Turner recorded, mixed and mastered on his own.

=== 2021–2025: FTHC, Undefeated and The Next Ten Years ===
On 8 April 2021, Turner hosted a show with long-term friend Emily Barker which was streamed live from the Tunbridge Wells Forum. The show, entitled 'Barker-Turner Overdrive' (a play on the name of the band Bachman-Turner Overdrive) saw Turner and Barker play classic duet songs from country and pop artists. The set also included a new song, "Bound For Home", which Turner and Barker wrote together and later released as a single on 14 May 2021.

On 6 May 2021, Turner released a new track, "The Gathering", a song about people coming back together following the COVID-19 pandemic and lockdown of 2020. The track features Muse drummer Dominic Howard, and Jason Isbell on guitar.

On 4 June 2021, Turner re-released his fourth album, England Keep My Bones, as a tenth-anniversary edition. The re-released album was issued on coloured vinyl and consisted of two discs: the first being the original album, and the second including never-before-heard session demos recorded in El Paso. The release also included a download link for exclusive album demos recorded at Blacksmith Studios, Portsmouth.

On 19 June, whilst also simultaneously playing live in Bideford, Turner appeared (as part of pre-recorded segments) on Scott Doonican's Big Neet in, a lockdown livestream YouTube show, hosted by the lead singer of Barnsley-based comedy band The Bar-Steward Sons of Val Doonican. He was interviewed by a blue-haired Scottish puppet journalist called Gloria McGlumpher and performed a version of his own song "The Road", which featured a combination of his own original lyrics and parody lyrics written by Scott Doonican when his band celebrated their 1000th show a year earlier. During the interview, Turner described it as "the best interview I've ever done".

Turner released a new single called "Haven't Been Doing So Well" on 16 September 2021. This was followed by the release of FTHC, his ninth studio album, on 11 February 2022. The album went straight to number 1 in the official UK album chart, the first time Turner had reached the number 1 spot. Turner and The Sleeping Souls were due to embark on a tour entitled "The Never Ending Tour of Everywhere" starting in January 2022. However, rising COVID-19 cases in the UK following the emergence of the Omicron variant lead to the tour being cancelled in December 2021 due to health concerns for the crew and audience.

On 19 August 2022, he and his friend Chris Blake, who produces music under the name Palest Boy at School, released an album as Eating Before Swimming entitled Playtime with Christopher and Francis Volume 1.

Turner broke the first Music Venue Trust world record in May 2024 when he played 15 gigs in 24 hours, each in a different UK town or city. A share of the proceeds from these shows was donated to the Music Venue Trust. The attempt was undermined by the band Crywank who did an unofficial run of 16 shows in 16 cities in 24 hours the day before, but their attempt was not recognised by any official awarding bodies. The Guinness World Record group have verified Turner's attempt.

Turner released his tenth studio album, Undefeated, on 3 May 2024. The album was recorded at Turner's home studio and was his first album to be entirely self-produced. The album was also the first to feature Sleeping Souls drummer, Callum Green, who joined the band in 2020, following Nigel Powell's departure. On the album's accompanying tour, Turner celebrated his 3000th show on 22 February 2025, with a performance at the 10,000 capacity Alexandra Palace in London.

On 7 November 2025, Turner released a compilation of b-sides, rarities, covers and acoustic versions called The Next Ten Years, which acts as a follow up to Ten for Ten and is his fifth such compilation. The compilation was released digitally and as a triple LP.

=== 2026–present: Indefinite hiatus and final shows ===
On 28 September 2026, Turner announced that he was planning on retiring from performing for the foreseeable future, with the tenth edition of his festival, Lost Evenings, set to be his last. His final shows will take place at Wembley Arena between November 4–7, 2027.

== Lost Evenings Festival ==
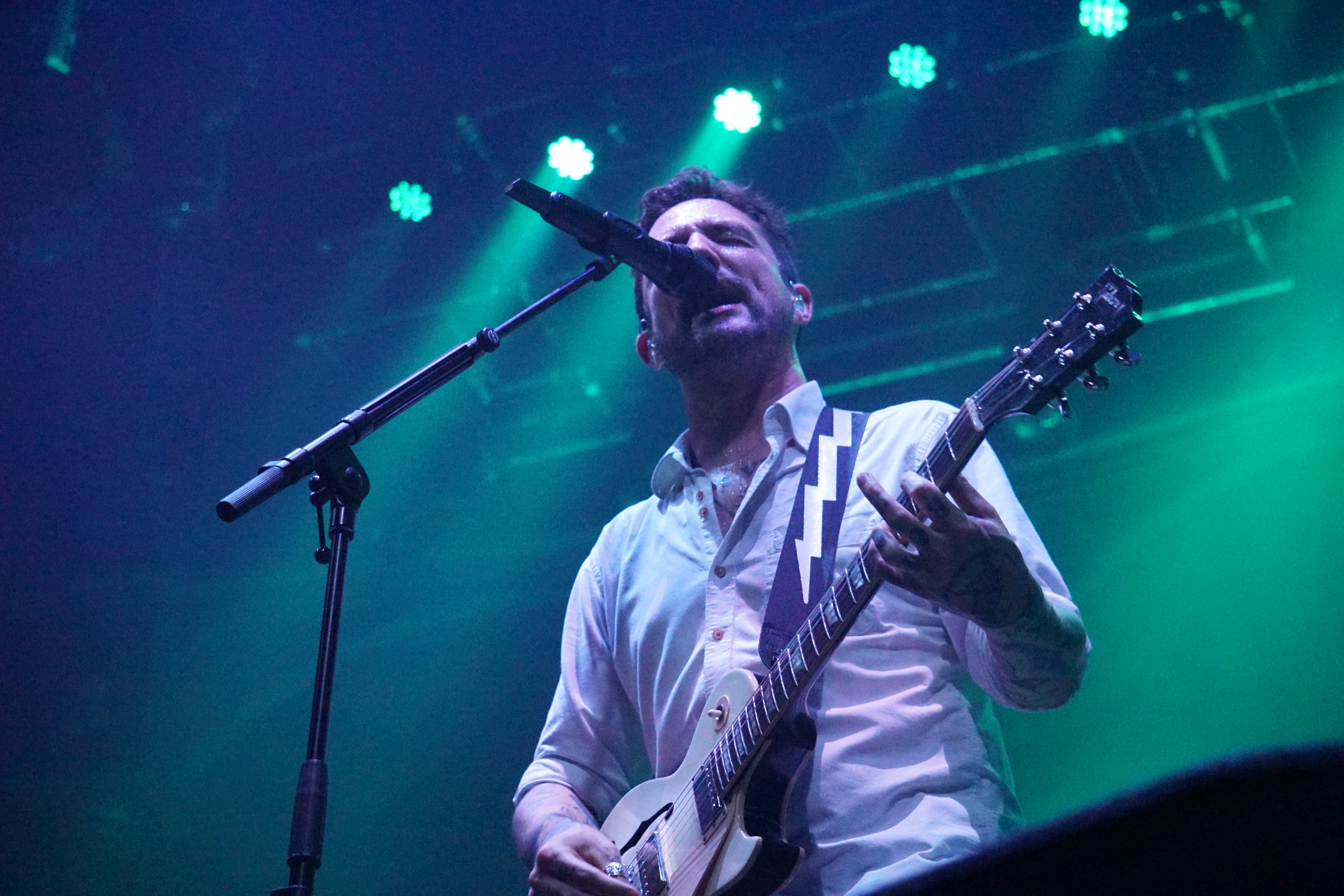
Frank Turner at Lost Evenings IV, at The Roundhouse, Camden. 19 September 2021. Photo by TrueStyleMusic.

Lost Evenings is Frank Turner's annual 4-day music festival which ran 10 times from 2017 to 2027. Named 'Lost Evenings', the festival was announced as a 4-day festival celebrating live music and community. Each year Frank performed as the headliner all four nights, with up to 6 different bands playing each day across two stages.

The first Lost Evenings took place on 12–15 May 2017 at iconic Camden music venue, the Roundhouse. Turner headlined four consecutive concerts on the main stage: Last Minutes and Lost Evenings, Sleep Is For The Week (a full run-through of his debut album, Sleep Is for the Week, released 10 years prior), Sensible Sundays and Greatest Hits. Also on the main stage were AJJ, Seth Lakeman, Scott Hutchinson, Skinny Lister, New Pagas, Deux Furieuses, Beans On Toast and Will Varley.

The 'Nick Alexander Stage' hosted emerging acts all handpicked by Turner and Radio X DJ, John Kennedy. This stage was named after Turner's long-term friend and merchandise manager, who was killed in the Bataclan attack in 2015. On the Nick Alexander stage were Crows, Young Romance, Louis Distress, Ben Marwood, Bloody Knees, Bless, Lewis Bootle, Ducking Punches, Moses, Guise, Uri Sade and Non Canon.

In addition to the evening performances, OneFest (a UK-based, non-profit, music industry development company set up to support the emergence of new talent) ran events and panels during the day.

In September 2017, Turner and Lost Evenings won the Best Independent Festival Award at the AIM Independent Music Awards run by the Association of Independent Music.

Turner returned to the Roundhouse for the second Lost Evenings festival which took place on 11–14 May 2018. Turner once again headlines all four nights: New And Old, Love Ire & Song (a full performance of Love Ire & Song for its 10th anniversary), Sensible Sundays (Solo Acoustic), and Greatest Hits. Also on the main stage were Arakells, The Subways, Ginger Wildheart, Get Cape Wear Cape Day, The Homeless Gospel Choir, Emily Barker, Sarah Walk and Sean McGowan. A significantly expanded Nick Alexander Stage included: Felix Hagan & The Family, Holy Moly & The Crackers, Gabi Garbutt & The Illuminations, Beckie Margaret, Jerry Williams, Saachi Sen, Stick In The Wheel, The Pearl Harts, The Tuts, Shea, Joe Winter, Riah, The Purple Lights, PD Liddle, Xylaroo, Joe McCorriston, The RPMs, Rob Lynch, and The Lion and The Wolf.

Lost Evenings III moved away from London in 2019 and took place at the House of Blues, Boston, on 16–19 May 2019. Turner's four sets were: Acoustic Night, Poetry of the Deed (10th Anniversary Performance), World Tour Set from the Be More Kind World Tour and Greatest Hits. On the main stage were Loudon Wainwright III, The Hold Steady, John K. Sampson, and Against Me!, with Hayley Thompson King, Jenny Owen Youngs, The Architects, Cory Branan, War On Women, AJJ, Trapper Schoepp, and Skinny Lister. On the Nick Alexander Stage were: Amanda Rose Riley, Paul Luck, Jinty McGrath, Micah Schnabel, Owen McMahon, Kayleigh Goldsworthy, The Typical Johnsons, The Penske File, Sean Tobin, Ryan Van Slotted, Rob Moir and Rebuilder.

Lost Evenings IV was scheduled to take place at the Arena, Berlin on 21–24 May 2020. It was originally due to take place at Astra Kulturhaus, but tickets sold out quickly due to high demand, therefore the venue was changed. Artists scheduled to also play the main stage included Catfish and the Bottlemen and KT Tunstall. However, as a consequence of the COVID-19 pandemic of 2020, the festival was cancelled.

Following the cancellation of the Berlin edition due to COVID-19, the new date for Lost Evenings IV was once more announced to be held at the Roundhouse, this time on 16–19 September 2021. Turner's sets were: Acoustic Duo with Matt Nasir, The First Three Albums (plus new songs), England Keep My Bones (10th Anniversary) and Greatest Hits. On the main stage were Gracie Petrie, Jamie Lenman, Nova Twins, Skinny Lister, with Emily Barker, Pet Needs, Lottery Winners and Guise. On the Nick Alexander Stage were Holy Moly & The Crackers, The Meffs, Jess Silk, New Pagans, False Heads, Misery Guts, Dream Nails, Morning Crush, Wildwood Boys, Semantics, Deux Furieuses and BERRIES.

Lost Evenings V took place between 15 and 18 September 2022 in the area known as the "Columbia Triangle" in Berlin, consisting of Columbia Hall, Columbia Theater, and Silverwings. Turner's sets were: Acoustic Duo, Love Ire & Bones, FTHC X, Greatest Hits. On the main stage at Columbiahalle were Beans on Toast, David Hause, Thees Uhlmann, Turbostat, Gracie Petrie, Fortuna Ehrenfeld, Pet Needs and Craig Finn & The Uptown Controllers. On the NA Stage at The Columbia Theater were Tim Vandal, Boris Pelekh, Sean McGowan, Speilbergs, Guise, Gab De La Vega and the Open Cages, The Shabs, Tensheds, Joyce November, March, Berries, Bandaid Brigade, Billy Liar and Grundhass.

Lost Evenings VI took place between 21 and 24 September 2023 at House of Blues, Anaheim, California. Turner's sets were: Acoustic Duo,The First Four Albums, Tape Deck Heart (10th Anniversary) and Greatest Hits. On the main stage were KT Tunstall, Bad Cop Bad Cop, Pedro the Lion, Destroy Boys, Micah Schnabel, Codefendents, Chuck Ragan and Koo Koo. On the NA Stage were Black Guy Fawkes, Jen Razavi, Tommy and June, Divided Heaven, Beyond the Lamplight, Beans on Toast, Ralph, Rebuilder, and The Last Gang.

Lost Evenings VII was held between 19 and 22 September 2024 at the Great Canadian Resort Toronto in Toronto, Ontario, Canada. Turner's sets were Acoustic Duo, Losing Days, Hard Core, and Greatest Hits. On the main stage were Henry Rollins (spoken word), Nobro, The Dirty Nil, Bedouin Soundclash, Martha Wainwright, Northcote, The Obgms, and Murder by Death, with Koo Koo acting as MCs. On the NA stage was Chuck Coles, The Honest Heart Collective, Thunder Queens, The Shackletons, The Sleeping Souls, Delvyn Grey, The Wilderness, Redfox, Guilhem, Shawn Van De Peppel, Hanna Rose Platt and Tom Jenkins.

Lost Evenings VII generated $76,000 for various charities, such as local LGBTQ+ groups, homelessness and housing groups, the Nick Alexander Memorial Trust and more.

Lost Evenings VII was held 25–28 September 2025, in Edinburgh, Scotland. Turner's sets were Back In The Day, Acoustic Duo, Positive Songs for Negative People (10th Anniversary) and Greatest Hits. On the main stage were Havier, Nina Nesbitt, Skinny Lister, Arab Strap, Koo Koo, Chris T-T, Uninvited and Billy Liar. On the NA stage were Deux Furieuses, John Smith, Dictator, Beans on Toast, Ben Brown, Katacombs, Laura Silverstone, Nokomis, Midnight Ambulance, Waverley, Sean R McLaughlin & The Wind-up Crows, and Scrounge.

Lost Evenings XI was held 24–27 September 2026 in Dallas, Texas at the South Side Ballroom. Tuner's sets were The First Ten Years, Campfire Punkrock, The Next Ten Years and Greatest Hits. Top-line openers included The Menzingers, Ben Kweller, The Get-Up Kids and ...And You Will Know Us By The Trail of Dead. Additional bands on the main stage were Hot Water Music, Koo Koo, Laura Stevenson, Chris Simpson (of Mineral), Vandoliers, The Iron Roses, Larry and His Flask, and Emile Wolfe. On the NA stage were Micah Schnabel & Venessa Jean Speckman, Dolores, Stay Gone, Jim Ward, Black Guy Fawkes, Katacombs, Possessed by Paul James, Parker Woodland, Jake Conder, Ultabomb, Girl in a Coma and Yotzam Ben Horin.

Lost Evenings X will be held at Wembley Arena from the 4–7 November 2027 with other acts yet to be announced. It will be the final installment of the festival and Frank's last show before his indefinite hiatus.

== Independent Venue Love ==
During the COVID-19 pandemic of 2020, Turner performed a weekly show from his own home on his Facebook and YouTube channels to raise money for independent grassroots music venues that were forced to temporarily close due to the pandemic.

Talking about the online shows, Turner told NME:

I'm very wary of telling people what to do in general, but one of the things I want to say to other artists is that this is fun. There are benefits to me in that it keeps people talking and if you can get 8,000–10,000 people tuning into you playing in your front room, then why not? You're not losing out by doing something like this. There's endless time at the moment and it's so easy to do. I'm somewhat of a technophobe but I literally put my laptop on a pile of books, press one button to make this work and that's it. None of us would have a career without these venues existing. None of us would have the music we love, so pay something back.

Turner played one of his albums in full on each of the livestreams, and save for one exception, did not repeat one song during all the online shows. The one exception was the song "Silent Key", which appears on both Positive Songs for Negative People and No Man's Land. As well as the full album shows, he also played a couple of covers sets, including a set of songs that appear in Disney films and one set featuring songs by his good friends.

Turner played a total of 21 'Independent Venue' shows and 2 other shows which were specifically to raise money for his band and touring crew and his publishing label, Xtra Mile Recordings. All but one show, Independent Venue Love 13, took place at Turner's home. The 13th show was streamed live from the Clapham Grand, where he was joined by Billy Bragg and Beans On Toast. Turner raised in excess of £260,000 across the 23 shows.

Speaking about the human impact of losing venues, Turner said:

Running a small venue is a business model that runs on small margins, generally from month-to-month or week-to-week and the current closures puts them in very immediate danger – threatening longterm and deeply profound damage to the scene as a whole. Underground music and culture cannot exist unless it has somewhere to exist. There are acts like me, Biffy Clyro, Ed Sheeran and Adele who needed time to incubate, find their voice, develop and grow – and we couldn't have done that without these places existing. But it's not just about incubating future stars, there are tonnes of bands who only exist in small grassroots venues and only ever will. They're still absolutely valid, and if they don't have a place to perform their art then they can't do it. They just won't exist anymore.

== Beliefs ==
Turner has described himself as a "classical liberal" and a "centrist". His song "Sons of Liberty" was inspired by the philosophies of Adam Smith and Karl Popper. Turner was formerly an anarchist in his 20s and said in an interview with the New Statesman "my adolescent politics were all about anarchism and destroying things, the destruction of everything." He has a tattoo of ama-gi, Sumerian cuneiform for "freedom", on his left forearm. Turner received death threats following a news article from The Guardian which quoted him describing himself as a libertarian, referring to socialism as "retarded", and believing that "leftist politics lead to the misery of many." In a subsequent Guardian interview, Turner clarified his views: "The non-Marxist British left is a fantastic tradition: it's all about non-conformism and voluntarism. The advances of the unions are great advances in human society." He condemned the "repugnant" British National Party for being "socially rightwing/racist" and having "authoritarian leftwing" economic policies.

In 2013, Turner became a patron of the assisted dying campaign group Dignity in Dying. In 2016, he was appointed a patron of Humanists UK (formerly the British Humanist Association), which campaigns on a number of ethical and secularist issues, including assisted dying.

Turner is atheist. His 2011 song "Glory Hallelujah" contains a chorus of "There is no God, no heaven and no hell." Regarding others' beliefs, he said "To the extent that other people leave me alone, I’m perfectly content for people to be as religious as they wish to be."

Turner is a friend of Billy Bragg. In 2013, the pair busked together to raise money for the homelessness charity Shelter.

In a 2024 interview with The Freethinker, Turner stated that he does not believe in the supernatural and identifies with a broadly humanist outlook, describing nature as "super enough" without religious explanations.

== Personal life ==
Turner married actress and musician Jessica Guise on 30 August 2019. He frequently collaborates with her and her band Guise, who release music through Xtra Mile Recordings. On 17 September 2024, Guise posted to Instagram that their marriage was over following "Frank's actions on his US tour in June". In October 2025, Turner addressed their split and his new relationship, commenting that he "didn’t set out to inflict pain" but he met his new "soulmate" even if the "timing and context was not perfect."

Turner has cited The Weakerthans, Bruce Springsteen, Black Flag, NOFX, Descendents, Counting Crows, Nirvana, The Clash and Johnny Cash as musical influences. Through his music, Turner has discussed several personal themes, including heartbreak, aging, the difficulties of touring, marriage, mental health difficulties, grief and substance misuse. Turner talked openly about his struggles with anxiety and cocaine addiction during the release cycle for FTHC.

In the past, Turner was straight edge for five years, and was vegetarian for 11 years.

== Backing band ==
Turner's band, The Sleeping Souls, (named after a lyric from "I Am Disappeared") consists of:

Current members

- Ben Lloyd – guitar, harmonica, mandolin, backing vocals (2006–present)
- Tarrant Anderson – bass, backing vocals (2006–present)
- Matt Nasir – piano, organ, guitar, mandolin, harmonica, auxiliary percussion, backing vocals (2009–present)
- Callum Green – drums, percussion, backing vocals (2020–present)

Former members

- Nigel Powell – drums, percussion, backing vocals (2006–2020)

Touring musicians and substitutes

- Cahir O'Doherty – guitar, backing vocals (2013–2014; substitute for Turner; 2021, substitute for Ben Lloyd), bass (2019; substitute for Tarrant Anderson)
- Dan Allen – guitar, backing vocals (2013, European Tour)
- Felix Hagan – piano, backing vocals (2017, North American tour)

Timeline

== Discography ==
=== Solo ===
- Sleep Is for the Week (2007)
- Love Ire & Song (2008)
- Poetry of the Deed (2009)
- England Keep My Bones (2011)
- Tape Deck Heart (2013)
- Positive Songs for Negative People (2015)
- Be More Kind (2018)
- No Man's Land (2019)
- FTHC (2022)
- Undefeated (2024)

=== With Million Dead ===
- A Song to Ruin (2003)
- Harmony No Harmony (2005)

=== With Mïngle Härde ===
- Mïngle Härde (2014)

=== With NOFX ===
- West Coast VS Wessex (2020)

=== With Eating Before Swimming ===
- Playtime with Christopher and Francis Volume 1 (2022)

== Videography ==
=== Music videos ===
- "Casanova Lament" (unaired)
- "Vital Signs" (2006)
- "The Real Damage" (2007)
- "Photosynthesis" (2008)
- "Reasons Not to Be an Idiot" (2008)
- "I Knew Prufrock Before He Got Famous" (2008)
- "Long Live the Queen" (2008)
- "The Road" (2009)
- "Poetry of the Deed" (2009)
- "Isabel" (2010)
- "Try This at Home" (2010)
- "I Still Believe" (2010)
- "Peggy Sang the Blues" (2011)
- "If Ever I Stray" (2011)
- "Sailor's Boots" (2011)
- "Wessex Boy" (2011)
- "Four Simple Words" (2012)
- "Recovery" (2013)
- "The Way I Tend To Be" (2013)
- "Losing Days" (2013)
- "Polaroid Picture" (2013)
- "Oh Brother" (2013)
- "Get Better" (2015)
- "The Next Storm" (2015)
- "Josephine" (2015)
- "Mittens" (2016)
- "Love Forty Down" (2016)
- "There She Is" (2017)
- "Blackout" (2018)
- "Make America Great Again" (2018)
- "Little Changes" (2018)
- "The Road" (2021) collaboration with The Bar-Steward Sons of Val Doonican
- "The Girl from the Record Shop" (2024)

=== DVDs ===
- All About the Destination (22 October 2007)
- Take to the Road (22 March 2010)
- Frank Turner Live From Wembley (October 2012)
- "Get Better" (30 June 2017)

== Bibliography ==
- The Road Beneath My Feet (ISBN 978-1472222015; 2015)
- Try This at Home: Adventures in Songwriting (ISBN 978-1472257857; 2019)

== Awards and nominations ==
Frank Turner awards and nominations
Awards and nominations
Award	Wins	Nominations
NME	0	4
Kerrang! Awards	1	1
Bandit Rock Awards	0	1
AIM	2	4

Totals (Note: Certain award groups do not simply award one winner. They acknowledge several different recipients, have runners-up, and have third place. Since this is a specific recognition and is different from losing an award, runner-up mentions are considered wins in this award tally. For simplification and to avoid errors, each award in this list has been presumed to have had a prior nomination.)
- Wins: 3
- Nominations: 10

	Category	Result
Kerrang Awards 2010	No Half Measures Award	Won
Shockwaves NME Awards 2011	Best Solo Artist	Nominated
Shockwaves NME Awards 2011	Best Band Blog or Twitter	Nominated
Shockwaves NME Awards 2012	Best Solo Artist	Nominated
Shockwaves NME Awards 2012	Best Band Blog or Twitter	Nominated
Bandit Rock Awards 2011	Best International Breakthrough	Nominated
AIM Awards 2011	Best Live Act	Won
AIM Awards 2011	Hardest Working Artist	Won
AIM Awards 2012	Best Live Act	Nominated
AIM Awards 2012	Hardest Working Artist	Nominated
