= Sleep Is for the Week =

Studio album by Frank Turner
- Released: 15 January 2007
- Recorded: August – September 2006
- Studio: Tarrant Anderson's house, Oxford, England
- Genre: Folk punk, folk rock
- Length: 47:10
- Label: Xtra Mile
- Producer: Ben Lloyd, Frank Turner

Frank Turner chronology
Campfire Punkrock (2006)	Sleep Is for the Week (2007)	The Real Damage (2007)

Sleep Is for the Week is the debut studio album by the English singer-songwriter Frank Turner, released on 15 January 2007 on Xtra Mile Recordings. The album was produced by Turner's guitarist Ben Lloyd, and recorded between August and September 2006 at the Oxford home of Turner's bass guitarist Tarrant Anderson. Drummer Nigel Powell appears throughout the album, with Lloyd, Anderson and Powell all going on to become Turner's regular backing band, later named the Sleeping Souls.

In a 2008 interview, Turner described the album as "a snapshot of pretty much exactly one year of my life". The album's artwork was created by Chris Pell.

== Reception and legacy ==
Professional ratings
Review scores
Source	Rating
Allmusic	3/5 stars
Rockmidgets.com	4/5 stars
Rocklouder	4/5 stars
Punknews.org	4/5 stars

Upon its release, the album received a largely positive reception from critics.

In a 2024 interview, Turner reflected on the album stating: "I’m very fond of this record, in a kind of head-patting way, but that’s not quite the same as thinking it’s amazing. I was working out what I was doing on this album, you can hear it in the songs. It’s rough and ready, it’s occasionally uncertain. But it hits the mark more than it misses, I think, and there’s a kind of innocence in your first round of writing that you can’t get back. It got tepid reviews when it came out; I’m still playing large chunks of it live 17 years (and counting) later. I win."

== 10th anniversary release ==
On 27 January 2017, Xtra Mile released the 10th anniversary editions of Sleep is for the Week. This included an Xrta Mile exclusive lilac 12", a Banquet Records exclusive gold 12" limited to 500 copies, and a standard black 12".

== Track listing ==
All tracks are written by Frank Turner.

No.	Title	Length
1.	"The Real Damage"	3:35
2.	"Vital Signs"	3:38
3.	"Romantic Fatigue"	2:57
4.	"A Decent Cup of Tea"	3:09
5.	"Father's Day"	4:50
6.	"Worse Things Happen at Sea"	3:43
7.	"My Kingdom for a Horse"	4:52
8.	"Back in the Day"	2:06
9.	"Once We Were Anarchists"	3:50
10.	"Wisdom Teeth"	4:17
11.	"The Ladies of London Town" (Featuring Jamie Lenman)	4:06
12.	"Must Try Harder"	3:35
13.	"The Ballad of Me and My Friends" (Live recording at the Camden Barfly 8 August 2006)	2:33
Total length:		47:10

== Singles/B-sides ==
- "Vital Signs" (b-side "Heartless Bastard Motherfucker"), 25 December 2006 (Download Only)

== Personnel ==
- Frank Turner - vocals, guitar, bass, banjo, laúd, keyboards
- Nigel Powell - drums, percussion, keyboards, backing vocals
- Rachel Birkin - violin
- Jo Silverston - cello
