= Love Ire & Song =

Studio album by Frank Turner
- Released: 31 March 2008
- Genres: Folk punk, folk rock
- Length: 45:51
- Label: Xtra Mile/Epitaph
- Producers: Ben Lloyd, Frank Turner

Frank Turner chronology
The Real Damage (2007)	Love Ire & Song (2008)	The First Three Years (2008)

Love Ire & Song is the second studio album by English singer-songwriter Frank Turner, released on 31 March 2008 by Xtra Mile Recordings. On 26 January 2009, the album was re-released as a deluxe version, including the First Three Years compilation album. Love Ire & Song was re-released on 21 July 2009 through Epitaph Records, where Frank Turner had recently signed to.

In October 2008, Turner released the track "Long Live the Queen" as a benefit single for the Breast Cancer Campaign, in honour of a close friend who succumbed to the disease.

== Production ==
Love Ire & Song was entirely written by Turner, and recorded on a farm near Turner's home-town of Winchester. It was co-produced by Turner and guitarist Ben Lloyd, who also contributed electric guitar and harmonica performances. Turner's live drummer Nigel Powell provided percussion and keyboard performances on the album. London indie band The Holloways provided backing vocals on "Photosynthesis".

== Album Title ==
In an interview, Turner summarised the album's title as:

"The three things you need in life to be content. Love, ire – righteous anger – and song, as in, you know, like a guitar and some Gram Parsons tunes."

== Reception ==
Professional ratings
Review scores
Source	Rating
ChartAttack	3.5/5 stars
Kerrang!	4/5 stars
NeuFutur.com	9/10 stars
Punknews.org	4.5/5 stars
Rockmidgets.com	4/5 stars
Stereokill	4.5/5 stars
Allmusic	4/5 stars

The album met with critical acclaim on its release, hailed as a stylistic development on Turner's debut Sleep Is for the Week. Turner himself stated in an interview that the album was "almost a re-statement" of the ideas of Sleep Is for the Week, "but much, much better". Rock Sound ranked it at number 17 on their list of the year's best albums.

== Re-release ==
A re-release of the album was released in 2008, and containing a bonus disc of The First Three Years. The 35-track double album's artwork is based upon Love Ire & Song, except with the subtitle "+ The First Three Years" added as a suffix to the album title. The reverse sleeve is the front cover to The First Three Years.

== Track listing ==
All tracks are written by Frank Turner.

No.	Title	Length
1.	"I Knew Prufrock Before He Got Famous"	3:13
2.	"Reasons Not to Be an Idiot"	3:49
3.	"Photosynthesis"	4:12
4.	"Substitute"	2:46
5.	"Better Half"	5:02
6.	"Love Ire & Song"	4:21
7.	"Imperfect Tense"	2:37
8.	"To Take You Home"	3:49
9.	"Long Live the Queen"	3:27
10.	"A Love Worth Keeping"	4:17
11.	"St Christopher Is Coming Home"	3:10
12.	"Jet Lag"	5:08
Total length:		45:43

== Singles ==
- "Photosynthesis" – 24 March 2008, download only
- "Reasons Not to Be an Idiot" – 23 June 2008
- "Long Live the Queen" – 20 October 2008, charity single

== Music videos ==
- "Photosynthesis"
- "Reasons Not to Be an Idiot"
- "Long Live The Queen"
- "I Knew Prufrock Before He Got Famous"

== Certifications ==
Region	Certification	Certified units/sales
United Kingdom (BPI)	Gold	100,000^{‡}
^{‡} Sales+streaming figures based on certification alone.
