= Ben Lloyd =

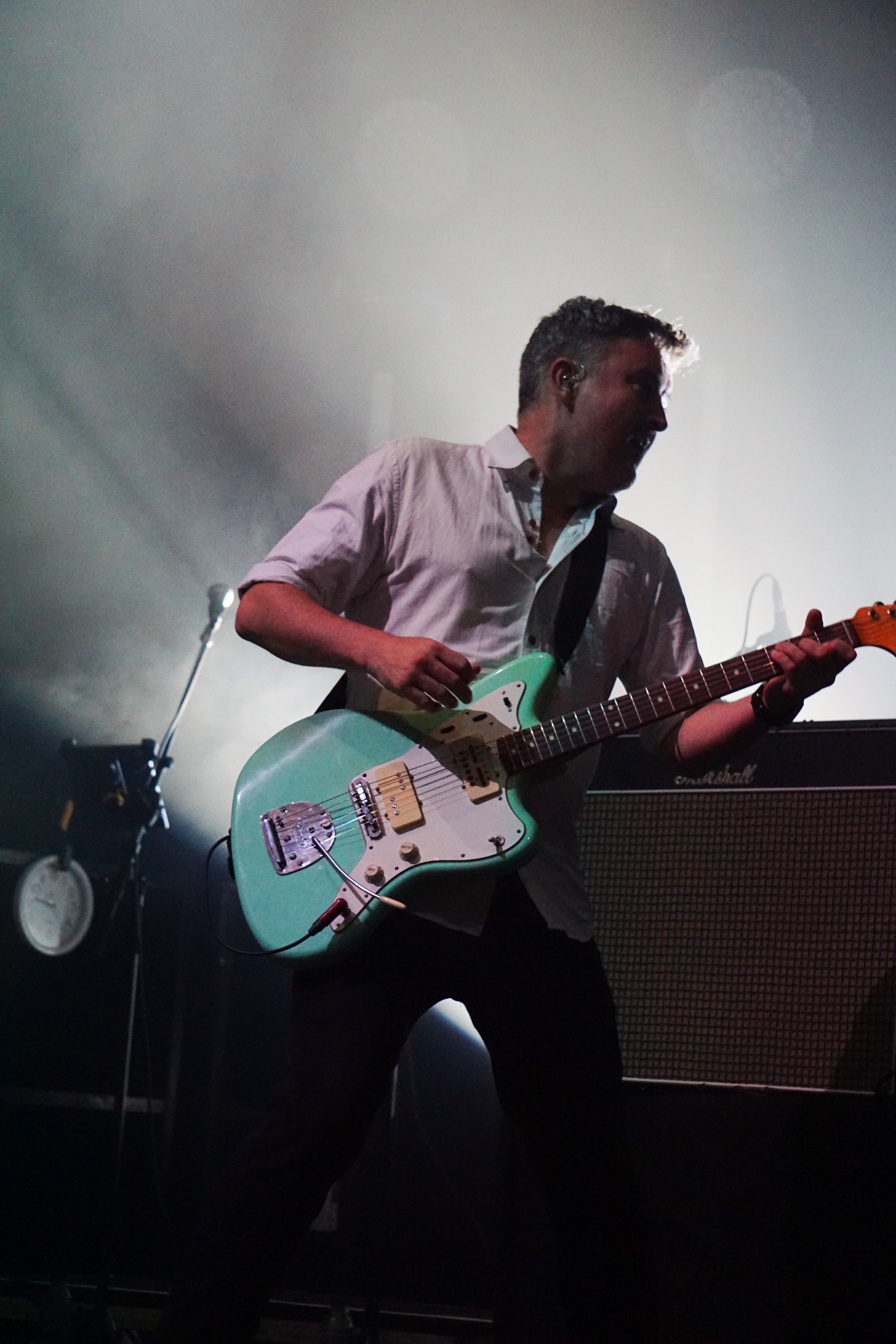
- Lloyd at Lost Evenings 2021, at The Roundhouse Camden, playing with Frank Turner and The Sleeping Souls

Background information
- Origin: Oxford, England
- Occupations: Musician, recording engineer, record producer
- Instrument: Electric guitar

Ben Lloyd is an English musician, record producer and recording engineer based in Oxford, England. He currently plays electric guitar in Frank Turner's band, The Sleeping Souls, and is a member of the British rock band, Dive Dive. He also recorded and produced Frank Turner's first EP Campfire Punkrock (2006) and his first two albums Sleep Is for the Week (2007) and Love Ire & Song (2008). He is endorsed by Laney Amplification and Ernie Ball Strings. Frank Turner and The Sleeping Souls headlined Wembley Arena in April 2012, and played at the Opening Ceremony of the 2012 Olympic Games in London.

== Discography ==
=== As musician ===
==== Studio albums ====
- Tilting at Windmills (2005) Dive Dive
- Revenge of the Mechanical Dog (2007) Dive Dive
- Sleep Is for the Week (2007) Frank Turner
- Love Ire & Song (2008) Frank Turner
- Poetry of the Deed (2009) Frank Turner
- Potential (2011) Dive Dive
- England Keep My Bones (2011) Frank Turner
- Tape Deck Heart (2013) Frank Turner
- Positive Songs for Negative People (2015) Frank Turner
- Be More Kind (2018) Frank Turner

==== EPs ====
- Campfire Punkrock (2006) Frank Turner
- iTunes Festival: London 2010 (2010) Frank Turner
- Rock & Roll (2010) Frank Turner

=== As producer ===
==== Studio albums ====
- Revenge of the Mechanical Dog (2007) Dive Dive
- Sleep Is for the Week (2007) Frank Turner
- Love Ire & Song (2008) Frank Turner
- One Light is Gone (2010) Josienne Clarke
- Potential (2011) Dive Dive
