= The Real Damage =

EP by Frank Turner
- Released: 7 May 2007
- Genre: Folk
- Length: 17:05
- Label: Xtra Mile Recordings

Frank Turner chronology
Sleep Is For The Week (2007)	The Real Damage (2007)	Love Ire & Song (2008)

The Real Damage is the second EP by UK singer-songwriter Frank Turner. It was released via Xtra Mile Recordings on 7 May 2007 and features all newly recorded songs with exception of the title track.

The inner sleeve of the EP features a 'memorial' to Frank's old acoustic guitar that was stolen in Porvoo, Finland in February 2007. Frank wrote that the instrument was "the guitar I'd had for seven years, with which I'd played every solo show, on which I wrote and recorded every solo song".

== Track listing ==
All tracks are written by Frank Turner.

No.	Title	Length
1.	"The Real Damage"	3:37
2.	"Sea Legs"	3:34
3.	"Back to Sleep"	3:44
4.	"Sunshine State"	3:04
5.	"Heartless Bastard Motherfucker"	2:58
