= Poetry of the Deed =

Studio album by Frank Turner
- Released: 7 September 2009
- Recorded: April – May 2009
- Genre: Folk rock
- Length: 47:08
- Label: Xtra Mile/Epitaph
- Producer: Alex Newport

Frank Turner chronology
The First Three Years (2008)	Poetry of the Deed (2009)	Frank Turner / Tim Barry Split (2009)

Professional ratings
Aggregate scores
Source	Rating
Metacritic	73/100
Review scores
Source	Rating
Allmusic	4/5 stars
BBC	(positive)
NME	8/10 stars
Stereokill	4/5 stars

Poetry of the Deed is the third studio album by London-based singer-songwriter Frank Turner, released on 7 September 2009. The album was released on Xtra Mile Recordings in the UK and Epitaph Records worldwide.

Unlike Turner's previous solo albums, Poetry of the Deed was rehearsed, arranged and recorded with his full band. In the album's liner notes, Turner states: "this album has been more of a collaborative process than on previous efforts, so first and foremost thanks are due to Ben Lloyd, Matt Nasir, Tarrant Anderson and Nigel Powell."

== Background ==
After extensive touring behind the release of Love, Ire & Song in 2008, Turner began writing new material, with a few songs ("Live Fast, Die Old" & "Dan's Song") appearing at gigs in late 2008.

Before recording the album, Turner and his band played four gigs in Oxford in order to road-test 14 new songs. Turner kept fans up to date during the writing and recording of the album via his blog.

The album was produced by Alex Newport. Recording took place at Leeders Farm in Norwich and the producer's own Future Shock Studio in Brooklyn, New York City.

The album's first single was "The Road" which received the status as 'Hottest Record in the World Today' by BBC Radio 1's Zane Lowe on 14 July 2009. The title track, "Poetry of the Deed," was released as its second single.

The iTunes deluxe version of the album includes four bonus acoustic tracks along with the music video for "The Road".

== Track listing ==
All tracks are written by Frank Turner.

No.	Title	Length
1.	"Live Fast Die Old"	4:16
2.	"Try This at Home"	1:53
3.	"Dan's Song"	1:57
4.	"Poetry of the Deed"	3:25
5.	"Isabel"	4:06
6.	"The Fastest Way Back Home"	3:26
7.	"Sons of Liberty"	4:28
8.	"The Road"	3:58
9.	"Faithful Son"	3:35
10.	"Richard Divine"	3:49
11.	"Sunday Nights"	4:04
12.	"Our Lady of the Campfires"	3:59
13.	"Journey of the Magi"	4:16
Total length:		47:08

iTunes bonus tracks
No.	Title	Length
14.	"The Road" (Acoustic version)	3:54
15.	"The Fastest Way Back Home" (Acoustic version)	3:33
16.	"Isabel" (Acoustic version)	3:32
17.	"Try This At Home" (Acoustic version)	1:56
18.	"The Road" (Music Video)	4:19

== Personnel ==
=== Musicians ===
- Frank Turner - vocals, acoustic guitar, harmonica
- Ben Lloyd - electric guitar, mandolin, vocals
- Tarrant Anderson - bass guitar
- Matt Nasir - piano, organ, keyboards, vocals
- Nigel Powell - drums, percussion, vocals
- Anna Jenkins - fiddle ("Sons of Liberty")
- Marika Hughes - cello ("Faithful Son", "Our Lady of the Campfires")
- Fergus Coulbeck - accordion ("Sons of Liberty")

=== Recording personnel ===
- Alex Newport - producer, engineer, mixing
- Dean Curtis - studio assistant
- Chris Tabron - mixing assistant
- Frank Arkwright - mastering

=== Artwork ===
- Chris Bourke - lino-cut
- Alex Newport - band photograph
- Graham Smith - solo photograph
- Ben Morse - live band photograph

== Certifications ==
Region	Certification	Certified units/sales
United Kingdom (BPI)	Silver	60,000^{‡}
^{‡} Sales+streaming figures based on certification alone.
