= Matt Nasir =

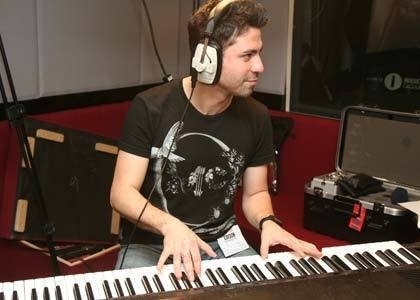

Background information
- Origin: London, England
- Occupation: Multi-instrumental musician
- Instrument(s): Keyboards, guitar, mandolin

Matt Nasir is an English multi-instrumental musician, based in London, England. He currently plays keyboards in Frank Turner's band The Sleeping Souls and is a member of the London-based rock band, The Pressure Room. He has also previously played in Andy Yorke's live band and is known as the 'Archivist' for his remixing work. Frank Turner and The Sleeping Souls headlined Wembley Arena in April 2012 and played at the Opening Ceremony of the 2012 Olympic Games in London. Nasir also features as the guitarist in a side-project, Mïngle Härde, with Frank Turner and Frank's former Million Dead bandmate, Ben Dawson. Nasir plays a baritone guitar in Mïngle Härde.

== Discography ==
=== Studio albums ===
- Poetry of the Deed (2009) - Frank Turner
- Wide of the Mark (2010) - The Pressure Room
- England Keep My Bones (2011) - Frank Turner
- Tape Deck Heart (2013) - Frank Turner
- Möngöl Hörde (2014) - Mïngle Härde
- Positive Songs for Negative People (2015) - Frank Turner
- The Irish Departure (2017)
- Be More Kind (2018) - Frank Turner
- FTHC (2022) - Frank Turner

=== EPs ===
- iTunes Festival: London 2010 (2010) Frank Turner
- Rock & Roll (2010) Frank Turner

== Singles ==
- "The Road" (2009) Frank Turner
- "Poetry of the Deed" (2009) Frank Turner
- "Isabel"' (2009) Frank Turner
- "Try this at Home" (2010) Frank Turner
- "I Still Believe" (2010) Frank Turner
