= The Second Three Years =

Compilation album by Frank Turner
- Released: 18 November 2011
- Recorded: 2009–2011
- Genre: Folk rock
- Label: Xtra Mile/Epitaph

Frank Turner chronology
| England Keep My Bones (2011) | The Second Three Years (2011) | Tape Deck Heart (2013) |

The Second Three Years is a compilation album by singer-songwriter Frank Turner, released 18 November 2011 through Xtra Mile Recordings and 16 January 2012 through Epitaph Records.

The album compiles material recorded after the release of Turner's first compilation, The First Three Years, that does not appear on either of Turner's two successive studio albums, including tracks from EPs, singles, covers and unreleased material.

== Track listing ==
All tracks are written by Frank Turner except where noted

| No. | Title | Originally appeared on | Length |
|---|---|---|---|
| 1. | "Sailor's Boots" | If Ever I Stray (iTunes download b-side) | 1:57 |
| 2. | "Pass It Along" | Rock & Roll EP | 4:07 |
| 3. | "Rock & Roll Romance" | Rock & Roll EP | 1:51 |
| 4. | "To Absent Friends" | Rock & Roll EP | 2:59 |
| 5. | "The Next Round" | Rock & Roll EP | 4:39 |
| 6. | "Song for Eva Mae" | England Keep My Bones (Deluxe Edition) | 3:45 |
| 7. | "Wanderlust" | England Keep My Bones (Deluxe Edition) | 3:15 |
| 8. | "Balthazar, Impresario" | England Keep My Bones (Deluxe Edition) | 4:00 |
| 9. | "Mr Richards" | The Road (iTunes download) | 4:00 |
| 10. | "Song To Bob" (Bob Dylan adaptation) | BBC Radio 1 Session (October 2009) | 2:56 |
| 11. | "Thunder Road" (Bruce Springsteen cover) | Under the Influence Vol. 8 | 4:29 |
| 12. | "Sally" (Kerbdog cover) | Pledge: A Tribute to Kerbdog | 4:40 |
| 13. | "Barbara Allen" (Traditional) | Take to the Road DVD | 3:08 |
| 14. | "The Quiet One" (Mark Mulcahy cover) | Ciao My Shining Star: The Songs of Mark Mulcahy | 3:43 |
| 15. | "Build Me Up Buttercup" (The Foundations cover) | 1969: Key to Change (download from FairShareMusic.com) | 3:06 |
| 16. | "Linoleum" (NOFX cover) | Previously unreleased | 1:28 |
| 17. | "The Slow Train" (Flanders and Swann cover) | Previously unreleased | 2:28 |
| 18. | "The Greatest Day" (Take That cover) | BBC Radio 1: Live Lounge Session | 3:10 |
| 19. | "My Poor Friend Me" (Bad Religion cover) | Germs Of Perfection: A Tribute To Bad Religion (free download from Spin magazine) | 2:48 |
| 20. | "On a Plain" (Nirvana cover) | Nirvana Nevermind: Forever (from Kerrang magazine) | 2:45 |
| 21. | "Father's Day" | Take to the Road DVD | 6:21 |
| 22. | "Last Christmas" (Wham! cover) | Take to the Road DVD | 4:17 |
