= Dummy Crusher =

Single by Kerbdog

from the album Kerbdog
- Released: July 1994
- Recorded: Summer 1993 at Rockfield Studios, Wales
- Genre: Alternative rock
- Length: 3:19
- Label: Vertigo; VERCD86 / 858 833-2 (CD1); VERDD86 / 858 835-2 (CD2); VERX86 (12" Picture Disc); VER86 (7")
- Songwriters: Cormac Battle; Darragh Butler; Colin Fennelly; Billy Dalton
- Producer: Jack Endino

Kerbdog singles chronology
"Dry Riser" (1994)	"Dummy Crusher" (1994)	"JJ's Song" (1996)

"Dummy Crusher" is a song by Kerbdog and a single released in July 1994, taken from their self titled debut album. The single was released on four different formats, two CDs, 7" vinyl and 12" vinyl. The 12" single was a limited edition picture disc.

Most of the B-sides over the 4 discs are covers. "Kennedy" was originally by The Wedding Present, "Debaser" is a cover of the song by the Pixies from their 1989 album Doolittle, "Mildred Pierce" is a cover of the song by Sonic Youth from their 1990 album Goo, "This Is Not a Love Song" was originally by Public Image Ltd, "Mr. Clean" was originally by The Jam on their 1978 album All Mod Cons, "Don't Stand in Line" is a cover of the song by Pailhead, and "Too Much Too Young" was originally a number-one hit for The Specials in 1980. All b-side tracks recorded by Nick Woolage.

CD2 and the 7" feature the "Kaliphz Mix" of "Dummy Crusher", which is a faster dancier mix with heavy breakbeats. This mix also features on both sides of a 10" green-coloured vinyl promo issued to DJs only. There were also two CD promos. These featured a "Clean Mix" of "Dummy Crusher" which had bad language featured in the lyrics edited out, as this is not considered suitable for daytime radio play. "The Funk Regulators Clean Mix" is the "Kaliphz Mix" edited in the same way.

When played live the band jokingly said that the song was about Battle's Dad's taxi or 'a very famous car'.

"Dummy Crusher" is the only Kerbdog single to have reached the UK's Top 40 singles chart, peaking at number 37.

The "Dummy Crusher" track was featured on the Highlander III: The Sorcerer soundtrack.

== Track listing of CD1 ==
1. "Dummy Crusher"
2. "Kennedy"
3. "Debaser"

== Track listing of CD2 (Digipack) ==
1. "Dummy Crusher (Kaliphz Mix)"
2. "Mildred Pierce"
3. "This Is Not A Love Song"

== Track listing of 12" ==
1. "Dummy Crusher"
2. "Don't Stand In Line"
3. "Mr. Clean"

== Track listing of 7" ==
1. "Dummy Crusher (Kaliphz Mix)"
2. "Too Much Too Young"

== Promos ==
CD DJ promo (US)

1. "Dummy Crusher (Clean Version)"
2. "Dummy Crusher (Album Version)"
3. "Dummy Crusher (Live From Concrete)"
4. "Dummy Crusher (Funk Regulators Clean Mix)"
5. "This Is Not A Love Song"
6. "Debaser"

Green 10" promo (UK)

1. "Dummy Crusher (Kaliphz Mix)"

== Chart performance ==
"Dummy Crusher" entered the UK singles charts on 6 August 1994 and peaked after two weeks.

Chart (1994)	Peak position
UK Music Week Top 75 Singles	37
