= Nigel Powell =

English musician

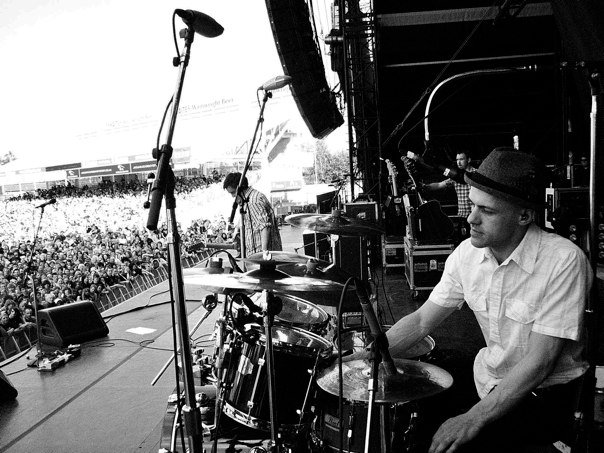
- Nigel Powell playing at Old Trafford Cricket Ground in June 2010.

Background information
- Born: 1 October 1971 (age 55); Bromley, London, England
- Origin: Abingdon, England
- Occupations: Musician, producer
- Instruments: Drums, percussion, piano, guitar, bass guitar, mandolin, keyboards, vocals

Nigel Powell (born 1 October 1971) is an English multi-instrumental musician from Abingdon.

Powell was born in Bromley, London, and educated at Abingdon School. While at school he was in a band called Illiterate Hands, which also featured future Radiohead lead guitarist Jonny Greenwood and Andy Yorke, brother of Thom Yorke.

He is best known as the former drummer for Frank Turner's live and studio backing band; the Sleeping Souls. Nigel is also a member of the Oxford-based alternative rock bands Dive Dive and Unbelievable Truth. He is endorsed by Pro-Mark Sticks and Sabian Cymbals. Frank Turner and the Sleeping Souls headlined at Wembley Arena in April 2012, and played at the Opening Ceremony of the 2012 Olympic Games in London. On October 23, 2020, Powell announced via his social media that his tenure with Frank Turner and the Sleeping Souls was ending, and he would be focusing on his solo project, the Sad Song Co.

== The Sad Song Co. ==
The Sad Song Co. is a solo project of Powell that also features bass player Jason Moulster, begun in 2000 in Oxford.

Powell took the songs he had been writing for Unbelievable Truth and recorded them for the debut the Sad Song Co. album miseryguts, which was released in 2003. Moulster contributed bass throughout.

Following a few years touring with Dive Dive in support of their first two albums Powell recorded his second album Poignant Device. Marillion contributed use of their Racket Studios while they were on tour, and it was completed with George Shilling at his Bank Cottage Studios later that year. By the time of its release in 2007 three quarters of Dive Dive had begun acting as Frank Turner’s backing band on record and on tour, so there was little opportunity for touring, outside of the release show for the album supporting Marillion at their fan weekend in Port Zelande, the Netherlands.

During breaks in touring in 2014 and 2015, Powell wrote and recorded another album titled in amber. After crowdfunding through PledgeMusic, the album was released on 26 August 2016, and he undertook a UK tour in October, between tours with Frank Turner.

Another album entitled Worth was released in 2018.

== Discography – as musician ==
=== Studio albums ===
- Almost Here (1998) – UK No. 21 Unbelievable Truth (Virgin Records)
- sorrythankyou (2000) Unbelievable Truth (Shifty Disco)
- SmileSunset (2001) Mark Mulcahy
- Misc. Music (2001) Unbelievable Truth
- Asianblue (2002) Emm Gryner (percussion on Siamese Star)
- miseryguts (2003) the Sad Song Co.
- Tilting at Windmills (2005) Dive Dive
- The Great Lakes (2005) Emm Gryner (drums on Case of Tornadoes)
- Poignant Device (2007) the Sad Song Co.
- Revenge of the Mechanical Dog (2007) Dive Dive
- Sleep Is for the Week (2007) Frank Turner (Xtra Mile Recordings)
- Simple (2008) Andy Yorke
- Love Ire & Song (2008) – UK No. 72 Frank Turner (Xtra Mile Recordings / Epitaph Records)
- The First Three Years (2008) – UK No. 72 Frank Turner (Xtra Mile Recordings / Epitaph Records)
- Poetry of the Deed (2009) Frank Turner – UK No. 36 Frank Turner (Xtra Mile Recordings / Epitaph Records)
- Ciao My Shining Star: The Songs of Mark Mulcahy (2009) Various Artists (plays and produces tracks by Unbelievable Truth and Frank Turner)
- Memoria : A Tribute to the Alternative 90s (2009) Various Artists (plays and produces on cover of Kerbdog's Sally by Frank Turner)
- One Light Is Gone (2010) Josienne Clarke (drums on 3 tracks)
- Potential (2010) Dive Dive (Xtra Mile Recordings)
- England Keep My Bones (2011) Frank Turner UK No. 12 (Xtra Mile Recordings / Epitaph Records)
- Tape Deck Heart (2013) Frank Turner UK No. 2 (Xtra Mile Recordings / Interscope Records)
- Positive Songs for Negative People (2015) Frank Turner UK No. 2 (Xtra Mile Recordings)
- In Amber (2016) the Sad Song Co.
- Worth (2018) the Sad Song Co.
- Be More Kind (2018) Frank Turner
- Saudade (2021) the Sad Song Co.

=== EPs ===
- Stone – EP (1997) Unbelievable Truth (Virgin Records)
- Higher Than Reason – EP (1998) Unbelievable Truth (Virgin Records)
- Settle Down / Sea Dune – EP (1998) Unbelievable Truth (Virgin Records)
- Solved – EP (1998) Unbelievable Truth (Virgin Records)
- When I Wank on My Guitar the Whole World Wanks With Me (2002) Dustball (Juggernaught Records)
- Sounds All Wrong (2002) Dustball (Juggernaught Records)
- Campfire Punkrock (2006) Frank Turner (Xtra Mile Recordings)
- The Real Damage (2007) Frank Turner (Xtra Mile Recordings)
- Bad Moon Rising (2010) Lazare
- iTunes Festival: London 2010 (2010) Frank Turner
- Rock & Roll (2010) Frank Turner (Xtra Mile Recordings / Epitaph Records)
- Liar (2010) Dive Dive (Xtra Mile Recordings)

=== Singles ===
- Building (1997) Unbelievable Truth (Shifty Disco)
- Higher Than Reason (1998) – UK No. 38 Unbelievable Truth (Virgin Records)
- Solved (1998) – UK No. 39 Unbelievable Truth (Virgin Records)
- Settle Down / "Dune Sea" (1998) – UK No. 46 Unbelievable Truth (Virgin Records)
- Agony (2000) Unbelievable Truth (Shifty Disco)
- Landslide (2000) Unbelievable Truth (Shifty Disco)
- Advice to a Lover (2000) Unbelievable Truth (Shifty Disco)
- Good Show(2004) Dive Dive
- 555 For Film Stars (2005) UK Indie No. 6, UK Chart No. 48 Dive Dive
- The Sorry Suitor (2005) UK Indie No. 10, UK Chart No. 54 Dive Dive
- Vital Signs (2006) Frank Turner (Xtra Mile Recordings)
- The Game (2007) Dive Dive
- Photosynthesis (2008) Frank Turner (Xtra Mile Recordings)
- Reasons Not to Be an Idiot (2008) Frank Turner UK Chart No. 124 (Xtra Mile Recordings)
- Long Live the Queen (2008) Frank Turner UK Chart No. 65 (Xtra Mile Recordings)
- The Road (2009) Frank Turner UK Chart No. 62 (Xtra Mile Recordings / Epitaph Records)
- Poetry of the Deed (2009) Frank Turner (Xtra Mile Recordings / Epitaph Records)
- Isabel (2010) Frank Turner (Xtra Mile Recordings / Epitaph Records)
- Try This at Home (2010) Frank Turner (Xtra Mile Recordings / Epitaph Records)

=== Other ===
- The Greatest Shindig (1990) Shindig (Self-released)

=== DVDs ===
- All About the Destination (2008) Frank Turner (Xtra Mile Recordings)
- Take to the Road (2010) Frank Turner (Xtra Mile Recordings / Epitaph Records)
- Frank Turner Live From Wembley (2012) Frank Turner (Xtra Mile Recordings)

== Discography – as producer ==
=== Studio albums ===
- Almost Here (1998) Unbelievable Truth
- sorrythankyou (2000) Unbelievable Truth
- miseryguts (2003) The Sad Song Co.
- Tilting at Windmills (2005) Dive Dive
- The Bigger Picture (2006) Milow No. 10 (B) No. 78 (NL) Gold (Belgium)
- Poignant Device (2007) The Sad Song Co.
- Revenge of the Mechanical Dog (2007) Dive Dive
- Milow (2009) Milow (one track) No. 26 (B) No. 3 (GER) No. 38 (SWE) No. 17 (NL) Platinum (Germany)
- Take to the Road (2009) Frank Turner (stereo and 5.1 mixes for DVD / CD release)
- Potential (2010) Dive Dive

=== Singles / EPs ===
- Stone – EP (1997) Unbelievable Truth (Virgin Records)
- Monster / Plastic 7" Single (1997) Beaker (Fierce Panda)
- Higher Than Reason – EP (1998) Unbelievable Truth (Virgin Records)
- Solved – EP (1998) Unbelievable Truth (Virgin Records)
- Settle Down / Sea Dune – EP (1998) Unbelievable Truth (Virgin Records)
- More Familiar (2005) Milow (Homerun Records)
- One of it (2005) Milow No. 64 (NL) (Homerun Records)
- Excuse To Try (2006) Milow (Homerun Records)
- Landslide (2006) Milow (Homerun Records)

=== Demos ===
- Radiohead as On A Friday – various demos between 1986 and 1990
- Dial F For Frankenstein (2009)

== See also ==
- List of Old Abingdonians
