= The Third Three Years =

Compilation album by Frank Turner
- Released: 24 November 2014
- Recorded: 2011–2014
- Genre: Folk rock
- Length: 68:52
- Label: Xtra Mile

Frank Turner chronology
Polaroid Picture (2014)	The Third Three Years (2014)	Positive Songs for Negative People (2015)

The Third Three Years is a compilation album by singer-songwriter Frank Turner, released 24 November 2014 through Xtra Mile Recordings.

Much like its predecessors The First Three Years and The Second Three Years, the album comprises material recorded since the release of the latter of those compilations. None of these recordings have appeared on any of Turner's studio albums, and include covers, alternate and live versions of previously released songs, demos, and b-sides.

== Reception ==
Professional ratings
Review scores
Source	Rating
NME	3.5/5 stars
God is in the TV	4.5/5

== Track listing ==
All tracks are written by Frank Turner except where noted.

No.	Title	Originally appeared on	Length
1.	"Somebody to Love" (Queen cover)	I Still Believe	4:12
2.	"Hits & Mrs"	Losing Days	3:14
3.	"Sweet Albion Blues"	Polaroid Picture	2:10
4.	"Riot Song"	Fuck the Fire (An Xtra Mile rarities compilation)	2:23
5.	"Something of Freedom"	Previously unreleased demo	2:22
6.	"Field of June" (with Emily Barker & the Red Clay Halo)	Fields of June (7" release with Emily Barker)	3:12
7.	"Happy New Year" (written and performed with Jon Snodgrass)	Previously unreleased	2:59
8.	"American Girl" (Tom Petty and the Heartbreakers cover)	Previously unreleased	2:42
9.	"There Are Bad Times Just Around the Corner" (Noël Coward cover)	Under the Influence (7" split with Franz Nicolay)	3:29
10.	"Pancho & Lefty" (Townes Van Zandt cover)	Spotify Session EP – with Jim Eno	3:34
11.	"Bigfoot!" (The Weakerthans cover)	Previously unreleased	1:52
12.	"Live and Let Die" (Paul McCartney and Wings cover)	iTunes Session	2:48
13.	"The Corner" (Cory Branan cover)	The Bloodshot Records 20th Anniversary Compilation	5:04
14.	"Keira" (Tony Sly cover)	The Songs of Tony Sly: A Tribute	2:18
15.	"Plain Sailing Weather"	The Cutting Room Sessions	4:04
16.	"Tell Tale Signs"	iTunes Session	3:47
17.	"The Way I Tend to Be"	iTunes Session	3:50
18.	"The Ballad of Me and My Friends" (live version – performed at The Varsity Theater, Minneapolis, MN)	Previously unreleased	2:42
19.	"Broken Piano" (demo)	Previously unreleased	5:16
20.	"Born to Run" (Bruce Springsteen cover)	The Cutting Room Sessions	4:36
21.	"Dan's Song" (live version – performed at the Engine Shed, Lincoln)	Previously unreleased	2:31
