= Congregation (Kerbdog album) =

2014 live album by Kerbdog

Studio album by Kerbdog
- Released: 10 October 2014
- Recorded: Tracks 1–16: 07 April 2012 at Thekla, Bristol, England; 20 October 2012 at Garage, London, England, 08 December 2012 at Academy, Dublin, Ireland; Track 17: July 2014 at Tower Studios, Evesham, England
- Genre: Alternative rock
- Length: 71:22
- Label: Pledge Music & Graphite Records
- Producer: Dave Draper

Congregation is the third full-length, and first live, album by Irish alternative rock band Kerbdog. The bulk of the album was recorded in 2012 at three different gigs in England and Ireland. A studio track entitled "Electricity" (a re-working of an old 1997 demo called "Soaking Wet") was recorded at Tower Studios in Evesham in July 2014. A Pledge campaign was unveiled on 23 June 2014 to help fund and promote the new release. The campaign had reached 100% of its goal on 6 October 2014. The album was released on 10 October 2014 through Pledge Music and Graphite Records.

"Congregation" was released as a CD/DVD package and also as a Download. The DVD includes videos for "Electricity", "Severed", and "Pointless". There is also a live video of "On the Turn" from Sonisphere recorded on 6 July 2014, featuring Dave Draper on bass as a last minute replacement for Colin Fennelly, although the audio itself is the live album version from 2012.

== Track listing ==
All songs written by Kerbdog.

1. "On the Turn"
2. "Pledge"
3. "Mexican Wave"
4. "Secure"
5. "Lesser Shelf"
6. "Rewind"
7. "Severed"
8. "Didn't Even Try"
9. "Earthworks"
10. "Scram"
11. "Dry Riser"
12. "Sally"
13. "Sorry for the Record"
14. "End of Green"
15. "Pointless"
16. "JJ's Song"
17. "Electricity"

== New studio track ==
Electricity, A brief history…

1997, A battle scarred, tired, post 6 years of touring Kerbdog hit Sun Studios in Dublin. It was a strange time, we were on the verge of being fired by our label but had two new labels trying to sign us. For the new labels we recorded a session of 6 or 7 songs. Session went well and we nailed the tracks. We left feeling good about things, shaking off 1.4m label debt and starting with a clean slate. We were also looking forward to two label showcase gigs supporting Placebo in Ireland.

Next day we get a call, there's an issue. Some idiot minding the studio brought his friends in for a party and our master tapes ended up at the bottom of the river Liffey. Gutted and fully aware we were not going to capture the same energy we returned to Sun to re-record the session. As expected the tunes sounded a little tired. We didn't want to be there, it was our last weekend off before hitting the road again and our only chance to be with friends, family, and girlfriends before we left. Never mind missing Fugazi play the local parish hall in Kilkenny!

Next up, we supported Placebo in Dublin and Belfast, they heard our sound check and decided we were a bit too good. They responded by doing the honourable thing, instructing the sound guys to prohibit us from going through the P.A. system. So, we did the gig with just stage monitors, no front of house sound, no drums to be heard, no vocals, just the top end of what was coming from the stage. Naturally it sounded awful, and soul destroying… The labels "passed" and we were left with a lifeless demo. That was the writing on the wall for the Dog.

However, in that session we recorded a song called Soaking Wet. In all the doom and gloom at the time we were still very aware it had a killer chorus. The demo always sounded down beat, un Kerbdog like and tired, we didn't listen to those sessions for years for obvious reasons. I had a listen a few months back and decided we should record a real version of the song and give it what it deserves. I had a think about the arrangement and decided it need a full re-working. I came up with some ideas, convinced the boys it needed doing, which was an easy task, and planned to get it done.

Sonisphere was upon us so we had a rehearsal booked for that. I rang Battle and said I had sussed the arrangement, dynamics and plan of attack for the song. "I’m good with that, I totally trust your judgement with that stuff". We ran through it twice and sent Dave Draper an extremely rough version of the track. He got what I was getting at with it and we decided to record drums at the 2nd Sonisphere rehearsal in Evesham. It was a really fun session, we were fired up with the looming festival slot next day. You can hear that energy in the song. Battle as usual was his funny entertaining self in the studio, having the control and live room in tears laughing at recent media revelations and what not. Take one, still trying to remember the arrangement we practiced twice, sounding a little shaky, the laughter didn't help… Take two, that's the arrangement. Take three, I go for it proper, that felt good. Dave yells from the control room "There’s gold in there!!". Job done, off to play and watch my hero's at Sonisphere!

Colin dropped by some weeks later while on a trip to the UK. Laying down bass tracks. Following this Battle, Billy and Myself flew back to Evesham for guitars and vocals. It was a happy, emotional, exciting session with a huge sense of relief that the Dog could nailed something solid for the first attempt in years. It sounded in the zone sonically that the amazing production values of OOT created.

The song sounds so far removed in every aspect from the original demo, we decided it needed a new name. After a few dodgy suggestions, Battle does what he does best, comes up with the words, Electricity it is!

— Darragh Butler

== Personnel ==
- Cormac Battle – Guitar, Vocals
- Darragh Butler – Drums
- Billy Dalton – Guitar on tracks 9, 11, 17
- Colin Fennelly – Bass
- Dave Draper – Producer, Engineer, Mixing
- Canice Mills – Assistant live engineer
- Elliot Vaughan – Assistant live engineer
- Gareth Strange – Assistant live engineer

== UK Singles ==
- "Electricity" b/w "Pointless" (live) (7" vinyl)
