= Mexican Wave (song) =

Single by Kerbdog

from the album On the Turn
- Released: 17 March 1997
- Recorded: Summer 1995 at Sound City Studios and A&M Studios in Los Angeles, USA
- Genre: Alternative rock
- Label: Fontana Records; KERCD3 / 574 103-2 (CD 1); KERCC 3 / 574 105-2 (CD 2); KERDD3 / 574 107-2 (CD 3)
- Songwriter(s): Cormac Battle; Darragh Butler; Colin Fennelly; Billy Dalton
- Producer(s): GGGarth

Kerbdog singles chronology
| "Sally" (1996) | "Mexican Wave" (1997) | "Electricity" (2014) |

"Mexican Wave" is a song by the Irish metal band Kerbdog and a single released on 17 March 1997, taken from their second album On the Turn recorded in 1995 by GGGarth at Sound City Studios and A&M Studios in Los Angeles. The single was released on three different CD singles. The B-sides are live recordings of various tracks from On the Turn and Kerbdog, recorded by Paddy MacBreen for RTÉ 2FM at the Feile Festival at The Point, Dublin on 14 July 1996. The single reached number 49 on the UK Singles Chart.

== Track listing of CD1 ==
1. "Mexican Wave"
2. "Sally" (Live)
3. "On The Turn" (Live)

== Track listing of CD2 ==
1. "Mexican Wave"
2. "End Of Green" (Live)
3. "Secure" (Live)

== Track listing of CD3 ==
1. "Mexican Wave" (Live)
2. "Dry Riser" (Live)
3. "Pledge" (Live)

== Promos ==
There was also a CD DJ promo (KERCJ3)

1. Mexican Wave (Radio Edit)
2. Mexican Wave (Album Version)

== Chart performance ==
"Mexican Wave" entered the UK singles charts on 29 March 1997 and peaked after one week.

| Chart (1997) | Peak position |
|---|---|
| UK Music Week Top 75 Singles | 49 |
