= George Shilling =

- Born: 1966 (age 59–60); Redbridge, London, England
- Genres: Rock, Pop
- Occupations: Record producer, Audio engineer, musician
- Instruments: Bass, guitar, piano, Keyboards, Cello
- Years active: 1985–present
- Website: Georgeshilling.com

George Edward Shilling (born 1966 in Redbridge, London) is an English musician, record producer, composer and audio engineer. He is the son of Eric Shilling, formerly of the English National Opera and actress Erica Johns. He studied cello at the Royal College of Music and is best known as an audio engineer, a skill he was taught by Jerry Boys of Abbey Road and Livingston Recording Studios in London.

== Career ==
Shilling has worked with a diverse range of musical genres including artists such as Frank Turner, Coldcut, Gabrielle, New Radicals, The Corrs, Blur, Texas, Teenage Fanclub, Primal Scream, Nicole Appleton, Johnny Hallyday Mike Oldfield, Eternal, Boy George, James Brown, Mark Almond, Bernard Butler, The Fall, Steve Winwood and the popular light opera duo Operababes.

His first notable success was engineering the hit single The Only Way Is Up (1988) by Yazz and the Plastic Population and released by Big Life. His credits as Record producer include the Soup Dragons's album Lovegod which included their cover of the Rolling Stones hit I'm Free and the most accomplished of the three albums by My Life Story, The Golden Mile. He wrote a significant number of songs and also recorded tracks for the English down-tempo band Sundae Club. He co-wrote "London Fantasy" for the French singer Nolwenn Leroy on her album Histoires Naturelles (2005), which was produced by Laurent Voulzy. In 2009 and 2010 he hosted sessions with Ocean Colour Scene at his studio in the Cotswolds. and played cello on their album Saturday. In 2010 he also recorded and mixed Classical Relief For Haiti's single The Prayer, featuring a host of classical crossover artistes including Darius Campbell, Rhydian, Paul Potts and Julian Lloyd Webber. In recent years he relocated his studio to Devon where he has continued to work with the likes of Frank Turner, Bernard Butler and David Knopfler. He now spends much of his time in Devon, increasingly focusing on mastering projects, and creating string arrangements and cello parts, but has also produced sessions for Love Street at Real World Studios, Chris Lamb at RAK Studios and Hungarian rock band Dirty Slippers at Abbey Road Studios.

== Audio engineering and mixing credits ==
- 1986 Measure for Measure [Bonus Tracks] Icehouse (band) (Assistant Engineer)
- 1986 Measure for Measure Icehouse (band) (Assistant Engineer)
- 1986 Talking with the Taxman About Poetry Billy Bragg (Engineer)
- 1987 Saint Julian Julian Cope (Engineer)
- 1988 Doctorin' the House (12" mix) Coldcut
- 1988 The Payback Mix James Brown (Single UK #12) (Remix)
- 1988 The Only Way Is Up [Single] Yazz and the Plastic Population (UK No.1 Single)
- 1988 Wanted Yazz (UK No.3 Album)
- 1989 How To Do That/Aow Tou Dou Zat Jean-Paul Gaultier (Remix)
- 1989 What's That Noise? Coldcut (Engineer)
- 1989 You Can't Deny It Lisa Stansfield (Mixing)
- 1989 The Magic Number De La Soul (UK 7" Single Mix)
- 1990 Chemical Thing Stereo MCs/Blue Pearl (Remix)
- 1990 Telephone Thing The Fall [Single] (Engineer and Mixing)
- 1990 Blissed Out The Beloved (Engineering, Mixing)
- 1990 Boing!! Airhead (band) (Recording and mixing)
- 1991 Mothers Heaven Texas (Engineer, Mixing)
- 1991 Bed Five Thirty (Recording and mixing)
- 1995 Power of a Woman Eternal (R&B Remix)
- 1995 Entertain Me Blur [Single Remix]
- 1995 Same Thing in Reverse Boy George (12" Mix)
- 1995 Modern Pop Music Shine (Engineer and mixing)
- 1996 Brilliant Creatures Marc Almond [Single and Album] (Mixing)
- 1996 Statuesque [CD #1] Sleeper (Mixing)
- 1996 Women of Ireland Mike Oldfield (Remix)
- 1997 Kowalski [Creation Records] Primal Scream (Engineer Mixing)
- 1997 Kowalski [Sire Records] Primal Scream (B Mixing)
- 1997 Lovebugs Lovebugs (band) Engineer, (Mixing)
- 1997 Let The Spirit Move Ya 60ft Dolls (Remix)
- 1997 Songs from Northern Britain Teenage Fanclub (Engineer, Mixing)
- 1997 Star Primal Scream (Mixing, Engineer)
- 1997 Vanishing Point Primal Scream (Mixing)
- 1997 Love Is All We Need Mary J. Blige (Remix)
- 1997 You Send Me Flying Billie Myers (Engineering and Mixing)
- 1998 Explore Various Artists (Engineer, Mixing)
- 1998 People Move On Bernard Butler (Engineer, Mixing)
- 1998 Stay [Promotional] Bernard Butler (Engineer and Mixing)
- 1999 Lifting Me [Pepsi Ad/Single] The Corrs (Engineering and Mixing with K-Klass)
- 1999 Mother New Radicals (Remix)
- 2000 Friends and Lovers Bernard Butler (Engineer)
- 2000 I'd Do It Again If I Could Bernard Butler (Engineer)
- 2001 Deeper:The D:Finitive Worship Experience Delirious (Engineer)
- 2001 I'm No Angel Heather Nova (Single Mixes)
- 2001 Smiling & Waving Anja Garbarek (Engineer, Producer: Mark Hollis)
- 2002 Cabas Cabas (Mixing)
- 2002 Mona Lisa Overdrive [Poptones] Trashmonk (Mixing)
- 2003 About Time Steve Winwood (Engineer)
- 2003 Contacto Cabas (Engineer)
- 2003 Measure for Measure/Primitive Man Icehouse (Engineering assistant)
- 2003 Reflections [Special Asian Edition] Paul Van Dyk (Engineer)
- 2003 Reflections Paul Van Dyk (Engineer)
- 2003 Time of Our Lives: Connected, Vol. 1 Paul Van Dyk (Engineer)
- 2004 Exitos Mikel Erentxun (Mixing)
- 2004 Reflections [EMI Special Edition] Paul Van Dyk (Engineer)
- 2004 Reflections [Mute Records Special Edition] Paul Van Dyk (Engineer)
- 2005 22-20s 22-20s (Engineer)
- 2005 About Time [DualDisc] [Bonus Tracks] Steve Winwood (Engineer)
- 2005 Band That Prays Together Stays Together [DVD] Killing Joke (Engineer)
- 2005 Chronicles Steve Earle (Engineer)
- 2005 Deadwing Porcupine Tree (Engineer)
- 2005 Ocean: Songs for the Night Sea Journey Jennifer Cutting (Engineer)
- 2005 There's a Fire Longwave (Engineer)
- 2006 Played in Full: 90's – Definitive 12 Collection Various Artists Producer
- 2006 Renaissance Opera Babes (Engineer)
- 2006 Volume I Billy Bragg (Tape operator)
- 2007 Spirit of the Glen The Royal Scots Dragoon Guards (Mixing)
- 2008 Copperhead Road [Deluxe Edition] Steve Earle with The Pogues (Engineer)
- 2008 Greatest hits of the 80's Various Artists (Engineer)
- 2008 Simple Andy Yorke (Engineer, Mixing)
- 2008 Great Unwanted [Bonus Tracks] Lucky Soul (Engineer, Mixing)
- 2008 Beyond Imagination Opera Babes (Engineer, Mixing)
- 2008 Greatest hits of the 80's Various Artists (Engineer)
- 2008 Simple Andy Yorke (Mixing)
- 2010 Saturday Ocean Colour Scene (engineer and cello)
- 2011 Amber Smith Amber Smith (Mixing)
- 2013 Tales From Terra Firma Stornoway (band) (Engineer and Mixing)
- 2014 Suite Shop Ambient Jazz Ensemble (Mixing)
- 2015 Bonxie Stornoway (band) (Engineer and Mixing)
- 2019 Show 2000 – Live At Nottingham Rock City 15/12/16 Frank Turner (Mixing and Mastering)

== Mastering credits ==
- 2009 21st Century Man/Achtung Mutha Luke Haines
- 2011 9 1/2 Psychedelic Meditations on British Wrestling of the 1970s & Early '80s Luke Haines
- 2013 Rock and Roll Animals Luke Haines
- 2016 Live 2015 Black (singer) (Colin Vearncombe)
- 2019 Show 2000 Frank Turner
- 2019 Sweet Little Mystery Sarah Jane Morris (singer)
- 2021 Song of Co-Aklan Cathal Coughlan (musician)
- 2021 Borderline Zemfira
- 2024 Good Grief Bernard Butler
- 2024 Songdreaming Sam Lee
- 2025 Butler, Blake & Grant Bernard Butler Norman Blake (Scottish musician) James Grant (musician)
- 2026 10-CD Remasters Box Set The Sensational Alex Harvey Band
- 2026 God's Own Medicine Children Carved in Sand The Mission (band) Reissues remastering
- 2026 The Sound of McAlmont & Butler Reissue remastering

== Record production credits ==
- 1990 I'm Free The Soup Dragons
- 1990 Indie Top 20, Vol. 9 Various Artists
- 1990 Lovegod The Soup Dragons
- 1990 Mother Universe The Soup Dragons (Remixing)
- 1990 I'm Free Soup Dragons [Single UK #5]
- 1991 Boing!! Airhead (band)
- 1991 Bed Five Thirty
- 1993 Get The Girl And Kill The Baddies Pop Will Eat Itself [Single UK #9]
- 1996 You're Telling Me Bobby Valentino
- 1997 Golden Mile My Life Story
- 1997 Shorty, Pt. 1 The Wannadies
- 1997 Shorty, Pt. 2 The Wannadies
- 1998 You And Me Song (Lounge Version) The Wannadies [Single]
- 1999 Other Sister Original Soundtrack
- 2000 Yeah [CD Single] Wannadies
- 2004 Transmusicales 25th Various Artists
- 2004 Technostalgia Sundae Club
- 2007 Megaphone Theology: B Sides and Rarities My Life Story
- 2007 Coldcut The Playlist Various Artists
- 2007 Brit Box: U.K. Indie, Shoegaze, and Brit-Pop Gems of Various Artists (Mixing)
- 2008 British Summer Time Sundae Club
- 2008 Great Unwanted [Bonus Tracks] Lucky Soul
- 2008 Pleasure [Single] The Soup Dragons
- 2010 Hello Heavy EZ Basic
- 2021 30lbs Of Air Aliens ft. Tim May and Calum MacColl

== Percussion, cello and keyboard credits ==
- 1998 People Move On Bernard Butler (Cello)
- 2003 Contacto Cabas (Mezcla)
- 2006 Volume I Billy Bragg (Percussion)
- 2008 Simple Andy Yorke (Cello, accordion)
- 2008 Great Unwanted [Bonus Tracks] Lucky Soul (Percussion and keyboards)
- 2010 Saturday Ocean Colour Scene (Cello)
- 2020 Last Train Leaving David Knopfler (Cello)
- 2020 Songs Of Loss And Love David Knopfler (Cello)
- 2021 Shooting For The Moon David Knopfler (Cello)
- 2022 Skating On The Lake David Knopfler (Cello)
- 2024 Crow Gifts David Knopfler (Cello)

== Other credits ==
- 2002 Wishbones David Knopfler (Sound Consultant)
