= Almost Here =

Almost Here may refer to:

- Almost Here (The Academy Is... album), 2005
- Almost Here (Unbelievable Truth album), 1998
- "Almost Here" (Brian McFadden and Delta Goodrem song), 2005
