= Mike Got Spiked =

Irish band

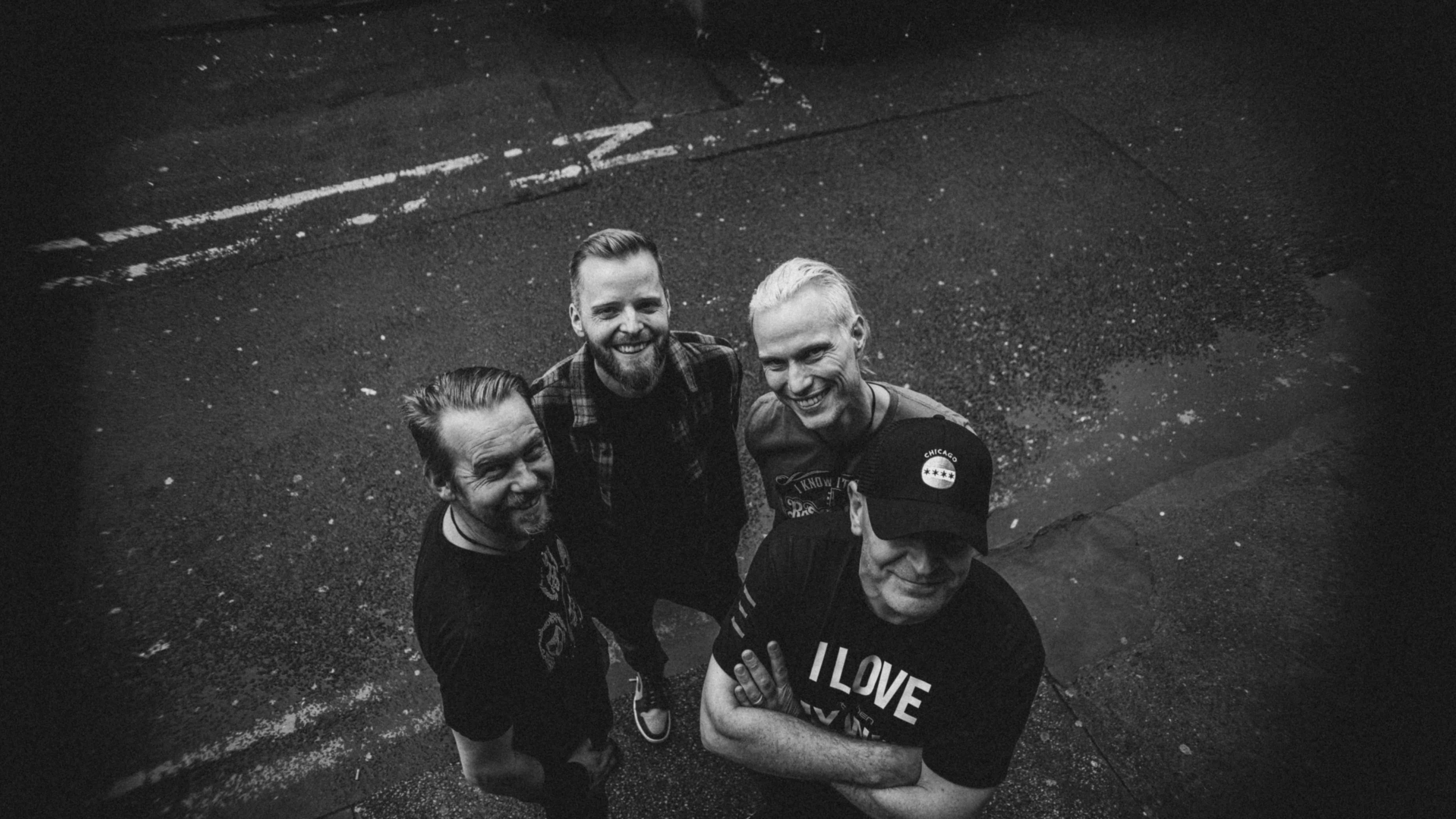

Background information
- Origin: Dublin, Ireland
- Genres: Rock punk rock metal
- Years active: 2002–2012; 2023
- Members: Conall McMahon; Gavin McGuire; David Lodge; Barry Monahan
- Past members: Jonathan Myles

mike got spiked are an Irish cult rock band, from Dublin, Ireland, formed in 2002 and disbanded in December 2012. The band gained multiple chart successes in Ireland and have toured extensively worldwide to date, sharing the stage with some of the biggest rock bands in the world. With their reformation in 2023, current members include Conall McMahon (guitar/backing vocals), Gavin McGuire (vocals), David E. Lodge (drums/backing vocalist) and Barry Monahan (bass).

Their roster includes Ireland, the UK, mainland Europe, Canada and over 40 states in the United States, supporting The Offspring, Biffy Clyro, Fall Out Boy, My Chemical Romance, The Dillinger Escape Plan, Dropkick Murphys, Thrice, Anthrax, Kerbdog, Head Automatica and Republic Of Loose.

"mike got spiked" has been described as 'blender music' and 'schizo-melody tinged rock' given the wide range of influences the quartet draw on including: Jazz, Funk, Ska, Rock, Punk and Metal

== History ==
The music industry first took notice of mike got spiked ("MGS") in July 2003, when they contributed "5 Second Heaven" to the top-10 charting compilation album "Gigsmart Ireland-The Best Of Irish Unsigned". The following year, continuing their work with Gigsmart Ireland, they embarked on a 19-show, 10-day tour covering the length and breath of Ireland, scoring a top 30 hit with "Whiskey For Me Tae/All You Need".

Landing a record contract with Irish label, "Conflict Of Interest Records", their debut album, "Caveat Emptor" was recorded from November 2004 to January 2005 in Creamy Sonic Studios in Dublin, Ireland, with American producer "Peter Slankster", following his work with Faith No More's "Roddy Bottum". The band enlisted legendary engineer "Eddie Schreyer" (System Of A Down, Alice In Chains) to master the album. In March 2005, Caveat Emptor was released and spent a number of weeks in the Irish Charts.

The band consequently secured a slot on 2005's "Van's Warped Tour" in Canada and shared the stage with some of the world's biggest rock bands, gaining a top 10 slot on the Warped Tour's official download chart. This led to a decision to trade Ireland's limited scene for the massive USA rock scene.

Before their departure, the band recorded an EP, "Poetry And Prozak" with Gigsmart Ireland, leading to a music placement of the track "Come Dancing" on "The Ex-Files", a program shown on RTÉ, Ireland's national TV channel.

== Move to America ==
June 2006 saw MGS leave for US shores. Over the next four years the band toured almost constantly, playing over 700 shows stateside, encompassing over 40 states and over 400,000 miles in their travels. This built a cult following of fans nationally, gaining the band 26,000 friends and hundreds of thousands of plays on their Myspace page between 2006 and 2008 as well as performances on "NTV", Nebraska's state TV station and on southern California's "Stim TV". In June 2008, MGS signed with the Los Angeles-based management company, Associated Talent Management (Dead Kennedys etc.).

The band first worked with Grammy nominated Irish producer Jason Donaghy (Band Of Horses/Sum 41) in October 2009 producing a live acoustic album recorded at LA's Cat Club released on April 23, 2010. Their work together continued in Perfect Sound Studios in Hollywood, leading to the contribution of MGS's version of "Dry Riser" to 1990s cult Irish rock band "Kerbdog's" tribute album, "Pledge: A Tribute To Kerbdog".

In March 2010 MGS began work on their sophomore studio album "No Is Not An Answer" ("NINAA") with Donaghy producing again, however the album was set back after tracking when bassist and founding member Jonathan Myles departed the band to pursue other interests. The band found their new bass player in fan, Barry Monahan, playing together for the first time in January 2011 before returning to the states.

Continuing to tour the US, the band started their own record company, "Hysterica Records" and set about funding the release of NINAA via Pledgemusic.com. Their successful campaign lead to the production of the video for "Sleeping With The Enemy" and the worldwide release of NINAA in April 2012.

After the a tour of the US to promote the album, mike got spiked played a handful of shows in Ireland before disbanding in December 2012.

== Videos ==
1. 5 Second Heaven (Included as a bonus on the All You Need single), directed by Aidan Maguire.
2. All You Need, directed by Aoife Kelleher.
3. Aversion, directed by Aidan Maguire.
4. To Have You Here, directed by Aidan Maguire.
5. Sleeping With The Enemy, directed by Johnathan Rothell, produced by David E. Lodge.
