= Polaroid Picture =

EP by Frank Turner
- Released: 3 February 2014
- Genre: Folk
- Label: Xtra Mile Recordings

Frank Turner chronology
Losing Days (2013)	Polaroid Picture (2014)	The Third Three Years (2014)

Polaroid Picture is an EP by Frank Turner released on February 3, 2014 via Xtra Mile. The title track was originally featured on Turner's fifth studio album Tape Deck Heart, and a music video was released on September 19, 2013. Turner covers three artists on this EP -- Frightened Rabbit's "The Modern Leper", Biffy Clyro's "Who's Got a Match?", which was also released on Turner's Losing Days (EP) and The Weakerthans' "Plea from a Cat Named Virtute." The EP also feature a newly released song called "Sweet Albion Blues."

== Track listing ==
No.	Title	Length
1.	"Polaroid Picture"	3:43
2.	"The Modern Leper" (Frightened Rabbit cover)	4:08
3.	"Plea From A Cat Named Virtute (live)" (The Weakerthans cover)	4:12
4.	"Who's Got a Match" (Biffy Clyro cover)	3:16
5.	"Sweet Albion Blues"	2:08
