= On the Turn =

1997 studio album by Kerbdog

Studio album by Kerbdog
- Released: 31 March 1997
- Recorded: July – October 1995
- Studios: Sound City (Los Angeles); A&M (Hollywood)
- Genres: Alternative rock, grunge
- Length: 55:02
- Label: Fontana Records
- Producer: Garth Richardson

Kerbdog chronology
Kerbdog (1994)	On the Turn (1997)	Congregation (2014)

Professional ratings
Review scores
Source	Rating
Allmusic -	3/5 stars

On The Turn is the second and final studio album by Irish alternative rock outfit Kerbdog, released on Fontana Records in the UK on 31 March 1997. It was produced by GGGarth who had previously worked with Rage Against the Machine.

"We did one record with a band named Kerbdog, and we started off with about 25 cabinets and amps. It took about two days just to go through 'em all, but we got the best sounds that we have ever gotten. We used old Les Pauls, old Strats and Teles, different strings, different pickups."
GGGarth

Rehearsals began at Full Blast Studios in Los Angeles in July 1995 before recording took place at Sound City Studios and A&M Studios over the following months. The band spent almost 4 months rehearsing/recording and the album went massively over budget, including a scrapped mix of the entire album by Alan Moulder. The final mix of the album was provided by Joe Barresi. Recording took its toll on guitarist Billy Dalton who departed the band shortly after returning home.

"If GGGarth hadn't pointed out what was going on, then Billy might still be in the band. We're really nice guys and he was a mate, so we couldn't say 'Are you able to do this'? I think if he was still with us, he'd be in a mental home by now. He said in America that if things didn't improve for himself when we came home, he'd leave, so it wasn't like we just arrived on his door step and said, 'you're fired' or anything."
Colin Fennelly

Unfortunately, the album was delayed release by over a year and never sold in great enough quantities to satisfy the record label, reaching number 64 in the UK Albums Chart. Unlike their debut album, it never saw release in the States, despite being recorded there. Kerbdog were dropped by Mercury and their back catalog was deleted shortly thereafter. The band split in March 1998, with Battle and Butler regrouping to form Wilt later that year.

The album was originally released on LP, CD and cassette. It was re-released on CD in September 2012 on East World Records UK. On January 3, 2022, it was released on Spotify.

"On The Turn" was finally re-released on yellow vinyl in November 2020 on Hassle Records and added to online streaming services like YouTube Music in early January 2022. There was also a clear vinyl edition, limited to 300 hand-numbered copies.

== Track listing ==
All songs composed by Kerbdog

1. "Sally" - 3:56
2. "J.J.'s Song" - 5:23
3. "Didn't Even Try" - 4:07
4. "Mexican Wave" - 4:19
5. "Severed" - 4:12
6. "Pledge" - 4:11
7. "On the Turn" - 4:47
8. "Secure" - 4:03
9. "Lesser Shelf" - 4:19
10. "Pointless" - 5:02
11. "Rewind" - 3:27
12. "Sorry for the Record" - 7:16

"Hard To Live" and "Gridlock" from the album sessions were later released as b-sides to the "J.J.'s Song" EP.

== Personnel ==
- Cormac Battle - vocals/guitars
- Billy Dalton - guitars
- Colin Fennelly - bass
- Darragh Butler - drums
- Roy Z - guitars
- GGGarth - producer
- Stan Katayama - engineer
- Joe Barresi - mixer
- Howie Weinberg - masterer

== Singles ==
- "J.J.'s Song" - (1996) #139
- "Sally" - (1996) #69
- "Mexican Wave" - (1997) #49

== Chart performance ==
On the Turn entered the UK artist albums chart on 12 April 1997 and spent one week on.

Chart (1997)	Peak position
UK Music Week Top 75 Artist Albums	64

== Legacy ==
Artists such as Biffy Clyro, Frank Turner, Inme, Cars on Fire and others have all said this album had a major influence on their music. Biffy Clyro also stated that they chose GGGarth to produce their last two albums based on his work with Kerbdog. Biffy Clyro's lead singer, Simon Neil, has been quoted as saying that 'On The Turn' "...is a beautiful, beautiful thing".
