= The Great Unwanted =

Studio album by Lucky Soul
- Released: 9 April 2007
- Genre: Indie pop
- Length: 51:34
- Label: Ruffa Lane
- Producer: George Shilling

Lucky Soul chronology
| The Great Unwanted (2007) | A Coming of Age (2010) |

The Great Unwanted is the debut album by British indie pop band Lucky Soul. The band self-released it through Ruffa Lane Records on 9 April 2007.

The album is heavily influenced by 1960s soul music, featuring string and brass arrangements. Its romantic melodies are often accompany more doleful lyrics. The album received acclaim from music critics, who praised the careful fusion of Lucky Soul's influences. The Great Unwanted yielded five singles but did not find commercial success.

== Background and music ==
The project began when Andrew Laidlaw was a university student in Scotland. He used a sampler to produce electronic music that he likened to The Avalanches and Saint Etienne. Wanting to achieve a more organic sound, he recruited additional musicians after he moved to London. The group began performing live in June 2005, starting with a performance alongside The Pipettes. As the group wrote songs, lyrics came from Laidlaw and drummer Ivor Sims, and other members prepared the instrumentation. Laidlaw also produced arrangements for string and brass. The band had George Shilling produce the album.

The Great Unwanted is influenced by pop and soul girl groups of the 1960s. The full-scale string and brass arrangements add a sense of drama to the music. Its instrumentation draws from the emotional candidness of Phil Spector's Wall of Sound. Laidlaw also identified Motown and Stax Records as influences. He had a stated desire to balance retro influences with modern production techniques, explaining, "I love the old gear, but it's blinkered if that's all you use. There's plenty of good stuff that's happened in the past 30 years and we use the odd electronic twirl on our music."

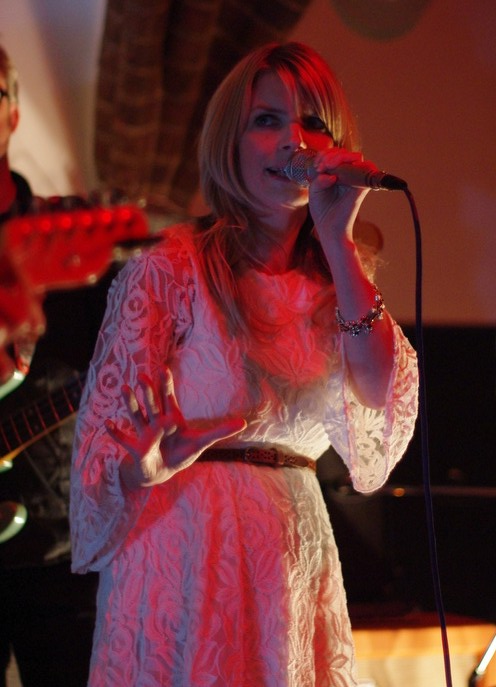
Ali Howard's vocals were described as "unshowy" and "polished".

Singer Ali Howard's melodies are romantic and bittersweet. The jubilant lyrics often belie melancholic themes. Howard's sweet, girlish vocals drew comparisons to Dusty Springfield and Sandie Shaw. Music critics noted similarities to alternative dance band Saint Etienne in Howard's affectionate presentation of tragic lyrics.

== Reception and release ==
Professional ratings
Review scores
| Source | Rating |
|---|---|
| The Guardian | 4/5 stars |
| The Independent on Sunday | 5/5 stars |
| Metro | 5/5 stars |
| NME | (6/10) |
| Pitchfork | (8.0/10) |
| PopMatters | (9/10) |
| Q | 3/5 stars |
| The Times | 4/5 stars |
| Uncut | 4/5 stars |

The Great Unwanted met with critical acclaim from music critics. The Independent on Sunday remarked that despite an initial period of hype "so long that one began to wonder whether they would ever actually deliver…The Great Unwanted is an immediate classic". The Times described the album as "something of a 'best of'" that measured up to the quality of "Lips Are Unhappy" and "Ain't Never Been Cool". The NME commented that although the band sometimes "slip over the line with one too many handclaps…mostly, it looks like a summer of love is coming their way." PopMatters noted that many other independent bands had released works patterned after Motown girl groups but that "none has done it as completely and confidently as Lucky Soul does here, with as full a sense of the many dimensions one song can have." The Guardian wrote that "Understatement isn't in their remit, but what a glorious, over-romanticised racket they make." Pitchfork characterized the songs as "the type of sumptuous bubblegum that made an impressive showing on Pitchfork's 'The 200 Greatest Songs of the 1960s' but rarely places on year-end album lists."

Reviewers were generally positive regarding the album's reappropriation of retro styles. Metro wrote that there was a "mischievous sense of pastiche here in the careful calibration of retro references" but that the band "incorporate this knowingness with such disarming ease". AllMusic said that "the style never overwhelms the substance, which is to say that as extravagant as the lush, period-appropriate orchestrations get…it's all in the service of some top-notch songwriting." Q noted that "There are pastiches here…but when they get it right, they can soar." Uncut stated that although the band "may appear a bunch of whimsical pastiche-mongers…their debut performs the rare feat of meticulously acknowledging its inspirations—The Chiffons and The Shangri-Las via Dusty Springfield—while also transcending them."

PopMatters named The Great Unwanted the third best indie pop album of the year and placed the album at 41 on its list of the best albums of 2007. Metro also included the album on its year-end list. Pitchfork listed the album as one of the year's most overlooked records. BBC Radio 1 DJ Colin Murray, who supported the Ain't Never Been Cool EP, predicted the album would win the 2007 Mercury Music Prize; however, it failed to make the shortlist.

Believing it would be difficult to attract the attention of a major label, the band decided to self-release the album through their own Ruffa Lane Records. Cost prevented them from pressing it on vinyl, so the band initially made it available as a CD and digital download. Luis Calvo, owner of Madrid-based independent label Elefant Records, found Lucky Soul through the Internet and asked about releasing The Great Unwanted in Spain. The band agreed, citing the label's success with Camera Obscura. The album's critical attention failed to translate into sales, and it sold 50,000 copies worldwide. At the end of 2007, Last.fm users selected "Lips Are Unhappy" for a "Christmas Chart Attack". Lucky Soul re-released the song with a cover of Mud's 1974 Christmas single "Lonely This Christmas".

== Singles ==
"Lips Are Unhappy" (2006)
The album's second single, in which joyful harmonies are used to intensify emotion "by seeming to suppress it".

"My Brittle Heart" was released in March 2006 as the band's debut single, with B-side "Give Me Love". It was followed three months later by "Lips Are Unhappy", released as a signed 7" vinyl single. The song pairs a prominent rhythm section with melancholic, soulful vocals. A black-and-white music video was produced for it, in which Ali Howard is shown obscured by shadows.

An EP for "Ain't Never Been Cool" was released in January 2007. It includes ballad "I Gots the Magic" and album track "Struck Dumb". A limited release of a 7" single for "Add Your Light to Mine, Baby" followed in March. The song was used as the theme song for Japanese TV series Takeshi's University. Its music video is colourful, showing the band in full dress. "One Kiss Don't Make a Summer" became the album's final single in September 2007, with B-side "That Hollywood Glow". Its lyrics detail the outcome of a summer romance.

== Track listing ==
All tracks are written by Lucky Soul.

| No. | Title | Length |
|---|---|---|
| 1. | "Add Your Light to Mine, Baby" | 2:26 |
| 2. | "One Kiss Don't Make a Summer" | 3:49 |
| 3. | "Struck Dumb" | 2:50 |
| 4. | "Lips Are Unhappy" | 3:36 |
| 5. | "My Darling, Anything" | 2:56 |
| 6. | "Get Outta Town!" | 3:47 |
| 7. | "The Great Unwanted" | 3:57 |
| 8. | "Baby I'm Broke" | 4:05 |
| 9. | "My Brittle Heart" | 3:14 |
| 10. | "Ain't Never Been Cool" | 2:44 |
| 11. | "The Towering Inferno" | 3:35 |
| 12. | "It's Yours" | 4:23 |
| 13. | "The Last Song" (includes hidden track "A Lullaby") | 10:16 |
