= Song to Woody =

Bob Dylan song

Song by Bob Dylan

from the album Bob Dylan
- Released: March 19, 1962
- Recorded: November 1961
- Genre: Folk
- Length: 2:42
- Label: Columbia; Capitol (US)
- Songwriter: Bob Dylan
- Producer: John Hammond

"Song to Woody" is a song written by American singer-songwriter Bob Dylan and released on his debut album, Bob Dylan, in 1962. The song conveys Dylan's appreciation of American folk legend Woody Guthrie. The song is one of two original compositions featured on Dylan's debut album. Dylan also rehearsed the song in a country arrangement during sessions for Self Portrait on May 1, 1970, as heard on the 2021 compilation album 1970.

== Background ==
In January 1961, a 19-year-old Bob Dylan left Minnesota to go to New York with the intention of meeting his then idol Woody Guthrie. However, he failed to find Guthrie when he went to his house or Greystone Park Psychiatric Hospital where Guthrie often stayed due to Huntington's disease. In late January or early February, he finally met Guthrie at the home of Bob and Sidsel Gleason in East Orange, New Jersey where Guthrie regularly spent his weekends. He sang a few songs for Guthrie. Soon after meeting Guthrie, Dylan wrote "Song to Woody".

The tune uses the melody from Guthrie's song "1913 Massacre" and one stanza ends with the lines "I'm a-singin' you this song, but I can't sing enough / 'Cause there's not many men that done the things that you've done."

The penultimate stanza of "Song To Woody" pays tribute to Guthrie folk contemporaries Cisco Houston, Sonny Terry and Lead Belly and "all the good people that traveled with you". The line "that come with the dust and are gone with the wind" paraphrases the line "we come with the dust and we go with the wind" in Guthrie's "Pastures of Plenty", a song about people displaced by the dust storms and drought which swept Oklahoma, Texas and other states in the 1930s during The Great Depression.

Dylan sang the song to Guthrie during one of his frequent visits, which pleased Guthrie greatly. Guthrie was said to have remarked after Dylan left: "That boy's got a voice, maybe he won't make it by his writing, but he can really sing it."

== Significance ==
"Song to Woody" is central to Daniel Wolff's Grown-Up Anger: The Connected Mysteries of Bob Dylan, Woody Guthrie, and the Calumet Massacre of 1913 published in June 2017. The book weaves a tale connecting "Song to Woody", "1913 Massacre", the lives of Dylan and Guthrie, American labor history and more.

In October 1992, a star-studded concert was given at Madison Square Garden in Dylan's honor; it was simultaneously broadcast for pay-per-view. After hours of a multitude of artists singing his songs, Dylan himself came out and performed "Song to Woody" solo.

A live version of "Song to Woody" was recorded at Santa Cruz Civic Auditorium, Santa Cruz, California, on March 16, 2000 and released on the "Things Have Changed" CD single in 2000.

=== Homages and covers ===
David Bowie refers to the song in his tribute to Dylan, "Song for Bob Dylan", which begins with the line, "Now hear this, Robert Zimmerman, I wrote this song for you" mirroring Dylan's own "Hey, hey Woody Guthrie, I wrote you a song." The song is on Bowie's 1971 album Hunky Dory.

Irish folk singer Christy Moore recorded a version of the song with the name "Tribute to Woody" in his 1972 album Prosperous.

Frank Turner references the song in his song "Pass it Along", with the lyrics "Hey, hey Mr. Dylan, I have written you a song." This originally appeared on his Rock & Roll EP and was subsequently released on compilation The Second Three Years, which also features a cover of "Song to Woody" renamed "Song to Bob" with some lyrical adjustments.

A punk rock version by Silverstein can be found on the Amnesty International charity album Chimes of Freedom.

The song was used as the end credits music in the Mad Men episode "Guy Walks Into an Advertising Agency".

Timothée Chalamet performs the song live on camera as Bob Dylan in James Mangold's 2024 film A Complete Unknown. It was subsequently released on the film's soundtrack album.
