= A Coming of Age =

Studio album by Lucky Soul
- Released: 19 April 2010
- Genre: Indie pop
- Length: 39:46
- Label: Ruffa Lane

Lucky Soul chronology
The Great Unwanted (2007)	A Coming of Age (2010)

A Coming of Age is the second album by British indie pop band Lucky Soul. It was self-released through Ruffa Lane Records in 2010.

== Production ==
The band began writing songs for the album in late 2008. Early the following year, they recorded five songs with the Stockholm Strings. Frontman Andrew Laidlaw described the music as "somewhere in between Motown and The Smiths." He noted that the album as "a bit darker and...more direct" than Lucky Soul's debut album The Great Unwanted.

== Critical reception ==
The album received mixed reviews from music critics. Pitchfork said that it "attempts a subtler maturation, with mixed results". PopMatters commented that A Coming of Age "builds on their strengths but sees them developing that sound in several different directions...Sharp songwriting and musicianship makes all the difference." The NME panned the album, writing that "Lucky Soul have taken things a sugar lump too far." In his review for The Independent, Simon Price called it "one of the albums of the year, hands down". AllMusic said that despite not reaching the "emotional heft and potency" of its predecessor, the album was "a consistent, consummate, brilliant piece of pop".

== Track listing ==
All tracks are written by Andrew Laidlaw.

No.	Title	Length
1.	"Woah Billy!"	3:31
2.	"White Russian Doll"	2:27
3.	"Up in Flames"	2:57
4.	"Love^{3}"	2:11
5.	"Upon Hilly Fields"	3:54
6.	"A Coming of Age"	3:03
7.	"Warm Water"	3:33
8.	"Ain't Nothin' Like a Shame (To Bring It All Back Home)"	3:09
9.	"That's When Trouble Begins"	2:42
10.	"Southern Melancholy"	2:39
11.	"Our Heart"	2:51
12.	"Could Be I Don't Belong Anywhere"	3:28
