= Unbelievable Truth =

British rock band

- Origin: Oxford, England
- Genres: Alternative rock acoustic rock
- Years active: 1993–2000, 2005, 2007, 2023–present
- Members: Jim Crosskey; Jason Moulster; Nigel Powell; Andy Yorke
- Website: www.unbelievabletruth.co.uk

Unbelievable Truth are a British rock band, led by Andy Yorke, with Nigel Powell, Jason Moulster, and Jim Crosskey. Their sound has been described as "slow, melancholy, country-tinged ballads, wrapped in a soft blanket of acoustic guitars and minor chords".

== History ==
The band was formed in 1993 in Oxford, England, and named after Hal Hartley's film, The Unbelievable Truth. A crisis of confidence led to a split in 1995, during which time Yorke took to exile in Russia. Upon his return in 1996, the band released their first single, "Building" in February 1997 on Shifty Disco, a record label based in Oxford. They released their first album, Almost Here, in 1998 on Virgin, and although being subsequently dropped by Virgin, the album had some success. In 2000, the band released their next album Sorrythankyou on Shifty Disco, the first from that label to be pressed in vinyl.

The group parted ways in 2000 due to Yorke's decision to leave the band. In 2001, Unbelievable Truth released a double album, self-published, called Misc. Music. Disc 1 contained B-sides and unreleased tracks, while disc 2 was the live recording of their farewell show held at the Zodiac in Oxford on 16 September 2000.

Since then, all of the members have gone on to other musical projects. Drummer Nigel Powell formed a new band, The Sad Song Co., and has been playing with another Oxford band Dive Dive (formerly Dustball). They have released three singles and one album, and are currently at work on their second LP. Powell has been working and touring with folk singer/songwriter Frank Turner since his solo career began, performing on all of his records to date with fellow Dive Dive members Ben Lloyd and Tarrant Anderson. He left Turner's band The Sleeping Souls in late 2020. Jim Crosskey and Jason Moulster became part of the group Nine Stone Cowboy, along with members of other defunct Oxford bands The Candyskins and Ride.

Unbelievable Truth reunited for a one-off concert in Oxford to support tsunami victims on 19 February 2005. In May 2007, the band, as a three-piece ensemble, played an acoustic set at the closing night of Oxford venue The Zodiac, before a summer refit.

In 2007, former frontman Yorke completed his first solo effort with the help of ex-bandmates Powell and Moulster. The album Simple was released on 14 July 2008.

In May 2023, social media accounts were opened for the band (as featuring Andy Yorke, Nigel Powell and Jason Moulster). Anniversary gigs celebrating 25 years since the release of the band's debut album were planned for 15 and 20 September 2023.

After the first 'Almost Here' reunion show at the Jericho Tavern, Oxford. Jason Moulster said the band had been working on new material but were unsure if they wanted to do anything with it.

In April 2024 the band announced they would be playing at the ‘Shiiine on’ indoor festival in Minehead, UK in November as well as a warm up show the night before in Exeter.

In November 2024, the band announced via social media that they were releasing a live album of their Almost Here reunion show, due for release on November 15. This would be the band's first release since 'misc music' in 2001. On 11 November 2024, the band unveiled a video for the recording of 'From This Height' (taken from the new album), featuring footage from the 2023 shows and tour footage from the 1990s.

On 30 January 2025, a new single called "Citizens Band" was announced for release on 7 February, with a similarly-titled EP to follow. Two further singles, "Madison" and "Non-Combatant", followed on 21 February and 7 March respectively.

== Discography ==
=== Albums ===
- Almost Here (1998) - UK No. 21
- Sorrythankyou (2000)
- Misc. Music (2001)
- Rich Inner Life (2025)

=== EPs ===
- Stone - EP (1997) - UK No. 77
- Higher Than Reason - EP (1998)
- Settle Down / Sea Dune - EP (1998)
- Solved - EP (1998)
- citizens band EP (2025)

=== Singles ===
- "Building" (1997)
- "Stone" / "Finest Little Space" (1997) - UK No. 77
- "Higher Than Reason" (1998) - UK No. 38
- "Solved" (1998) - UK No. 39
- "Settle Down" / "Dune Sea" (1998) - UK No. 46
- "Agony" (2000)
- "Landslide" (2000)
- "Advice to a Lover" (2000)
- "Citizens Band" (2025)
- "Madison" (2025)
- "Non-Combatant" (2025)
- "You've Got It" (2025)
- "Funny Peculiar" (2025)
