= I Still Believe (Frank Turner song) =

Single by Frank Turner

from the album Rock & Roll and England Keep My Bones
- B-side: "Somebody to Love"
- Released: 28 October 2010 single 21 April 2012 Record Store Day
- Recorded: 2010
- Genre: Folk rock, folk punk
- Length: 3:47
- Label: Xtra Mile Records
- Songwriter(s): Frank Turner

Frank Turner singles chronology
"Try This at Home" (2010)	"I Still Believe" (2010)	"Peggy Sang the Blues" (2011)

Music video
- "I Still Believe" on YouTube

"I Still Believe" is the ninth single by UK-based songwriter Frank Turner, and the first of his fourth EP Rock & Roll. It was released on 28 October 2010. "I Still Believe" had a limited release of 500 7" vinyl's for the 2012 Record Store Day on 21 April. The B-Side to the vinyl is Frank's cover of Queen's "Somebody to Love". Both of which were released digitally a week later on 30 April.

The song was also featured on his fourth studio album England Keep My Bones. It also appeared on Isles of Wonder, the soundtrack album of the 2012 Summer Olympics opening ceremony.

Upon its re-release in 2012, it reached No. 40 on the UK Singles Chart, becoming Turner's first top 40 hit.

== Track listing ==
All tracks are written by Frank Turner

Digital download
No.	Title	Length
1.	"I Still Believe"	3:47

7-inch vinyl
No.	Title	Writer(s)	Length
1.	"I Still Believe"	Frank Turner	3:47
2.	"Somebody to Love"	Freddie Mercury

== Charts ==
Chart (2012)	Peak position
UK Singles (OCC)	40
