= Dirty Slippers =

Dirty Slippers is a pop-rock band from Gyula, Hungary, formed in 2005. Led by singer-guitarist Lázár Lobó-Szalóky, the line-up of the band has changed multiple times since its foundation.

== Career ==
In 2008, Dirty Slippers released their self-titled first album, produced by Zoltán Jappán Takács, which was followed by a 20-date headline tour of Hungary.

The band achieved minor success in their home country in September 2009 with their song "Élned kell", which was used in a Hungarian campaign against cervical cancer run by GlaxoSmithKline. The band's following video, "Te oyd a Fény", topped the MTV Hungary charts for 8 weeks. In 2011, they established Suliturné, a cancer awareness and anti-alcohol school tour program.

On 8 October 2012, they released the album Közel Hozzád (English: Close to You) on the HungaroSound label, which was recorded in the US with producer George Shilling, and spent over 10 weeks on the MAHASZ album chart. They became a regular opening act for the Hungarian pop-rock band Republic, and toured Europe three times, first with The Coronas in November 2012, then with the Romanian rock band Rezident EX, and lastly with The Last Vegas. The band also appeared on the Hungarian reality show, Édes élet.

They began touring their next album, Müzsa, in November 2015.

They worked with Shilling again in 2021 on their album Vársz szalóky, recorded at Abbey Road Studios in London.
