= Misc. Music =

Compilation album by Unbelievable Truth
- Released: 2001
- Recorded: 1997–2000
- Genre: Alternative rock
- Label: Shifty Disco
- Producer: Nigel Powell, Jim Warren

Professional ratings
Review scores
Source	Rating
AllMusic	1.5/5 stars

Misc. Music is a compilation album by Unbelievable Truth, released on the Shifty Disco label in 2001.

It consists of two CDs, the first containing unreleased tracks and B-sides from throughout their career, the second a recording of their farewell show held at the Zodiac in Oxford on 16 September 2000.

== Track listing ==
=== Disc one ===
Unreleased/B-Sides

1. "Live Without This" - 3:52
2. "Building" [Shifty Disco single version] - 5:30
3. "Roadside No 2" - 3:55
4. "Landslide" [acoustic] - 2:58
5. "In the Beginning" - 4:41
6. "Believe in Anger" - 3:10
7. "Some of These People" - 2:02
8. "Nightlight" - 4:01
9. "Over" - 3:59
10. "History / Fiction" - 3:20
11. "Unwanted Gift" - 3:55
12. "Ciao! My Shining Star" - 3:42
13. "All This Time" - 2:57
14. "Heaven Sent Me" - 3:15
15. "Mea Culpa" - 3:45
16. "Everyone Has to Eat" - 3:56
17. "Disaster" - 3:41
18. "Whose Side Are You On?" - 2:20
19. "Roadside No 1" [live] - 2:54
- The live version of Roadside No 1 is a hidden track at end of 18, starting at 6:32.
- Tracks 1, 4, 5, 6, 7, 9, 10, 11, 12, 13, 15, 17, 18 and 19 are previously unreleased.

=== Disc two ===
Live

1. "Almost Here" [live] - 4:38
2. "Pedestrian" [live] - 3:36
3. "Landslide" [live] - 3:16
4. "Who's to Know" [live] - 5:21
5. "Stone" [live] - 3:46
6. "Home Again" [live] - 3:17
7. "Daylight" [live] - 5:24
8. "Hypnotist" [live] - 3:39
9. "Higher Than Reason" [live] - 4:11
10. "Forget About Me" [live] - 4:16
11. "Covers" [live] - 2:40
12. "From This Height" [live] - 3:22
13. "Building" [live] - 5:09
14. "Agony" [live] - 2:58
15. "Finest Little Space" [live] - 4:06
16. "Solved" [live] - 3:43
17. "I Can't Wait" [live] - 10:25
- All tracks previously unreleased

== Personnel ==
- Andy Yorke - guitar, vocals
- Nigel Powell - drums, percussion, backing vocals, keyboards, guitar, bass
- Jason Moulster - bass, backing vocals, guitar
- Jim Crosskey - guitar, keyboards
