= Tape Deck Heart =

Studio album by Frank Turner
- Released: 22 April 2013
- Recorded: 2012 in Los Angeles
- Genres: Folk rock, folk punk, punk rock
- Length: 50:20
- Labels: Xtra Mile, Polydor, Interscope
- Producer: Rich Costey

Frank Turner chronology
The Second Three Years (2011)	Tape Deck Heart (2013)	Losing Days (2013)

Singles from Tape Deck Heart
- 1. "Recovery" Released: 4 March 2013; 2. "The Way I Tend to Be" Released: 6 June 2013; 3. "Losing Days" Released: 1 September 2013; 4. "Oh Brother" Released: 9 October 2013; 5. "Polaroid Picture" Released: 3 February 2014

Professional ratings
Aggregate scores
Source	Rating
Metacritic	76/100
Review scores
Source	Rating
AllMusic	3.5/5 stars
The A.V. Club	B
The Guardian	4/5 stars
Hellhound Music	8/10 stars
NME	8/10
PopMatters	8/10
Punknews.org	3.5/5 stars
Sputnikmusic	4.6/5 stars
The Telegraph	4/5 stars
This Is Fake DIY	5/10

Tape Deck Heart is the fifth studio album by English singer-songwriter Frank Turner, released on 22 April 2013 on Xtra Mile in the UK, and on Polydor / Interscope worldwide. Produced by Rich Costey, the album was preceded by the single, "Recovery."

Described as a "break-up album," Tape Deck Heart was written and recorded following the collapse of a long-term romantic relationship. Turner stated: "There’s a lot of stuff on this record about loss and failure in relationships, about what happens when something that was supposed to be timeless runs out of time."

Tape Deck Heart has been given a Parental Advisory label due to the profanity heard on tracks "Plain Sailing Weather" and "Good & Gone". The title of the album is taken from a lyric in the song "Tell Tale Signs".

== Background and recording ==
After extensive touring in support of Turner's fourth studio album, England Keep My Bones (2011) - which included an appearance during the 2012 Summer Olympics opening ceremony and a headline show at Wembley Arena - Turner and his backing band, The Sleeping Souls, flew to Los Angeles, in October 2012, to enter the studio with producer Rich Costey, seeking a "big, warm expansive rock sound." Regarding the band's experience in Los Angeles, Turner stated, "It’s such a cliché – bands reach a certain level of success, go to L.A. to record an album. I was nervous about recording outside the UK because my music sounds English and I like that, but in fact, it didn’t make any difference. We stayed at the Holiday Inn next door and didn’t finish until dark every day, so I scarcely saw the sun shine."

Regarding Costey's production, Turner noted, "I will say that I think the production is a massive step up for me. [...] The man is a fucking genius." Nicknamed, "Sauron, the all seeing eye," by Turner and his bandmates, Costey often made the band perform multiple takes in the studio, with Turner stating: "He brings an almost autistic eye for detail. He made me do 42 vocal takes at one point, with the encouragement ‘I know there’s something in there'."

Fergus Coulbeck who featured on Turners 3rd album Poetry of the Deed was quoted saying he would never work with Turner again following a dispute over baked goods and refreshments available while recording Tape Deck Heart.

== Writing and composition ==
Explaining the album's title, Turner stated, "A 'Tape Deck Heart' is someone who has a love of music above anything else. I don’t miss cassettes, but I am of an age - like many of us - whose music listening life was defined by Walkmen and C90 tapes."

Comparing the album's lyrical and thematic content to his previous album, England Keep My Bones (2011), Turner noted: "This record isn't about England at all — I did that last time round. This album is about self-examination, running through your own faults, about change, and about ending. Something like that."

Regarding the track, "Four Simple Words", Turner stated, "I think that song is something of a nod towards Queen, stylistically. But it’s not something that markedly runs through the record as such, I don’t think." Turner elaborated, "I tell people it's about dancing but it's really a song about punk rock and the pleasantly surprising revelation that, at 31, my ethics and approach to music are the same as when I was 15."

== Artwork ==
The artwork for the album was done by tattoo artist Heather Ann Law. She later appeared as herself in the music video for “Losing Days”, giving Turner a new tattoo.

== Release ==
On 25 December 2012, Turner released a free download of "Four Simple Words" on his website, backed with a demo version of the song, "Cowboy Chords". The opening track and first single, "Recovery", premiered on Radio 1, on 4 March 2013 and was released on iTunes the following day.

The deluxe edition of the album contains six additional tracks, with Turner noting, "Track listing an album is a fine art, and usually a pretty agonising process. I’m glad I've had the opportunity to do the extended version for this one – all these songs belong together. That said, I think an album is a piece of art in its own right and can be too long, so it’s worth making the twelve-track definitive version. Choosing what makes it and what doesn’t is agonising, though."

== Commercial performance ==
The album entered the UK chart at No. 2 on its release, and was certified Gold by the BPI. It became his most successful album yet, with 200,000 copies sold.

In the United States, the album debuted at No. 52 on Billboard 200, and No. 15 on Top Rock Albums, selling 7,000 copies in its first week. It has sold 44,000 copies in the United States as of July 2015.

== Track listing ==
All tracks are written by Frank Turner, except where noted.

No.	Title	Length
1.	"Recovery"	3:28
2.	"Losing Days"	3:32
3.	"The Way I Tend to Be"	3:41
4.	"Plain Sailing Weather" (Frank Turner, Matt Nasir)	4:01
5.	"Good & Gone"	3:50
6.	"Tell Tale Signs"	4:12
7.	"Four Simple Words"	4:56
8.	"Polaroid Picture"	3:43
9.	"The Fisher King Blues"	5:00
10.	"Anymore"	3:09
11.	"Oh Brother" (Turner, Nasir)	4:18
12.	"Broken Piano"	5:30

Deluxe Edition Bonus Tracks
No.	Title	Length
13.	"We Shall Not Overcome"	3:52
14.	"Wherefore Art Thou Gene Simmons?"	3:35
15.	"Tattoos"	2:39
16.	"Undeveloped Film"	4:17
17.	"Time Machine"	3:20
18.	"Cowboy Chords"	3:21

US Amazon Deluxe Edition Bonus Track
No.	Title	Length
17.	"Cowboy Chords"	3:21

US iTunes Deluxe Edition Bonus Track
No.	Title	Length
17.	"Undeveloped Film"	4:17

iTunes UK Deluxe Edition Bonus Tracks
No.	Title	Length
13.	"We Shall Not Overcome"	3:52
14.	"Wherefore Art Thou Gene Simmons?"	3:35
15.	"Tattoos"	2:39
16.	"Undeveloped Film"	4:17
17.	"Time Machine"	3:20
18.	"Cowboy Chords"	3:21
19.	"Oh Brother (Live From London / 2013)"	3:57
20.	"Plain Sailing Weather (Live From London / 2013)"	4:02

=== Editions ===
- Standard CD
- Deluxe CD
- 12" Vinyl available in green or black
- iTunes LP
- Cassette Tape

== Singles ==
"Four Simple Words" was released as a free download, along with a demo version of "Cowboy Chords" through Xtra Miles website on Christmas Day 2012. The first single from the album was "Recovery", which was released on 5 March 2013 and the music video was released the same day. "The Way I Tend To Be" was later released on 17 June and peaked at number 33 in the UK singles chart. "Losing Days" was the third single to be released.

== Charts ==
=== Weekly charts ===
Chart (2013)	Peak position
Austrian Albums (Ö3 Austria)	34
Belgian Albums (Ultratop Flanders)	138
German Albums (Offizielle Top 100)	21
Swiss Albums (Schweizer Hitparade)	79
UK Albums (Official Charts)	2
US Billboard 200	52
US Americana/Folk Albums (Billboard)	4
US Top Rock Albums (Billboard)	15
US Indie Store Album Sales (Billboard)	13

=== Year-end charts ===
Chart (2013)	Position
UK Albums (OCC)	143

== Certifications ==
Region	Certification	Certified units/sales
United Kingdom (BPI)	Gold	100,000^{‡}
^{‡} Sales+streaming figures based on certification alone.

== Personnel ==
=== Frank Turner & the Sleeping Souls ===
- Frank Turner – lead vocals, acoustic guitar, electric guitar, backing vocals
- Ben Lloyd – electric guitar, backing vocals, noise (12), drums (12)
- Tarrant Anderson – bass guitar, backing vocals, drums (12)
- Matt Nasir – piano, accordion, organ, Mellotron, Rhodes, Wurlitzer, mandolin, xylophone, backing vocals, drums (12)
- Nigel Powell – drums, percussion, recorder, backing vocals

=== Additional musicians ===
- Rich Costey - electric guitar (1 and 9), backing vocals (7)
- Elle King - banjo (3)
- Fergus Coulbeck - jew’s harp ("her velvet tones")
- John Hill - soundscapes (3)
- Chris Trovero - backing vocals (7)
- Scott Keys - backing vocals (7)
- Deena Keys - backing vocals (7)
- Samantha Keys - backing vocals (7)
- Chris Kasych - backing vocals (7)
- Ben Hallett - backing vocals (7)

=== Recording personnel ===
- Rich Costey - producer, recording, mixing
- Chris Kasych - engineer, additional mixing (9 and 12)
- Dave Schiffman - additional engineering
- Eric Isip - recording assistant
- Howie Weinberg - mastering
- Nick Moorbath - producer, mixing (15 and 18)

=== Artwork ===
- Heather Ann Law - cover design
- Matt Hunt - portraits
- Ben Morse - band photographs
- Thomas Lacey - album artwork and layout
