= Lucky Soul =

British pop band

- Origin: Greenwich, United Kingdom
- Genre: Pop
- Years active: 2005–2018
- Labels: Ruffa Lane, Sony Music Japan, Elefant
- Members: Andrew Laidlaw; Ivor Sims; Ali Howard; Russell Grooms; Paul Atkins; Art Terry
- Past members: Nathaniel Perkins; Toby Fogell; Malcolm Young
- Website: LuckySoul.co.uk

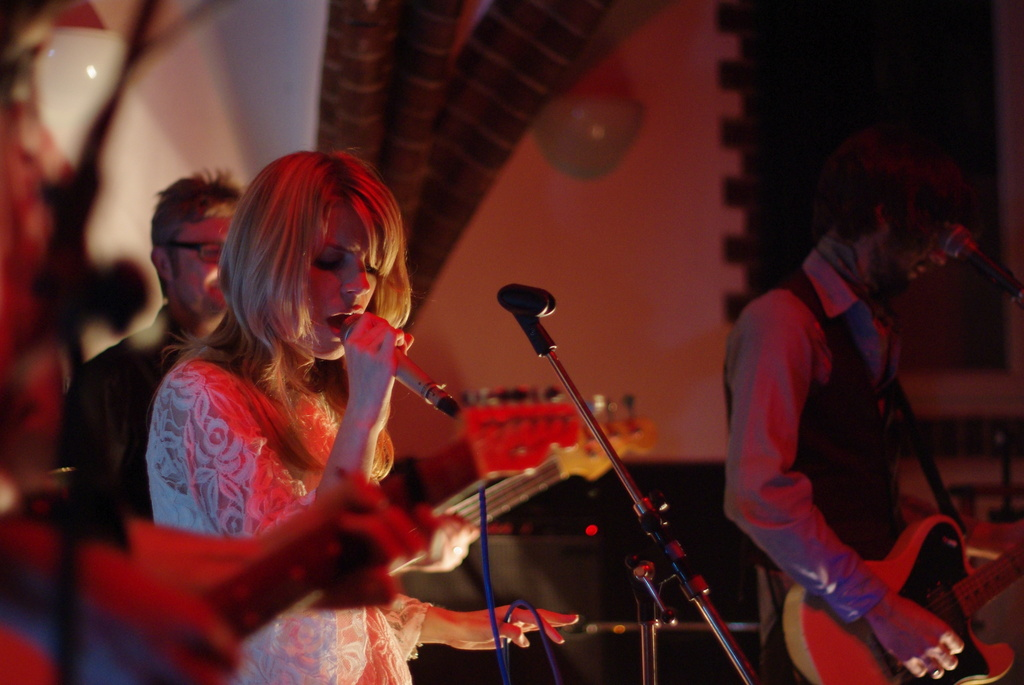

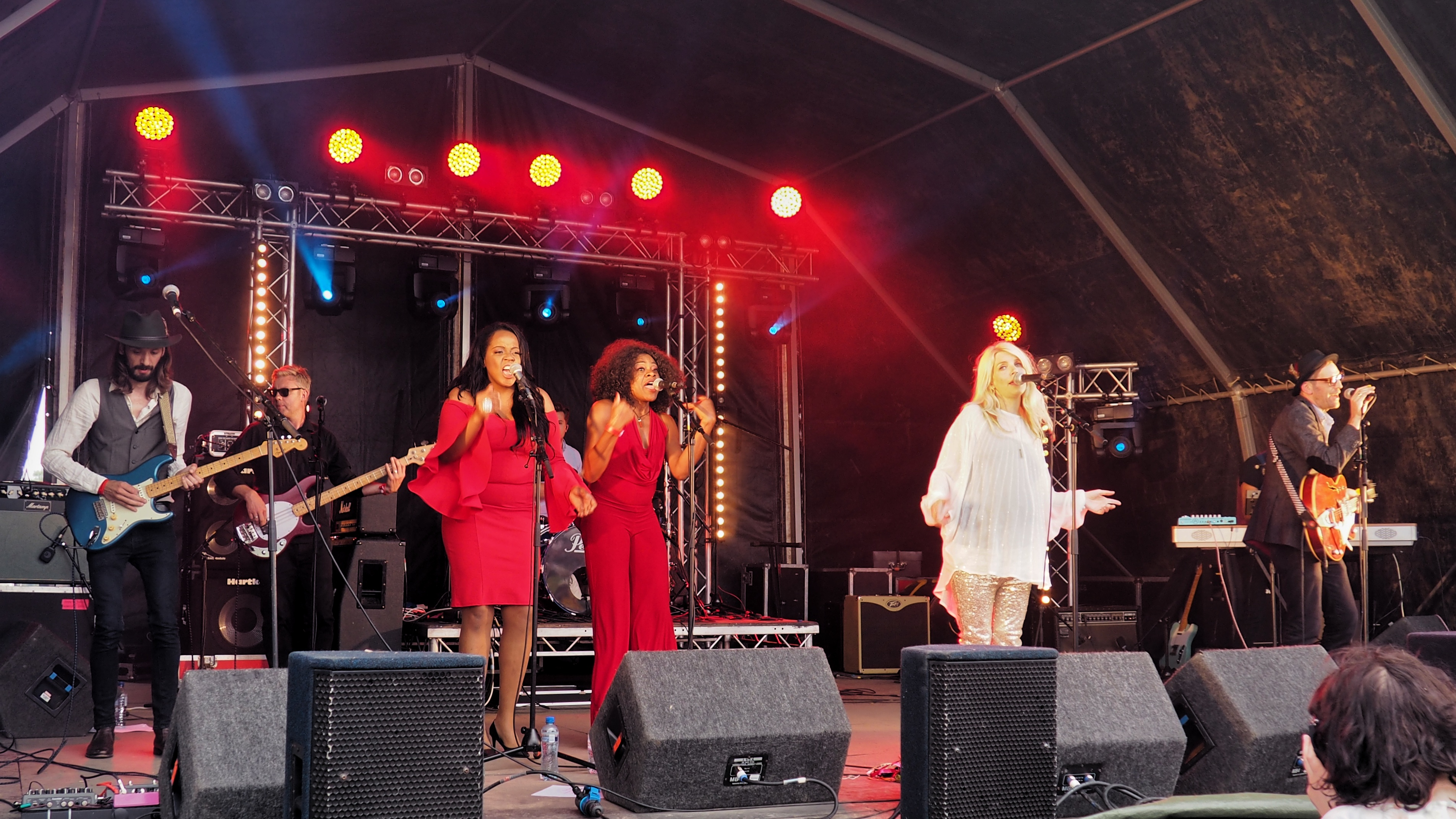

Lucky Soul were a British six-piece pop band based in South East London. Formed in 2005, the band consisted of Ali Howard on vocals, Andrew Laidlaw and Ivor Sims on guitars, Russell Grooms on bass and Paul Atkins on drums, and Art Terry on keys.

The band performed numerous live dates in the UK and overseas and, on 20 June 2007, were one of the first acts to perform at The O2, as part of Greenwich Council's soft launch event. They also supported Bryan Ferry on his Dylanesque tour that same year. They have toured in Spain, Italy, Germany, Sweden, Japan, the United States and Russia, where they performed at the Kinotavr Film Festival in Sochi.

After a seven-year hiatus, they announced their return with their third album, Hard Lines, which was released on 11 August 2017.

== History ==
The project began when Laidlaw was a university student in Scotland. He used a sampler to produce electronic music that he likened to The Avalanches and Saint Etienne. After moving to London with Nathaniel Perkins, he recruited additional musicians including Sims. Following their departure, Howard joined after responding to a newspaper ad.

Their debut single "My Brittle Heart"/"Give Me Love", released in March 2006, was made Single of the Week by The Guardian newspaper, who described it as featuring "melodies as colossal, memorable and irresistible as a stampede of elephants bearing down on your tent". In June of that year they released another single, "Lips Are Unhappy", now famed as the music for the Clas Ohlson TV ads in Sweden. The summer of 2006 also saw "Give Me Love" featured on How Does It Feel To Be Loved?'s "Kids At The Club" compilation.

This was followed by an EP entitled "Ain't Never Been Cool" in early 2007. "Ain't Never Been Cool" achieved recognition by being featured on BBC Radio 1 DJ Colin Murray's top 20 tracks of the year. A further single, "Add Your Light to Mine, Baby", was released on 26 March 2007 as a digital download, on CD and as a limited edition, hand-numbered vinyl, followed by "One Kiss Don't Make a Summer" in early September.

The band's debut album, The Great Unwanted, was released on 9 April 2007. Produced by George Shilling, it had a five star review in Metro and The Independent on Sunday, four stars from both The Guardian and The Times and a further four star review in Uncut magazine.

The group's second album, entitled A Coming of Age, was released on 15 April 2010. The song "Woah Billy!" was released digitally in April 2009. In January 2010, the band released a second song off the album, "White Russian Doll".

Their third album, entitled Hard Lines, was released on 11 August 2017. The first single from the album, "No Ti Amo", was released in June 2017.

== Discography ==
=== Singles ===
Single	Release date
"My Brittle Heart"/"Give Me Love"	20 March 2006
"Lips are Unhappy"	June 2006
"Ain't Never Been Cool"	16 January 2007
"Add Your Light to Mine, Baby"	9 March 2007
"One Kiss Don't Make a Summer"	3 September 2007
"Lips Are Unhappy"/"Lonely This Christmas"	17 December 2007 (download)
"White Russian Doll"	11 January 2010
"Woah Billy!"	11 April 2010
"Up in Flames"	1 August 2010
"No Ti Amo"	June 2017

=== Albums ===
Album	Release date
The Great Unwanted	9 April 2007
A Coming of Age	15 April 2010
Hard Lines	11 August 2017
