= Wilt (Irish band) =

Irish alternative rock band

- Origin: Kilkenny, Ireland
- Genre: Alternative rock
- Years active: 1998–2003
- Past members: Cormac Battle; Darragh Butler; Mick Murphy
- Website: Facebook

Wilt were an alternative rock band founded in Kilkenny, Ireland in 1998. Formed by ex-Kerbdog members Cormac Battle on vocals/guitar and Darragh Butler on drums, the line-up was completed with their friend Mick Murphy on bass.

Wilt played their first gig at The Funnel in Dublin on 26 March 1998. Their debut album, Bastinado, was released in July 2000. Wexford native Derren Dempsey joined on guitar/backing vocals as a live touring member in 2002 to promote their second album, My Medicine.

Although Rock Sound magazine tipped them as being Ireland's version of Hüsker Dü and Weezer, Wilt broke up in 2003.

== Discography ==
=== Studio Albums ===
Bastinado

Studio album by Wilt
- Released: 10 July 2000
- Recorded: 1998–1999 at Sun Studios, Dublin
- Genre: Alternative rock
- Label: Mushroom Records UK
- Producer: Ronan McHugh

Wilt chronology
''Bastinado'' (2000)	My Medicine (2002)

My Medicine

Studio album by Wilt
- Released: 15 July 2002
- Recorded: 2001 at RAK Studios, London
- Genre: Alternative rock
- Label: Mushroom Records UK
- Producer: Dave Eringa

Wilt chronology
Bastinado (2000)	My Medicine (2002)

Professional ratings
Review scores
Source	Rating
Amazon.co.uk	(4.6/5)

Year	Title	Label	Track list	Irish Chart	UK Chart
2000	Bastinado	Mushroom	1. It’s All Over Now; 2. Radio Disco; 3. Open Arms; 4. I Found Out; 5. No Worries; 6. Goodnight; 7. Never A Friend; 8. Working For The Man; 9. Peroxatine; 10. Moving On; 11. Expedestrians; 12. Radio Disco (Fanning Session) (CD2); 13. No Worries (Evening Session) (CD2); 14. Peroxatine (Fanning Session) (CD2); 15. Open Arms (XFM Acoustic) (CD2); 16. Moving On (XFM Acoustic) (CD2)	21	150
2002	My Medicine	Mushroom	1. Distortion; 2. Understand; 3. Take Me Home; 4. My Medicine; 5. Stations; 6. Dave You Were Right; 7. Tell You Too Much; 8. Family Man; 9. Wait A Minute; 10. Broken Glass; 11. The Plan	15	98

=== Singles and EPs ===
Year	Title	Label	Track list	UK Chart
1998	No Worries	Discordant	1. I Want It All; 2. Working For The Man; 3. I Want It All	180
1999	It’s All Over Now	Mushroom	1. It’s All Over Now; 2. Working For The Man; 3. Never Enough	86
2000	Radio Disco	Mushroom	1. Radio Disco; 2. The Party’s Over (CD1); 3. Headline News (CD1); 4. My Kind of Girl (CD2); 5. Bette Davis (CD2)	56
2000	Open Arms	Mushroom	1. Open Arms; 2. No Worries (XFM Session) (CD1); 3. Mansion on the Hill (CD1); 4. Never A Friend (XFM Session) (CD2); 5. Mercy Seat (CD2); 6. Radio Disco (XFM Session) (7”)	59
2000	No Worries (re-issue)	Mushroom	1. No Worries (re-recording); 2. Flutter (CD1); 3. Expedestrians (Evening Session) (CD1); 4. April Skies (Evening Session) (CD2); 5. No Worries (Evening Session) (CD2)	83
2002	Take Me Home	Mushroom	1. Take Me Home; 2. Tell You Too Much; 3. Penny Black	76
2002	Distortion	Mushroom	1. Distortion; 2. Tonic (CD1); 3. Major Condition (CD1); 4. Two Steps To The Sun (CD2); 5. Patience (CD2); 6. I Want It All (Fanning Session) (7”)	66
2003	Understand (UK Promo)	Mushroom	1. Understand	N/A

Other

Year	Title	Label	Wilt Song
2003	emBraces (Various Artists)	Origin Records	The Plan (Galway Bay FM Session)

Radio Sessions

Date	Radio Station	Session	Track list
19.9.99	XFM	Acoustic Session	1. Open Arms; 2. Moving On; more?
21.12.99	BBC Radio One	Evening Session	1. Radio Disco; 2. April Skies; 3. Expedestrians; 4. No Worries
18.3.00	RTE 2FM	Dave Fanning Session	1. Radio Disco; 2. Peroxatine; 3. Never A Friend; 4. I Want It All
19.3.00	XFM	XFM Session	1. Radio Disco; 2. No Worries; 3. Never A Friend
2002	Total Rock Radio	Diamond Dave Session	1. Distortion; 2. Understand; 3. My Medicine; 4. Take Me Home; 5. Stations
2002	Galway Bay FM	Galway Bay FM Session	1. The Plan; more?

=== Covered songs featured on their singles ===
- "April Skies" – Jesus And Mary Chain
- "Mercy Seat" – Ultra Vivid Scene
- "Mansion on the Hill" – Bruce Springsteen
