= Pledge: A Tribute to Kerbdog =

Compilation album by Various Artists
- Released: March 8, 2010
- Genre: Alternative rock
- Label: Stressed Sumo Records

Kerbdog was an Alternative rock band from Kilkenny, Ireland who formed in 1991. Following two albums released on Mercury Records, the band split up in 1998. Between 2005 and 2008 the band reformed for a series of one-off performances in Ireland and England, with no further reformations planned.

A tribute album entitled Pledge: A Tribute To Kerbdog was released on March 8, 2010.

== Track listing ==
1. Cars On Fire - Pledge (4:05)
2. Left Side Brain - Severed (4:14)
3. Dutch Shultz - Hard To Live (3:25)
4. Frank Turner - Sally (4:39)
5. Mike Got Spiked - Dry Riser (4:47)
6. Days Of Worth - Didn't Even Try (3:56)
7. Stations - Schism (3:43)
8. Jamie Lenman - Mexican Wave (4:10)
9. Knievel Genius - Inseminator (3:57)
10. Hold Your Horse Is - Secure (3:46)
11. Dave McPherson - J.J.'s Song (5:10)
12. Ocean Bottom Nightmare - On The Turn (4:19)
13. Dry Riser - Dragging Through (4:57)
