= Losing Days =

EP by Frank Turner
- Released: 1 September 2013
- Genre: Folk
- Label: Xtra Mile Recordings

Frank Turner chronology
Tape Deck Heart (2013)	Losing Days (2013)	Polaroid Picture (EP) (2014)

Losing Days is an EP released by Frank Turner on September 1, 2013 via Xtra Mile. Losing Days was the third single from Turner's fourth studio album Tape Deck Heart. The other three songs on this EP were recorded during the Tape Deck Heart sessions.

== Track listing ==
No.	Title	Length
1.	"Losing Days"	3:32
2.	"Hits & Mrs"	3:13
3.	"Longing for the Day"	4:39
4.	"Who's Got a Match" (Biffy Clyro cover)	3:13
