= England Keep My Bones =

Studio album by Frank Turner
- Released: 6 June 2011
- Recorded: January 2011
- Studio: The Church
- Genres: Folk rock, folk punk
- Length: 44:14
- Labels: Xtra Mile, Epitaph
- Producer: Tristan Ivemy

Frank Turner chronology
Rock & Roll (2010)	England Keep My Bones (2011)	The Second Three Years (2011)

Singles from England Keep My Bones
- 1. "I Still Believe" Released: 28 October 2010; 2. "Peggy Sang the Blues" Released: 25 April 2011; 3. "If Ever I Stray" Released: 29 August 2011; 4. "Wessex Boy" Released: 12 December 2011

England Keep My Bones is the fourth studio album by London-based singer-songwriter Frank Turner, released on 6 June 2011, on Xtra Mile in the United Kingdom, and on 7 June 2011, on Epitaph Records worldwide. Preceded by the single, "Peggy Sang the Blues", the album was produced and mixed by Tristan Ivemy, who had previously mixed Love, Ire and Song, Rock & Roll and Campfire Punkrock.

The album's title is taken from William Shakespeare's play, The Life and Death of King John, with Turner noting, "I knew that the album was, for the most part, about mortality, and about Englishness. Shakespeare seemed like a good place to go hunting for some pearls of wisdom, and with a little help from my friend Ben we came across this one, and it just seemed to fit the work really well."

== Background and recording ==
Amidst extensive touring in support of Poetry of the Deed, Turner and his then-untitled backing band recorded Rock & Roll, an EP consisting of tracks written at the same time as Poetry of the Deed alongside new material. Following its release, Turner and the band spent twenty days in January 2011, recording their next studio album with producer Tristan Ivemy. Turner noted, "I guess we worked pretty fast by most measures, but it wasn’t ever rushed, it was a really comfortable recording experience actually. We did an awful lot of pre-production and demoing, so I felt very ready to make the album once the time finally rolled around."

== Writing and composition ==
Prior to the album's release, Turner noted that his growing commercial success had influenced his lyrical content, stating, "I could still write songs pretending to be the underdog kid, but it's just not really true anymore." Turner also noted that one of the major themes of the album is that of "English national identity," stating, "it's something that I want to write songs about. I, quite self-consciously, want to make music that sounds English."

Regarding the album's overall aesthetic, Turner notes, "it's not a radical departure, just maybe a little deeper ploughed into the same furrow," and stated, prior to its release, "I'm very pleased with it, I think I achieved what I set out to do, which was to make a record that falls equally between Love Ire & Song and Poetry of the Deed. The songs sound very strong to me."

Turner commented on the atheist nature of closing track, "Glory Hallelujah", stating, "I have played many Christian songs on stage in my time, and have no issue with that; but one time I was singing “May the Circle Be Unbroken” onstage in Atlanta, with Chuck Ragan, and it occurred to me that it'd be nice if there was a concomitant atheist song, with the same feel, to put the other side of the argument."

== The Sleeping Souls ==
Following the completion of the album, Turner subsequently announced his backing band had named themselves The Sleeping Souls, after a lyric in the track, "I Am Disappeared". Regarding their contributions, Turner noted, "they arrange with me, and there’s a clear distinction. Basically I turn up with songs that are finished to the extent that they have verses, choruses, middle eights, chord progressions and vocals. I generally have some ideas about what I want people to do. People will suggest a guitar or piano line, but I retain power of veto. It’s a dictatorship, rather than a democracy. To be honest, without getting too precious about this, I pay them to be in my band. I don’t want to be in a band, if I did then I'd do that. This is my project." Turner had previously stated, "I made [the album] with my band, but it feels like more of a solo record than Poetry of the Deed," and further elaborated, "Last time round, I think I was a little excited about having a stable band line-up to take into the studio; also, we worked out all the arrangements in about two weeks of intensive rehearsal. As a result the feel tended towards the rock end of the spectrum and it became a band record – which is fine, but it’s definitely in the side field of what I want to do. This time we were all on tour together pretty much the whole time when I was writing, which meant we had much longer to work on arrangements, plus I was more confident in not using people on some songs, as opposed to just throwing everything on all the time."

== Reception ==
Professional ratings
Aggregate scores
Source	Rating
Metacritic	77/100
Review scores
Source	Rating
AbsolutePunk	89%
AllMusic	4/5 stars
BBC	(Positive)
BLARE Magazine	4/5 stars
Clash	5/10
NME	8/10
Paste	8.4/10
PopMatters	7/10
Spin	8/10
SputnikMusic	4.5/5

England Keeps My Bones was met with "generally favorable" reviews from critics. At Metacritic, which assigns a weighted average rating out of 100 to reviews from mainstream publications, this release received an average score of 77 based on 14 reviews.

NME described the release as "a fearless venture for an artist with something interesting to say." Paste placed it at number 50 on their "Top 50 Albums of 2011" list.

== Track listing ==
All tracks are written by Frank Turner, except where noted.

No.	Title	Length
1.	"Eulogy"	1:34
2.	"Peggy Sang the Blues"	3:33
3.	"I Still Believe"	3:47
4.	"Rivers"	4:34
5.	"I Am Disappeared"	4:47
6.	"English Curse"	2:17
7.	"One Foot Before the Other"	3:26
8.	"If Ever I Stray" (Frank Turner, Nigel Powell)	2:54
9.	"Wessex Boy" (Turner, Powell)	3:34
10.	"Nights Become Days"	4:26
11.	"Redemption"	4:48
12.	"Glory Hallelujah"	4:30
Total length:		44:14

Bonus tracks
No.	Title	Length
13.	"Song for Eva Mae"	3:43
14.	"Wanderlust"	3:13
15.	"Balthazar, Impresario"	4:01

iTunes Bonus tracks
No.	Title	Length
13.	"Song for Eva Mae"	3:43
14.	"Wanderlust"	3:13
15.	"Balthazar, Impresario"	4:01
16.	"Peggy Sang The Blues (Acoustic)"	3;24
17.	"I Still Believe (Acoustic)"	3;41
18.	"I Am Disappeared (Acoustic)"	4:21

=== Editions ===
- Standard CD
- Deluxe CD which included a signed poster for the 1st 1000 copies.
- 12" Vinyl available in green or black
- iTunes LP

== Singles ==
"I Still Believe" was released as the first single from the album (and the single from Rock & Roll EP) on 28 October 2010. This was followed by the song "Peggy Sang The Blues", Frank's tribute to his Grandma on 25 May 2011. It was then announced on 28 July 2011 that "If Ever I Stray" would be released as the album's third single. It was backed by b-side "Sailor's Boots" (previously known as "Rod Stewart") and released on 29 August 2011.

== Chart performance ==
Chart performance for England Keep My Bones
Chart (2011)	Peak position
Dutch Albums (Album Top 100)	94
Dutch Alternative Albums (MegaCharts)	10
Scottish Albums (Official Charts)	20
UK Albums (Official Charts)	12
UK Independent Albums (Official Charts)	5
US Billboard 200	143
US Americana/Folk Albums (Billboard)	8
US Heatseekers Albums (Billboard)	4
US Independent Albums (Billboard)	25
US Top Rock Albums (Billboard)	49

== Certifications ==
Region	Certification	Certified units/sales
United Kingdom (BPI)	Gold	100,000^{‡}
^{‡} Sales+streaming figures based on certification alone.

== Personnel ==
Credits adapted from Allmusic.

Frank Turner & The Sleeping Souls

- Frank Turner – lead vocals, acoustic guitar, harmonica
- Ben Lloyd – electric guitar, mandolin, vocals
- Tarrant Anderson – bass guitar
- Matt Nasir – piano, organ, keyboards, string arrangements, vocals
- Nigel Powell – drums, percussion, mandolin, vocals

Additional musicians

- Chris T-T – additional vocals on "Rivers"
- Franz Nicolay – additional vocals on "Wessex Boy", Accordion on "Rivers"
- Joanna Ashmore - backing vocals
- Emily Barker - choir and chorus vocals, backing vocals
- Brad Barrett - backing vocals
- Beans On Toast - handclaps
- Paul Butler - brass arrangements, cornet, trumpet
- Evan Cotter - handclaps, vocals, backing vocals
- Neil Elliott - brass arrangement
- Kyle Evans - choir and chorus vocals
- Jonny Griffiths - tenor saxophone
- Lauren Halsey - handclaps, vocals, backing vocals
- Ed Harcourt - handclaps, vocals, backing vocals
- Jenna Hone - choir and chorus vocals
- Anna Jenkins - fiddle, backing vocals
- Adam Killip - handclaps, vocals, backing vocals
- Jamie Lenman - choir and chorus vocals
- Jo Silverston - cello, backing vocals
- John Warner - tenor horn
- Ben Whyntie - trombone
- Andy Yorke - choir and chorus vocals
- Rob S - lyrical assistance

Additional personnel

- Tristan Ivemy - production, mixing
- Dean Simpson - engineering
- Frank Arkwright - mastering
- Tom Lacey - artwork
- Jenny Hardcore - band photography
