= Five Thirty =

London based rock band

- Origin: Oxford, England
- Genre: Indie rock
- Years active: 1984–92
- Label: Atco/East West
- Past members: Tara Milton (vocals, bass); Paul Bassett (vocals, guitar); Phil Hopper (drums); Nick Baker (vocals, guitar); Steve Beatty (drums); Shawn Gwin (vocals, guitar); Keith McCubbin (drums)
- Website: www.five-thirty.co.uk

Five Thirty, sometimes written 5:30 and 5:30!, were a three-piece rock band from London, England, briefly popular in the early 1990s.

Tara Milton and Nick Baker formed Five Thirty whilst still at school near Oxford in 1983. They met and recruited drummer Steve Beatty and played their first official gig in May 1984. This initial line-up played a number of gigs supporting bands like The Truth, Makin' Time and Direct Hits.

Baker decided to leave the band in March 1985, and American replacement Shawn Gwin (formerly of the bands East Cambodia and The Numbers in New Orleans) was spotted advertising his services in the then popular weekly Phoenix List. They quickly recorded a demo of Gwin's songs "Weight of the World", "Catcher in the Rye", "Mood Suite" and "Suburban Town". After Gwin left to return to New Orleans (and before Paul Bassett took over the reins) Five Thirty released their demo on 12" vinyl "Catcher in the Rye", was also included on a compilation entitled The Cutting Edge, a mod revival vinyl record that also contained songs by Purple Hearts, The Blades and The Dansette. Paul Bassett took over on guitar and vocals after Gwin left. Eventually, the original drummer Steve Beatty was replaced by Keith McCubbin and finally Phil Hopper. This line-up (Milton/Bassett/Hopper) then signed to Atco/East West Records in 1990 and released four singles and one album, Bed (released 19 August 1991). The band disbanded in 1992. They also contributed a cover version of "My Sweet Lord" to the anti-poll tax album Alvin Lives (in Leeds).

Hopper went on to a career in acting, Bassett re-emerged soon after the split with Orange Deluxe, shortly followed by Milton forming The Nubiles in 1995.

In 2013, the album Bed was re-released by British independent record label 3 Loop Music as a double CD, which included B-sides, demos, radio session tracks and the Air Conditioned Nightmare EP.

In December 2014, Cherry Red Records released Millions Like Us (The Story of the Mod Revival 1977-1989) which included the original 1985 version of "Catcher in the Rye".

== Discography ==
=== Albums ===
- Bed (East West/Atco, 1991) UK No. 57

=== Tracklist ===
A1	Supernova	4:24
A2	Psycho Cupid	2:44
A3	Junk Male	3:00
A4	13th Disciple	4:28
A5	Strange Kind Of Urgency	4:25
B1	You	4:30
B2	Songs And Paintings	3:51
B3	Womb With A View	3:44
B4	Automatons	4:41
B5	Wrapped In Blue	1:32

=== Singles ===
Release date	Single	Peak Chart Position
Release date	Single	UK
1985	"Catcher in the Rye"	–
9 July 1990	"Abstain" B1 You B2 Catcher in the rye B3 Coming up for air	No. 75
5 November 1990	"Air Conditioned Nightmare" B1 Judy Jones B2 Mistress Daydream B3 The things that turn you on	No. 100
13 May 1991	"13th Disciple" B1 Hate male B2 Out to get in B3 Come together	No. 67
22 July 1991	"Super Nova" B1 Still life B2 Something's got to give	No. 75
21 October 1991	"You (EP)" B1 Cuddly drug B2 Slow train into the ocean	No. 72
