= Sally (Kerbdog song) =

Single by Kerbdog

from the album On the Turn
- Released: September 30, 1996
- Recorded: Summer 1995 at Sound City Studios and A&M Studios, Los Angeles, California, United States
- Genre: Alternative rock
- Label: Fontana Records; KERCD2 / 578 435-2 (CD1); KERDD2 / 578 437-2 (CD2); KERCC2 / 578 439-2 (CD3)
- Songwriter(s): Cormac Battle; Darragh Butler; Colin Fennelly; Billy Dalton
- Producer(s): GGGarth

Kerbdog singles chronology
"JJ's Song" (1996)	"Sally" (1996)	"Mexican Wave" (1997)

"Sally" is a song by Kerbdog, released as a single on September 30, 1996, taken from their 1995 album On the Turn that was recorded in 1995 by GGGarth at Sound City Studios and A&M Studios in Los Angeles. The single was released on three different CD singles, each with two different B-sides, all of which were recorded in 1996 by Pete Hofman. A promo video for "Sally" was also filmed in London.

== Track listings ==
=== CD1 ===
KERCD2

1. "Sally" - 3:57
2. "My Acquaintance" - 3:06
3. "Retro Ready" - 3:15

=== CD2 ===
KERDD2

1. "Sally" - 3:57
2. "Dyed in the Wool" - 5:24
3. "Spence" - 3:32

=== CD3 ===
KERCC2

1. "Sally" - 3:57
2. "Dragging Through" - 2:41
3. "The Fear" - 4:32

== Promos ==
There was also a CD DJ promo (KERCJ2)

1. Sally (Radio Edit)
2. Sally (Album Version)

== Chart performance ==
"Sally" entered the UK singles charts on 12 October 1996 and peaked after one week.

Chart (1996)	Peak position
UK Music Week Top 75 Singles	69
