= Andy Yorke =

English musician (born 1972)

- Born: 1972
- Origin: Oxford, England
- Genre: Acoustic rock
- Occupations: Musician, singer-songwriter
- Instruments: vocals, guitar
- Years active: 1993–present
- Labels: Chocolate Lab, Aktiv
- Member of: Unbelievable Truth

Andy Yorke (born 1972) is an English musician best known as the lead singer and guitarist for the band Unbelievable Truth. He is the younger brother of the Radiohead singer Thom Yorke.

== Biography ==
Yorke began singing when he was ten. At the age of sixteen, Yorke met Nigel Powell at Abingdon School, with whom he would eventually form the band Unbelievable Truth. The name of the band was inspired by Hal Hartley's 1989 movie of the same name. At this time, Yorke also began learning Russian. He travelled to the Soviet Union in 1987, at the age of 15.

Yorke studied Russian at university, and spent a year living in Moscow during 1992–1993. He returned to Moscow in 1996 to work as a translator for Greenpeace. He went back to university in 2000 to study Russian politics and business, and had been working in that field until returning to the recording studio to begin work on his debut solo album, Simple. In 2014, he completed a PhD in Government at the London School of Economics.

Yorke married in 2008.

== Career ==
=== Unbelievable Truth (1993–2000) ===
Unbelievable Truth were a three-piece band from Oxford, with Yorke on lead guitar and vocals. The band signed a record deal with Virgin and released their debut album Almost Here in 1998.

In 2000, they released their second album sorrythankyou on Shifty Disco, the same Oxford independent label that released their first single. This album received mixed reviews from critics and failed to make any commercial inroads. That same year, Yorke left the group to go back to work involving Russia. A double live and B-sides album, Misc. Music, was subsequently released in 2001.

On 19 February 2005, at Oxford's Zodiac, Unbelievable Truth reunited for a single show where they played fifteen songs as a tribute to victims of the Asian tsunami that had hit India and Thailand in late 2004. They also reformed briefly to play the final night at the Zodiac in May 2007, before it closed down to be converted into a Carling Academy venue.

=== Simple (2007–present) ===
Andy Yorke released a solo album called Simple on 14 July 2008. Live shows in support of his solo material have featured former Unbelievable Truth members as backing musicians.

=== Collaborations ===
In 2009, Andy recorded a cover of the Miracle Legion song "All for the Best" with his brother Thom for the compilation Ciao My Shining Star: The Songs of Mark Mulcahy.

== Discography ==
=== Albums ===
- Simple (2008), Aktiv Records (UK), Chocolate Lab Records (US), Vinyl Junkie (JP)

=== Singles ===
- "Rise and Fall" (6 May 2007)
1. Rise and Fall (3.30)
2. Bring You Home (2.20)
- "One in a Million" (13 October 2008)
1. One in a Million (4.15)
2. Roses (3.25)
3. Twist of the Knife (3.33)

== See also ==
- List of Old Abingdonians
