= Almost Here (Unbelievable Truth album) =

Studio album by Unbelievable Truth
- Released: 11 May 1998
- Studio: Great Linford Manor, Buckinghamshire; Nigel Powell's house
- Genre: Soft rock
- Length: 42:05
- Label: Virgin
- Producer: Nigel Powell; Jeremy Wheatley

Unbelievable Truth chronology
Almost Here (1998)	Sorrythankyou (2000)

Almost Here is the debut studio album by English rock band Unbelievable Truth. Available on Virgin Records, catalogue number CDVX2849. Also available on MiniDisc MDV2849 / 7243 8 45155 8 4.

== Background and recording ==
Vocalist and guitarist Andy Yorke and drummer Nigel Powell met while attending school, with the latter later meeting bassist Jason Moulster through mutual friends. Yorke had been studying Russian literature abroad in Russia; while there, he wrote several songs and subsequently asked Moulster to form a band on his behalf so they could work on the material when he returned. Unbelievable Truth subsequently formed in 1993, taking their name from a Hal Hartley film. After initial performances, and despite receiving a publishing offer from Zomba Group, Yorke took several more trips to Russia over the next few years, offering himself as an interpreter. The band reformed in September 1996, signing to Virgin Records in March 1997, and getting a publishing deal with Chrysalis Music.

Unbelievable Truth's debut single, "Stone", was released in mid-1997, and was promoted with supporting slots for Beth Orton, Sparklehorse and the Sundays. Almost Here was recorded at Great Linford Manor in Buckinghamshire and Powell's house. Powell acted as the producer, with Jeremy Wheatley co-producing the sessions. The latter also served as the engineer for the whole album, with Andy Lovegrove and Andy Shillito also engineering "Finest Little Space" and "Higher Than Reason", respectively. Powell did some additional engineering, with Ady Winman assisting at Great Linford Manor. Wheatley mixed the recordings at Olympic Studios in London with assistant engineer Wayne Wilkins.

== Composition and lyrics ==
Musically, the sound of Almost Here has been described as soft rock. AllMusic reviewer Stephen Thomas Erlewine referred to it as an "alluringly moody record, similar to the epic soundscapes" of Radiohead and the Verve, "only with a bit of a country-rock underpinning". PopMatters founder Sarah Zupko wrote that it "relies on largely acoustic arrangements and intricate dynamics", with influences from emo and Dog Man Star (1994) by Suede. Yorke said the music is typically written first with the lyrics coming last; Powell said he would take each individual's part and coalesce them together to form a complete song. String instrumentation was added to the various recordings by other musicians: Sharon Warnes (violin on "Angel", "Same Mistakes" and "Building"); Olivier Bonnici (violin on "Angel" and "Building"); Philip Heyman (viola on "Angel" and "Building"); and William Bruce (cello on "Solved", "Angel" and "Stone"). "Solved" and "Settle Down" had the most similarities to Radiohead, with the former not sounding out of place from the material on their third studio album OK Computer (1997). "Higher Than Reason" evoked the sound of Jeff Buckley and Nick Drake.

== Release ==
To promote the "Higher Than Reason" single, the band went on a UK tour in November 1997. Jim Crosskey assisted the band for their live shows, playing guitars and keyboards. In February 1998, they went on another UK tour. "Higher Than Reason" was released as a single in the US on 2 February 1998. Almost Here was released through Virgin Records on 11 May 1998. The band promoted it with a launch show at the Virgin Megastore in Oxford, prior to a UK tour for the rest of the month. Shortly afterwards, they appeared at T in the Park and Glastonbury Festival. Almost Here was issued in the US on 20 October 1998. Between October and December 1998, the band supported Tori Amos on her cross-country tour of the US.

== Reception ==
Professional ratings
Review scores
Source	Rating
AllMusic	4/5 stars
The Independent	4/5
NME	4/10
Pitchfork	5/10
PopMatters	7/10 stars

Erlewine said Yorke's lyricism can be viewed as "adolescent and the Unbelievable Truth's ambition often outweighs their accomplishments, but the promise they flaunt on their debut proves that they are almost there". Zupko added to this, saying that the band had "sculpted a set of compelling, introspective songs that form a cohesive artistic statement". The Independent writer Angela Lewis saw it as a "true beaut of a debut album [...] with 11 arresting songs that eschew everything the Cool Britannia party has to offer". Pitchfork writer Brent DiCrescenzo said they perform "sylvan, introspective soft-rock that's pretty and pleasant, but too mono-emotional (read: sad)". MTV's Kim Stitzel called it "restrained, mild, kinda pretty, and overwhelmingly inoffensive". Victoria Segal of NME went further by writing that it was "supernaturally dull, vaporised by its earnestness" and that it was "useful only as road music for somnambulists, 'Almost Here' will knock you out. Cold."

Several reviews compared it to Radiohead; Segal wrote that the band had "enough of a resemblance to Radiohead - serious, sensitive, the usual - to make it unavoidable". DiCrescenzo was not surprised that the band "sounds like a watered-down Radiohead", though felt that Andy Yorke lacked the "intensity, tension, and questionable sanity" of Thom Yorke. Tim Mohr of Consumable Online dismissed this comparison, stating that the band "don't sound remotely similar to Radiohead", being more inline with Arnold and Crowded House. He goes on to say Andy Yorke's vocal "style is completely his own and shows no trace of Thom". CMJ New Music Monthly's David Jarman wrote that the album "reveals a promising band that doesn't need to ride on anyone's coattails", though did admit that Yorke "shares some vocal tics with his brother – a lilting tenor, a fondness for quivering and hurt phrasing". Spin writer Tracey Pepper said Yorke "asserts his independence [from his brother Thom] with a more acoustic sound and lyrics far removed from android paranoia."

== Track listing ==
All songs written by Jason Moulster, Nigel Powell and Andy Yorke. All lyrics by Yorke.

No.	Title	Length
1.	"Solved"	3:48
2.	"Angel"	3:50
3.	"Stone"	3:38
4.	"Same Mistakes"	3:03
5.	"Forget About Me"	3:59
6.	"Settle Down"	3:14
7.	"Finest Little Space"	4:24
8.	"Building"	5:04
9.	"Almost Here"	4:09
10.	"Higher Than Reason"	4:02
11.	"Be Ready"	2:53
Total length:		42:05

Bonus track on Japanese edition
No.	Title	Length
4.	"From This Height"	4:08

== Personnel ==
Personnel per booklet.

Unbelievable Truth

- Andy Yorke – lead vocals, guitar
- Nigel Powell – drums, keyboards, guitar, backing vocals
- Jason Moulster – bass guitar, guitar, backing vocals

Additional musicians

- Sharon Warnes – violin (tracks 2, 4 and 8)
- Olivier Bonnici – violin (tracks 2 and 8)
- Philip Heyman – viola (tracks 2 and 8)
- William Bruce – cello (tracks 1–3)

Production and design

- Nigel Powell – producer, additional engineering
- Jeremy Wheatley – co-producer, mixing, engineer
- Andy Lovegrove – engineer (track 7)
- Andy Shillito – engineer (track 10)
- Ady Winman – assistant engineer
- Wayne Wilkins – assistant engineer
- Struktur Design – sleeve
- John Spinks – sleeve
