= Simple (album) =

Studio album by Andy Yorke
- Released: 14 July 2008
- Genre: Rock

Singles from Simple
- 1. "Rise and Fall" Released: 6 May 2007; 2. "One in a Million" Released: 13 October 2008

Simple is the debut solo album by Oxford singer-songwriter Andy Yorke, released in 2008.

== Track listing ==
1. "Simple" - 3:51
2. "Found the Road" - 3:13
3. "Twist of the Knife" - 3:34
4. "Rise and Fall" - 3:36
5. "Diamant" - 3:50
6. "One in a Million" - 4:16
7. "Always by Your Side" - 3:17
8. "Let It Be True" - 3:54
9. "Mathilda" - 3:48
10. "Lay Down" - 4:14
11. "Surrender" - 3:59
12. "Ode to a Friend" - 3:37
