= Kerbdog (album) =

Studio album by Kerbdog
- Released: 28 March 1994
- Recorded: Summer 1993
- Studio: Rockfield (Monmouthshire, Wales)
- Genre: Alternative metal
- Length: 37:31
- Label: Vertigo
- Producer: Jack Endino

Kerbdog chronology
Kerbdog (1994)	On The Turn (1997)

Professional ratings
Review scores
Source	Rating
AllMusic	3/5 stars

Kerbdog (also sometimes known as 'Totally Switched' for the US release) is Kerbdog's eponymous debut album. The album was recorded in 1993 at Rockfield Studios in Wales and released on 28 March 1994 through Vertigo. Though the band had various indie influences, with bands like Sonic Youth, Fugazi and Big Black, the album ended up having a Metallica influenced proto-grunge sound. The band said that this was simply the result of getting professional equipment, and turning everything up as loud as they could. What also might account for this is the fact that grunge pioneer Jack Endino recorded the album.

"If I remember right the whole thing took five weeks. No problems except that Cormac was still writing lyrics right up to the next-to-last day of mixing. Dummy Crusher was literally the last thing finished, we cut the vocal and then I mixed it next day. We had about run out of time at that point. [I] liked almost all of it. Thought the intro to EOG should have been half as long, but band disagreed; and in retrospect I would have turned up the vocals on EOG just a teeny bit, though no one ever complained. Didn't like Xenophobia much but that didn't make the album. Thought Clock should have been a single."
Jack Endino

The album was fairly well received in Britain, Ireland, and Europe, reaching number 97 in the UK Albums Chart. It also got a lot of radio play on US college radio, but the album didn't do as well as expected.

The album was originally released on LP, CD and cassette. It was re-released on CD in September 2012 on East World Records UK.

"Kerbdog" was finally re-released on green vinyl in November 2020 on Hassle Records. There was also a clear vinyl edition, limited to 300 hand-numbered copies.

== Track listing ==
All tracks are written by Kerbdog.

Kerbdog track listing
No.	Title	Length
1.	"End of Green"	3:53
2.	"Dry Riser"	3:59
3.	"Dead Anyway"	3:58
4.	"Cleaver"	3:24
5.	"Earthworks"	4:11
6.	"Dummy Crusher"	3:19
7.	"The Inseminator"	3:28
8.	"Clock"	4:10
9.	"Schism"	3:55
10.	"Scram"	3:17
Total length:		37:31

"Xenophobia" and "Self-Inflicted" from the album sessions were later used as b-sides for the Dry Riser single.

== Personnel ==
- Cormac Battle - Guitar, Vocals
- Darragh Butler - Drums
- Billy Dalton - Guitar
- Colin Fennelly - Bass
- Jack Endino - Producer, Engineer, Mixing
- Phil Ault - Assistant Producer, Assistant Engineer, Mixing Assistant
- Simon Fowler - Photography
- Freddie Sodima - Art Direction
- Patrick Siemer - Design, Photography

== UK Singles ==
- Earthworks (demo version) (1993)
- End Of Green (1993)
- Dry Riser (1994) #60
- Dummy Crusher (1994) #37
