= Rock & Roll (EP) =

EP by Frank Turner
- Released: 6 December 2010
- Recorded: September 2010 at The Church Studios, London, England
- Genre: Folk punk, folk rock
- Length: 17:21
- Label: Xtra Mile Recordings

Frank Turner chronology
Buddies (2010)	Rock & Roll (2010)	England Keep My Bones (2011)

Rock & Roll is an EP by Frank Turner, released on 6 December 2010 on Xtra Mile Recordings. Describing the release as "a taster" for his subsequent studio album, England Keep My Bones, the EP was preceded by the single, "I Still Believe".

== Writing and composition ==
Regarding the EP's overall aesthetic, Turner noted, "If the music I make is a spectrum that has acoustic folk stuff at one end, and rock music at the other, with Poetry of the Deed the needle was over towards the rock end. That's fine to do on occasion, but I think that as a general thing I’d rather be somewhere a bit more in the middle. So that’s the idea with Rock and Roll, and with the new album as well; the idea is to pull things back a little bit."

== Track listing ==
All tracks are written by Frank Turner.

No.	Title	Length
1.	"I Still Believe"	3:47
2.	"Pass It Along"	4:07
3.	"Rock & Roll Romance"	1:50
4.	"To Absent Friends"	2:58
5.	"The Next Round"	4:39
Total length:		17:20

== Personnel ==
- Frank Turner - lead vocals, lead Guitar, mandolin
- Ben Lloyd - electric guitar
- Matt Nasir - piano, keyboards, vocals
- Tarrant Anderson - bass
- Nigel Powell - drums, percussion, vocals

Additional personnel

- Tristan Ivemy - recording, mixing
- Frank Arkwright - mastering

Artwork

- Chris Bourke - woodcuts
- Matt Nasir - photographs
- Andy Black - photographs
- Casey Cress - photographs
