= Kerbdog =

Irish rock band

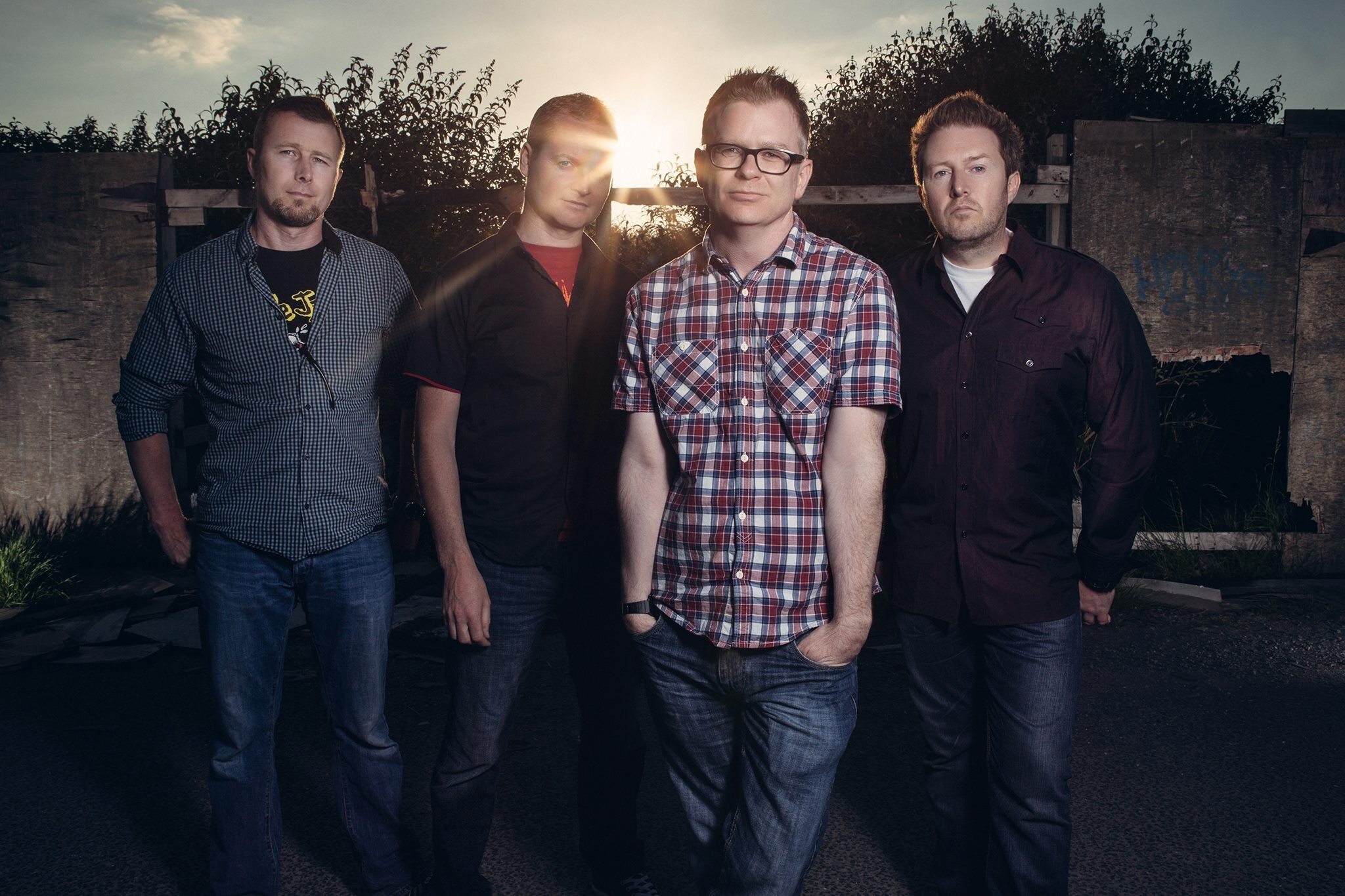
- Kerbdog, L–R: Billy Dalton, Colin Fennelly, Cormac Battle, Darragh Butler

Background information
- Origin: Kilkenny, Ireland
- Genres: Alternative metal; grunge; post-hardcore
- Years active: 1991–1998; 2005–2008 (sporadic); 2011–2016 (sporadic); 2019 (sporadic)
- Past members: Cormac Battle; Darragh Butler; Colin Fennelly; Billy Dalton

Kerbdog were an alternative metal band from Kilkenny, Ireland, formed in 1991. Following two albums released on Mercury Records, the band split up in 1998. Since 2005, they have reformed for a series of occasional one-off performances. In 2012, a live album entitled Congregation was recorded and released in October 2014.

== History ==
=== Formation (1991–1992) ===
Originally named Rollercoaster, Kerbdog were formed in 1991 by Cormac Battle (vocals/guitar), Colin Fennelly (bass guitar), and Darragh Butler (drums) while attending St Kieran's College. The band went on to obtain their Leaving Certificates, but they devoted their energies to music rather than studies. Their early live shows primarily consisted of cover versions of songs by Sonic Youth, Loop, Spacemen 3, and Fudge Tunnel. Rollercoaster spent a year in London, but they failed to win much interest from the UK music press and returned to Kilkenny.

Billy Dalton joined the band in early 1992 as a second guitarist and his fondness for heavy metal acts Metallica and Slayer complimented Battle's fascination with the British and New York City underground. They changed their name to Kerbdog in 1992.

=== Debut album (1993–1994) ===
In early 1993, Kerbdog signed with Mercury Records subsidiary Vertigo. That summer, they recorded their self-titled debut album at Rockfield Studios near Monmouth in Wales. It was produced by Jack Endino.

Whilst recording, Kerbdog were also planning a major tour of British clubs. A winter support slot on The Almighty's UK tour brought added exposure, promoted by the band's second single, "End of Green".

1994 saw another run of gigs, including a support slot with Therapy?. The debut album was released that year to acclaim, and two further singles were released, "Dry Riser" and "Dummy Crusher".

=== Second album and split (1995–1998) ===
In July 1995, the band travelled to Los Angeles to work on their second album. Produced by GGGarth, On the Turn was rehearsed at Full Blast Studios before recording was completed at Sound City Studios and A&M Studios over the following months.

Billy Dalton left Kerbdog a few months after the band returned from Los Angeles. In early 1996, the Mercury Music Group was bought over by Polygram, and Kerbdog shifted to Fontana Records, Vertigo's sister label at PolyGram. "JJ's Song" was released in July 1996 as a limited-edition EP, preceding the "Sally" single in September 1996.

The album was repeatedly delayed before being released in the UK in March 1997, preceded by the single "Mexican Wave". It sold poorly, the record label dropped the band, and their back catalogue was deleted in 1997. Kerbdog recorded a six-track demo at Sun Studios, Dublin in May 1997, with the aim of securing a new record deal. An unnamed record company (believed to have been DreamWorks Records, a subdivision of Geffen) expressed interest in bringing the band to the United States and buying the rights to On The Turn from Mercury Records; an offer was made to Mercury and rejected. Without an album to promote Kerbdog in the States, the record company declined to sign the band.

"There were two labels that wanted to sign us at the time and came to see us supporting Placebo who, the first night, we blew away and the second night they wouldn't give us the PA in Belfast, but anyway they came to see us but they couldn't afford the album. They wanted the album and had Mercury sold that album we would have kept functioning as a band and moved straight to the States, everything was pretty much in place to do that, so I would be curious to see how much it was sold for now [in 2012]. I think it was about a hundred grand Sterling put on the table for the album [in 1997] but I presume the record label [Mercury], maybe wrote it off and perhaps there is a fifteen year [legal] thing or something that it's available now again."
Darragh Butler – Irishdrummers.com, 2012

The band continued without a record label for a few months but eventually disbanded in late 1997 and played their final gigs at the Krazy Horse, Cork over Christmas 1997 and at the Mean Fiddler, Dublin on 7 March 1998.

=== Wilt (1998–2003) ===
In 1998, Cormac and Darragh, with new bassist Mick Murphy, went on to form another band, Wilt. They played their first gig at The Funnel in Dublin on 26 March 1998. Rock Sound magazine tipped them as being Ireland's version of Hüsker Dü and Weezer. However, after two albums (Bastinado and My Medicine), Wilt broke up in 2003.

=== Reformation (2005–2008, 2011–present) ===
Following Wilt's split, Kerbdog reformed in 2005. They played 13 gigs in Ireland that year, most notably two sell-out concerts in February at the Temple Bar Music Centre, Dublin, followed by a set at the Oxegen music festival in July. They continued to play occasional one-off Kilkenny and Dublin shows in both 2006 and 2007. August 2008 saw the group play the Camden Barfly in London as part of the Kerrang "Week of Rock", and a show at the "Pumpalooza" in Kilkenny in aid of the Susie Long Hospice Foundation. Dalton rejoined them on stage for seven songs during the Pumphouse gig, marking the first time since 1995 that the four-piece had played together.

A tribute album, entitled Pledge: A Tribute to Kerbdog was released on 8 March 2010, via the Derby-based record label Stressed Sumo Records.

Kerbdog played the Temple House Festival in Sligo on 11 June 2011, also playing a gig at the Set Theater in Kilkenny on New Year's Eve 2011, at which Wilt reformed for a few songs on the same night/stage.

On 7 April 2012, the band returned to the UK to play a one-off gig in Bristol, with Souls (Butler and Dalton's new band) on the same bill, to mark the 15th anniversary of the release of On the Turn. This show was the first of three recorded by Dave Draper for a future live album. In late 2012, Kerbdog also recorded their Dublin and London shows. The result, Congregation, was released on 10 October 2014 as a CD/DVD package.

On 16 June 2014, it was announced that guitarist Billy Dalton had rejoined Kerbdog after an 18-year absence. The group also announced that they would enter a recording studio in Evesham, the day prior to Sonisphere, to begin recording a track entitled "Soaking Wet", which was demoed originally in 1997. This marked the first time the band recorded studio material since the 1990s. The track, completed a few weeks later and retitled "Electricity", was included on the new live album. A 7" vinyl featuring "Electricity" and "Pointless (live)" was also made available. A Pledge campaign was unveiled on 23 June 2014 to help fund and promote the new releases. The campaign reached 100% of its goal on 6 October 2014. That same day, Kerbdog recorded a studio session for Today FM radio in Dublin, first broadcast on the Paul McLoone show in November 2014. A UK tour in support of the live album took place in November 2014.

In an interview with Irish Metal Archive in 2015, Dalton confirmed that the band had plans to release an EP, for which they had three new songs waiting to be recorded.

== Discography ==
Studio albums

- Kerbdog (1994) (UK #97)
- On the Turn (1997) (UK #64)

Live albums

- Live at Concrete (US promo – 1994)
- Congregation (2014)

Singles

- "Earthworks" (demo – 1993)
- "End of Green" (1993)
- "Dry Riser" (1994) (UK No. 60)
- "Dummy Crusher" (1994) (UK No. 37)
- "JJ's Song" (1996)
- "Sally" (1996) (UK No. 69)
- "Mexican Wave" (1997) (UK No. 49)
- "Electricity" (2014)

Soundtrack appearances

- "Dummy Crusher" – Highlander III: The Sorcerer soundtrack (1994)
- "This Is Not a Love Song" – Bordello of Blood soundtrack (1996)
