= Cormac Battle =

Irish musician and radio presenter/producer

- Born: 11 July 1972 (age 54); Bromley, England
- Education: Dublin City University
- Occupations: Musician and radio presenter
- Employer: RTÉ

Cormac Battle (born 11 July 1972) is an Irish musician and radio presenter/producer. He is the vocalist and lead guitarist for the bands Kerbdog and Wilt, . . He Started a new show on RTE Gold from 18th of May, 2026.

== Early life ==
Battle was brought up in Kilkenny, Ireland, having moved from Bromley, UK at an early age.

== Career ==
=== Music ===
In 1991 Battle, along with school friends Darragh Butler (drums), Colin Fennelly (bass) and Billy Dalton (guitar) came together to form a band called Rollercoaster before changing the name permanently to Kerbdog. Following two demo cassettes recorded in Dublin and a short support slot to Therapy? in 1992, the band was signed to Vertigo Records in London. The group released their self-titled album, produced by legendary grunge icon Jack Endino, in 1993. A second album entitled On The Turn was recorded at Sound City Studios in Los Angeles during the summer of 1995, produced by GGGarth, but the album's release was delayed for almost a year indicating troublesome times for the band with their record company. Kerbdog were soon dropped and eventually split up in 1998.

Battle and Butler immediately formed another band, along with bassist Mick Murphy, called Wilt. Their music had a greater pop influence than Kerbdog. Following the release of two albums, Bastinado and My Medicine on Infectious Records, Wilt split up in 2003 following limited success.

At this point Battle finished his degree and began to seriously focus on his DJ career and abandoned his musical pursuits. However, in 2005 Kerbdog reformed for a series of one-off shows. The band is still currently active on a part-time basis and have no plans to write or record new material. His favourite Oxegen memory is playing the festival with Kerbdog in 2005.

=== Broadcasting ===
Battle began life at Phantom FM before moving, along with colleagues Jenny Huston and Dan Hegarty, in 2003 to RTE. Battle's late night show featured new and alternative music from acts around the world as well as the 2fm sessions, live recordings, band interviews as well as from other sources. The Wireless was a supporter of the IMRO Showcase Tour. He also offered his voice to the narration of popular live music programme 2fm Live, which was broadcast on Saturday nights between 20:00 and 23:00 before it was axed and reformatted as 2fm XtrAlive. Battle regularly featured in live coverage of high-profile musical events such as Electric Picnic and Oxegen, as well as being sent around the country to present the 2fm 2moro 2our. In 2008 Battle was sent to The Music Show to distribute advice. He has appeared on BBC Introducing to discuss the state of the Irish music industry. He also contributed to many television programmes in Ireland.

Cormac was a voice of reason, as part of The Jennifer Zamparelli Show 9-12 on RTÉ 2FM.
