= Fighting Fiction =

English punk rock band

- Origin: Brighton, England
- Genres: punk rock; folk punk
- Years active: 2007–2014
- Labels: Xtra Mile Recordings
- Past members: Jacob Glew; Andrew Cooke; Matthew Roffe; Rob Ballingall; Adam Wells; Nate Davenport; Alex Davis; Jamie Carl Moody; Will Bright; Douglas Hunt

Fighting Fiction were an English punk rock band based for most of their career in Brighton, England, driven by core members Jacob Glew and Andrew Cooke.

The band received notable attention from Mike Davies (BBC Radio 1's Punk Show) and Tom Robinson (BBC Radio 6 Music) at BBC Radio, BBC Introducing, Rocksound and Big Cheese Magazine after the release of their first EP A Lesser Of Two Evils (2009), and continued to gain positive media reception beyond the release of their debut self-titled album in 2012. Fighting Fiction released their two albums on Xtra Mile Records, whose roster includes Against Me!, Frank Turner and Sonic Boom Six. The release of sophomore album The Long And Short Of It in September 2013 was followed by a sizable world tour, spanning 10 countries.

The group disbanded in March 2014.

== Discography and history ==
=== Early years, A Lesser Of Two Evils (2007–2009) ===
Fighting Fiction met whilst studying in Bath in 2007. Jacob briefly met Andrew at a party during their first week of university and, after meeting Matthew Roffe, they started writing music together under the name 'Co.jack'. Drummer Rob Ballingall joined a number of weeks later, having known Andrew through the music scene where they both grew up. Throughout 2007 the band wrote, demoed and gigged relentlessly whilst studying, focusing mainly on the southwest region of England. In the summer of 2008 the band were booked to play a small festival in Normandy, France, which is where they met their manager Matthew Wood. Wood and his London-based company, Dead Planet, would become a large part of the forward momentum, and he subsequently aligned them with highly credited record producer Mark Williams (Biffy Clyro, Enter Shikari, Million Dead, Oceansize, Yourcodenameis:milo). The band formed an ongoing relationship with Williams, who has since worked on every record the band has released.

=== "We Will Not Forget" (2010) ===
"We Will Not Forget", a standalone single, was recorded at Leeder's Farm in Norfolk in January 2010 and released in May. By this time, drummer Rob Ballingall had already made the decision to leave the band to move to Brooklyn, USA. He officially left the band in April 2010 and was quickly replaced by Adam Wells, who featured in the single's music video and toured with the band until early 2011.

=== "Rock N Roll is Dead and Its Corpse Is For Sale", Fighting Fiction (2011–2012) ===
In 2011 the band relocated from Bath to Brighton and was joined by new drummer Nate Davenport. They hit Envy Studios in Petersfield and recorded their self-titled album over several consecutive weekends in March. Lead single "Rock N Roll is Dead and Its Corpse Is for Sale" was released in May. Throughout the remainder of 2011 the band embarked on two extensive UK tours and opened up the Lock-Up Stage at Reading and Leeds Festivals, playing alongside bands like Descendents, Flogging Molly, Frank Turner, Hot Water Music, OFF! and The Black Pacific. Fighting Fiction was finally released on 12 February 2012 by Xtra Mile Records to relative success, achieving promising reception from numerous radio networks and music magazines. In May 2012, after over a year, Davenport left the band and was replaced in July by new drummer Alex Davis. Davenport later joined Southampton-based punk rock band Miss Vincent.

=== 7" split EP, The Long And The Short Of It (2013) ===
During the recording of the follow-up in the spring of 2013 Roffe left the band and was replaced temporarily by session bass player Jamie Carl Moody, thereby enabling Cooke to concentrate solely on guitar. The Long And The Short Of It was released on 16 September 2013 by Xtra Mile Recordings. A limited-edition 7" vinyl split EP with Dutch band Sweet Empire was released simultaneously and contains two album songs, including the title track. The album was recorded in a number of different locations, including a barn in the middle of West Sussex and the recording studios at Guildford University. In the weeks following the release of the album the band replaced Moody and Davis with bassist Will Bright and drummer Douglas Hunt and undertook a sizable UK, European and American tour spanning 10 countries.

=== Demise (2014) ===
In March 2014, the band announced their decision to disband, posting a heartfelt message of thanks on Facebook.

== Members ==
=== Final line-up ===
- Jacob Glew - Vocals and guitar (2007–2014)
- Andrew Cooke - Guitar, bass and vocals (2007–2013), guitar and vocals (2013–2014)
- Will Bright - Bass (2013–2014)
- Douglas Hunt - Drums (2013–2014)

=== Past members ===
- Robert Ballingall - Drums (2007–2010)
- Adam Wells - Drums (2010–2011)
- Nate Davenport - Drums (2011–2012)
- Alex Davis - Drums (2012–2013)
- Matthew Roffe - Guitar, bass and vocals (2007–2013)
- Jamie Carl Moody - Bass (2013)
