= Frank Turner / Tim Barry Split =

EP by Frank Turner and Tim Barry
- Released: October 13, 2009
- Recorded: Summer 2009
- Label: Suburban Home

Frank Turner chronology
Poetry of the Deed (2009)	Frank Turner / Tim Barry Split (2009)	Buddies (2010)

Tim Barry chronology
Manchester (2008)	Frank Turner / Tim Barry Split (2009)	28th & Stonewall (2010)

"Frank Turner / Tim Barry Split"
- Side B Cover

Frank Turner / Tim Barry is a split 7-inch EP by folk punk musicians Frank Turner and Tim Barry. It was released on October 13, 2009, on Suburban Home Records in the United States on 500 on black vinyl and 1000 on blue. The single was available on pre-order from Vinyl Collective and at the 2009 Revival Tour where both artists were playing. The release features a code that allows the buyer to download a digital copy of the tracks from the Suburban Home Records website.

== Track listing ==
Side A

- Tim Barry - "Thing of the Past" - 3:54

Side B

- Frank Turner - "Try This at Home" (Acoustic) - 1:56

== Tim Barry's personnel ==
=== Musicians ===
- Tim Barry - vocals, acoustic guitar
- Josh Small - electric guitar
- Lance Koehler - drums, tambourine
- Charles Arthur - Lap Steel
- Josh Bearman Bass

=== Recording personnel ===
- Tim Barry
- Lance Koehler - Engineer, Producer

=== Artwork ===
- Chrissy Piper - Photo
- Ryan Patterson - Layout, Auxiliary Design
