= Who Wants to Get Down? =

EP by Joey Cape and Jon Snodgrass
- Released: February 24, 2009
- Genre: Acoustic, alternative rock, folk punk
- Length: 6:30
- Label: Suburban Home

Joey Cape chronology
Bridge (2008)	Who Wants to Get Down? (2009)	Tony Sly / Joey Cape Split 7" (2010)

Jon Snodgrass chronology
Who Wants to Get Down? (2009)	Liverbirds (2010)

Who Wants to Get Down? is an acoustic alternative 7" vinyl EP by punk rock singer Joey Cape of Lagwagon and southern rock singer Jon Snodgrass of Drag the River, released on March 2, 2010, through Suburban Home Records.

Each singer contributed one track to the release, with Cape's song being a new previously unreleased song, and Snodgrass' being a b-side song from his solo album. The EP was pressed on various colors of vinyl - 200 red, 300 white and 500 blue.

== Track listing ==
No.	Title	Length
1.	"I'm Not Gonna Save You"	2:44
2.	"Brave With Strangers"	3:46

== Personnel ==
- Joey Cape - lead vocals on "I'm Not Gonna Save You", acoustic guitar, backing vocals
- Jon Snodgrass - lead vocals on "Brave With Strangers", acoustic guitar, backing vocals
