= Laurel Street Demo 2005 =

Studio album by Tim Barry
- Released: July 4, 2006
- Genre: Folk
- Label: Suburban Home

Tim Barry chronology
Laurel Street Demo 2005 (2006)	Rivanna Junction (2006)

Laurel Street Demo 2005 is the first full-length album by Tim Barry. It was originally recorded only as a demo, but was officially released in the United States on July 4, 2006.

== Track listing ==
1. Idle Idylist - 3:27
2. Sorrow Floats - 2:36
3. Gumshoe Andy - 2:37
4. No News from North - 2:56
5. Ain't Right Sure - 4:16
6. Sagacity Gone - 3:01
7. Church of Level Track - 3:31
8. Carolina's RV - 2:55
