= Oblivion (punk band) =

American punk rock group

- Genres: Punk rock
- Years active: 1988–2000
- Labels: Johanns Face Records (1993 - 1998); Sinister Label (1998); Suburban Home (1999)
- Past members: Pete Kourim (bass / lead vocals); Scott Ozark (guitar / back-up vocals); Brian Czarnik (drums) vocals)

Oblivion (sometimes stylized as ObLiViOn) was a punk rock group from the Chicago area. The band was composed of Pete Kourim on bass guitar and lead vocals, Scott Ozark on guitar and back-up vocals, and Brian Czarnik on drums.

== History ==
The group started as a heavy metal cover band in 1988, but their style solidified to have more of a punk focus by the early 1990s. During the late 90s, Oblivion had a strong following in the Chicago/Midwest punk scene. Their musical stylings borrowed equal parts from punk, metal, and classic rock. They released a number of 7"s and full-length albums primarily on Johann's Face Records, although they also released music on Dr. Strange, Underdog, and others. Songs often commented on social interactions, stories about troubled girls, and relationship issues seen from a cryptic moody perspective. The group sometimes made social commentary but mostly in an indirect and self-debasing way. After more than a decade of playing together, the group disbanded. They played a farewell show in March 2000.

=== Post-breakup ===
- After the group disbanded, Brian moved to Florida and worked on a big cat (tigers/lions) sanctuary. Scott played with the Nobs, while Pete continued to play in Mexican Cheerleader, a band that started while Oblivion still existed.

=== Reunion show ===
Oblivion played a sold out reunion show on December 29, 2006 at the Abbey Pub in Chicago. They shared the bill with Apocalypse Hoboken. This was the first show the band played in over five years and the final show to date.

== Discography ==
- S/T (cassette, 1st Demo) self-release 1989
- Neighborhood (cassette, 2nd Demo) self-release 1990
- Think Tightope Boobjob (cassette, 3rd Demo) self-release 1992 (self distributed at Lollapalooza)
- Product (EP, 7") Johanns Face Records 1993
- Full Blown Grover (ep, 7") Johanns Face Records 1994
- Stop Thief (LP, 12"/CD) Johanns Face Records 1994
- Shoot Me a Waco (LP, 12"/CD) Johanns Face Records 1995
- Suckers From The Start (CD) Sinister Label 1998
- Sweatpants U.S.A. (CD) Suburban Home 1999

=== Splits ===
- split with No Empathy (split, 7") Underdog Records 1995
- split with Humble Beginnings (split, 7") Medio-Core 1997
- split with Apocalypse Hoboken (split, 7") Harmless Records 1997
- split with Gods Reflex (split, 7") Johann's Face Records 1997
- split with Man Dingo (split CD) Dr Strange Records 1999

=== Compilation appearances ===
- A Very Punk Christmas (2x7") Rocco Records/Further Beyond 1993
- Dumpsterland No. 7 (zine + 7") Dumpsterland Zine 1994
- A Taste Of Chicago (CD) Strikeout Wreck-Chords 1995
- Achtung Chicago! Drei (LP 12"/CD) Underdog Records1995
- Punk: It's All About The Orchis Factor (CD) Suburban Home Records 1996
- ABC's Of Punk (LP 12"/CD) Whirled Records 1997
- Marc's A Dick And Gar's A Drunk (LP 12"/CD) Johann's Face Records 1997
- The Check's In The Mail: The Rise And Fall Of The Rocco Empire (CD) Rocco Records 1998
- Girls Kick Ass! (CD) Punk Rock Onion 1999
- Capitol Radio (CD) Torque 1999
- Playing 4 Square, Vol. 1 (CD) Suburban Home Records 2000
- Magnetic Curses (CD) Thick Records 2000

== Related bands ==
- Amish Vomit - Pete Kourim, with Billy Blastoff & Tre', who both would join The Vindictives, where the origins of the song "Stolen" came from.
- The Bollweevils, Life of Pi, Space Age Zeros - Brian Czarnik
- Mexican Cheerleader - Pete Kourim
- The Nobs - Scott Ozark

== Sources ==
- Johanns Face Records (Archived from the Internet Archive)
- Centerstage Chicago
- Knotmag.com Interview circa 2000
- Mexican Cheerleader on MySpace
