= Buddies (EP) =

EP by Frank Turner and Jon Snodgrass
- Released: 24 September 2010 (10" vinyl); January 28, 2011 (iTunes)
- Recorded: August 2010 in Colorado
- Length: 23:36
- Label: Xtra Mile Recordings

Frank Turner chronology
Frank Turner / Tim Barry Split (2009)	Buddies (2010)	Rock & Roll (2010)

Jon Snodgrass chronology
Liverbirds (2010)	Buddies (2010)

Buddies is a 10" split album by British folk punk artist Frank Turner and American alternative country artist Jon Snodgrass, that was written in four hours and was recorded the next day in early August 2010. The 10" vinyl was released in the UK in September 2010 and due to popular demand, it was released as a digital download on iTunes on 28 January 2011.

== Track listing ==
All tracks are written by Frank Turner & Jon Snodgrass.

Cat Number XMR035LP
No.	Title	Length
1.	"Buddies"	3:26
2.	"Styx: The Man, the Band"	0:35
3.	"The Ballad of Steve"	1:54
4.	"Susannah"	2:44
5.	"Old Fast Songs"	2:13
6.	"Shut the Chicken"	1:45
7.	"New Orleansy"	3:39
8.	"Big Rock in Little Rock"	2:53
9.	"Mo'squitoz"	2:41
10.	"Remember That Time We Wrote This Record?"	2:02
Total length:		23:36
