= Covering Ground =

Studio album by Chuck Ragan
- Released: September 13, 2011
- Genres: Folk rock, indie folk
- Length: 45:16
- Label: SideOneDummy
- Producer: Christopher Thorn

Chuck Ragan chronology
Gold Country (2009)	Covering Ground (2011)	Till Midnight (2014)

Professional ratings
Aggregate scores
Source	Rating
Metacritic	78/100
Review scores
Source	Rating
Alternative Press	4/5 stars
The A.V. Club	B-
Kerrang!	4/5 stars
Paste Magazine	7.4/10
Rock Sound	8/10
Sputnikmusic	4/5 stars

Covering Ground is the third studio album by American musician Chuck Ragan, which was recorded in 2011 and produced by Christopher Thorn. The album was recorded during Hot Water Music's hiatus and features a strong folk influence with themes surrounding the life on the road away from loved ones. Brian Fallon of The Gaslight Anthem and Frank Turner are both featured as guest vocalists on selected tracks.

== Track listing ==
No.	Title	Length
1.	"Nothing Left to Prove"	3:27
2.	"Nomad by Fate"	3:13
3.	"You Get What You Give"	3:37
4.	"Wish on the Moon"	3:32
5.	"Come Around"	4:30
6.	"Seems We're OK"	3:53
7.	"Valentine"	3:31
8.	"Right as Rain"	4:07
9.	"Meet You in the Middle"	3:24
10.	"Lost and Found"	12:02

"Lost and Found" concludes at 4:09; a hidden track called "Camaraderie of the Commons" starts at 9:04.
