= The Liver Birds (disambiguation) =

The Liver Birds is a BBC television sitcom.

The Liver Birds or similar terms can also refer to:

- Liver bird, symbolic bird of Liverpool
- The Liverbirds, English girl band
- Liverbirds (album), a 2010 album by Joey Cape and Jon Snodgrass
