= Fuel for the Hate Game =

Studio album by Hot Water Music
- Released: February 28, 1997
- Recorded: Recorded at Morrisound and Nordic Helmet Studios. Spring of '96.
- Genres: Post-hardcore, emo, punk rock
- Length: 41:02
- Label: Toybox/No Idea
- Producer: Hot Water Music

Hot Water Music chronology
Finding the Rhythms (1995)	Fuel for the Hate Game (1997)	Forever and Counting (1997)

Professional ratings
Review scores
Source	Rating
AllMusic	4.5/5 stars
Punknews.org	5/5 stars

Fuel for the Hate Game is the first full-length album by Hot Water Music. Fuel... was released by Toybox Records and No Idea Records in 1997, later repressings only listed No Idea. The album features artwork by Scott Sinclair (not to be confused with Scott Sinclair) and was designed by Sean Bonner.

The track "Freightliner" was featured on the soundtrack to the skateboarding video game Tony Hawk's Pro Skater 4. Paste included the song on a list of "20 Best Drinking Songs".

== Reception ==
Allmusic reviewed the album as "raw and unrelenting, but it is also a refreshing release of energy, and an infectious one at that. This is the record that saw the band rise to the top of the hardcore/punk scene, and, years after its release, it is still as deserving of credit as it ever was." The A.V. Club stated the album (and their next album released later that year) "stand as two of ’90s’ punk’s proudest monuments—records that cut through all the squabbling, all the second-guessing, and all the politics of the punk scene and straight into its aching heart.

== Track listing ==
No.	Title	Length
1.	"220 Years"	4:47
2.	"Turnstile"	3:28
3.	"Blackjaw"	3:13
4.	"Trademark"	3:16
5.	"Freightliner"	3:18
6.	"The Sleeping Fan"	4:29
7.	"Facing and Backing"	4:02
8.	"Rock Singer"	3:53
9.	"North and About"	3:26
10.	"Difference Engine"	3:19
11.	"Drunken Third"	3:59

Expanded Edition bonus tracks
No.	Title	Length
12.	"You Can Take the Boy Out of Bradenton"	2:59
13.	"Hate Mail Comes in August"	3:59
14.	"Elektra"	3:25
15.	"Things on a Dashboard"	5:09
16.	"Difference Engine" (demo)	3:32
17.	"The Sleeping Fan" (demo)	4:44

== Personnel ==
- Chuck Ragan - guitar/vocals
- Chris Wollard - guitar/vocals
- Jason Black - bass guitar
- George Rebelo - drums
