= Jon Snodgrass (musician) =

American singer-songwriter (born 1972)

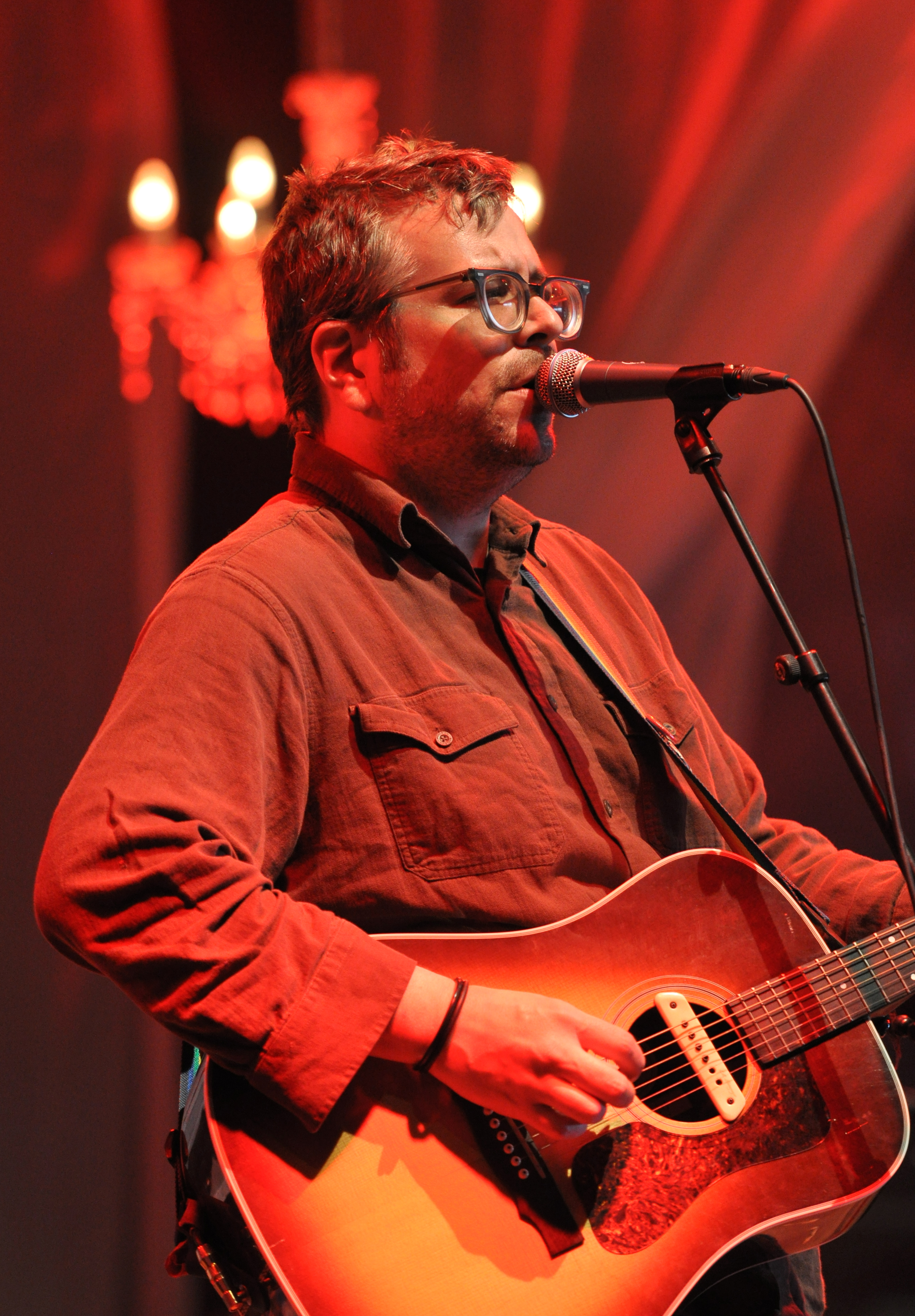
- Jon Snodgrass in 2013

Background information
- Born: Jon Snodgrass
- Genres: Punk rock, alternative rock, indie rock, folk punk
- Occupations: Singer-songwriter, musician
- Instruments: Vocals, guitar
- Years active: 1991–present
- Labels: Suburban Home, Cargo/Headhunter, My Records, Paper + Plastick, Hometown Caravan, A-F Records, Xtra Mile Records, Stay Free Recordings
- Website: jonsnodgrass.com

Jon Snodgrass (born October 27, 1972) is a musician and member of the groups Armchair Martian, Scorpios, and Drag the River. He also performs solo and has collaborated with other musicians, including Tim McIlrath of Rise Against, and Joey Cape of Lagwagon.

== Biography ==
Jon Snodgrass was born and raised in St. Joseph, Missouri, and later settled in Fort Collins, Colorado, before forming Armchair Martian in the early 1990s. In 1996, he started recording songs with ALL singer Chad Price under the name Drag the River. Since then, he has continued putting out music with both bands, as a solo artist, and as a member of Scorpios.

Snodgrass has collaborated with Chad Rex, Hagfish, Descendents, Stephen Egerton, Joey Cape, Lagwagon, Bad Astronaut, Cory Branan, Frank Turner, Chuck Ragan (Revival Tour and Hot Water Music), Tim McIlirath (Rise Against), Chris Wollard (Hot Water Music and Ship Thieves), Vinnie Fiorello (Less Than Jake), Scott Reynolds (ALL), Mike Herrera (MxPx), Arliss Nancy, and Jimmy Islip.

== Discography ==
With Armchair Martian:

- barely passing 7in 1994
- Xenophobe single (Cargo/Headhunter) 1995
- s/t (Cargo/Headhunter) 1996
- Monsters Always Scream (My Records) 1997
- Hang On, Ted (Cargo/Headhunter) 1998
- War of the Worlds Split with Bad Astronaut (O&O Records) 2001
- Who Wants To Play Bass? (My Records) 2002
- Good Guys, Bad Band (Suburban Home Records) 2007

With Drag the River:

- Hobos Demos (Upland/O&O Records) 2000
- CLOSED (Upland/O&O Records) 2002
- Live at the Starlight (Mars Motors) 2002
- At the Green Door LP (Mars Motors) 2003
- Chicken Demos (Upland/O&O Records) 2004
- hey, buddies (Mars Motors) 2004
- a way with women 7in (wallride) 2004
- a shame/beautiful & damned 7in (third world) 2006
- It's Crazy (Suburban Home Records) 2006
- Gabba Gabba Hey, Buddies 12in (Derok) 2007
- Found All the Parts Split w/ the Dents (Suburban Home Records) 2007
- You Can't Live This Way (Suburban Home Records) 2008
- Under the Influence Sam Cooke/Jeff Black 7in (Suburban Home Records) 2009
- Can't Leave These Strays 7in (Suburban Home Records) 2009
- Garage Rock 7in (Suburban Home Records) 2009
- Bad at Breaking Up 7in/outta print collection (Suburban Home Records) 2009
- Split 7in w/ Ship Thieves (Hometown Caravan) 2009
- 2010 Demons LP (Hometown Caravan) 2010
- Drag the River (Xtra Mile Recordings) 2013

Solo, with others:

- Live at the Hi-Dive 6.12.07 Cassette (Analog Empire) 2008
- Who Wants to Get Down? split 7in w/ Joey Cape (Suburban Home Records) 2009
- Visitor's Band (Suburban Home) 2009
- Wolf & Cobra LP & Cassette w/ Cory Branan (Suburban Home) 2009
- Buddies 10in w/ Frank Turner (Xtra Mile) 2010
- Liverbirds w/ Joey Cape (crank lab) 2010
- Tri-State Record 7in (Paper + Plastick) 2011
- Five State Record (Hometown Caravan) 2011
- More Buddies, More Fun (Paper + Plastick) 2012
- 1-2-3-4/Perfect Match (Hometown Caravan) 2016
- TACE (A-F Records) Oct. 2020
- Buddies II: Still Buddies w/ Frank Turner (Xtra Mile) 2020
- Barge at Will March 2024
- Stoked Ghost November 2024

With Scorpios:

- s/t LP (self-released) 2011 (re-released 2013 Destiny Records, Berlin) / Fat Records
- Scorpios Too (One Week Records / Fat Wreck Chords) 2017
