= Till Midnight =

Till Midnight may refer to:

- Till Midnight (song), 1984 song by Evelyn "Champagne" King from So Romantic
- Till Midnight (album), 2014
