= A Flight and a Crash =

Studio album by Hot Water Music
- Released: June 5, 2001
- Recorded: December 2000 & January 2001
- Studios: Salad Days, Beltsville, Maryland
- Genres: Punk rock, post-hardcore
- Length: 39:17
- Label: Epitaph
- Producer: Brian McTernan

Hot Water Music chronology
No Division (1999)	A Flight and a Crash (2001)	Alkaline Trio/ Hot Water Music (2002)

A Flight and a Crash is the fourth studio album by American punk rock band Hot Water Music, released on June 5, 2001, by Epitaph Records. It is Hot Water Music's first release on Epitaph. The album peaked at No. 49 on Billboard's Top Independent Album chart.

== Reception ==
Professional ratings
Review scores
Source	Rating
AllMusic	3/5 stars
NME	4/5 stars

CMJ New Music Monthly's Raspberry Jones described the album as "a full-frontal assault that resembles the early Clash for fierceness". Writing for Lollipop Magazine, Tim Dem praised the record, stating that "A Flight and a Crash continues No Division's Leatherface-sing-a-longs, but with more coherent melodies and song development."

== Track listing ==
No.	Title	Lead vocals	Length
1.	"A Flight and a Crash"	Wollard	2:08
2.	"Jack of All Trades"	Ragan	2:44
3.	"Paper Thin"	Wollard	2:25
4.	"Instrumental"	Ragan and Wollard	1:38
5.	"Swinger"	Wollard	2:41
6.	"A Clear Line"	Ragan and Wollard	3:15
7.	"Choked and Separated"	Wollard	3:29
8.	"Old Rules"	Ragan	2:50
9.	"Sons and Daughters"	Ragan	3:27
10.	"Sunday Suit"	Ragan	3:00
11.	"She Takes It So Well"	Wollard	2:48
12.	"One More Time"	Wollard	2:12
13.	"In the Gray"	Wollard	3:48
14.	"Call It Trashing"	Ragan and Wollard	2:51
15.	"So Many Days" (LP only, also appears on Till the Wheels Fall Off compilation)	Wollard	3:39
