= No Division =

Studio album by Hot Water Music
- Released: August 10, 1999
- Recorded: Mirror Image Studios, Gainesville, Florida
- Genres: Punk rock; emocore; post-hardcore; hardcore punk
- Length: 34:50
- Label: Some
- Producer: Walter Schreifels

Hot Water Music chronology
Live at the Hardback (1999)	No Division (1999)	A Flight and a Crash (2001)

Professional ratings
Review scores
Source	Rating
Allmusic	2.5/5 stars
Punknews.org	4.5/5 stars
Ox-Fanzine	positive
NME	4/5 stars
Chicago Tribune	positive

No Division is the third full-length album by American post-hardcore band Hot Water Music. It was released by Some Records on August 10, 1999.

== Recording ==
Hot Water Music's Jason Black stated of the recording: "[on the last album] we just didn't know what the hell we were doing. So this time around it was nice, we went to a studio and spent maybe two, two and a half weeks and really recorded an album, front to back. The album was produced by Walter Schreifels of Gorilla Biscuits fame. The band recorded the album after a hiatus, vocalist Chuck Ragan stated "I know we were all a hell of a lot more focused going into [it], You can really tell just by listening to it.”

The album was originally scheduled for release on June 1, 1999, but was pushed back to August 10, 1999.

== Composition ==
Regarding its musical style, No Division has been labeled as a punk rock album, and under punk subgenres such as emocore, post-hardcore, and hardcore punk. The album includes elements of hard rock, pop-punk, and Southern gospel in the overall sound.

== Reception ==
Allmusic stated the album "isn't as strong as the records that preceded it, but, at the end of the day, anything this band has to offer is still a lot more honest and explosive than what most of their peers have." Punknews.org called the album "awesome" stating the band has " their formula of 'emotionally-charged hardcore' down to a tee". Alternative Press praised two songs as "jaw-dropping technical" and praised the sincerity of the album's lyrics. PopMatters called the album "a magnificent testament to what a punk rock band could do if they kept both ears on expanding their sound, but both feet planted in their roots... For one album, Hot Water Music managed to pull off the rare feat of maintaining the energy and politics of punk while embracing a thoroughly rock and roll sound." Ox-Fanzine described the album as a "grandiose, varied and absolutely standalone work".

== Legacy ==
The song "Rooftops" was covered by Alkaline Trio on the Alkaline Trio / Hot Water Music split EP in 2002. In 2019, Alternative Press included the album on the list of 12 essential punk and emo albums of 1999, describing it as "a gut-wrenching roller coaster of love, hate and grief, all captured in an aggressive 30 minutes." DecoyMusic.com described No Division as "one of blueprints for modern punk rock" and the band's best work.

In 2019, the band played the album in full on tour, based on a Twitter poll conducted amongst fans. Also in 2019, brewing company Arizona Wilderness created an IPA named after the album in collaboration with the band.

== Track listing ==
No.	Title	Lead vocals	Length
1.	"SouthEast First"	Ragan	3:05
2.	"Free Radio Gainesville"	Wollard & Ragan	2:30
3.	"Our Own Way"	Wollard	2:36
4.	"It's Hard to Know"	Ragan	3:29
5.	"At the End of a Gun"	Wollard	3:56
6.	"No Division"	Wollard	2:05
7.	"Jet Set Ready"	Wollard & Ragan	3:37
8.	"Rooftops"	Ragan	2:53
9.	"Hit and Miss"	Wollard & Ragan	3:57
10.	"Driving Home"	Wollard & Ragan	3:24
11.	"In Song"	Ragan	3:23

== Personnel ==
- Chuck Ragan - guitar, vocals
- Chris Wollard - guitar, vocals
- Jason Black - bass guitar
- George Rebelo - drums
- Walter Schreifels - producer, backing vocals on "Free Radio Gainesville"
- Tim Barry of Avail - guest vocals on "Hit and Miss"
- Rob Huddleston of Ann Beretta - guest vocals on "Its Hard to Know"
