= Boddicker =

Boddicker is a surname. Notable people with the surname include:

- Michael Boddicker (born 1953), American film composer and electronic musician.
- Mike Boddicker (born 1957), Major League Baseball pitcher.
- Zach Boddicker, American guitarist

== See also ==
- Clarence Boddicker, fictional character from RoboCop
- Zombie Apocalypse (band), also known as Boddicker
