= Forever and Counting =

Studio album by Hot Water Music
- Released: October 28, 1997
- Genre: Punk rock; post-hardcore; emo
- Length: 37:54
- Label: Doghouse Records, Rise Records
- Producer: Hot Water Music

Hot Water Music chronology
Fuel for the Hate Game (1997)	Forever and Counting (1997)	No Division (1999)

Professional ratings
Review scores
Source	Rating
Allmusic	3/5 stars

Forever and Counting is the second full-length album by Hot Water Music. It was released by Doghouse Records in 1997, reissued in 2008 by No Idea Records, and later purchased and re-released in 2012 by Rise Records.

For 'Forever And Counting', the band had to have a short lived name change to 'The Hot Water Music Band'. This was due to a rival label, Elektra Records claiming they owned the rights to the name Hot Water Music, due to another band with the same name on the label. The Elektra band broke up after the release of the album and Hot Water Music continued to produce records under their original name.

In a 2015 interview, bassist Jason Black criticized the sound of the album, stating "I think there’s some cool songs on it, that’s definitely one record we’ve thought about re-recording a lot but we haven’t because people like it so much. It just sounds terrible." La Dispute frontman Jordan Dryer cited the album as highly influential on his career. The A.V. Club stated the album (and their previous album released earlier that year) "stand as two of ’90s’ punk’s proudest monuments—records that cut through all the squabbling, all the second-guessing, and all the politics of the punk scene and straight into its aching heart.

== Track listing ==
No.	Title	Length
1.	"Translocation"	3:21
2.	"Better Sense"	3:12
3.	"Just Don't Say You Lost It"	3:10
4.	"Position"	3:56
5.	"Rest Assured"	4:07
6.	"Manual"	5:08
7.	"Minno"	3:53
8.	"Three Summers Strong"	4:13
9.	"Man the Change"	2:33
10.	"Western Grace"	4:17
