= Till the Wheels Fall Off (disambiguation) =

Till the Wheels Fall Off is an album by Hot Water Music.

Till the Wheels Fall Off may refer to:

- Till the Wheels Fall Off, an album by Frost
- "Till the Wheels Fall Off", a song by Chris Brown featuring Lil Durk and Capella Grey from the 2022 album Breezy
- "Till the Wheels Fall Off", a song by Static Major
