= Rivanna Junction =

Studio album by Tim Barry
- Released: November 21, 2006
- Recorded: July 2006
- Genre: Folk
- Length: 36:21
- Label: Suburban Home
- Producer: Lance Koehler

Tim Barry chronology
Laurel Street Demo 2005 (2005)	Rivanna Junction (2006)	Manchester (2008)

Professional ratings
Review scores
Source	Rating
Allmusic	4/5 stars

Rivanna Junction is the second full-length album by Tim Barry. It was released in the United States on November 21, 2006.

== Track listing ==
1. "Trash Inspirations" - 3:04
2. "Avoiding Catatonic Surrender" - 3:36
3. "Dog Bumped" - 4:17
4. "Church of Level Track" - 3:28
5. "Exit Wounds" - 4:22
6. "Cardinal In Red Bed" - 3:26
7. "Shoulda Oughta" - 2:16
8. "Steel Road" - 4:02
9. "C'mon Quinn" - 2:57
10. "Wait At Milano" - 4:49
