= Liverbirds (album) =

Studio album by Joey Cape and Jon Snodgrass
- Released: April 1, 2010
- Genre: Acoustic, alternative rock, folk punk, alternative country
- Length: 27:28
- Label: Self-released
- Producer: Joey Cape, Jon Snodgrass

Joey Cape chronology
Tony Sly / Joey Cape Split 7" (2010)	Liverbirds (2010)	Doesn't Play Well with Others (2010)

Jon Snodgrass chronology
Who Wants to Get Down? (2009)	Liverbirds (2010)	Buddies (2010)

Liverbirds is an acoustic alternative album by punk rock singer Joey Cape of Lagwagon and southern rock singer Jon Snodgrass of Drag the River, self-released on April 1, 2010.

== Production ==
The album featured songs from Cape's bands Lagwagon and Bad Astronaut and from Snodgrass' bands Drag the River and Armchair Martian in new acoustic alternative country-flavored renditions. Each member contributed five songs, with one of Snodgrass's songs - "Spiderman, Wolfman" – being a previously unreleased new song.

== Release ==
The album was originally available for purchase at Cape and Snodgrass's acoustic shows during their European tour with Tony Sly in February 2010, but it was made available for online purchase on their webstore on April 1, 2010.

== Track listing ==
No.	Title	Length
1.	"To All My Friends"	2:53
2.	"Whipping Boy"	2:38
3.	"Making Friends"	2:25
4.	"Angry Days"	3:56
5.	"Alien 8"	2:12
6.	"Break Your Frame"	3:38
7.	"Jessica's Suicide"	2:20
8.	"Losing Everyone"	2:33
9.	"Spiderman, Wolfman" (previously unreleased)	2:14
10.	"Mexican Song"	2:39

== Personnel ==
- Joey Cape - lead vocals (tracks 1–5), acoustic guitar, backing vocals
- Jon Snodgrass - lead vocals (tracks 6–10), acoustic guitar, backing vocals
