= Abigail Austin =

American musician

- Born: Austin Lucas; Bloomington, Indiana, United States
- Genres: Punk rock; folk punk; folk; alternative rock; bluegrass; country
- Occupation: Musician
- Instruments: Vocals; guitar
- Years active: 1997–present
- Label: New West
- Website: austinlucasmusic.com

Abigail Austin (born Austin Lucas) is an American indie artist known for her own blend of folk punk.

== Early years ==
Austin grew up in Bloomington, Indiana, but moved to the Czech Republic in 2003. In 2008, she relocated back to the United States. She is the child of Bob Lucas, who is a producer/songwriter known for his work with Alison Krauss. Austin spent six years as a member of the Indiana University Children's Choir.

== Career ==
Austin was bassist and backing vocalist in the band Twenty Third Chapter from 1997 to 1999 and lead vocalist in Rune from 1998 to 2000. She was also involved with the band K10 Prospect as lead singer/guitarist from 2000 to 2004. She then played lead guitar in the Prague-based band Guided Cradle, starting in 2004. She has also worked with fellow indie artist Chuck Ragan. The two first collaborated in 2007 when they released a split album, and later on the Bristle Ridge record in 2008. Austin took part in the Revival Tour alongside Ragan, Ben Nichols of Lucero, and Tim Barry. The following year, she rejoined the Revival Tour alongside her father, Ragan, Barry, Frank Turner, Jim Ward, and other artists.

In 2013, Austin was signed to New West Records and released a new studio album, Stay Reckless.

On August 17, 2018, she released the album Immortal Americans on Cornelius Chapel Records.

Austin, who is anti-fascist, Jewish, and openly pansexual, has spoken about how the American country music genre is "a very cis, hetero club overall", and how she used to worry that her identity and politics might negatively affect her career.

== Personal life ==
Abigail came out as transgender in 2024.

== Discography ==
- The Common Cold (2006)
- Split 7" with Chuck Ragan (2007)
- Putting the Hammer Down (2007)
- Bristle Ridge with Chuck Ragan (2008)
- At War with Freak Folk (2008)
- Somebody Loves You (2009)
- Two Songs EP (2010)
- Collection (2010)
- A New Home in the Old World (2011)
- Stay Reckless (2013)
- Between the Moon & the Midwest (2016)
- Immortal Americans (2018)
- No One Is Immortal (2019)
- Alive in the Hot Zone (2020)
- Reinventing Against Me! (2023)
