= In a Million Pieces =

Studio album by The Draft
- Released: September 12, 2006
- Genres: Punk rock, Alternative rock, Emo
- Label: Epitaph Records

The Draft chronology
In a Million Pieces (2006)	The Draft (2007)

Professional ratings
Review scores
Source	Rating
AllMusic	4/5 stars
Punknews.org	4.5/5 stars

In a Million Pieces is the only album by The Draft. It was released in 2006 on Epitaph Records, and was the first new music released by members of Hot Water Music following that band's hiatus earlier that year.

== Track listing ==
1. "New Eyes Open" - 3:38
2. "Lo Zee Rose" - 3:13
3. "Let It Go" - 2:57
4. "Alive or Dead" - 2:45
5. "Bordering" - 3:19
6. "Impossible" - 3:37
7. "Wired" - 2:39
8. "Not What I Wanna Do" - 3:06
9. "All We Can Count On" - 2:40
10. "Out of Tune" - 2:56
11. "Longshot" - 2:53
12. "The Tide is Out" - 3:09
