= The Draft (band) =

American punk rock band

- Origin: Gainesville, Florida, U.S.
- Genre: Punk rock
- Years active: 2006 – 2007, 2013
- Label: Epitaph Records
- Spinoff of: Hot Water Music
- Members: Chris Wollard; Jason Black; George Rebelo; Todd Rockhill

The Draft are a band featuring Hot Water Music members Jason Black, George Rebelo and Chris Wollard. The band also features guitarist Todd Rockhill of Black Cougar Shock Unit, Discount and a host of other Gainesville, Florida based acts.

The Draft formed soon after the departure of singer/guitarist Chuck Ragan from Hot Water Music. The three remaining members of the band wanted to continue making music together, but decided not to continue under the Hot Water Music name, choosing instead to start fresh.

In 2006, The Draft began touring. Their debut album, In a Million Pieces, was released on September 12, 2006.

On March 13, 2007, The Draft released a self-titled digital EP through all major music download services.

In mid-October 2007, The Draft released the We'll Never Know/Hard to Be Around It 7" on No Idea Records. The two songs are also available through iTunes.

The Draft reunited for a tour in summer 2013.

== Discography ==
=== Full Length Albums ===
- In a Million Pieces - 2006, Epitaph Records

=== EPs ===
- The Draft - 2007, Epitaph Records, Digital EP
- We'll Never Know/Hard to Be Around It - 2007, No Idea Records, 7" Vinyl and Digital EP
