= Miss Vincent =

English punk rock band

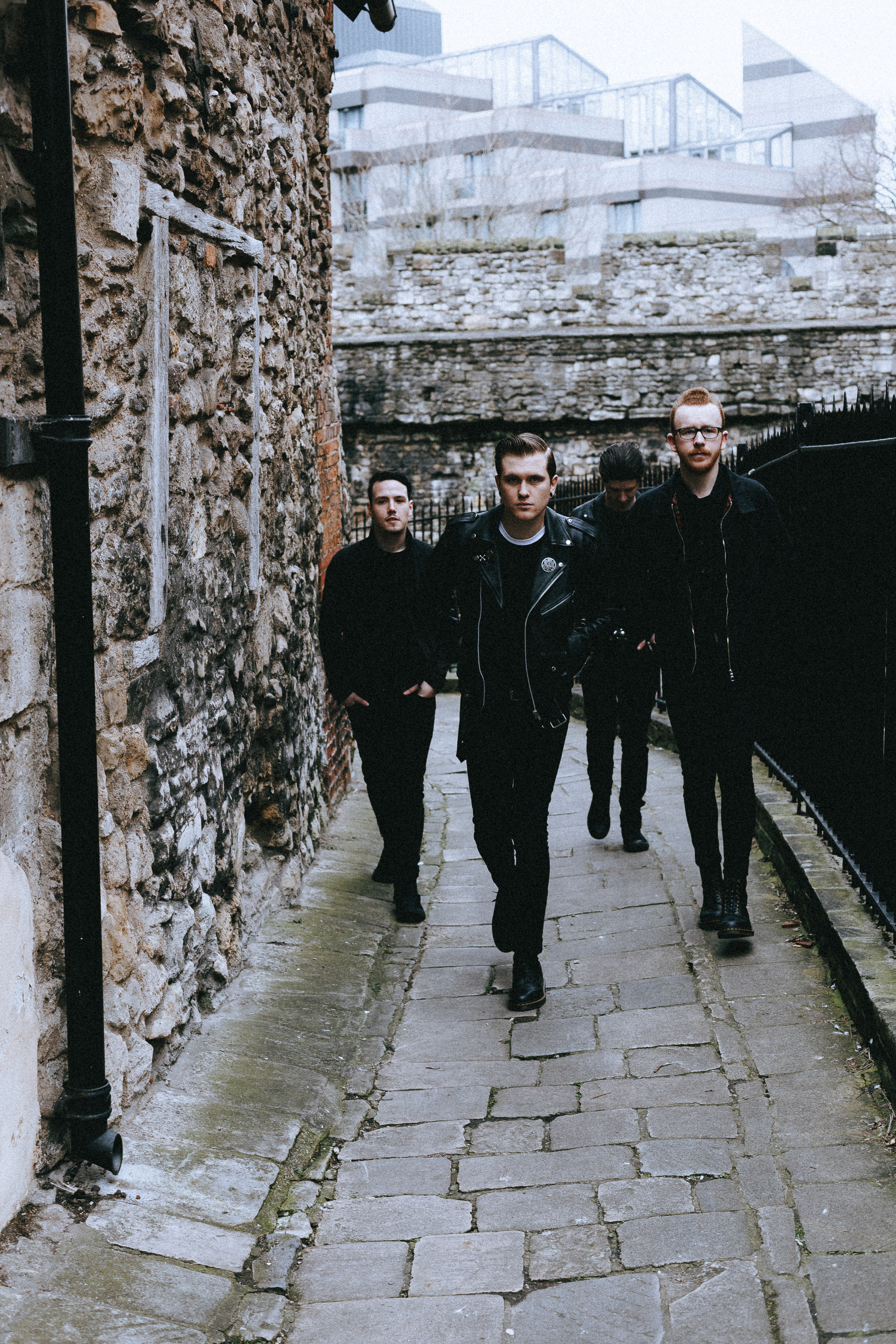

Background information
- Origin: Southampton, Hampshire, England
- Genres: Horror punk; punk rock
- Years active: 2012–present
- Labels: Silent Cult, Uncle M, Engineer
- Members: Alex Marshall; Lawrie Pattison; Owain Mainwaring; Nate Davenport
- Past members: Jack Donnelly

Miss Vincent is an English punk rock band formed in Southampton, Hampshire, England in 2012. The band currently features original frontman Alex Marshall and lead guitarist Lawrie Pattison, as well as bass player Owain Mainwaring and drummer Nate Davenport. All four members contribute to their two- and three-part harmony vocals, a trademark of the band's sound. In August 2020, the band signed to Silent Cult Records, having previously been signed to Uncle M Records and Engineer Records, and in May 2021 announced their debut full-length album, A Funeral for Youth, which was released that September.

The original three-piece lineup formed in 2012 and featured Marshall on bass guitar and original drummer Jack Donnelly. In 2013 the band recruited Mainwaring, allowing Marshall to move to rhythm guitar, and replaced Donnelly in 2017 with Davenport.

== Musical style and influence ==
Miss Vincent have cited musical influences including Alkaline Trio, Bad Religion, The Misfits, Bayside, Social Distortion, AFI, The Ramones, Against Me!, Our Time Down Here, The Gaslight Anthem, Masked Intruder, Buddy Holly, and Danny & the Juniors, leading to them being described as punk rock, gothic punk and gloomy punk, with traditional rock 'n' roll elements and "vintage vibes".

== Band name ==
After hearing the mention of a "Miss Vincent" in Alkaline Trio's "Queen of Pain", frontman Marshall was inspired to look into the character, inadvertently discovering the story of Joyce Carol Vincent which inspired him instead to write a song about her life. The song was initially titled "Miss Vincent" but the band eventually decided to change the song's title to "No One Knew" and used the song's original title to name the band instead. "No One Knew" was the band's first single and it was released on 5 October 2012. The song was subsequently rerecorded and released in 2021 as part of the band's debut album, A Funeral For Youth.

== Members ==
=== Current line-up ===
- Alex Marshall – lead vocals (2012–present), rhythm guitar (2013–present), bass (2012)
- Lawrie Pattison – lead guitar, backing vocals (2012–present)
- Owain Mainwaring – bass, backing vocals (2013–present)
- Nate Davenport – drums, backing vocals (2017–present)

=== Past members ===
- Jack Donnelly – drums (2012–2017)

== Discography ==
=== Albums ===
- A Funeral for Youth (2021)

=== EPs ===
- Creepy (2013)
- Reasons Not to Sleep (2015)
- Somewhere Else (2017)

=== Singles ===
- "No One Knew" (2012)
- "Planning to Fail" (2013)
- "How Much Further?" (2015)
- "You Can't Spell Blame Without Me" (2015)
- "Disparate, Desperate" (2015)
- "Lonely This Christmas", originally recorded by Mud (2015)
- "The Lovers" (2017)
- "Cold Hands" (2017)
- "Melanie" (2018)
- "My Iron Heart" (2019)
- "Doctors and Churches" (2019)
- "Blue in the Face", originally recorded by Alkaline Trio (2020)
- "Vials" (2020)
- "Gravity" (2021)
- "Heresy" (2021)
- "Rosaline" (2021)
- "A Funeral for Youth" (2021)
- "In the Still of the Night", originally recorded by the Five Satins (2022)
- "Diana", originally recorded by Paul Anka (2023)
