= Caution (Hot Water Music album) =

Studio album by Hot Water Music
- Released: October 8, 2002
- Genre: Punk rock, post-hardcore
- Length: 36:22
- Label: Epitaph
- Producer: Brian McTernan

Hot Water Music chronology
Alkaline Trio/Hot Water Music (2002)	Caution (2002)	The New What Next (2004)

Professional ratings
Review scores
Source	Rating
AbsolutePunk	(90%)
AllMusic	4/5 stars

Caution is the fifth studio album by Hot Water Music, released by Epitaph Records on October 8, 2002.

The track "Remedy" was featured in the soundtrack for Tony Hawk's Underground.

== Track listing ==
No.	Title	Lead vocals	Length
1.	"Remedy"	Chuck Ragan	2:38
2.	"Trusty Chords"	Chris Wollard	2:49
3.	"I Was on a Mountain"	Wollard	3:39
4.	"One Step to Slip"	Ragan	3:20
5.	"It's All Related"	Wollard	3:24
6.	"The Sense"	Ragan	2:37
7.	"Not for Anyone"	Wollard	2:44
8.	"Sweet Disasters"	Ragan	2:41
9.	"Alright for Now"	Wollard	3:53
10.	"We'll Say Anything We Want"	Wollard	2:51
11.	"Wayfarer"	Ragan	2:57
12.	"The End"	Wollard	2:49

== Personnel ==
- Chris Wollard
- Chuck Ragan
- George Rebelo
- Jason Black

additional guitar courtesy of Brian Baker
