= Toybox Records =

Record label

Toybox Records was a record label from Gainesville, Florida, and Chicago, Illinois, that existed from 1992 to 1999. It was started by Sean Bonner when he lived in Bradenton, Florida, shortly before moving to Gainesville. The label closed when he lived in Chicago.

== Bands ==
- Alpha Jerk
- Andromeda
- Ascension
- Crud is a Cult
- Culture
- Dragbody
- Grade
- Hot Water Music
- Integrity
- Less Than Jake
- Spoke

== Catalog ==
Cat. Num.	Band	Release	Date	Format
TBX 001	Various Artists	It's a Florida Thing, You Wouldn't Understand Featuring: Bloodlet, Spring, Timescape Zero, Lazy Suzan, Failure Face, and Sweet Pickles	1992	7"
TBX 002	Less Than Jake / Spoke / Bombshell	3-Way Split	1993	7"
TBX 003	Vanbuilderass / When Puberty Strikes!	Split	1994	7"
TBX 004	Less Than Jake	Pez Kings	1995	7"
TBX 005	Various Artists	Attaining the Supreme Featuring: Man Or Astro-Man?, Whirlybird, M Blanket, Swank, Teeth, Squatweiler, Shade, Quadiliacha, Hot Water Music, Waffle Stomper, Maximillian Colby, Tanner Boyle, Second Hand, Horace Pinker, Water Monitor, Less Than Jake, The Pee Tanks, Car Vs. Driver, The Odd Numbers, and Bug Hummer	1995	CD
TBX 006	Hot Water Music	Eating the Filler	1995	7"
TBX 007	Andromeda	Andromeda	1997	7"
TBX 008	Grade	...And Such Is Progress	1995	LP
TBX 009	Dragbody	Dragbody	1996	7"
TBX 010	Alpha Jerk	Alpha Jerk	1996	CD
TBX 011	Culture	Reborn of You	—	10"
TBX 012	Integrity	...And for Those Who Still Fear Tomorrow.	1996	LP
TBX 013	Culture / Kindred	Split	—	LP
TBX 014	Hot Water Music	Finding the rhythms	1997	CD
TBX 015	Hot Water Music	Fuel for the Hate Game	1997	CD/LP
TBX 016	Ascension	The Years of Fire	1996	CD/10"
TBX 017			—	
TBX 018			—	
TBX 019	Ascension	Abomination	1999	CD/LP
