= The New What Next =

Studio album by Hot Water Music
- Released: September 21, 2004
- Genre: Punk rock
- Length: 41:14
- Label: Epitaph
- Producer: Brian McTernan

Hot Water Music chronology
Caution (2002)	The New What Next (2004)	Till the Wheels Fall Off (2008)

Professional ratings
Review scores
Source	Rating
AllMusic	3.5/5 stars
PopMatters	6/10
Punknews.org	4/5 stars

The New What Next is the sixth full-length studio album by Hot Water Music. It was released by Epitaph in 2004. This was Hot Water Music's final release before temporarily disbanding in 2006, and their last new release until 2012's Exister.

== Track listing ==
No.	Title	Length
1.	"Poison"	2:51
2.	"The End of the Line"	3:12
3.	"All Heads Down"	3:20
4.	"My Little Monkey Wrench"	3:12
5.	"Under Everything"	4:15
6.	"There Are Already Roses"	3:14
7.	"Keep It Together"	3:30
8.	"The Ebb and Flow"	3:45
9.	"Bottomless Seas"	3:08
10.	"Ink and Lead"	4:05
11.	"This Early Grave"	3:37
12.	"Giver"	3:05
13.	"Kill the Night" (LP only, also appears on Till the Wheels Fall Off compilation)	2:42

== Personnel ==
- Chuck Ragan – guitar, vocals
- Chris Wollard – guitar, vocals
- Jason Black – bass guitar
- George Rebelo – drums
