= Rumbleseat =

American acoustic folk trio

- Origin: Gainesville, Florida, U.S.
- Genres: Acoustic; Folk
- Years active: 1998–1999
- Label: No Idea Records
- Spinoff of: Hot Water Music
- Past members: Chuck Ragan; Chris Wollard; Samantha Jones

Rumbleseat was the acoustic-folk side project of Hot Water Music frontmen Chuck Ragan and Chris Wollard, and Samantha Jones. Formed in 1998, Rumbleseat released four 7" records before releasing the full-length album Rumbleseat is Dead in 2005.

== Rumbleseat is Dead ==
Rumbleseat's only full-length album, Rumbleseat is Dead, is a collection of songs from their four seven-inch singles, "California Burritos", "Picker", "Saturn in Crosshairs", and "Trestles", as well as two songs from compilations, and four previously unreleased songs. The album was not released until July 12, 2005, as the band was faced with delay after delay. One of these delays was a result of the Hurricane Gaston flood of Richmond, Virginia, where numerous recordings were damaged. When the album was finally released, it received criticism from fans for not including the popular song "Walk Through the Darkness". The album also features covers of Johnny Cash and June Carter's "Jackson", Don Gibson's "Sea of Heartbreak", and Tex Ritter's "Rye Whiskey".

=== Track listing ===
1. California Burritos (2:23)
2. Cursing Concrete (3:03)
3. Trestles (3:19)
4. Picker (3:01)
5. Jackson (2:38)
6. Restless (5:22)
7. Shithouse Rat (2:15)
8. Moonshiner (4:35)
9. Saturn in Crosshairs (4:23)
10. Chattanooga Bend (2:59)
11. Sea of Heartbreak (2:41)
12. Rye Whiskey (1:57)
