= Gold Country (album) =

Studio album by Chuck Ragan
- Released: September 1, 2009
- Recorded: 2009 at Flying Whale Studios, Grass Valley, CA
- Genre: Folk rock, indie folk
- Length: 70:40
- Label: SideOneDummy
- Producer: Chuck Ragan

Chuck Ragan chronology
Feast or Famine (2007)	Gold Country (2009)	Covering Ground (2011)

Professional ratings
Review scores
Source	Rating
AbsolutePunk	(8.4/10)
Sputnikmusic	4.0/5 stars

Gold Country is the second studio album by Chuck Ragan, which was recorded in 2009 at Flying Whale Studios in Grass Valley, California. This is the first album fully produced by Chuck Ragan.

== Track listing ==
No.	Title	Length
1.	"For Goodness Sake"	3:32
2.	"Glory"	3:11
3.	"Rotterdam"	2:32
4.	"Done and Done"	2:29
5.	"The Trench"	2:22
6.	"Don't Say a Word"	4:24
7.	"10 West"	3:01
8.	"Old Diesel"	4:31
9.	"Cut Em Down"	2:37
10.	"Let It Rain"	2:33
11.	"Good Enough for Rock and Roll"	3:07
12.	"Get Em All Home"	5:45
13.	"Fire" (The entire track consists of the sound of fire.)	30:21
