= The Gamits =

American pop punk band

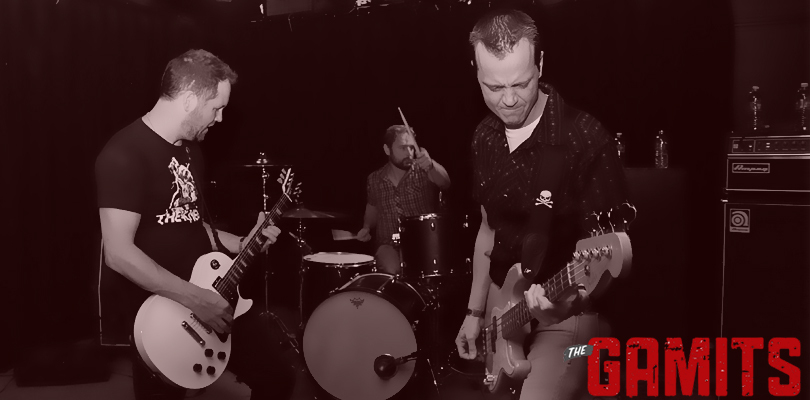
- The Gamits in Denver, 2012

Background information
- Origin: Denver, Colorado, U.S.
- Genres: Pop punk
- Years active: 1996–2005, 2009–present
- Labels: Paper + Plastick, Suburban Home Records
- Members: Chris Fogal; Forrest Bartosh; Johnny Wilson
- Past members: Matt Vanleuven; Matt Martinez; Luke Mathers; Brian Pentagram; Scott Swarers; Jason H. Walker; Scott Weigel
- Website: Official Website

The Gamits is an American pop punk band who formed in 1996. The band was disbanded in 2005 due to the members wishing to participate in and start other projects, but regrouped in late 2009. The current line-up is Chris Fogal on guitar and vocals, Forrest Bartosh on drums and Johnny Wilson on bass and background vocals.

== Discography ==
=== Studio albums ===
- 1996: Come Get Some (Drug Store Records)
- 1998: This Is My Boomstick (To The Left Records)
- 2000: Endorsed By You (Suburban Home Records)
- 2001: A Small Price To Pay (Suburban Home Records)
- 2004: Antidote (Suburban Home Records)
- 2010: Parts (Paper + Plastick)

=== Compilations ===
- 2002: Rose Harbor Anthems - Italian-only compilation (Wynona Records)
- 2003: Leaps and Bounds - Japanese-only compilation (CR Japan)
- 2006: Golden Sometimes - 4 disk box set (Suburban Home Records)
