= Alkaline Trio / Hot Water Music =

EP by Alkaline Trio and Hot Water Music
- Released: January 22, 2002
- Genre: Punk rock
- Length: 23:46
- Label: Jade Tree

Alkaline Trio chronology
From Here to Infirmary (2001)	Alkaline Trio / Hot Water Music (2002)	Good Mourning (2003)

Hot Water Music chronology
A Flight and a Crash (2001)	Alkaline Trio / Hot Water Music (2002)	Caution (2002)

Alkaline Trio / Hot Water Music is a split EP by Alkaline Trio and Hot Water Music, punk rock bands based in Chicago and Gainesville, Florida respectively. The EP was released on January 22, 2002, through Jade Tree.

In addition to new material, the EP features each band performing cover versions of songs from the other band's catalogue: Alkaline Trio covered Hot Water Music's “Rooftops” (from No Division) and Hot Water Music covered Alkaline Trio's “Radio” (from Maybe I'll Catch Fire) and “Bleeder” (from I Lied My Face Off).

This was the first release by Alkaline Trio with drummer Derek Grant, who replaced previous drummer Mike Felumlee in July 2001. Both bands later re-released their songs from the EP on compilation albums, with the tracks by Alkaline Trio appearing on Remains in 2007 and the tracks by Hot Water Music appearing on Till the Wheels Fall Off in January 2008.

The EP peaked at #36 on the Billboard Top Independent Charts in July 2002.

== Reception ==
Professional ratings
Review scores
Source	Rating
AllMusic	4/5 stars
PopMatters	Positive
Ox-Fanzine	Favourable

Critical reception to the EP was positive, with Kevin Hoskins of Allmusic calling "'Queen of Pain'" and "God Deciding" representative of each band's best material to date, specifically praising George Rebelo's drumming.

Jason Thompson of PopMatters praised the tracks by Alkaline Trio over Hot Water Music's, preferring Matt Skiba's singing voice to Chuck Ragan's, and remarking of the latter that "All too often the vocals are of that saliva drenched, back of the throat variety, which takes out a lot of the punch of this group, whose musical abilities are as tight as the Alkaline Trio's."

== Track listing ==
Alkaline Trio
No.	Title	Writer(s)	Length
1.	"Queen of Pain"	Matt Skiba; Dan Andriano; Derek Grant	3:57
2.	"While You're Waiting"	Skiba; Andriano; Grant	4:07
3.	"Rooftops" (originally performed by Hot Water Music)	Chuck Ragan; Chris Wollard; Jason Black; George Rebelo	2:15

Hot Water Music
No.	Title	Writer(s)	Length
4.	"'God Deciding'"	Ragan; Wollard; Black; Rebelo	2:37
5.	"Russian Roulette"	Ragan; Wollard; Black; Rebelo	3:25
6.	"Radio" (originally performed by Alkaline Trio)	Skiba; Andriano; Glenn Porter	4:12
7.	"Bleeder" (originally performed by Alkaline Trio)	Skiba; Andriano; Porter	3:13
Total length:			23:46

== Personnel ==
=== Alkaline Trio ===
- Matt Skiba – guitar, lead vocals
- Dan Andriano – bass, backing vocals
- Derek Grant – drums

=== Hot Water Music ===
- Chuck Ragan – guitar, lead vocals
- Chris Wollard – guitar, lead vocals
- Jason Black – bass
- George Rebelo – drums
