= Exister =

Studio album by Hot Water Music
- Released: May 15, 2012
- Recorded: January 19 – February 12, 2012 at The Blasting Room, Fort Collins, Colorado
- Genres: Punk rock, post-hardcore
- Length: 37:57
- Label: Rise Records
- Producer: Bill Stevenson

Hot Water Music chronology
Till the Wheels Fall Off (2008)	Exister (2012)

Singles from Exister
- 1. "Drag My Body" Released: March 28, 2012; 2. "State of Grace" Released: April 20, 2012

Professional ratings
Aggregate scores
Source	Rating
Metacritic	74/100
Review scores
Source	Rating
AllMusic	3.5/5 stars
Consequence	C+
The A.V. Club	C−
Louder Sound	3.5/5 stars
Sputnikmusic	4/5
BBC Music	(positive)

Exister is the seventh full-length album by Hot Water Music, which was released by Rise Records on May 15, 2012. Exister is Hot Water Music's first original full-length album in eight years, since 2004's The New What Next.

== Track listing ==
No.	Title	Length
1.	"Mainline"	2:32
2.	"Boy, You're Gonna Hurt Someone"	2:34
3.	"State of Grace"	2:22
4.	"Drown in It"	2:43
5.	"Drag My Body"	3:21
6.	"Safety"	2:50
7.	"Exister"	3:01
8.	"Wrong Way"	3:47
9.	"Take No Prisoners"	3:13
10.	"Pledge Wore Thin"	3:01
11.	"No End Left in Sight"	3:15
12.	"The Traps"	2:47
13.	"Paid in Full"	2:33
Total length:		37:57

== Personnel ==
- Chuck Ragan – guitar, vocals
- Chris Wollard – guitar, vocals
- Jason Black – bass
- George Rebelo – drums

== Charts ==
Chart performance
Chart (2012)	Peak position
Canadian Albums (Nielsen SoundScan)	96
German Albums (Offizielle Top 100)	59
UK Independent Albums (Official Charts)	40
UK Rock & Metal Albums (Official Charts)	11
US Billboard 200	34
US Independent Albums (Billboard)	8
US Tastemaker Albums (Billboard)	13
US Top Alternative Albums (Billboard)	11
US Top Hard Rock Albums (Billboard)	3
US Top Rock Albums (Billboard)	15
