= Suburban Home Records =

- Founded: 1995
- Founder: Virgil Dickerson
- Status: Active
- Genre: Pop-punk; Alt-Country; Indie rock
- Country of origin: United States
- Location: Denver, Colorado
- Official website: www.suburbanhomerecords.com

Suburban Home Records and Distribution is a record label based in Denver, Colorado, United States. The label was founded in 1995 by Virgil Dickerson, and is known for focusing on vinyl releases and bands in the pop-punk and alt-country genres. Its roster has included Two Cow Garage, Drag the River, Oblivion, The Gamits, and Apocalypse Hoboken. In 2006 the label founded the Vinyl Collective, an online store that serves as a community hub for independent vinyl collectors.

== History ==
Suburban Home was founded and continues to be operated by Virgil Dickerson. Dickerson, who was attending college in Boulder, Colorado at University of Colorado Boulder, had started the first pop punkfanzine for the local scene in September 1995. He named the fanzine Suburban Home after the song "Suburban Home" by The Descendents. He then booked shows at the campus-run Club 156 from 1995 to 1997, and began booking shows across Colorado as well.

Some of Dickerson's friends started bands and needed a label to release their first records, so he created a record label under the name Suburban Home in 1996. The label began releasing local pop-punk albums on seven-inch vinyl and home-burned CDs. The first release was the Orange County band Overlap in the summer of 1996. The second release was by The Fairlanes. Early on the label also put out the compilation album Punk: It's All About the Orchis Factor, which included early releases by bands such as Blink-182, Oblivion, and FOUR! The label initially operated distribution by mail order only, advertising in various music magazines.

In 1997 Dickerson moved to work as manager at Hopeless Records in Los Angeles, who had just signed Against All Authority. After about a year he moved back to Denver, Colorado to run Suburban Home full-time. In 1998 the label opened a music retail store in Denver called Bakamono, which sold music, clothing, books, and fanzines. The store did well for a time, then closed a year later. The label started selling online in 1999. After the release of It's Crazy by Drag the River in 2000, the label began branching out from pop-punk and releasing alt-country and Americana albums as well.

Suburban Home is currently an established distributor and show promoter, and in 2011 the label helped support the creation of the Colorado label Greater Than.

=== The Vinyl Collective ===
Suburban Home Records focused on vinyl releases from its inception, only to abandon vinyl in the late 1990s and early 2000s when the format went out of style. In 2006 the label again began releasing vinyl, starting with bands like Every Time I Die and Fear Before the March of Flames. The releases did well and the label started the online vinyl community Vinyl Collective, which quickly grew in popularity. The Vinyl Collective serves as both a blog and a vinyl-only online record store.

The Vinyl Collective has released vinyl by bands such as Minus the Bear, Every Time I Die, and Portugal the Man. In January 2011 the Vinyl Collective was acquired by Fork Radio Inc., Mightier Than Swords Records and Academy Fight Song. It was relaunched in February 2011 as a community for independent vinyl collectors.

== Artists ==
=== Current ===
- Alone at 3am
- Armchair Martian
- Austin Lucas
- Chad Price
- Drag The River
- The Gamits
- In The Red
- Joey Cape of Lagwagon
- Jon Snodgrass of Armchair Martian
- Josh Small
- Jr. Juggernaut
- Kay Kay and His Weathered Underground
- Lizzie Huffman
- Look Mexico
- Michael Dean Damon
- Mike Hale
- Nightmares For A Week
- Ninja Gun
- Oblivion
- The Playing Favorites
- The Takers
- Tim Barry of Avail
- Two Cow Garage
- Yesterday's Ring

=== Former ===
- Adventures of Jet
- Apocalypse Hoboken
- The Fairlanes
- Ghost Buffalo
- The Kite-Eating Tree
- LaGrecia
- Laymen Terms
- Love Me Destroyer
- The Revenge
- Scott Reynolds and the Steaming Beast
- Useless ID
- Stereotyperider

== See also ==
- [neetesh Choudhary ]
