= Manchester (album) =

Studio album by Tim Barry
- Released: November 4, 2008
- Genre: Folk
- Label: Suburban Home

Tim Barry chronology
Rivanna Junction (2006)	Manchester (2008)

Professional ratings
Review scores
Source	Rating
Punknews.org	link

Manchester is the third full-length album by Tim Barry.

== Track listing ==
1. "Texas Cops" – 2:13
2. "On And On" – 2:40
3. "South Hill" – 3:54
4. "5 Twenty 5" – 4:10
5. "This November" – 2:28
6. "Sagacity Gone" – 2:57
7. "Ronnie Song" – 3:15
8. "C.R.F. (Retired)" – 2:51
9. "Tacoma" – 3:43
10. "Tile Work" – 2:23
11. "222" – 4:15
12. "Raised And Grown" – 4:03
