= Gods Reflex =

American emo band

- Also known as: God's Reflex
- Origin: Rockford, Illinois, U.S.
- Genres: Emo; Punk rock; Indie rock
- Years active: mid-1990s–2003; 2007–2008
- Label: Johann's Face
- Past members: Zach Newman; Phil Goudreau; Marcus Spitzmiller; Jesse Carmona; Nick Alberts

Gods Reflex (also styled God's Reflex) was an American emo and punk rock band from Rockford, Illinois. Its principal lineup consisted of bassist and vocalist Zach Newman, guitarists Phil Goudreau and Marcus Spitzmiller, and drummer Jesse Carmona. The group released two albums through Chicago label Johann's Face Records, A Brief Lesson in Affection (1998) and Scenes from a Motel Seduction (2000), before breaking up in 2002. Newman, Spitzmiller, and Carmona later reunited to record a third album, When It's Down to This (2008).

== History ==
Gods Reflex formed in the mid-1990s and released several seven-inch singles and split records before its first album. The band toured on the DIY circuit between the 1998 release of A Brief Lesson in Affection and its follow-up. The four-song Shifting seven-inch, released by Rebound Records after the debut album, marked a change in the band's sound according to a contemporary review in A Different Kind of Greatness. Scenes from a Motel Seduction was recorded at Kingsize Sound Laboratories with producer and engineer Dave Trumfio and released on May 30, 2000.

Spitzmiller left later in 2000 and was replaced by Nick Alberts. The group subsequently continued as a trio and contributed the song "Talk to Me" to a local compilation before disbanding in May 2002. It played a final show at Chicago's Fireside Bowl in February 2003.

Newman, Spitzmiller, and Carmona began working together again in 2007. What started as material for a new group developed into another Gods Reflex album, and the trio self-released When It's Down to This in February 2008. The reunion lasted for several live performances before the band became inactive again. In April 2011, Australian publication The Music reported that Newman and Spitzmiller had posted archival acoustic performances online and intended to publish more.

== Musical style and reception ==
AllMusic biographer Jason Ankeny characterized Gods Reflex as a punk band with a power-pop melodic approach. Reviewing Scenes from a Motel Seduction, AllMusic's Kurt Morris compared the band to Jawbreaker and noted the album's movement between fast punk passages and introspective sections, as well as its cryptic lyrics. Tim Den of Lollipop Magazine described the album as clean-guitar emo with a Midwestern influence and a trace of rock. John Heisel's review for A Different Kind of Greatness described Shifting as a musical and lyrical advance over the debut, emphasizing the record's dynamic shifts and the interplay between Newman's lead vocals and Goudreau's backing vocals.

In 2010, Alternative Press included the group in its retrospective series "Bands That Time Forgot", with Scott Heisel describing its place in the pre-2000 Northern Illinois emo scene. The following year, a bassist for Turnover named Gods Reflex among his personal influences in an interview with The Music.

== Discography ==
=== Studio albums ===
- A Brief Lesson in Affection (1998, Johann's Face)
- Scenes from a Motel Seduction (2000, Johann's Face)
- When It's Down to This (2008, ReFlex Productions)

=== Other releases ===
- Shifting (seven-inch, Rebound Records)
