= Feast or Famine (Chuck Ragan album) =

Studio album by Chuck Ragan
- Released: August 7, 2007
- Recorded: 2007 at Mad Dog Studios
- Length: 45:48
- Label: SideOneDummy / No Idea Records
- Producer: Ted Hutt, Ryan Mall

Chuck Ragan chronology
Feast or Famine (2007)	Gold Country (2009)

Professional ratings
Review scores
Source	Rating
AllMusic	4.5/5 stars

Feast or Famine is the debut studio album by Chuck Ragan. It was recorded in 2007 at Mad Dog Studios in Burbank, California. It was produced by Ted Hutt, engineered by Ryan Mall and mixed by both Hutt and Mall.

== Track listing ==
No.	Title	Length
1.	"The Boat"	3:20
2.	"For Broken Ears"	3:43
3.	"California Burritos"	2:44
4.	"Geraldine"	4:04
5.	"It's What You Will"	2:58
6.	"Do You Pray"	3:04
7.	"Don't Cry"	2:37
8.	"Symmetry"	3:35
9.	"Between the Lines"	2:59
10.	"Hearts of Stone"	3:10
11.	"The Grove"	2:52
12.	"Do What You Do" (The last seven minutes of the track are the sounds of ocean waves crashing on the beach.)	10:42
