= Till the Wheels Fall Off =

Album by Hot Water Music

Compilation album by Hot Water Music
- Released: January 22, 2008
- Genre: Punk rock
- Label: No Idea Records

Hot Water Music chronology
The New What Next (2004)	Till the Wheels Fall Off (2008)	Exister (2012)

Professional ratings
Review scores
Source	Rating
Allmusic	link

Till the Wheels Fall Off is a B-sides and rarities compilation album by the Gainesville, Florida-based band Hot Water Music.

== Track listing ==
All tracks are written by Chuck Ragan, Chris Wollard, Jason Black, and George Rebello, except where noted.

No.	Title	From	Length
1.	"Kill the Night"	Rock Against Bush, Vol. 2, 2004	2:42
2.	"Last Goodbyes"	Punk-O-Rama 10, 2005	3:01
3.	"Seein' Diamonds"	Punk-O-Rama Vol. 9, 2004	3:38
4.	"Home"	previously unreleased	3:12
5.	"So Many Days"	Bonus Track on 'A Flight and A Crash" vinyl version 2001	3:36
6.	"'God Deciding'"	Alkaline Trio / Hot Water Music, 2002	2:37
7.	"Russian Roulette"	Alkaline Trio / Hot Water Music, 2002	3:25
8.	"Radio" (Matt Skiba, Dan Andriano, Glenn Porter; originally performed by Alkaline Trio)	Alkaline Trio / Hot Water Music, 2002	4:12
9.	"Bleeder" (Skiba, Andriano, Porter; originally performed by Alkaline Trio)	Alkaline Trio / Hot Water Music, 2002	3:12
10.	"Caught Up"	BYO Split Series Volume I, 1999	2:11
11.	"Wrong and Righteous"	BYO Split Series Volume I, 1999	2:23
12.	"Take It as It Comes"	BYO Split Series Volume I, 1999	1:55
13.	"Wayfarer"	Punk-O-Rama 7, 2002	2:58
14.	"Jaded Eyes" (John Stabb, Tom Lyle, J. Robbins, Peter Moffett; originally performed by Government Issue)	Living Tomorrow Today: A Benefit for Ty Cambra, 2001	3:34
15.	"Dreamworld" (Jim Moginie, Peter Garrett, Rob Hirst; originally performed by Midnight Oil)	Plea for Peace / Take Action, 2001	3:49
16.	"Prince of the Rodeo" (Hank Von Helvete, Knut Schreiner, Rune Rebellion, Pål Pot Pamparius, Happy-Tom, Chris Summers; originally performed by Turbonegro)	Alpha Motherfuckers, 2001	3:35
17.	"Moments Pass"	Moonpies for Misfits, 1999	3:37
18.	"Another Way"	Moonpies for Misfits, 1999	3:47
19.	"Moonpies for Misfits"	Moonpies for Misfits, 1999	3:37
20.	"Wild in the Streets" (written and originally performed by Garland Jeffreys)	Twelve Ounces of Courage, 1999	2:42
21.	"Clampdown" (Joe Strummer, Mick Jones; originally performed by The Clash)	City Rockers: A Tribute to The Clash, 1999	3:36
22.	"No Surrender" (written and originally performed by Bruce Springsteen)	No Idea 100: Redefiling Music, 2000	3:51
23.	"Springtime" (Frankie Stubbs, Dickie Hammond; originally performed by Leatherface)	Return of the Read Menace, 1999	3:26
