= Chuck Ragan =

American musician (born 1974)

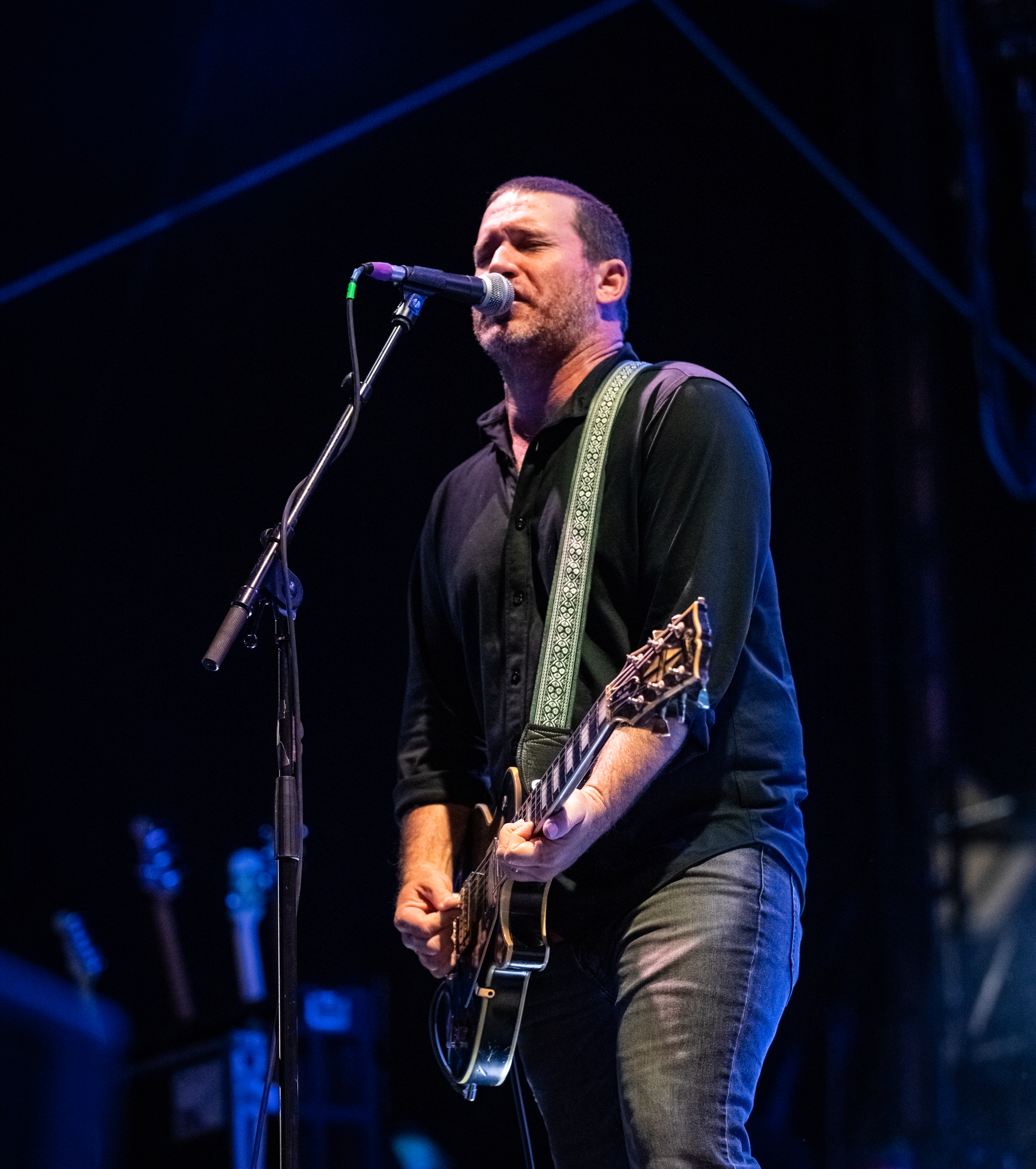
- Ragan live with Hot Water Music at Rock am Ring 2019

Background information
- Born: Charles Allen Ragan; October 30, 1974 (age 51)
- Genres: Folk rock, punk rock, folk punk
- Years active: 1993–present
- Labels: SideOneDummy, TenFour, No Idea, Dine Alone, Rise
- Website: chuckraganmusic.com

Charles Allen Ragan (born October 30, 1974) is an American singer, songwriter, guitarist, and author. He is the guitarist and vocalist of the band Hot Water Music. Ragan has also authored a book and released a variety of solo material, including five studio albums, two soundtracks, and two live albums, among other releases.

== Early and personal life ==
Chuck Ragan is the son of former PGA and Ryder Cup golfer Dave Ragan and gospel singer and missionary Geraldine Ragan.

Ragan is married. He and his wife have a son who was born in May 2015.

== Hot Water Music ==
From October 1994 until 2006 Ragan was one of the lead singers for Gainesville, Florida-based punk rock band Hot Water Music. The group disbanded on good terms in 2005, and the other three members went on to form punk band The Draft, while Ragan continued a solo career playing mostly acoustic folk inspired music similar in tone to a former acoustic Hot Water Music side project called Rumbleseat signing to Side One Dummy Records. Hot Water Music reunited in 2007 for a tour across the United States and Europe, and in 2012, released a new album, Exister.

== Tours ==
Chuck Ragan, Tim Barry and Ben Nichols toured in the fall of 2008. Chuck Ragan was also a support act on Frank Turner's 2010 tour of the UK, and supported The Gaslight Anthem during their 2010 European Fall tour. Ragan was the opener on the Social Distortion west coast tour in late January and February 2011.

=== The Revival Tour ===
In 2005, Ragan conceptualized the idea of The Revival Tour, a collaborative acoustic event featuring several punk rock, bluegrass, and alt-country performers. Ragan has stated that the tour is about "sharing music together" and "bringing it to people in an extremely honest and grassroots fashion."

On each tour the artists were accompanied by a fiddle player, Jon Gaunt, and an upright bass player. In 2008 and 2009, German Americana singer, Digger Barnes played the upright bass. In 2011, 2012, and 2013, the upright bass was played by Joe Ginsberg.

==== Beginnings ====
The first Revival Tour in 2008 featured Avail's Tim Barry and Lucero's Ben Nichols, with guest appearances from Laura Jane Grace of Against Me!, Kevin Seconds, Jon Snodgrass of Drag the River, Jesse Malin of D Generation, Chris McCaughan of The Lawrence Arms, Austin Lucas, and Frank Turner.

==== 2009–2012 ====
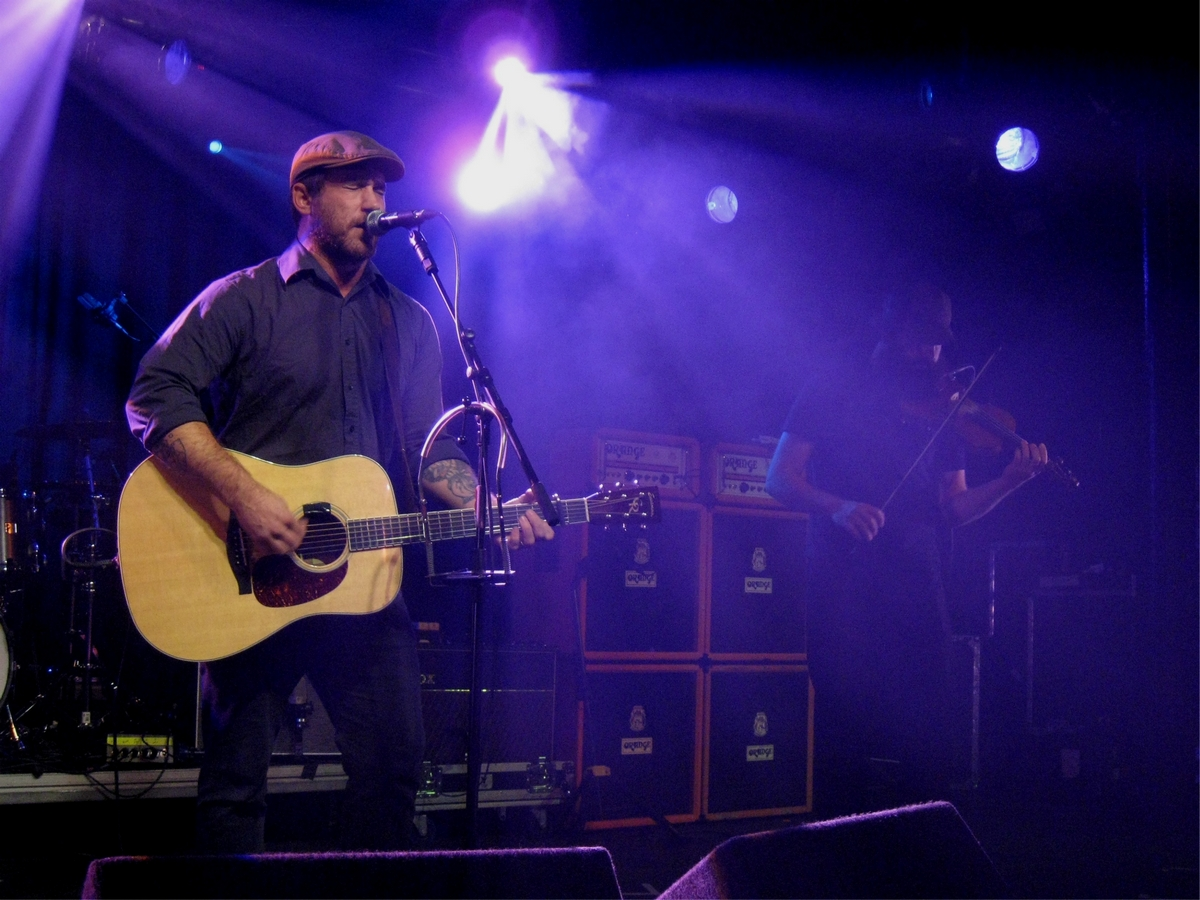
Ragan performing with Jon Gaunt in Nottingham (November 16, 2010) while touring with The Gaslight Anthem

In 2010, The Revival Tour journeyed across Australia, featuring Ragan, Barry, Nichols, Frank Turner, Jen Buxton of Like...Alaska, Darren Gibson, and Jamie Hay, accompanied by Jon Gaunt on fiddle and Todd Beene (of Glossary and Lucero) on pedal steel guitar. The Tour was concluded with a one-off performance at the Punk Rock Bowling festival in Las Vegas, Nevada, featuring Ragan, Nichols, Kevin Seconds, Steve Soto, John Carey of Old Man Markley, and Flogging Molly's Matt Hensley and Nathen Maxwell.

The 2011 Revival Tour featured Brian Fallon of The Gaslight Anthem, Dave Hause of The Loved Ones, and Dan Andriano of Alkaline Trio, as well as guest appearances from Helen Chambers, Sam Russo, Jimmy Islip, Brian Brody, and Franz Nicolay In 2012, Ragan, Andriano, Laura Jane Grace, Cory Branan, Ben Kweller and Nathaniel Rateliff performed across the United States and Canada for the Tour's spring leg, with guest appearances by Jenny Owen Youngs, Dave Hause, and Kayleigh Goldsworthy. In the autumn of the same year, a European leg of the Tour featured Ragan, Branan, Emily Barker, Rocky Votolato, and Jay Malinowski of Bedouin Soundclash.

== Musical projects ==
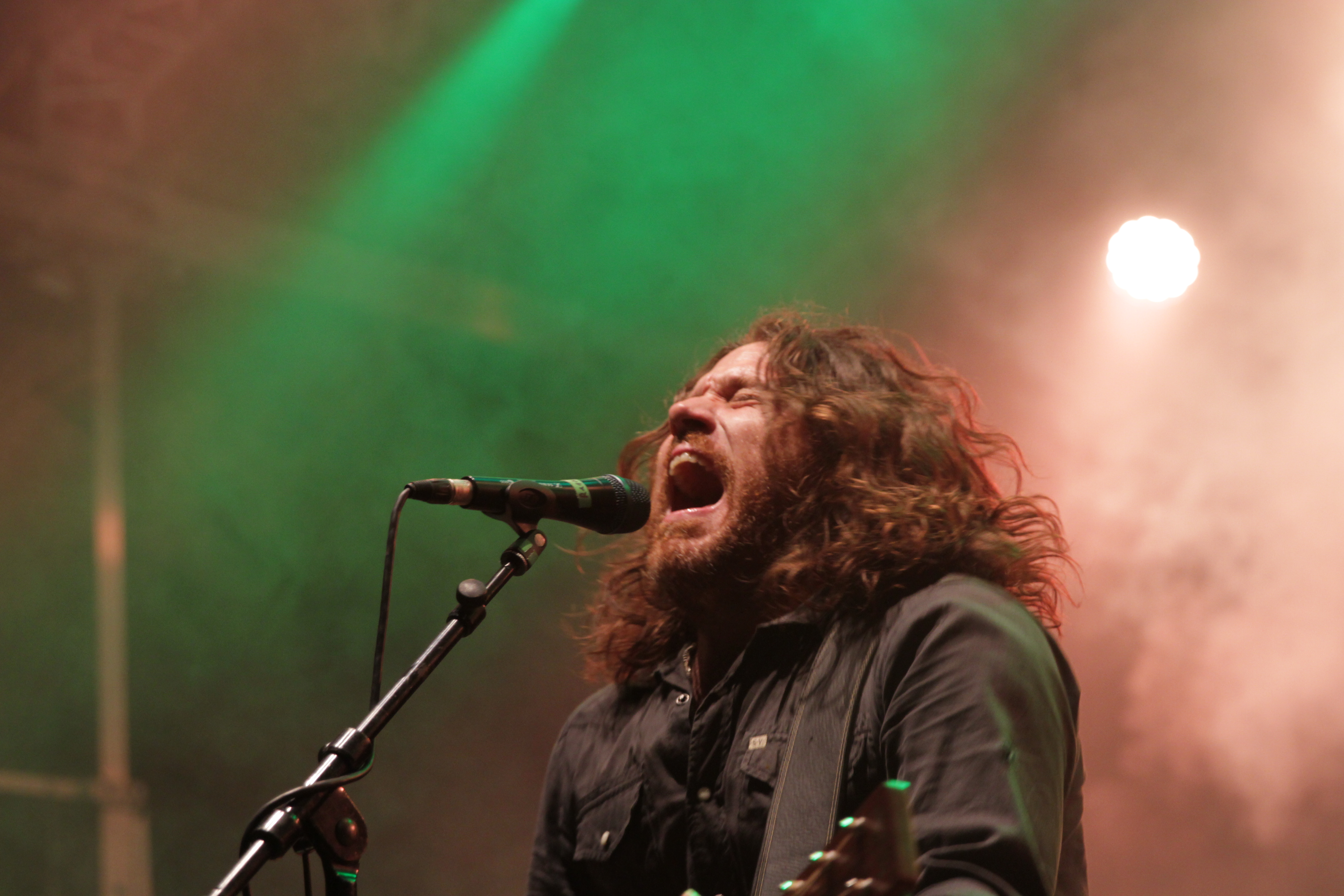
Ragan at Rock Camp 2014, Germany

In a February 12, 2010, interview, Chuck commented that he was working on an album with Brian Fallon, frontman for the Gaslight Anthem. Since then, Fallon's vocals appeared on Ragan's song "Meet You In The Middle." Ragan released a four-way split with underground UK singer-songwriters Sam Russo, Helen Chambers and Jimmy Islip in 2011.

On November 21, 2013, Chuck announced that his next solo album with Todd Beene of Lucero and Glossary, Jon Gaunt, Joe Ginsberg, David Hidalgo Jr. of Social Distortion, Rami Jaffee of The Wallflowers and Foo Fighters, Christopher Thorn of Blind Melon that would be titled 'Till Midnight and released in 2014 on Side One Dummy.

In November 2023, Chuck signed with Rise Records. On October 25, 2024, he released his fifth solo studio album, Love & Lore.

== Other projects ==
In 2012, Ragan released a book of tour stories entitled "The Road Most Traveled." The book is said to be "more than just a collection of anecdotes, it's as much a handbook of how to act on tour as it is a cautionary tale of what not to do if you want to sustain this lifestyle for years to come."

In 2014, Ragan began working on the soundtrack for "The Flame in the Flood", a video game developed by the indie game company The Molasses Flood.

== Discography ==
=== Studio albums ===
- 2007 Feast or Famine – SideOneDummy / No Idea Records
- 2009 Gold Country – SideOneDummy / TenFour Records
- 2011 Covering Ground – SideOneDummy / TenFour Records
- 2014 Till Midnight – SideOneDummy / Dine Alone Records
- 2024 Love & Lore – Rise Records

=== Split albums/Collaborations ===
- 2008 Bristle Ridge – with Austin Lucas – Hometown Caravan – LP (Ltd. European Tour Ed.) / Ten Four Records (Collaboration)
- 2009 Anderson Family Bluegrass / Chuck Ragan – Stowaway Sound / Ten Four Records (Split LP)
- 2010 Chuck Ragan / Darren Gibson Poison City Records (Split LP)
- 2010 Ravi / Chuck Ragan – Cursing Concrete (Rumbleseat cover) / Masses EP, self-published
- 2011 Chuck Ragan / Sam Russo / Jimmy Islip / Helen Chambers' / Specialist Subject Releases (Collaboration)
- 2014 Kindred Spirit (split EP with Rocky Votolato)

=== Soundtracks ===
- 2013: "It's Better in the Wind" Soundtrack – TenFour Records
- 2016: The Flame in the Flood – TenFour Records

=== Live albums ===
- 2006: Live at the Troubadour – Self-Release (CD-R)
- 2007: Los Feliz – SideOneDummy (CD/LP)
- 2009: Live at Hafenkneipe Zürich – Leech Records (LP – Ltd. to 1500 copies)
- 2009: Chuck plays Frankfurt – Fanclub (DoLP – Ltd. to 300 hand-numbered copies)
- 2009: Live from Rock Island: The Daytrotter Sessions – Side One Dummy Records (10" Vinyl)
- 2010: Live at Cafe Du Nord(CD/LP)
- 2016: The Winter Haul Live - TenFour Records

=== Singles ===
- The 7-Inch Club – 2006–2007, No Idea Records (Ragan released a series of seven singles, one per month, referred to collectively as "The 7-Inch Club" because only those who had pre-ordered the entire set ahead of time could obtain copies.) The series was also pressed on a CD entitled The Blueprint Sessions which accompanied the final mailing of the 7-Inch Club.
- "Something May Catch Fire"
- "Rotterdam" 2009

=== Music videos ===
- "You and I Alone"
- "Something May Catch Fire"
- "Nomad by Fate (Punks in Vegas Session)"
- "Vagabond"
