= Till Midnight (album) =

Studio album by Chuck Ragan
- Released: March 25, 2014
- Genre: Folk rock, indie folk
- Length: 36:15
- Label: SideOneDummy
- Producer: Christopher Thorn

Chuck Ragan chronology
Covering Ground (2011)	Till Midnight (2014)

Singles from Till Midnight
- 1. "Something May Catch Fire" Released: March 10, 2014

Till Midnight is the fourth studio album by Chuck Ragan, which was recorded in 2013 and produced by Christopher Thorn. The album was recorded at the Fireside Sound and Fonogenic Studios in Los Angeles. Guest vocalists include Ben Nichols (of Lucero), Dave Hause (of The Loved Ones), Jenny O., Chad Price, and Jon Snodgrass (of Drag the River).

== Critical reception ==
Professional ratings
Review scores
Source	Rating
Absolute Punk	9/10
Alternative Press	4.5/5 stars
Outburn	9/10

At Alternative Press, Jason Schreurs rated the album four-and-a-half stars, stating that "there aren't many stronger Americana albums than Till Midnight." Amy Sciarretto of Outburn rated the album a nine out of ten, writing that the release "is distinctly American, and it's the kind of folk rock that appeals to the tattooed punk rockers."

== Track listing ==
No.	Title	Length
1.	"Something May Catch Fire"	3:52
2.	"Vagabond" (featuring Ben Nichols, Jon Snodgrass, and Chad Price)	3:53
3.	"Non Typical" (featuring Jenny O.)	4:08
4.	"Revved" (featuring Dave Hause)	3:13
5.	"Bedroll Lullaby"	3:24
6.	"Gave My Heart Out" (featuring Dave Hause)	3:06
7.	"Wake with You"	3:11
8.	"You and I Alone"	3:56
9.	"Whistleblowers Song"	2:54
10.	"For All We Care"	4:38
