= Sweet Empire =

Sweet Empire is a Dutch punk rock band from the Amsterdam area. Besides punk rock the music has been styled as pop punk, power pop, or melodic hardcore.

== History ==
Sweet Empire was formed June 2008 by Rowald van Baardwijk, Rick Diemeer, Jort van de Ven, and Lionn van der Horst. The members knew each other from their local music scene.

The band's first performance was in October 2008. In 2009 the band won a local band competition and performed on the main stage of the Beeckestijn Pop festival. Two month later the band toured the United Kingdom for the first time and the first recordings were made. Later that year Van Der Horst decided to leave the band and was replaced on drums by Koen Fakkeldij. In 2010 Van Der Horst started a new band called Wanderlust.

In 2010 the band released its first 7-inch and compact cassette EP entitled "The Flood" via Black Death. Furthermore, the band played more shows throughout the UK, Belgium, and Germany.

Early 2011 the band released a split-cd with Oliver John Ward. In May the band recorded their first full length album. "This Season Needs Torches" was released on September 1, 2011, via Shield Recordings in the Benelux. The album was released on 12-inch vinyl and cd. After the release the band toured intensively throughout Europe.

In 2012 and 2013 the band continued to uphold a heavy touring schedule. In 2013 the band also released a split 7-inch with Fighting Fiction from the UK. Again Shield Recordings released this 7-inch in the Benelux, but Lockjaw Records (UK), and LaserLife Records (AT) released the vinyl as well. Late 2013 Trilob Records released a cassette, entitled 'Cause Vinyl Is For Hipsters, containing all ep's and 7-inches the band released to that date.

2014 was the year the band recorded and released their second full-length, "Old Ideas Keep Fighting Us", containing 13 new songs. The record was released on September 1 on CD and 12-inch vinyl via Shield Recordings (BeNeLux), Gunner Records (DE), and LaserLife Records (AT). As with all previous releases the album was recorded with Nico van Montfort of XPZ Sound. After the release the band took on their regular touring schedule again and toured throughout Europe.

Until 2019 the band toured on the release of "Old Ideas Keep Fighting Us". Playing shows all around Europe, including Manchester Punk Festival in 2017. During 2018 the band started recording their third full-length, "A New Cycle", with Perimeter Audio. The album was released on April 1, 2019.

== Members ==
- Rowald van Baardwijk – vocals (2008–present)
- Jort van de Ven – guitar/vocals (2008–present)
- Rick Diemeer – bass (2008–present)
- Koen Fakkeldij – drums (2009–present)
- Lionn van der Horst – drums (2008–2009)

== Discography ==
- The Flood - 7-inch/CD/Cassette - (Black Death, 2010)
- Sweet Empire/Oliver John Ward split - CD - (North Empire Records, 2011)
- This Season Needs Torches - CD/LP - (Shield Recordings, 2011)
- Fighting Fiction/Sweet Empire split - 7-inch - (Shield Recordings/Lockjaw Records/LaserLife Records, 2013)
- 'Cause Vinyl Is For Hipsters - Cassette - (Trilob Records/North Empire Records, 2013)
- Old Ideas Keep Fighting Us - CD/LP - (Shield Recordings/Gunner Records/LaserLife Records, 2014)
- A New Cycle - CD/LP - (Shield Recordings/Umlaut Records/Bad Wolf Records/North Empire Records, 2019)
