= Hot Water Music =

American post-hardcore band

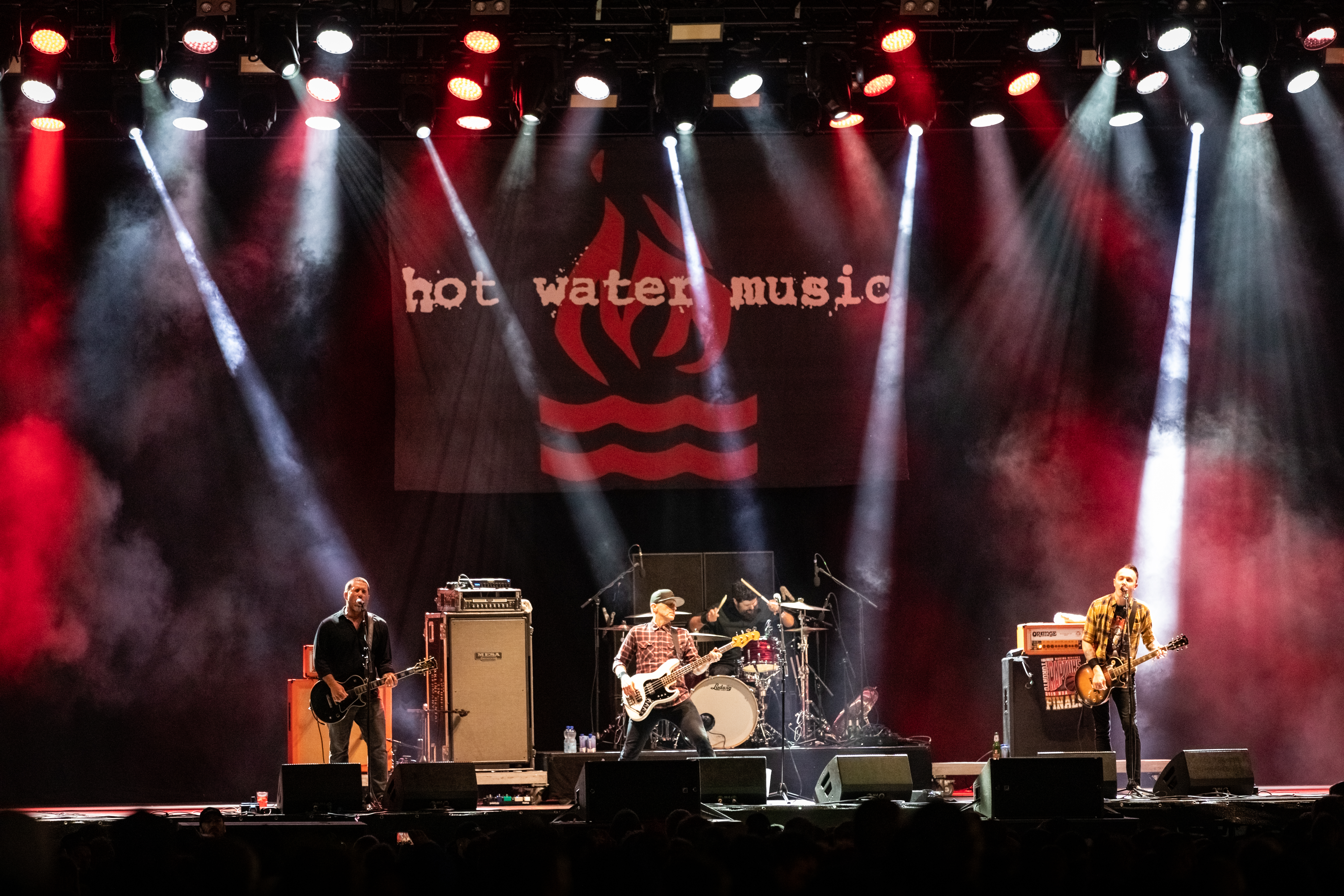
- Hot Water Music performing at Rock am Ring in 2019.

Background information
- Also known as: The Hot Water Music Band
- Origin: Gainesville, Florida, U.S.
- Genres: Punk rock; post-hardcore; emo
- Years active: 1994–1998; 1998–2006; 2008–present
- Labels: Doghouse; End Hits; Epitaph; Equal Vision; No Idea; Rise
- Members: Chuck Ragan; Chris Wollard; Jason Black; George Rebelo; Chris Cresswell
- Website: hotwatermusic.com

Hot Water Music is an American punk rock band formed in October 1994 and based in Gainesville, Florida. Since their formation, the group has consisted of Chuck Ragan and Chris Wollard on shared lead vocals and guitars, bass guitarist Jason Black, and drummer George Rebelo. Since 2017, the band has also included guitarist-vocalist Chris Cresswell. The band initially broke up in August 1998, but reformed by October 1998. The group split up again in 2006, but has remained active since 2008.

== Background ==
=== Early history (1994–1998) ===
Ragan, Black, and Rebelo initially met while living in Sarasota. Black and Rebelo had played together in jazz bands in school. Ragan and Rebelo met while working at eateries on the same street, with the corner becoming a frequent gathering place for Sarasota musicians. As Wollard was based in Bradenton at the time, he met the other three at a storage facility which was frequently used as a rehearsal space for both Sarasota and Bradenton bands. Frustrated by the lack of musical opportunities in their respective hometowns, Black, who had been attending the University of Florida for a year, recommended that the other three join him in Gainesville, a city known for its historic and contemporary music scene.

Upon moving to Gainesville and variously filling in as performers in each other's bands Fossil and Thread, the four joined as Hot Water Music in October 1994. The band's name was taken from a collection of short stories by Charles Bukowski of the same name.

The band played its first show at the Ringling School of Art in Sarasota, Florida in the fall of 1994. After rapidly releasing a series of singles splits, and EPs, the band released their first two LPs in 1997, Fuel for the Hate Game and Forever and Counting, the latter of which was released under the temporary moniker The Hot Water Music Band due legal concerns on the part of the band's label Doghouse Records regarding an unrelated record titled Hot Water Music by Elektra Records band Hot Water that same year. Due to what Chuck Ragan characterized as "misunderstandings on both sides" over Forever and Counting, Hot Water Music ended its partnership with Doghouse.

The band's rigorous touring exhausted the members and strained their personal relationships. Tensions came to a head on a European tour and Hot Water Music decided to break up for the sake of preserving their friendships with each other. After finishing the rest of their dates in Europe and returning to Florida, they spent three months apart and then reconvened for rehearsals for a farewell show. The rehearsals went unexpectedly well, so much so that the band wound up writing four new songs. By the time they performed the gig, in Gainesville on August 28, 1998, the band had settled their differences. During the show, Ragan announced to the audience, "I'm sure a lot of people here came a long way tonight because they heard this was our last show. I don't know what to tell you guys...we're trying to keep it going." The performance from this show was recorded and released as the live album Live at the Hardback.

=== First reunion (1998–2006) ===
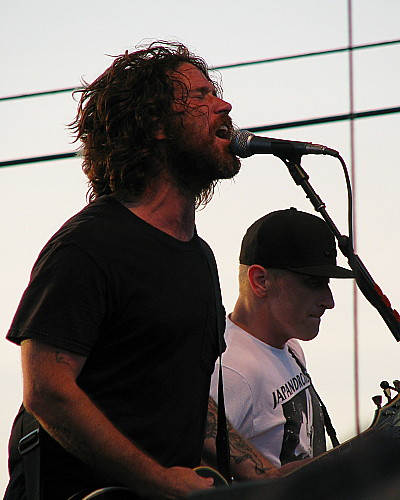
Ragan and Black at The Stone Pony's Summer Stage in Asbury Park, New Jersey on June 22, 2013.

On October 26, 1998, Hot Water Music announced their reformation, playing their comeback show on December 5, 1998, at the Hardback Cafe. In promotion of the band's upcoming album No Division on Some Records, scheduled for release in September 1999, Hot Water Music toured the United States with Discount, Elliott and Leatherface, from May to June 1999. A tour of Europe and the United Kingdom was then booked, originally intended to be shared with fellow Gainesville hardcore band As Friends Rust, but due to disagreements over top-billing, the two bands ended up booking separate tours. The incident also caused the cancellation of a split 7-inch vinyl the two bands had planned to release through Good Life Recordings in promotion of the tour. As Friends Rust ultimately headlined its own tour with Ensign and Ignite, while Hot Water Music invited Discount back to open for them on their European dates. Hot Water Music ended the year by embarking on a month and a half American and Canadian tour opening for Sick of It All, AFI, and Indecision.

The band next signed to Epitaph Records, releasing three more albums, 2001's A Flight and a Crash, their commercial breakthrough Caution in 2002, and their final record The New What Next, before disbanding in 2005. In promotion of The New What Next, Hot Water Music embarked on a six-week North American tour supported by Florida post-hardcore band Moments in Grace, which spanned from October 13 to November 21, 2004 The package tour also included Alexisonfire from October 13 to November 13; Don't Look Down from October 13–23; Planes Mistaken for Stars from October 23 to November 21; and Silverstein from November 15–21. Engine Down was initially to be on the tour but was replaced by Silverstein. The trip took the bands through the United States' West Coast, South and East Coast, followed by two dates in Canada, and finished in the American Midwest. It also included a stop to play The Fest 3 festival in Gainesville, Florida on October 31, 2004.

In late 2005, Hot Water Music announced through the No Idea Records website that they would be going on a hiatus following Chuck Ragan's departure, citing "family" reasons. While this was initially intended as a temporary hiatus, the band announced in 2006 that the break would be permanent. The three remaining members then started a new project, The Draft, whose first album, In a Million Pieces, was released on September 12, 2006. Chuck Ragan continued with a primarily-acoustic solo project, releasing his debut record Feast or Famine in 2007.

=== Second reunion (2008–present) ===
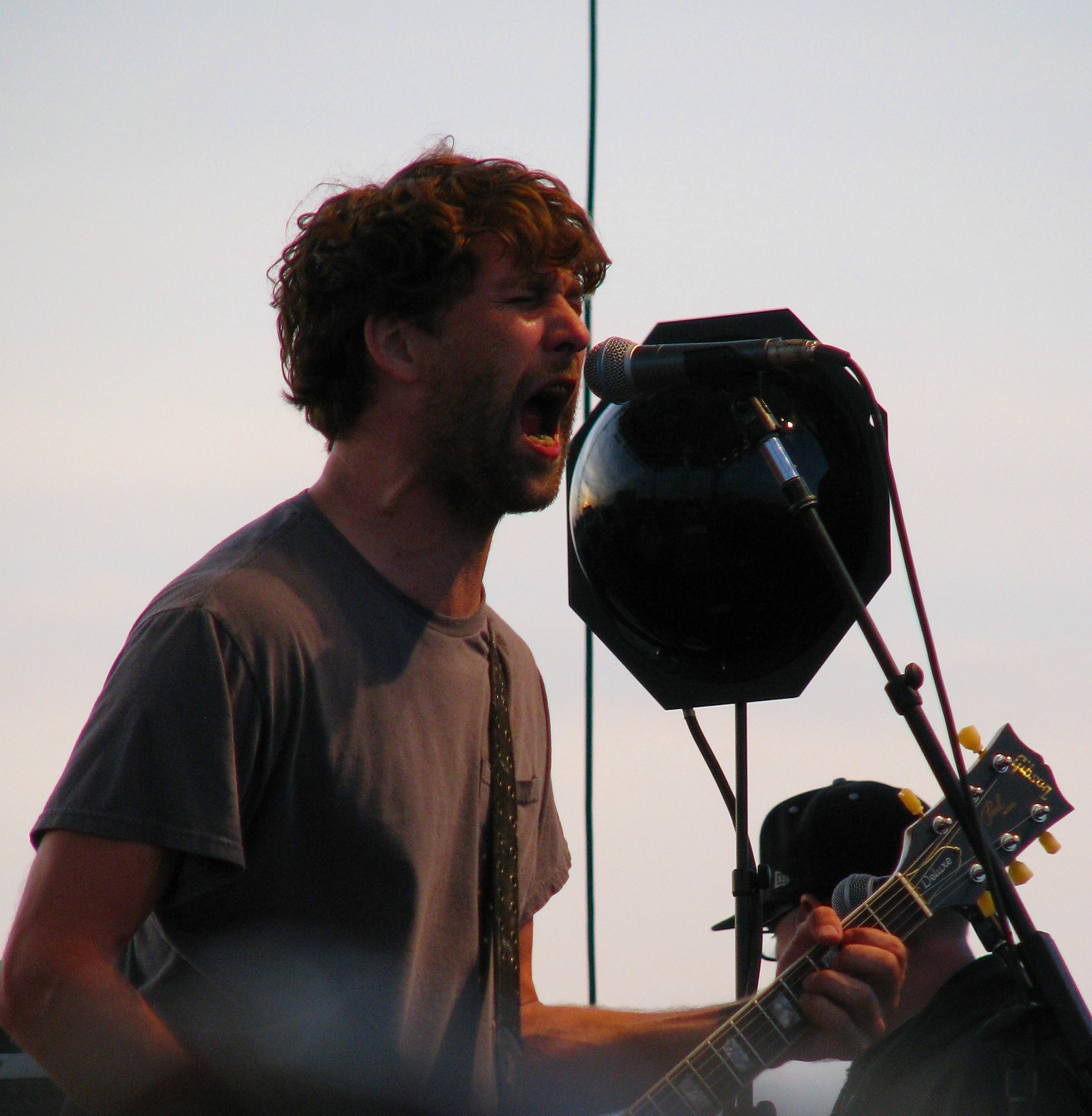
Wollard on The Stone Pony's Summer Stage in Asbury Park, NJ, June 22, 2013.

Less than two years after announcing their hiatus, the band announced that they would be reuniting for a handful of shows in 2008 to commemorate the release of their B-sides compilation record Till The Wheels Fall Off. The band continued to be semi-active, sporadically performing and touring over the next few years.

In 2011, the band announced that, after releasing a 7-inch single to support their European tour with Make Do and Mend, they would be releasing a new LP of original material through Rise Records. Hot Water Music released the album, Exister, in 2012.

After the release of their 2017 record Light It Up, Wollard announced that he was taking a break from the band to focus on his health. The band continued to play previously booked shows with The Flatliners' Chris Cresswell and Chris DeMakes of Less Than Jake filling in for Wollard at several dates. Cresswell also filled in for Wollard for the band's 25th anniversary tour in 2019. While Wollard is not currently performing live with the band, he is still involved in their studio endeavors, playing and singing on their 2019 Shake Up The Shadows EP, with Cresswell joining the recording on backing vocals. In 2021, the band signed with Equal Vision Records for their ninth LP Feel The Void, the band's first album featuring Cresswell as a permanent member, with Cresswell performing lead vocals on the track "Turn the Dial." In May 2024, their tenth album VOWS is released once again through Equal Vision Records.

== Other projects ==
Prior to founding Hot Water Music, the band's members played in several other groups, including Yellow Section (Ragan), Burial (Rebelo), Kelly Green (Black and Rebelo), Thread (Black and Wollard), and Fossil (Ragan and Rebelo). Between 1996 and 1998 Wollard and Rebelo, along with Jack Bailey and Heather Ann Parker, formed The Blacktop Cadence and released their album Chemistry for Changing Times in 1997. From 1998 through 1999, Ragan and Wollard joined Samantha Jones for the acoustic side-project Rumbleseat, which released four 7-inch singles and contributed several songs to compilations, later releasing an eponymous compilation in 2005 after their breakup.

Following Hot Water Music's 2005 hiatus announcement, Chuck Ragan began a solo career, releasing several records, as well as various collaborative efforts with other artists, including a collaborative live acoustic project called The Revival Tour, featuring several punk rock, bluegrass, and alt-country performers with Ragan's goal of "sharing music together" and "bringing it to people in an extremely honest and grassroots fashion." During this hiatus, Black, Rebelo, and Wollard formed The Draft, which released an LP and two EPs before disbanding, returning for a reunion tour in 2013. Wollard's first solo effort, Chris Wollard and the Ship Thieves was released in 2009. Jason Black joined Senses Fail in 2008, playing on their records Life Is Not A Waiting Room and The Fire before departing in 2012. Rebelo joined Against Me! in 2009, playing on their 2010 LP White Crosses, leaving the band that same year. Rebelo has been a member of The Bouncing Souls since 2013, playing on their 2016 record Simplicity. Chris Cresswell has been the lead vocalist/guitarist for Canadian punk rock group The Flatliners since its inception in 2002.

== Musical style and influences ==
Critics have categorized Hot Water Music's music as post-hardcore and emo.

They have cited influences including Leatherface, Fugazi, Fuel, Doughboys, Pegboy Rites of Spring, Embrace, Dag Nasty, Swiz, Articles of Faith, Jawbreaker, Jawbox, Hüsker Dü, Inquisition and Bruce Springsteen.

They have been cited as an influence by Dave Hause, the Gaslight Anthem, Against Me!, La Dispute, Make Do and Mend, Title Fight, Balance and Composure, Superheaven, Transit, Such Gold, Gnarwolves, Avenged Sevenfold, Atreyu, Grade, Alexisonfire, A Static Lullaby, the Used, Senses Fail, My Chemical Romance and Taking Back Sunday. They influenced many of the bands in the mainstream breakthrough of emo in the 2000s.

== Members ==
=== Current members ===
- Chuck Ragan – guitars, vocals (1994–1998, 1998–2006, 2008–present)
- Chris Wollard – guitars, vocals (1994–1998, 1998–2006, 2008–present)
- Jason Black – bass (1994–1998, 1998–2006, 2008–present)
- George Rebelo – drums (1994–1998, 1998–2006, 2008–present)
- Chris Cresswell – guitars, vocals (2017–present)

== Discography ==
=== Studio albums ===
- Fuel for the Hate Game (1997)
- Forever and Counting (1997)
- No Division (1999)
- A Flight and a Crash (2001)
- Caution (2002)
- The New What Next (2004)
- Exister (2012)
- Light It Up (2017)
- Feel the Void (2022)
- Vows (2024)

=== Compilations ===
- Finding the Rhythms (1997)
- Never Ender (2001)
- Till the Wheels Fall Off (2008)
- 20th Anniversary Collection (2015)
- Keep It Together (2017)

=== Live albums ===
- Live at the Hardback (1999)
- Live in Chicago (2013)

=== EPs and splits ===
- Push for Coin (Self-released on tape 1995, CD released on Happy Days Records 1995)
- Eating the Filler 7-inch (Toybox Records, Kung Fu Zombie 1995)
- Split with Swivel Stick 7-inch (Tuesday Morning Records 1995)
- Split with Tomorrow 11" (No Idea Records 1997)
- You Can Take the Boy Out of Bradenton (Schematics Records 1996)
- Alachua 7-inch - Allied Recordings (Self-released 1997, No Idea Records re-issue (1999)
- Split with Clairmel 8.5" / CD (No Idea Records 1998)
- F State Revisited 7-inch (Split with Screaming Fat Rat) (Snuffy Smile (1998)
- Split with Six Going On Seven 7-inch (Some Records 1998)
- Split with Rydell 7-inch (Scene Police / Ignition 1998)
- 403 Chaos Comp: Florida Fucking Hardcore (Comp) (1998)
- Moments Pass 7-inch (No Idea Records 1999)
- Where We Belong 7-inch (No Idea Records 1999)
- Moonpies for Misfits CD (No Idea Records 1999)
- BYO Split Series, Vol. 1 LP/CD (Split with Leatherface) (Better Youth Organization 1999)
- Read Army Faction 7-inch (Split with Avail, Discount, The Weakerthans) (No Idea Records, AK Press 2000)
- Split with Alkaline Trio CD/Picture Disc (Jade Tree Records, No Idea Records 2002)
- Colors, Words, And Dreams 7-inch (Split with The Casket Lottery) (Second Nature Recordings 2002)
- Split with Muff Potter 7-inch (Green Hell Label 2003)
- Live in Chicago No. 1 7-inch (No Idea Records 2010) Blue vinyl. Limited to 1000. Released for Record Store Day 2010
- Live in Chicago No. 2 7-inch (No Idea Records 2010) Red vinyl. Limited to 1000.
- Live in Chicago No. 3 7-inch (No Idea Records 2010) Yellow vinyl. Limited to 1000.
- Live in Chicago No. 4 7-inch (No Idea Records 2010) Green vinyl. Limited to 1000.
- Split with The Bouncing Souls 7-inch (Chunksaah Records 2011)
- Live in Chicago No. 5 7-inch (No Idea Records 2011) Purple vinyl. Limited to 1000.
- Live in Chicago No. 6 6" (No Idea Records 2011) White vinyl. Limited to 1000.
- The Fire, The Steel, The Tread/Adds Up to Nothing 7-inch (2011)
- Drag My Body 7-inch (Uncle M 2012) Picture Disc. Limited to 400 hand-numbered copies.
- Shake Up The Shadows (Epitaph Records 2019)
- Split (Split with Quicksand) LP/Digital (Equal Vision Records, 2025)

=== Music videos ===
- "Paper Thin" (2001)
- "Remedy" (2002)
- "State of Grace" (2012)
- "Drag My Body" (2013)
- "Never Going Back" (2017)
- "Vultures" (2017)
- "Killing Time" (2022)
- "Collect Your Things and Run" (2022)
- "Keepers of the Faith" [Terror cover] (2022)
- "Habitual" (2022)
- “Turn the Dial” (2022)
- “Drawn” (2023)
- "Menace" (2024)
- "Remnants" (2024)
- "After the Impossible" (2024)
