= Armchair Martian =

American punk and alt-country band

Armchair Martian, formed in 1993, is an American trio based out of Fort Collins, Colorado. They are a punk and alt-country band influenced by Descendents, Hüsker Dü, and Uncle Tupelo. They have put out numerous recordings through four record labels, the latest being Suburban Home which released the Good Guys, Bad Band album (a compilation of out of print material) in 2007 and re-issued their Who Wants to Play Bass? LP. Singer Jon Snodgrass later moved on to form Drag the River.

The band has formed a close friendship with punk rock bands Lagwagon and Bad Astronaut, particularly main songwriter and vocalist of both groups Joey Cape. Both Cape and Snodgrass have been known to frequently cover each other's songs on numerous releases, including a split EP with Bad Astronaut in 2001 titled War of the Worlds. The two also collaborated on two albums from the band Scorpios, also featuring Tony Sly, Brian Wahlstrom, and Chris Cresswell.

== Band members ==
- Guitar/vocals – Jon Snodgrass
- Drums – Paul Rucker
- Bass – Miguel Barron

Previous members

- Steve Garcia
- Chad Rex
- Chad Price

== Discography ==
- "Armchair Martian" 7" (1995) (Cargo/Headhunter Records)
- Xenophobe: A Car (1996) (Cargo/Headhunter Records)
- Armchair Martian (1997) (Cargo/Headhunter Records)
- "Monsters Always Scream" 10" (1997) (My Records)
- Hang On Ted (1999) (Cargo/Headhunter Records)
- Monsters Always Scream (2001) (My Records)
- War of the Worlds Split CD with Bad Astronaut (2001) (Owned & Operated)
- Who Wants to Play Bass? (2007) (Suburban Home/Mars Motors)
- Good Guys, Bad Band (2007) (Suburban Home/Mars Motors)
