= Drag the River (Colorado band) =

American alternative country band

- Origin: Colorado, U.S.
- Genres: Alternative country, Southern rock
- Years active: 1996–2007, 2008–present
- Labels: Upland; Suburban Home; Third World Industries; Wallride; De Rok
- Members: Jon Snodgrass; J.J. Nobody; Chad Price; Chris Pierce
- Past members: Zach Boddicker (1999–2004, 2008–2010); Dave Barker (2005–2007); Casey Prestwood (2005–2006); Paul Rucker (1996–2005); Karl Alvarez (1997–2002); Chad Rex
- Website: dragtheriver.com

Drag the River is an American alternative country band from Colorado.

== History ==
Drag the River formed in 1996 when Chad Price of All began working with Jon Snodgrass of Armchair Martian, Paul Rucker and J.J. Nobody of the Nobodys. They released Hobo's Demos in 2000. Steel guitarist Zach Boddicker joined the band in 2001 around the time they were touring the US West coast. They then released Closed through Upland Records in early 2002; that same year, the live album Live at the Starlight was released through Mars Motors Records. Outtakes from Hobo's Demos were released under the name Chicken Demos in May 2004. Boddicker left he band shortly afterwards to return to education. Chad Rex filled his role occasionally, until Casey Prestwood of Hot Rod Circuit joined as a full-time member. In November and December 2004, the band went on an East Coast tour with the Enablers. Rucker left towards the end of 2005, being replaced by former Pinhead Circus member Dave Barker. The band went on a Midwestern tour until the end of the year, and played a handful of shows in February 2006.

On March 8, 2006, it was announced that Drag the River had signed to Suburban Home Records. They toured across the US in May 2006 with Koufax, Cordero, and Tim Barry of Avail. It's Crazy was released on June 6, 2006. In August and September 2006, they toured across the US with I Can Lick Any Sonofabitch in the House, and then appeared at The Fest and FunFunFun Fest. From November 2006, Suburban Home Records began reissuing the band's back catalogue. They went on a US tour for the rest of the year with Lucero. They opened 2007 supporting Rocky Votolato. In February 2007, they went on a West Coast tour with Tim Barry of Avail, and then supported Owen on his headlining US tour in March and April 2007. In the midst of the tour, Snodgrass left; he later clarified he only left the tour, but not the band.

The band announced they were breaking up in May 2007; Suburban Home released a split between the band and Dents in August 2007. They reunited for a series of shows in January 2008, which were supported by Scott Reynolds and the Steaming Beast. It was expanded to a full tour, with Slorder, Chad Rex, and Cory Branan appearing on select dates. Coinciding with this was the release of You Can't Live This Way on January 22, 2008. They then appeared at The Fest in Florida in October 2008. Around this time, a music video was released for "Rangement". In August 2009, Live at the Starlight was released as a free download to combat people selling copies of it at high prices online. They then appeared at The Fest in October 2009; they toured Europe with Chris Wollard and the Ship Thieves to close out the year. In February 2010, the band went on a short West Coast tour with Cheap Girls. They continue to play shows as a duo (Price & Snodgrass) and often as a full band.

== Discography ==
Studio albums

- Hobo's Demos (2000)
- Closed (2002)
- Chicken Demos (2004)
- It's Crazy (2006)
- Gabba Gabba Hey Buddies...LP (2007)
- You Can't Live This Way (2008)
- 2010 Demons (2010)
- Drag The River (2013)

Compilation albums

- Bad At Breaking Up (2009)
- Primer (mix tape CD) (2009)

Live albums

- Live at The Starlight (2002)
- At the Green Door LP (2003)

7"s, EPs and splits

- Hey Buddies... (2004)
- ...Has A Way with Women 7 inch (2006)
- A Shame – Beautiful and Damned (Space mix) 7 inch (2006)
- Found All The Parts (Split with the Dents) (2007)
- can't Leave These Strays 7 inch (2009)
- Garage Rock 7 inch (2009)
- Under the Influence Vol 5 7 inch (2009)
- Split 7inch w/ Chris Wollard & the Ship Thieves (2009)
- Hometown Caravan Fishing Club 7 inch (2013)
- Losers/Marooned 7 inch (2013)
