= Tim Barry =

American musician

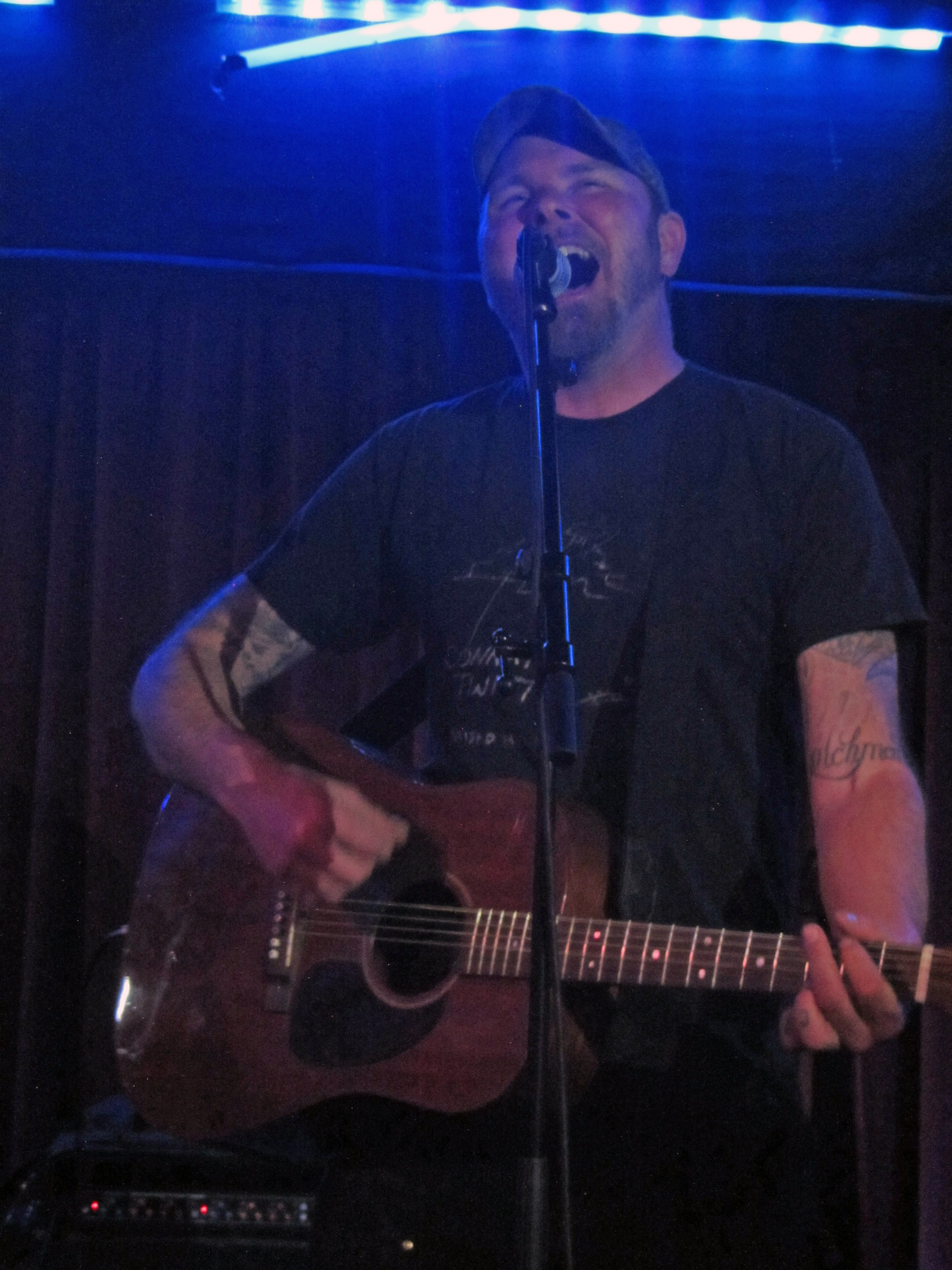
- Barry performing in 2015

Background information
- Origin: Richmond, Virginia, U.S.
- Genres: Folk punk, punk rock, melodic hardcore, folk
- Occupation(s): Singer, musician, songwriter
- Instrument(s): Vocals, guitar, bass
- Years active: 1990–present
- Labels: Chunksaah, Xtra Mile, Resist, Suburban Home
- Website: timbarryrva.com

Tim Barry is an American musician and the lead singer of the Richmond, Virginia-based punk rock band Avail. In addition to performing with Avail, he was the bass guitarist in the Richmond-based folk punk band (Young) Pioneers from 1994 to 1995. Barry has been performing folk music on his own since 2004.

== Discography ==
=== Albums ===
- Rivanna Junction (Chunksaah Records, 2006)
- Manchester (Chunksaah Records, 2008)
- 28th & Stonewall (Chunksaah Records, 2010)
- 40 Miler (Chunksaah Records, 2012)
- Laurel Street Demo & Live at Munford Elementary (Chunksaah Records, 2013)
- Raising Hell & Living Cheap, Live in Richmond (Chunksaah Records, 2014)
- Lost & Rootless (Chunksaah Records, 2014)
- High on 95 (Chunksaah Records, 2017)
- The Roads to Richmond (Chunksaah Records, 2019)
- Live 2018 (Chunksaah Records, 2020)
- Spring Hill (Chunksaah Records, 2022)

=== Splits and Collaborations ===
- Frank Turner / Tim Barry – Split EP (October 13, 2009)

=== DVDs ===
- Live (featuring Tim Barry and La Par Force) (2006)
- Live at the Grey Eagle (2010)
