= List of festivals in the United Kingdom =

This is a list of festivals in the United Kingdom.

== England ==
=== A–B ===
- Albion Fairs
- Aldeburgh Festival, Suffolk
- All Points East
- Appleby Jazz Festival
- Arundel Festival
- Bolton food festival
- Barnes Film Festival
- Bath Fringe Festival
- Bath International Music Festival
- Bath Literature Festival
- Beached Festival in Scarborough
- Bedford Fringe Festival - 2023 will be 16th year
- Bedford River Festival
- Beverley Folk Festival
- Big Chill Festival in Eastnor
- Bingley Music Live
- Birmingham: ArtsFest
- Birmingham Book Festival
- Birmingham Comedy Festival
- Birmingham Design Festival
- Birmingham Weekender
- Birmingham International Carnival
- Birmingham International Dance Festival (BIDF)
- Birmingham Mela,
- Birmingham: Moseley Folk and Arts Festival
- Birmingham: Mostly Jazz Funk & Soul Festival
- Blackpool Illuminations
- Blackpool Festival of Light
- Blackpool Rebellion Festival
- Blissfields, near Winchester
- Bloodstock Open Air
- Boishakhi Mela festival
- Boundary Festival
- Bradford Literature Festival
- Bradford Mela Festival
- Bridgnorth Folk Festival, Shropshire
- Bridgwater: Guy Fawkes Carnival
- Brighton Festival
- Brighton Festival Fringe
- Bristol: Ashton Court festival
- Bristol International Balloon Fiesta
- Bristol Harbour festival
- Bristol: Upfest
- Bromyard Folk Festival
- Bulldog Bash Motorcycle Festival
- BunkFest
- Burtfest, Burton Upon Trent
- Bury Festival, Bury St Edmunds, Suffolk
- Buxton Festival, Buxton, Derbyshire

=== C–E ===
- Cambridge Folk Festival
- CarFest
- Cary Comes Home Festival
- Castlemorton Common Festival
- Cheltenham: Cheltenham Festivals:
  - Cheltenham Cricket Festival
  - Cheltenham Jazz Festival
  - Cheltenham Literature Festival
  - Cheltenham Music Festival
  - Cheltenham Science Festival
- Chicken Stock Festival, small arts festival near Malvern, Worcestershire
- Clarence Park Festival
- Clitheroe Food Festival, Lancashire's premier food and drink festival, Clitheroe, Lancashire
- Coventry: Godiva, Jazz, Town & Country, Kite, Royal Show
- Creamfields dance music festival
- Cropredy Festival
- Cypriot Film Festival UK
- Damnation Festival (metal music)
- Deepdale Festival, Deepdale Backpackers & Camping, Burnham Deepdale, Norfolk
- Deepdale Hygge, Deepdale Backpackers & Camping, Burnham Deepdale, Norfolk
- Didsbury Arts Festival
- Donington Monsters of Rock
- Dover Carnival, Dover, England
- Download Festival, annual rock festival held at Donington Park motorsport circuit since 2003
- Durham Miners' Gala
- East London LGBTQ+ Film Festival
- Ely Arts Festival
- Endless Festival
- Esedhvos Kernow, Cornwall
- Evolution Festival

=== F–J ===
- Forest Live
- Format International Photography Festival
- Hull Freedom Festival*Frome Festival, Somerset
- FuseLeeds
- FladFest, Fladbury
- Give It A Name
- Glastonbury Festival
- Glowflare Horror Film Festival
- Glowflare Short Film Festival
- Glyndebourne Opera Festival
- Godiva Festival
- Golowan Festival
- Great British Rhythm and Blues Festival, Colne, Lancashire
- Greenbelt festival
- Green Man Festival
- Greenwich+Docklands International Festival
- Guilfest
- Holi
- H2OFest
- Harrogate: Harrogate International Festivals, Great Yorkshire Show
- Hemsby Festival
- Henley Festival of Music and the Arts
- HowTheLightGetsIn Festival
- Huddersfield: Caribbean Carnival, Huddersfield Contemporary Music Festival, Asian Mela
- Hull Freedom Festival
- Ilkley Literature Festival
- Infest, University of Bradford (electronic and dance festival)*International Festival of the Sea
- International Guitar Festival of Great Britain, Wirral
- International Organ Festival at St Albans
- Isle of Wight Festival 1968, 1969 and 1970

=== K–M ===
- Keighley: Keighley Festival
- Kendal Mountain Film Festival
- Keswick Mountain Festival
- Knebworth concerts (occasional)
- Land of Kings, London Borough of Hackney
- The Lakes International Comic Art Festival, Kendal, Cumbria
- Latitude Festival, Suffolk
- Ledbury Poetry Festival, Herefordshire
- LeeFest, Bromley
- Leeds Festival (1999–present, Bramham Park, Wetherby)
- Leeds International Festival of Ideas
- Leeds International Film Festival
- Leicester: Leicester Comedy Festival, Leicester Caribbean Carnival
- Letchworth Garden City: Rap-Aid Music Festival
- Lichfield Festival
- Liverpool: Liverpool Arab Arts Festival, Liverpool Biennial, Liverpool Garden Festival (1984), Look Photo Biennial
- London: Carnival de Cuba; Carnaval Del Pueblo, Europe's biggest Latin American festival; City of London Festival; Covent Garden Festival; Fitzrovia Arts Festival, Kensington Dollshouse Festival; Festival of Britain (1951); Greenwich+Docklands International Festival; Greenwich Film Festival; Lesbian and Gay Film Festival; Notting Hill Carnival; Oktoberfest, the German cultural festival held in Richmond-upon-Thames; Portobello Film Festival; Spitalfields Festival
- London History Festival
- Lost Village Festival
- Love Supreme Jazz Festival
- Ludlow Festival, Shropshire
- Lumiere
- Luton Carnival
- Lyme Regis Fossil Festival
- Lytham Festival, Lytham St Anne's, Lancashire
- Lytham International Film Festival, Lytham St Anne's, Lancashire
- Manchester Animation Festival
- Manchester Day
- Manchester International Festival
- Manchester Jazz Festival
- Manchester Literature Festival
- Middlesbrough Music Live

=== N–R ===
- Newcastle upon Tyne: The Hoppings
- Newlyn Fish Festival
- Norfolk and Norwich Festival
- Nouka Baich
- O2 Wireless Festival (2006 and 2007 – Harewood House, Harewood, near Wetherby)
- Out There Festival
- Party in the Park (Temple Newsam, Colton)
- Peak Literary Festival, Peak District National Park
- Pershore Plum Festival, Pershore, Worcestershire
- Peterborough Festival
- Parklife Weekender, Heaton Park
- Reading: .Reading Festival, WOMAD
- Refract Festival
- RhythmTree World Music & Didgeridoo Festival, Calbourne Water Mill, Calbourne, Isle of Wight
- Romford Film Festival
- Romford Horror Film Festival
- Ross on Wye International Festival

=== S–T ===
- Salisbury International Arts Festival
- Sathiyanathan Natarajan
- Scarborough Literature Festival
- Shakespeare Schools Festival
- Sheffield International Documentary Festival
- Shifnal Festival
- Sidmouth Folk Festival
- Slam Dunk Festival (2006 – Millennium Square, 2007–present – Leeds University Union)
- Slapstick Festival
- Soundwave Festival
- St Barnabas Community Fete, Bow, London
- Stockton Riverside Festival
- Stonehenge Free Festival
- StoomFest Rock Music Festival - Stoner, Doom, and Psych Rock Fest, London
- Strawberry Fair, Cambridge
- Swan Upping
- Swaledale Festival
- Tankfest
- Thames Festival
- Thought Bubble Festival
- Three Choirs Festival
- The Tolpuddle Martyrs festival
- The Great Exhibition Road Festival
- Towersey Village Festival
- Tramlines Festival
- Transform Festival
- Truck Festival

=== V–Z ===
- V Festival
- Vegfest (UK)
- Warrington Arts Festival
- Warwick Folk Festival
- Weekend at the Asylum
- West Country: West Country Carnival circuit
- Weyfest
- Whitby Goth Weekend
- Wimborne Folk Festival
- Wirral International Film Festival
- Womad
- Women in Tune
- Wonderfields, Devon
- Worcestershire Literary Festival
- Young Carer's Festival, Curdridge, Southampton
- Y Not Festival

== Scotland ==
- Aberdeen: Aberdeen International Youth Festival, The World Festival of Youth Arts; Word; Wordfringe; Dance Live; Sound
- Dumfries and Galloway: Gaelfest
- Dundee: Dundee Flower and Food Festival, Dundee Guitar Festival, Dundee Blues Bonanza, Dundee International Book Prize
- Edinburgh: Edinburgh Festival, Edinburgh International Festival, Edinburgh International Film Festival, Edinburgh Art Festival, Edinburgh International Television Festival, Edinburgh International Science Festival, Edinburgh Festival Fringe, Edinburgh International Book Festival, Edinburgh Military Tattoo, International Festivals of the Sea
- Glamis, by Forfar: Scotland's Countryside Festival
- Glasgow: Glasgow Jazz Festival; Celtic Connections; MovieMinds, an international online film festival TRNSMT
- Hebridean Celtic Festival
- Inverary: Connect Festival
- Inverness: Highland Festival
- Orkney: St Magnus Festival
- Perth & Kinross: Mugstock Festival
- Shakespeare Schools Festival, various locations
- Shetland: Up Helly-Aa
- Ullapool: Loopallu Festival
- Various sites: T in the Park

== Wales ==
- Abergavenny Food Festival
- Brecon Jazz Festival
- Cardiff Festival
- Cardiff International Film Festival Wales
- Green Man Festival
- Hay Festival of Literature & Arts
- HowTheLightGetsIn Festival, Hay-on-Wye
- Llangollen International Eisteddfod
- National Eisteddfod of Wales
- Pontardawe Festival
- Shakespeare Schools Festival, various locations
- Small Nations Festival
- Urdd National Eisteddfod

== Northern Ireland ==
- Belfast Festival at Queens
- Belfast Film Festival
- Belfast International Arts Festival
- Belfast International Tattoo
- Eastside Arts Festival
- Orangefest
- The Eleventh Night
- The Twelfth
- Shakespeare Schools Festival, Belfast and Derry

== Themes ==
- Film: Birmingham, Cardiff, Edinburgh, Greenwich, Lesbian and Gay, Portobello, Sheffield
- Folk: Bridgnorth, Bromyard, Cambridge, Cropredy, Fleetwood, Sidmouth, Towersey, Warwick, Wimborne
- Literature: Bath, Birmingham, Cheltenham, Hay, Ilkley, Worcestershire Literary Festival, Wordfringe
- Music:
  - Jazz: Bath, Birmingham, Burnham Deepdale, Coventry, Glasgow, Clitheroe
- Other: Bristol Harbour Festival (maritime), HowTheLightGetsIn (philosophy and music)
- Dance & Arts: Lost Village Festival

== See also ==
- List of music festivals in the United Kingdom
- List of festivals
- Literary festival#Europe
- Free festival
