= Beaching =

Beaching or Beached may refer to:

== Common uses ==
- Beaching (nautical), when a ship is deliberately or inadvertently "run aground"
- Mass stranding, mass beaching of the sea animals
- Cetacean stranding, when a large sea mammal is beached on land

== Arts, entertainment, and media ==
- Beached Festival, a free annual music festival held on the south bay in Scarborough, England
- "Beachin'", a song by Jake Owen

== See also ==
- Beeching, similar English surname
