= Victor Farrar =

British architect (1930–2007)

Victor Farrar RIBA PPFAS FRSA
- Born: 1930; Bedford, England
- Died: 23 August 2007 (aged 76–77); Wilden, Bedfordshire, England
- Occupation: Architect

Victor John Frederick Farrar RIBA PPFAS FRSA (1930 – 23 August 2007), also known as V.J.F. Farrar, was an architect known for his restoration work at a time when respect for architectural heritage was at a low ebb. His obituary in The Guardian stated that ‘he put a training in classical design techniques to good use in his speciality of building restoration’. Farrar’s obituary in his old school magazine reflected that, at the time, ‘it was rare to find a professional willing to take a public stand against the post war establishment, which in Bedford, as in many towns, saw little merit in the preservation of what we now call heritage’.

Farrar was a President of the Faculty of Architects and Surveyors and a member of the Architects’ Benevolent Society. He was elected to the Great Barford parish council in 1959 which he served for 21 years and was, towards the end of his tenure, its Chairman. He was Honorary Treasurer of the Bedfordshire Parish and Town Council Committee, Chairman of the Bedford Society, a member of the Great Ouse Restoration Society and an organiser of the Bedford River Festival.

== Life ==
Victor John Frederick Farrar was born in Bedford, England in 1930. He was educated at Bedford Modern School between 1940 and 1946 where he excelled at cross country running for which he would later represent Bedfordshire. Farrar’s success at the sport was such that he became an Honorary Life Member of the English Cross Country Union.

Farrar joined the Royal Engineers for National Service after which he took up a course in architecture at the Rochester Technical College and subsequently worked with Bedfordshire County Council. In 1950, Farrar joined the architectural practice of Sir Albert Richardson where the experience gave him great insight into classical design and proved the foundation of his subsequent work in restoration. Like Richardson, he was adept at fast sketches which he would later use for Christmas cards.

In 1962, Farrar set up the Victor Farrar partnership and was proactive in the dioceses of Peterborough and St Albans for church restoration. He subsequently wrote a report for the Bedford Society regarding the plight of four Bedford churches that had become redundant: St Mary’s, St Cuthbert’s, Holy Trinity and St Leonard. St Cuthbert’s was rescued by the Harpur Trust and subsequently given to the Polish community in Bedford. The church of St Leonard was the only one of the four to be demolished.

In 1978, Farrar was appointed to restore the nave and chancel of St Paul's Church, Bedford. He also restored the west gallery at the church, and its spire. St Paul's has been described as being of cathedral proportions.

Farrar was elected to the Great Barford parish council in 1959 which he served for 21 years and was, towards the end of his tenure, its Chairman. He was Honorary Treasurer of the Bedfordshire Parish and Town Council Committee, a President of the Faculty of Architects and Surveyors, a member of the Architects’ Benevolent Society, Chairman of the Bedford Society, a member of the Great Ouse Restoration Society and an organiser of the Bedford River Festival.

As consultant architect for the Bedford Society and at his own expense, Farrar funded a restoration package for the Priory Terrace in Bedford, 20-48 Bromham Road, a regency style building that was scheduled for demolition in 1970. He was able to secure a developer, Kingsbury Securities, to turn the property into offices and flats and the building is now one of Bedford’s landmarks for which Farrar was awarded the Sheffield Rose Bowl.

Farrar died on 23 August 2007 at Wilden, Bedfordshire, England. His obituary in The Guardian stated that ‘he put a training in classical design techniques to good use in his speciality of building restoration’. Farrar’s obituary in his old school magazine reflected that at the time ‘it was rare to find a professional willing to take a public stand against the post war establishment, which in Bedford, as in many towns, saw little merit in the preservation of what we now call heritage’.

Farrar was survived by his wife, Denise, and his children, Roxana and Nicholas.

== Publication ==
- Bedford 50 years ago. The architecture of a County Town, by Victor J F Farrar. Published 2007

== Gallery ==
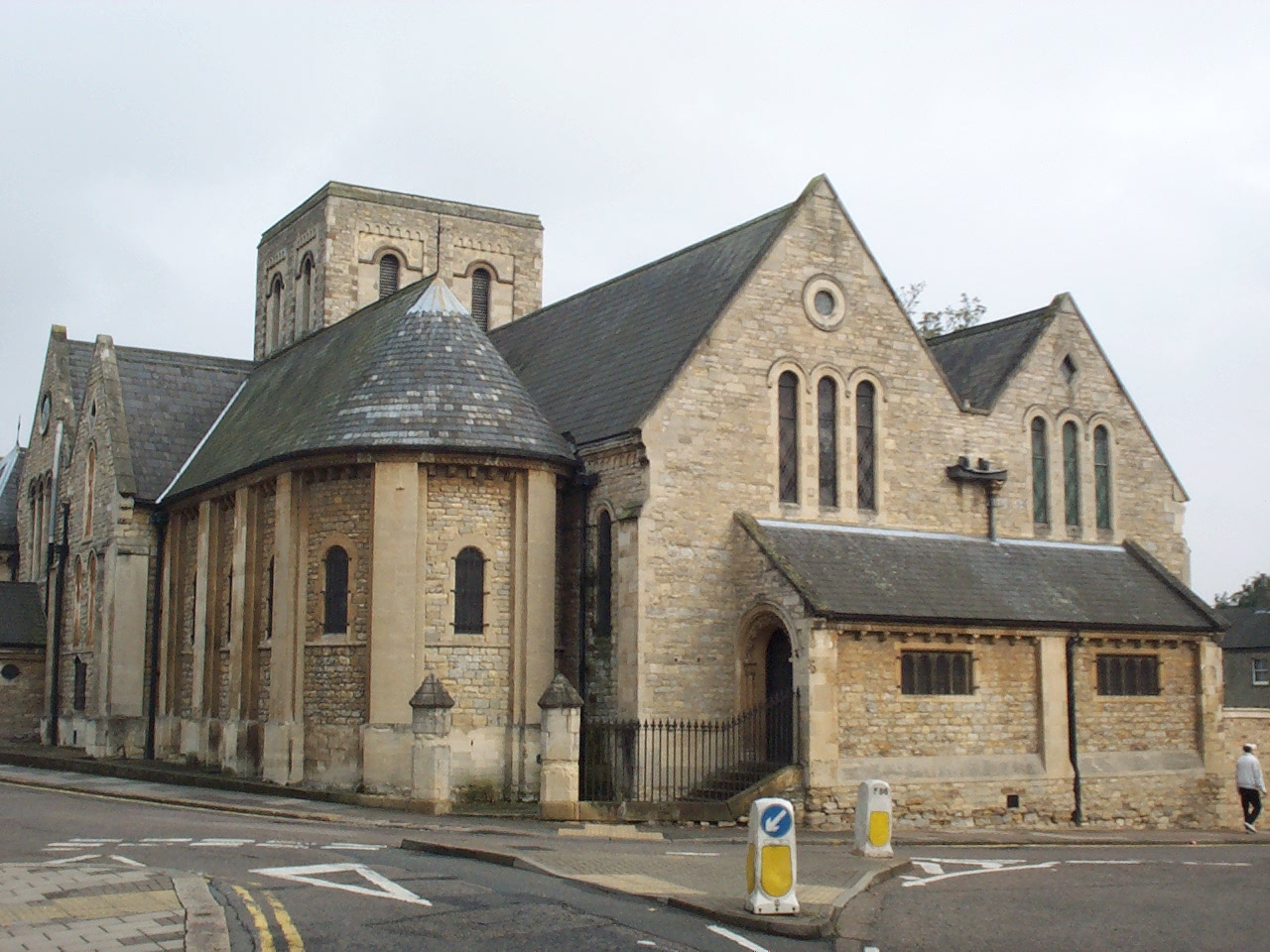
St Cuthbert’s in Bedford, which Farrar helped save from demolition

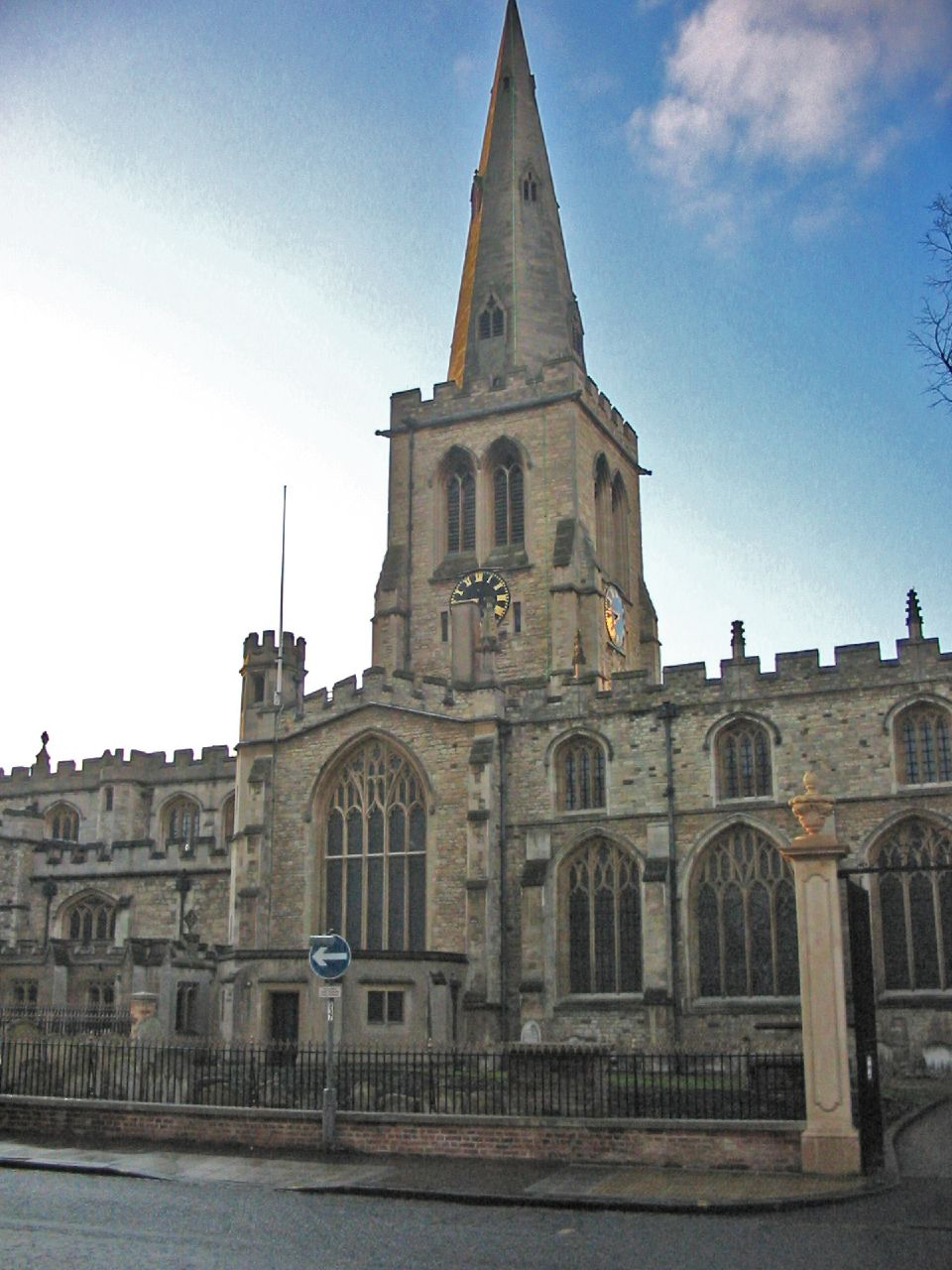
St Paul’s Church, Bedford, where Farrar restored the nave and chancel

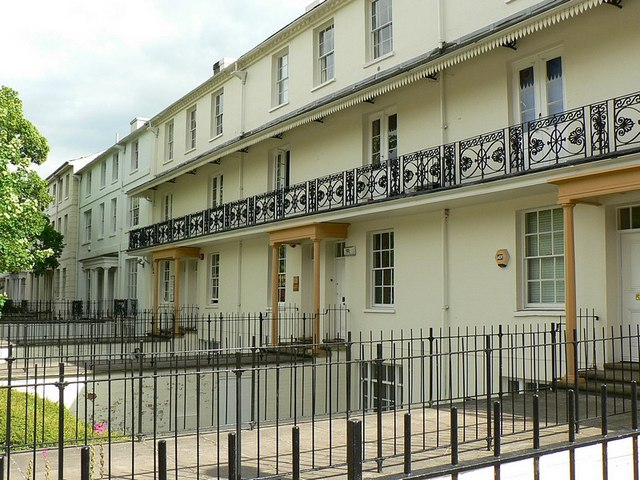
Priory Terrace, Bedford, which Farrar saved from demolition

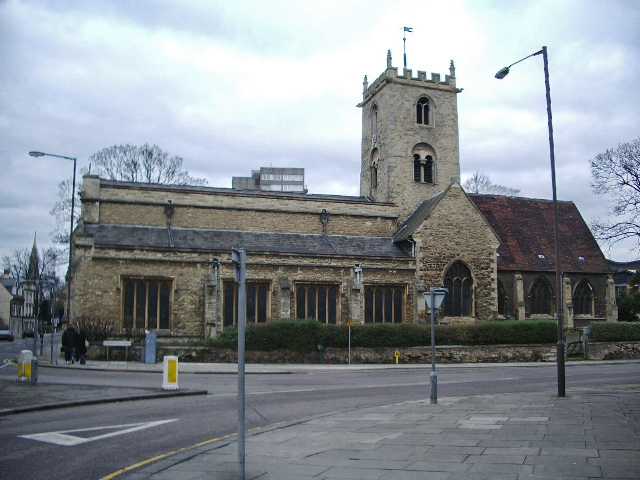
St Mary's Church, Bedford, which Farrar saved from demolition

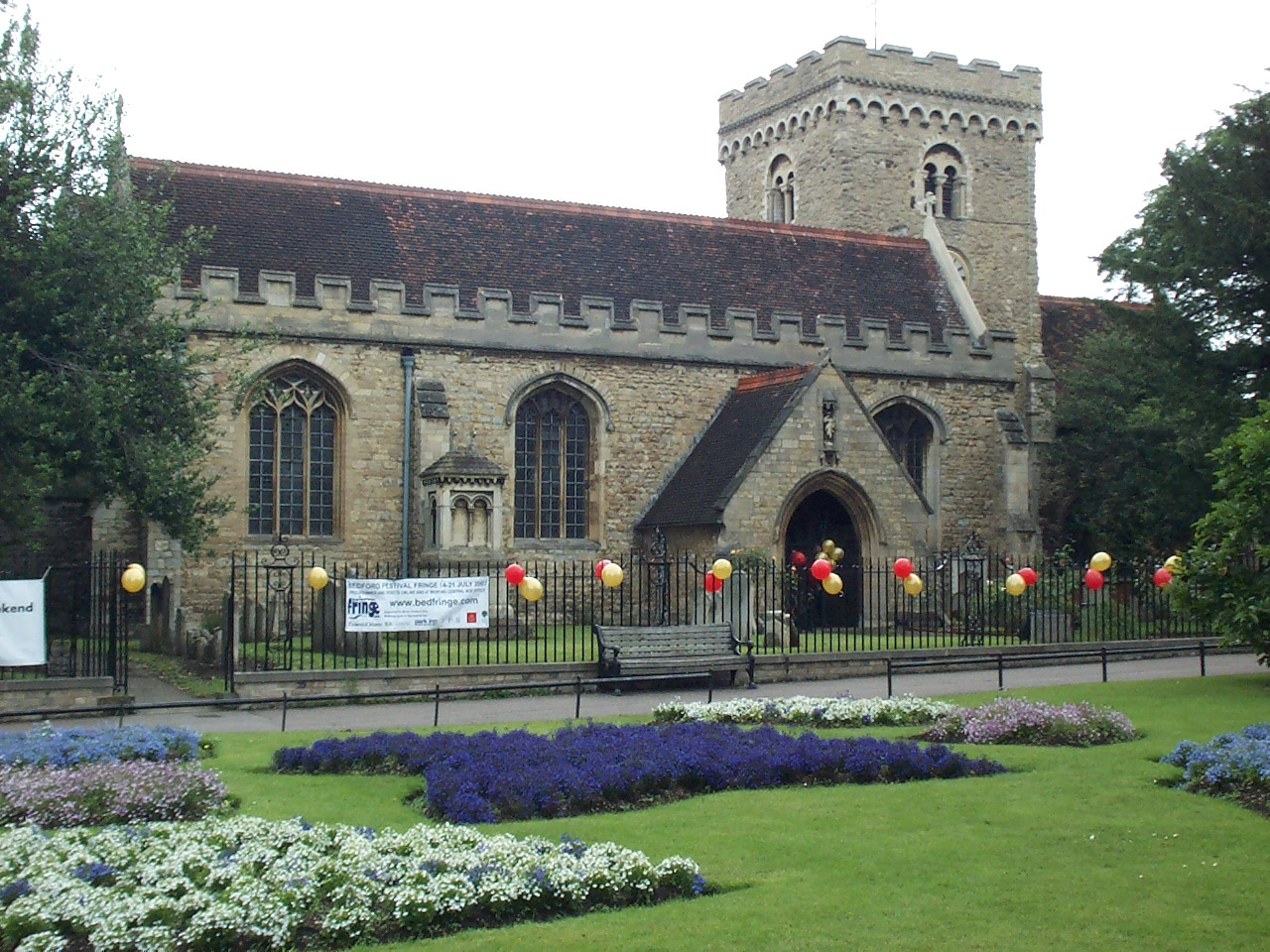
St Peter's Church, Bedford, where Farrar carried out inspection reports

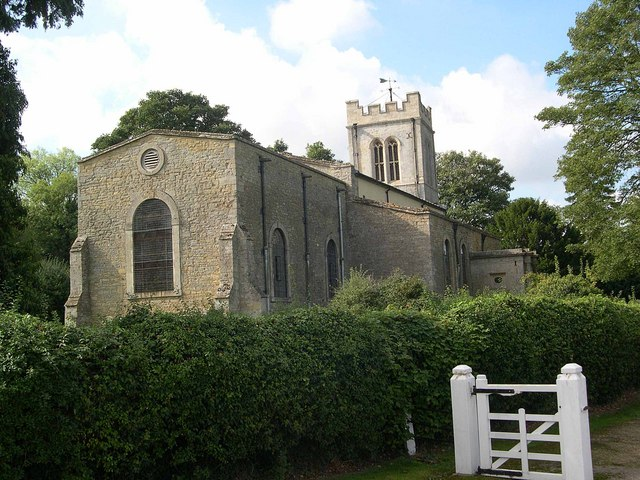
Church of St Mary Magdalene, Melchbourne, where Farrar carried out restoration work
