= ARC Theatre & Arts Centre, Stockton-on-Tees =

Entertainment venue in County Durham, England

ARC Stockton Arts Centre, Stockton-on-Tees
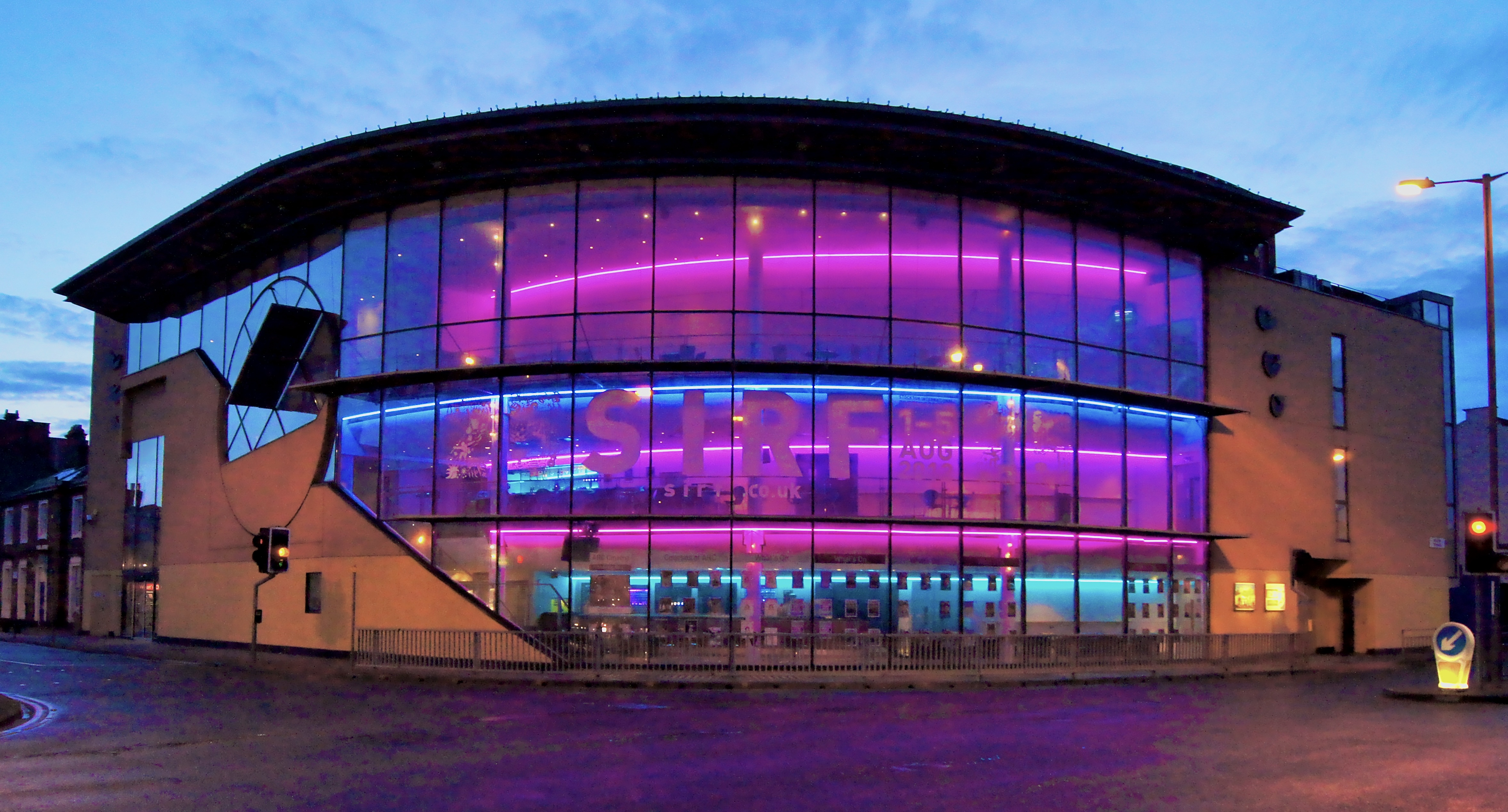
- Fill image
- Interactive map of ARC Stockton Arts Centre, Stockton-on-Tees
- Address: Dovecot Street, TS18 1LL; Stockton-on-Tees; United Kingdom
- Coordinates: 54.564403°N 1.315476°W
- Owner: Arts Council England/ Stockton Borough Council
- Capacity: theatre 246; cinema 127; studio theatre 99, The Point 550 (standing)
- Designation: theatre, Arts centre

Construction
- Opened: 1998
- Years active: 1998 – 2001, 2003 – present
- Architect: RHWL Artstream

ARC Stockton Arts Centre is a multi-purpose arts centre embracing cinema, theatre, dance and music. It has five floors offering four venues: two theatres, a mixed venue called The Point, and a cinema. It is run by an independent trust called Stockton Arts Centre Limited.

== Overview ==
The building is on the north east end of the Nelson Terrace and Dovecot Street crossing. ARC Theatre & Arts Centre comprises a multi-purpose arts centre which has four venues: a 246-seat theatre, a 99-seat studio theatre, a mixed venue called The Point (550 standing and 397 fully-seated), and the cinema (seating 127). It also has exhibition spaces, meeting rooms, a café and two bars. The full height glass façade shows the three-level foyer from the road.

== History ==
=== Predecessors ===
Building	Owner	Use	Duration
1	William Hope	Theatre	1905–1932
2	Chadwick, Watson and Company	Cinema (before 1948) • Theatre (from 1948)	1933–1955
2	Essoldo	Cinema	1955–1972
2	Classic	Cinema	1972–1995

=== Opening and reopening ===
The centre was built in 1997, at a cost of £6.85m, using funds from the National Lottery; it replaced existing arts facilities including the Dovecot Arts Centre and the Cannon cinema. It was designed by RHWL Arts Team, and won a Civic Trust Award in 2001. Richard Wilson designed the artwork 'Over Easy' which is integral to the building, consisting of a large circular section of wall which is motorised to rotate and provide a dynamic element to the building's design.

It opened in 1998, but despite early success in terms of activity and audiences, struggled financially and closed in November 2001 due to large deficit built up due to over spends in construction and delays with opening. With the support of Stockton-on-Tees Borough Council and Arts Council England, as well as many individuals, an independent trust was formed in 2002 named Stockton Arts Centre Ltd. and ARC was bought back from the administrators. It re-opened to the public in September 2003 and has gradually recovered from its initial organisational and financial problems.

=== Present activity ===
In June 2012 and September 2014, ARC hosted the television show Question Time, the BBC's flagship programme of topical debate. The venue is supported and funded through Arts Council England, Stockton Borough Council and the income it generates. ARC takes part in the Stockton International Riverside Festival and Christmas in Stockton. It also has links with Stockton Riverside College, Durham University, and The Northern School of Art to increase student usage.
