= Boyd and Wain =

English musical duo

- Origin: England
- Genres: Folk, Americana
- Years active: 2009–present
- Labels: Goldtop
- Members: Katy Boyd; Benny Wain

Boyd and Wain is an acoustic duo composed of American singer songwriter Katy Boyd and English violinist Benny Wain.

== History ==
=== Katy Boyd ===
Katy Boyd grew up in Menlo Park on Perry Lane After attending the University of California Santa Cruz she became a full-time songwriter. In the early 1980s, Boyd won what is now the West Coast Songwriters Association's annual song writing contest and moved to the UK. She married, remained in England and gave up performing. However, she began writing and performing again, finally securing a recording deal with Goldtop Recordings (Jungle Records).

=== Benny Wain ===
Benny Wain started his professional music career playing in the family band The Sidling Stompers out of Sydling St Nicholas in Dorset at the age of 12. The band, which included his younger sister, Nina Wain, had great success in Southern England, and was played on BBC Radio 2's "Folk on Two". They formed the folk rock band Jigsaw in the 1990s.

=== Beginnings ===
Benny Wain and Katy Boyd met playing in the function band Howling at the Moon. The duo formed in May 2009. In July 2009 they won the Trowbridge Village Pump Unsigned Act Competition. They have gone on to play major festivals in the UK, including Tolpuddle, the Belfast Nashville Songwriters Festival, Bath Party in the City, Wimborne Folk Festival and The Brighton Fringe. They have toured the US several times. The first album Ain't No Fairy Tale appeared on the Roots Music Report Folk Radio Chart in the summer of 2010, starting at No. 36.

== Discography ==
- Ain't No Fairy Tale, 2010
