= Be Quiet. Shout Loud! =

English disco-punk band

- Origin: Middlesbrough, England
- Genres: Indie rock, electro, dance-punk
- Years active: 2008–present
- Members: Jake Radio; Jamie Donnelly; Chris Burton; Paul Morton; Dave Owens
- Past members: Paul McCullagh; Michael Snowden

Be Quiet. Shout Loud! are a five-piece feel good disco-punk band formed in Teesside, England, in 2008 comprising Jake Radio (vocals), Dave Owens (bass), Chris Burton (keytar), Paul Morton (drums), and guitarist Jamie Donnelly who joined the group in 2017.

== History ==
=== Gigs ===
With hundreds of gigs under their belts, the band has supported such acts as Iglu & Hartly, Electric 6, The Chapman Family, One Night Only, Team Waterpolo, Kaizers Orchestra, Toyah, while playing at Middlesbrough Music Live, Beached Festival, Stockton Calling, Twisterella, Music Box, Last Train Home and Olgas Rock festivals.

=== Releases ===
To date the band have released numerous singles including debut "Disco Beat" in 2009, "Superheroes" and "(You're Not) Sitting in Tonight". In 2015 the band released The 2014 Years compilation of singles and in 2018, the Another Commotion EP. 2019 saw the release of the Fake Emergency EP.

=== David Wheater ===
In early 2008, a video appeared on YouTube of Middlesbrough F.C. defender David Wheater dancing to "You'll Never Know How to Dance (Unless You're Dancin' with Us)" which was later named as the number-three dancing-footballer video by The Daily Mirror.

== Band members ==
- Jake Radio: vocals/synth
- Jamie Donnelly: guitar
- Dave Owens: bass
- Chris Burton: keytar
- Paul Morton: drums
