= Beeching =

Beeching is an English surname. It is either a derivative of the old English bece, bæce "stream", hence "dweller by the stream" or of the old English bece "beech-tree" hence "dweller by the beech tree".

People called Beeching include:-

- Henry Beeching (1859–1919), British clergyman, author and poet
- Jack Beeching (John Charles Stuart Beeching) (1922–2001), British poet
- Richard Beeching (1913–1985), chairman of British Railways
- Thomas Beeching (1900–1971), English soldier and cricketer
- Vicky Beeching (Victoria Louise Beeching) (born 1979), British-born Christian singer

== See also ==
- Beeching Axe, informal name for the report "The Reshaping of British Railways"
