= Kensington Dollshouse Festival =

Biannual festival in London

The Kensington Dollshouse Festival, formerly the London Dollshouse Festival, is a biannual festival held at Kensington Town Hall in London for the showcase of dollhouse miniatures, founded in 1985 by Caroline Hamilton. It is considered one of the most important dolls' house festivals in Europe. The festival has a summer and a Christmas show, and over 170 exhibitors participated in the 2012 and 2018 festivals.

By 2012, former ballet dancer Charlotte Stokoe was the event's chair. In 2016 the festival gave out a 'Perfection in Miniatures Award,' sponsored by Ahmed Al-Thani, a member of the Qatari ruling dynasty.

During the COVID-19 pandemic, the event was held as an "Online Showcase" in which each craftsperson had their page on a website instead of being in-person.

== See also ==
- List of festivals in the United Kingdom
