= West Country Carnival =

Annual celebration in the English West Country

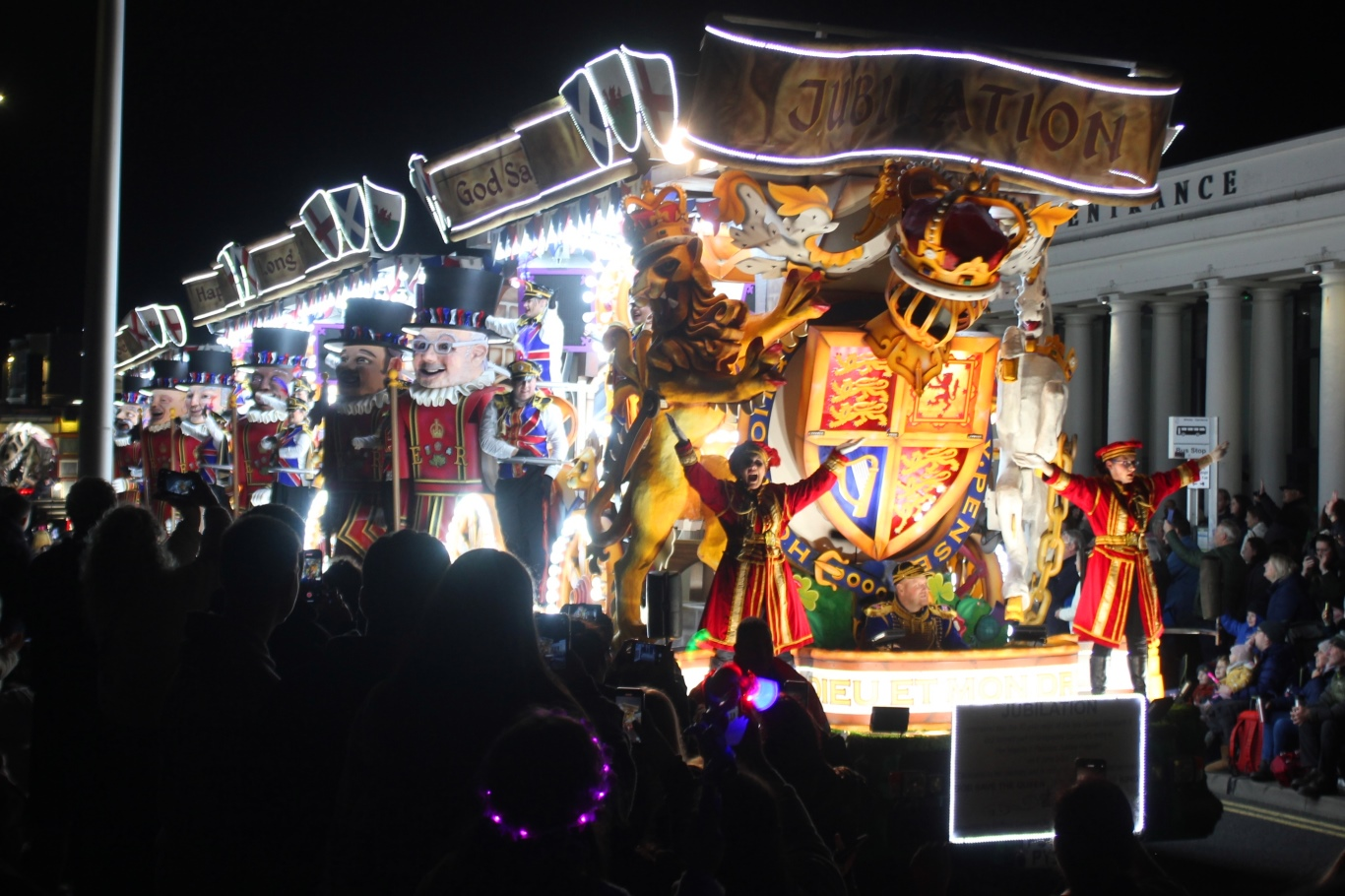
'Jubilation' was a cart jointly built by several Somerset carnival clubs that took part in the Platinum Jubilee Pageant in London and several West Country carnivals in 2022

The West Country Carnival Circuits are an annual celebration featuring a parade of illuminated carts in the English West Country. The celebration dates back to the Gunpowder Plot of 1605. The purpose is to raise money for local charities.

The series of parades in each town now form a major regional festival. Some carts cost in excess of £40,000 to build and are the result of thousands of hours' work throughout the year.

== History ==
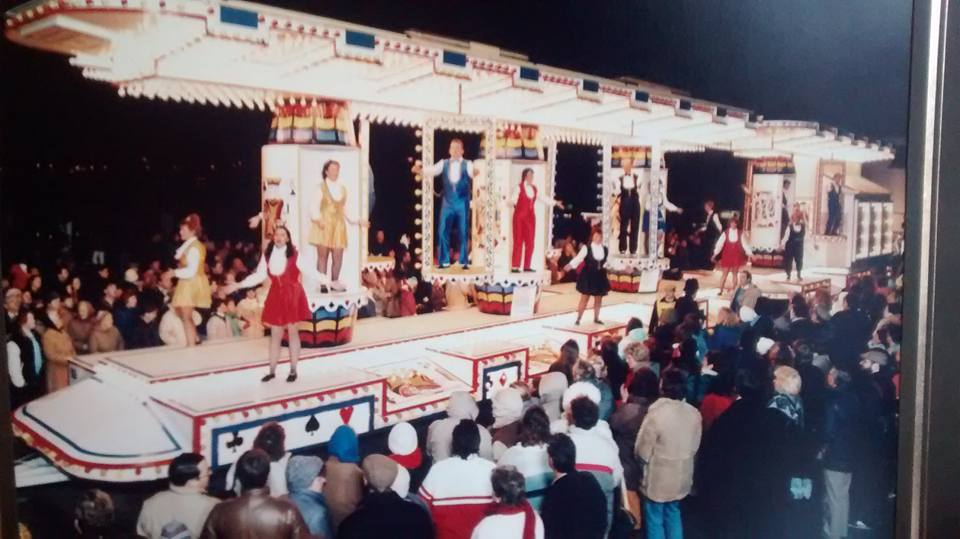
Prattens Carnival Club float 1988

The timing of the West Country Carnival close to the British celebration of Bonfire Night on 5 November is no coincidence, as the roots of the original carnival in Bridgwater date back to 1605.

Guy Fawkes is the character most associated with the plot to blow up the Houses of Parliament, however the instigator was Jesuit priest Robert Parsons from Nether Stowey, a short distance from Bridgwater. Parsons and his colleagues Edmund Campion and Ralph Emerson were Catholics, who wanted to put an end to the Protestant monarchy and parliament of the day, in order to put an end to Catholic persecution. In 1580, they were discovered attempting to garner favour with northern-English based nobility in the English Mission, and were then associated with the failed Spanish Armada of 1588, both plots to replace Protestant Elizabeth I of England with catholic Mary Queen of Scots. After the execution of Campion and natural death of Emerson, Parsons continued to plot to restore Catholic power in England, and hence his last ill-fated attempt against parliament and King James VI on 5 November 1605. After the failure of the Gunpowder Plot, Parsons was key in corresponding with Thomas Morton over the authority of use of St Paul in the creation and implementation of the Jacobean Oath of Allegiance

Bonfire night is a major annual celebration across the whole of England, but it is likely that the reason that the West Country Carnival was originally so keenly celebrated is that the South West towns were predominantly Protestant – hence the celebration of Robert Parsons' (and Guy Fawkes') failure. The religious origins of the event are almost forgotten and far less significant today.

== Bridgwater ==
"FORGED" by Gremlins CC, Bridgwater Carnival Winners 2026

The original Bridgwater celebrations consisted of a large bonfire at the Cornhill. Built out of a large wooden boat, around one hundred tar barrels were added, together with just about anything else available which could be burned. This tradition was stopped due to lack of old wooden boats to burn, and because a number of good boats were thrown onto the fire and burnt by over-enthusiastic revellers.

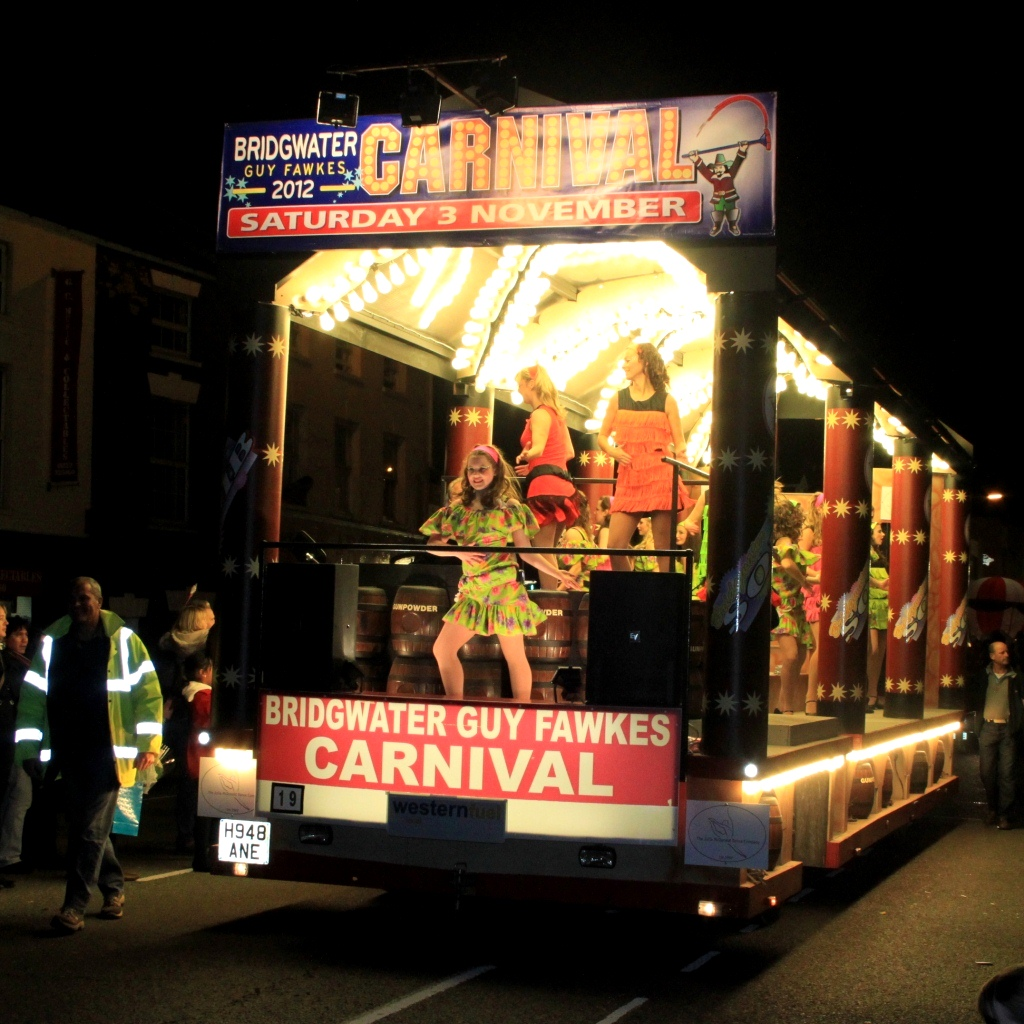
Bridgwater Carnivals own cart. Used to advertise their carnival at other carnivals, and travels at the front of every Bridgwater Carnival.

Effigies or "guys" representing the gunpowder plot instigators were added to the fire by local groups of people known as gangs. It would seem it was these gangs who started the trend towards a procession, as they paraded their guys towards the bonfire. As years passed by, the tradition was continued and the annual celebration became more and more elaborate, involving costumes, and music, until the key feature of the event was a large carnival procession.

The local people who dressed up and took part in the event were known as Masqueraders or Features - terms still used today to describe the parade participants.

There were no parades during the Second World War, but a local carnival enthusiast William Henry Edwin Lockyer also known as "Nosey" walked the carnival route for six years with a group known as The Kilties, to keep the tradition alive.

In 2020 and 2021, the procession featuring carts was cancelled due to the COVID-19 pandemic, to replace the 2020 Bridgwater procession a live stream was held on carnival night showing some of the best carnival carts over the years. In 2021, smaller Masquerade parades were put on in Bridgwater and Burnham-on-Sea, which featured most of the clubs in the previous years carnivals, enter with walking entries on a smaller route.

=== Squibbing ===
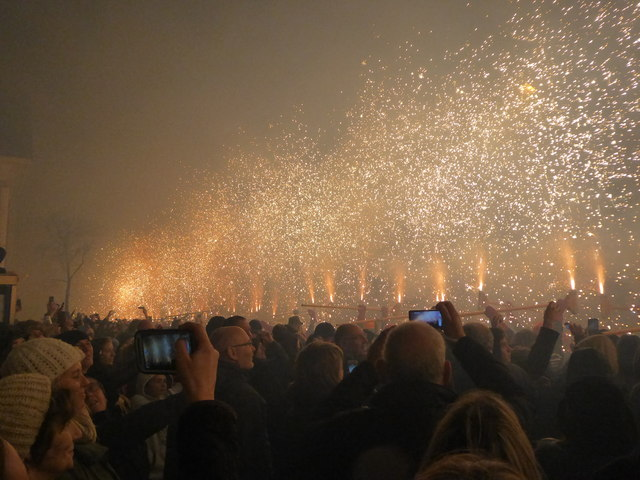
Squibbing at Bridgwater

In addition to the carnival procession, the tradition of "squibbing" still occurs after the procession ends. A squib locally is a firework which is held aloft by a person known as a "squibber" on the end of a long wooden handle called a "cosh". One hundred squibbers stand in line in Bridgwater town centre making an unusual but impressive sight for visitors who crowd the High Street.

Originally the squibs were made specially for the carnival and were known as the Bridgwater Squib, and culminated with a large bang as each squib extinguished. With modern Health and Safety concerns it has become difficult to purchase such squibs, and owing to the rising cost of insurance the present-day squibs have no bang.

Lines of flammable liquid are also run along the ground by the squibbers and lit to add to the spectacle. Visitors often think the whole sight looks a little dangerous, but the event is well organised and nobody has been hurt to date.

=== Modern times ===
The Bridgwater carnival first modernised in 1881 and was originally lit by lamps; electric lights were first introduced in 1913.

Bridgwater carnival now consists of a display of over 40 large vehicles up to 100 feet (30 m) long, festooned with dancers and up to 22,000 lightbulbs, that follows a 2.5-mile (4 km) route over two to three hours. 2005 included the Masquerade 2000 entrants from Notting Hill Carnival.

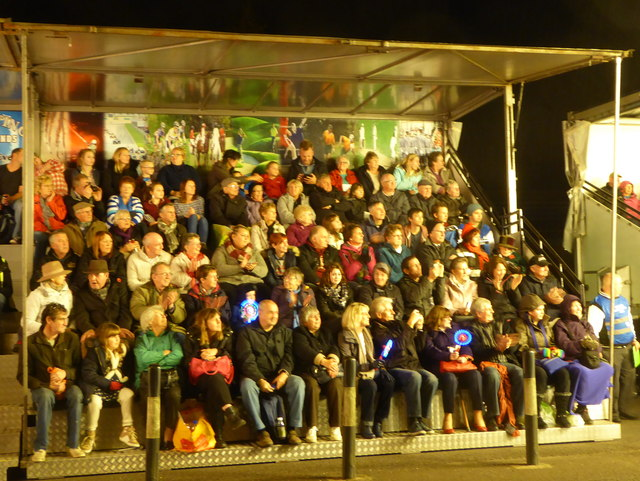
People watching Bridgwater Carnival from the grandstands.

Bridgwater attracts around 150,000 people from around the West Country, UK and globally. Public access grandstands were introduced in the mid-1990s, which have increased in popularity over recent years.

The carnival's purpose is to raise money for local charities from money collection carts in the procession. Between 2003 and 2007, around £115,000 was raised at Bridgwater Carnival.

In 2010, the Heritage Lottery Fund awarded the Carnival in Somerset Promotion Project £41,000 to promote and conserve carnival heritage. The project aims to raise awareness of the history of the carnivals within schools and the local community.

=== Carnival concert ===
The carnival concert takes place in the weeks leading up to the carnival. At these concerts, carnival clubs perform on stage wearing their costumes and using pieces of scenery. After being poorly patronised for a period, the carnival concert has become a highly popular attraction in recent years, with tickets to see the event in a Bridgwater hall selling out very quickly – partly due to increased publicity, and partly as the popularity of the carnival increases.

=== Calendar changes ===
The Bridgwater carnival had traditionally been held on Bonfire night, or 5 November. This was then formalised in 1919 after the First World War, as the carnival circuits were formed to be held on the first Thursday of November – Thursday was traditionally early closing day for shops in Bridgwater.

Local authorities and businesses were keen to the reschedule the event to a weekend date – presumably to make it more convenient for visitors to attend. This met strong resistance from many locals who believe the tradition of so many years should be maintained, and from others who are concerned that the new timing could affect the ability of clubs to participate in other local carnival processions – North Petherton carnival has traditionally taken place on the following Saturday. The new timing would also spoil another local tradition known as Black Friday, when locals celebrate their hard work on carnival in an alcoholic manner. However, accepting that shops and work times in the present have changed greatly and the local economic business need, the Bridgwater Carnival Committee decided, not without much controversy, to move the carnival to a Friday with effect from 2001. This was part of a strategy to keep the carnival alive in the long term, with the committee working with Sedgemoor District Council to provide entertainment for visitors from mid-day on carnival day.

The dates will change again from 2012, with Bridgwater on the first Saturday in November. It is hoped that as a result of the changed date many visitors will come earlier and stay longer, perhaps taking in some of the other carnivals and entertainment provided locally.

== Carnival circuit ==
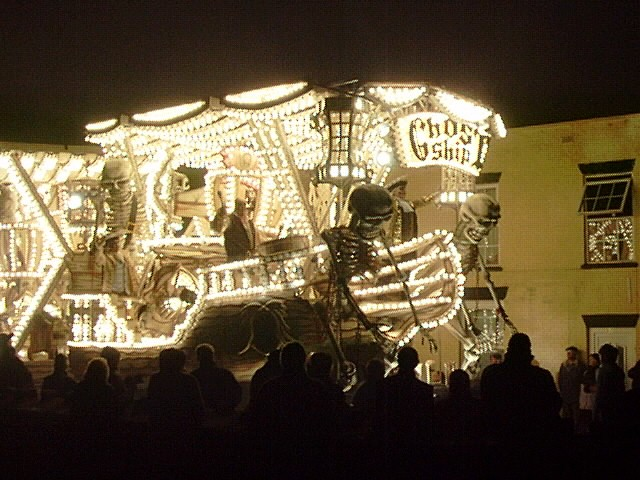
'Ghost Ship (Deliver Us)' by Gremlins CC, Burnham on Sea Carnival 2006. Winner of six prizes at Bridgwater including the "Hardy Spicer Cup" for the overall champion cart

The Bridgwater carnival was the first carnival of its type, however other carnival processions within the South West began some years ago. They start in late August and continue until late November. The oldest and largest circuit is the Somerset County Guy Fawkes Carnival Association Circuit which starts at Bridgwater, with many of the carts will appear in all of the carnivals. Prizes are awarded in several categories for the best carts in each carnival.

The four circuits are:

- East Devon Circuit: the first Saturday in September, Seaton, Colyton; Axminster; Sidmouth; Budleigh Salterton; Exmouth; Ottery St Mary; Honiton;
- Wessex Grand Prix Circuit: Mere; Frome; Shaftesbury; Gillingham; Wincanton; Castle Cary; Trowbridge; Warminster
- South Somerset Federation Circuit: Wellington held on the last Saturday in September; Ilminster; Chard; Taunton;
- Somerset County Guy Fawkes Carnival Association Circuit Bridgwater on the first Friday in November; North Petherton the day after on the Saturday; Burnham-on-Sea on the following Monday; Shepton Mallet on the following Wednesday; Wells on the following Friday; Glastonbury & Chilkwell the day after on the Saturday and Weston-super-Mare on the following Monday; the last carnival in the whole circuit
  - Circuit from 2012: Bridgwater on the first Saturday in November; Burnham-on-Sea on the following Monday; Weston-super-Mare on the following Friday; North Petherton on the second Saturday; Shepton Mallet on the following Wednesday; Wells on the following Friday; and Glastonbury on the third Saturday.

There is one unofficial carnival in the circuit, held at Midsomer Norton. There is also a series of individual carnivals not part of any circuit, including Blandford Forum, Melksham, South Brent, South Petherton.

In 2020, all the carnival circuits were cancelled due to the COVID-19 pandemic.

== Carts and floats ==
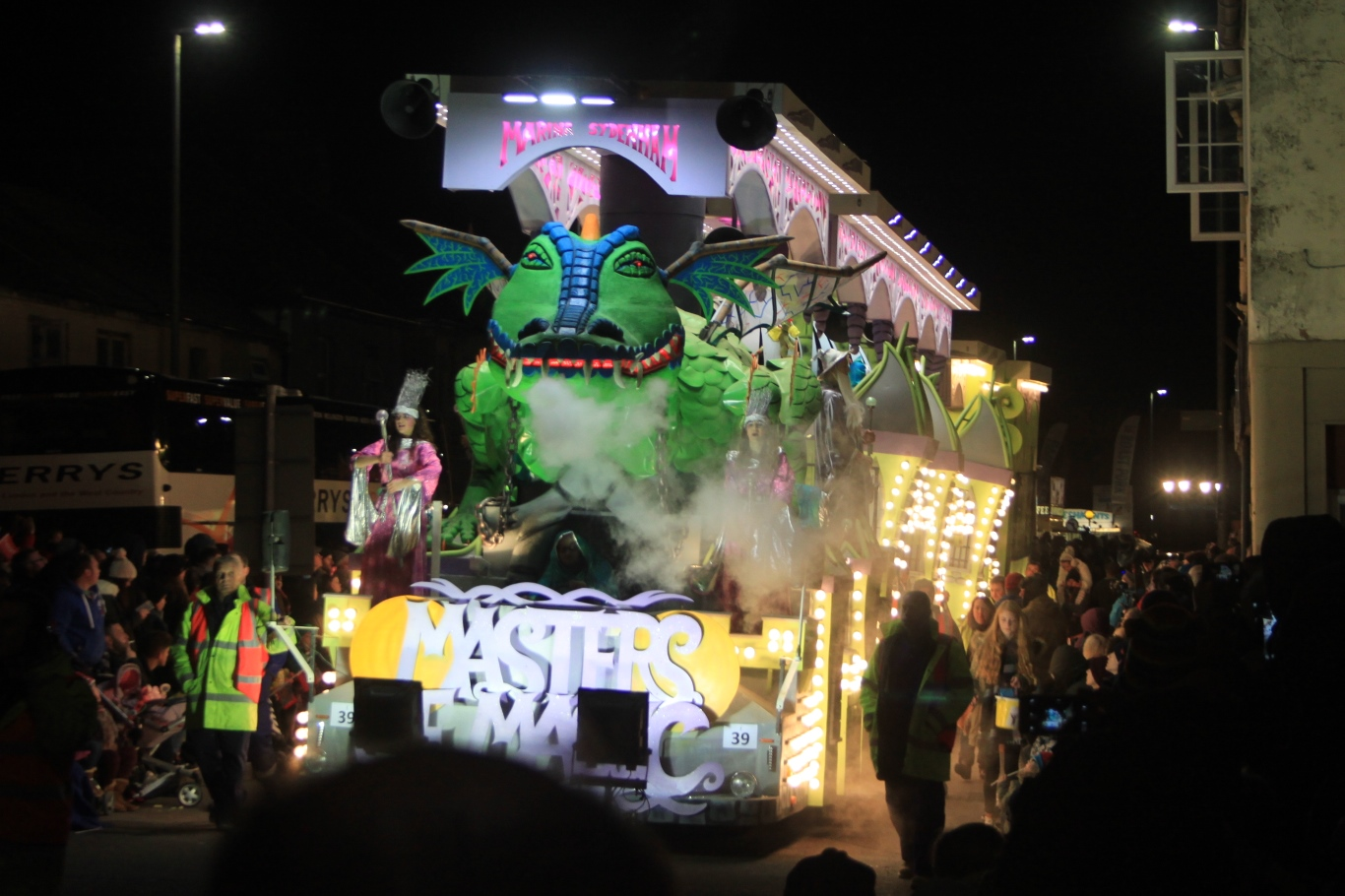
The Marina Sydenham JCC's cart for 2016 with an illuminated tractor and generator

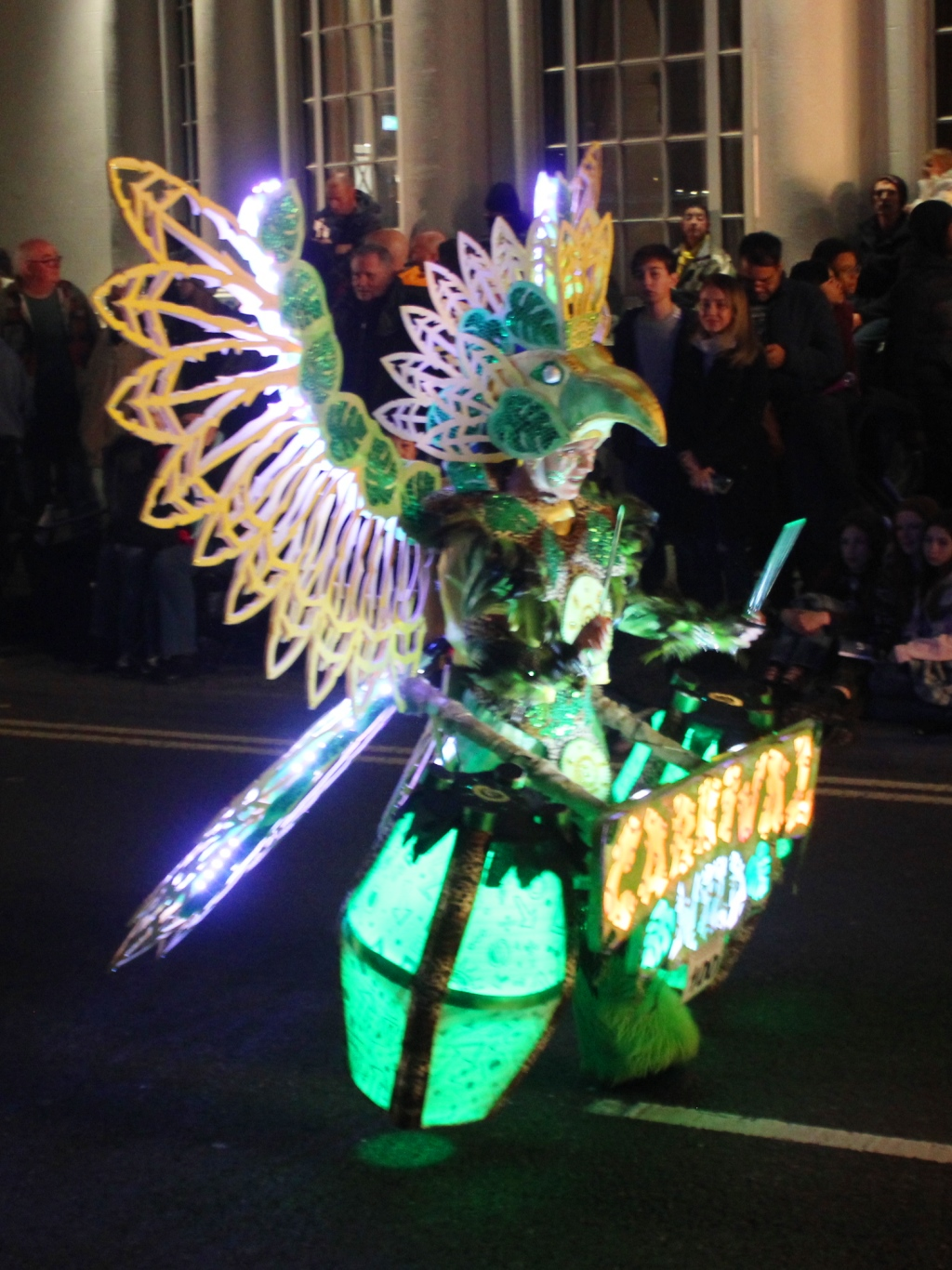
Masquerader at Weston-Super-Mare in 2022

Uniquely in the West Country, the vehicles are called carts, unlike other carnivals where the term carnival float is used. The term cart is still used today to describe the large and elaborate trailers used in the procession. Carts are built by local clubs of individuals funded totally by charitable donations and sponsorship from local businesses.

Carts are always themed, with no restriction on the theme from the organising committee. Regularly chosen themes include:

- Popular children's books — like Alice in Wonderland
- Favourite children's characters — such as Disney characters
- Scenes or themes from history — like Prehistoric, Victorian or famous Battles
- Scenes or themes from around the world — such as Australia, Rio de Janeiro or Spanish
- Travel and transport — such as cars or trains, e.g., The Chattanooga Choo-Choo
- Popular themes of the day — including pop songs or dances
- The future or exploration — such as space
- Popular films or musicals - such as War Horse, Les Misérables and Starlight Express

Carts include both music and costumed people to complete their theme. People and items on the cart can either be moving or static in tableau.

Today these carts are driven by farm tractors or trucks, and usually also tow a large diesel-driven electricity generator to provide the huge amount of power required to power the carts. Some generators used can provide over one megawatt of power, with 10,000 to 30,000 lamps not uncommon on a modern-day cart. The towing vehicles themselves are often decorated to match the rest of the cart and generator, and in some cases modified so that the driver is positioned low down between the two front wheels. This allows for a higher degree of decoration without obscuring the driver's view. The length of the entire cart is often built to the maximum allowable of 100 feet (30 m).

These carts are interspersed with walking exhibits known as masqueraders, either groups or singles, occasional marching bands or majorette troupes, and charity collectors who take donations from the spectators.

== Carnival clubs ==
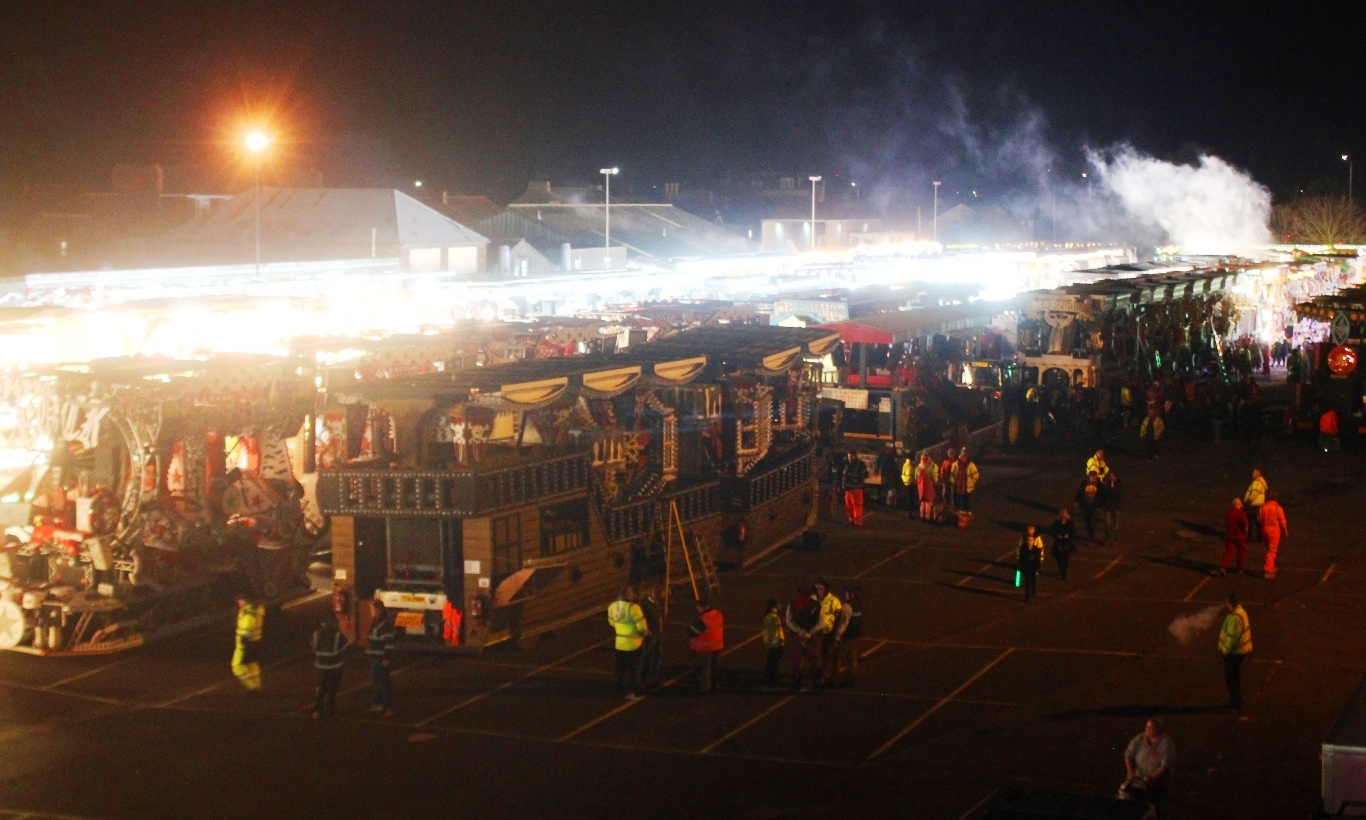
Carts being prepared by their clubs before the Weston-super-Mare carnival in 2022

Carts or floats are built by local clubs (CC), which as local charities themselves are aimed specifically and solely at raising funds for other charities which operate within their locality. Clubs generate all funds required to build and operate their carts totally by charitable donations from individuals and sponsorship from local businesses — all funds raised during the carnival season are wholly distributed by the club charity. Some carts cost in excess of £20,000 to build and are the result of thousands of man-hours work throughout the year. Most clubs are based around local working or social circles, such as pubs and clubs. Many clubs have specialist Juvenile Carnival clubs (JCC) for the under 16s. To join an adult 16 and over club, an initiation ceremony is often involved. All work is carried out in the spare time of the club members on a voluntary basis – often working all night in the final few days to get carts ready.

== See also ==
- Carnival
- Festivals in the United Kingdom

== Bibliography ==
- "Remember Remember". The Story of Bridgwater Carnival, written by Chris Hocking who was president of Bridgwater Guy Fawkes Carnival Committee
- Somerset Carnivals: A Celebration of 400 Years, Roger Evans & Peter Nichols, ISBN 1-84114-483-5
- "Bridgwater with and without the 'e' " ', Roger Evans, ISBN 0-9525674-0-7
- A History of Bridgwater, J.C. Lawrence, ISBN 1-86077-363-X
- Bridgwater Victorian Days, Philip James Squibbs, ISBN 0-9501022-1-0
- Somerset in the Age of Steam, Peter Stanier, ISBN 0-86183-481-X
- Everyone's A Winner, Brendon Hill.
