= Beached Festival =

Free annual music festival in Scarborough, England

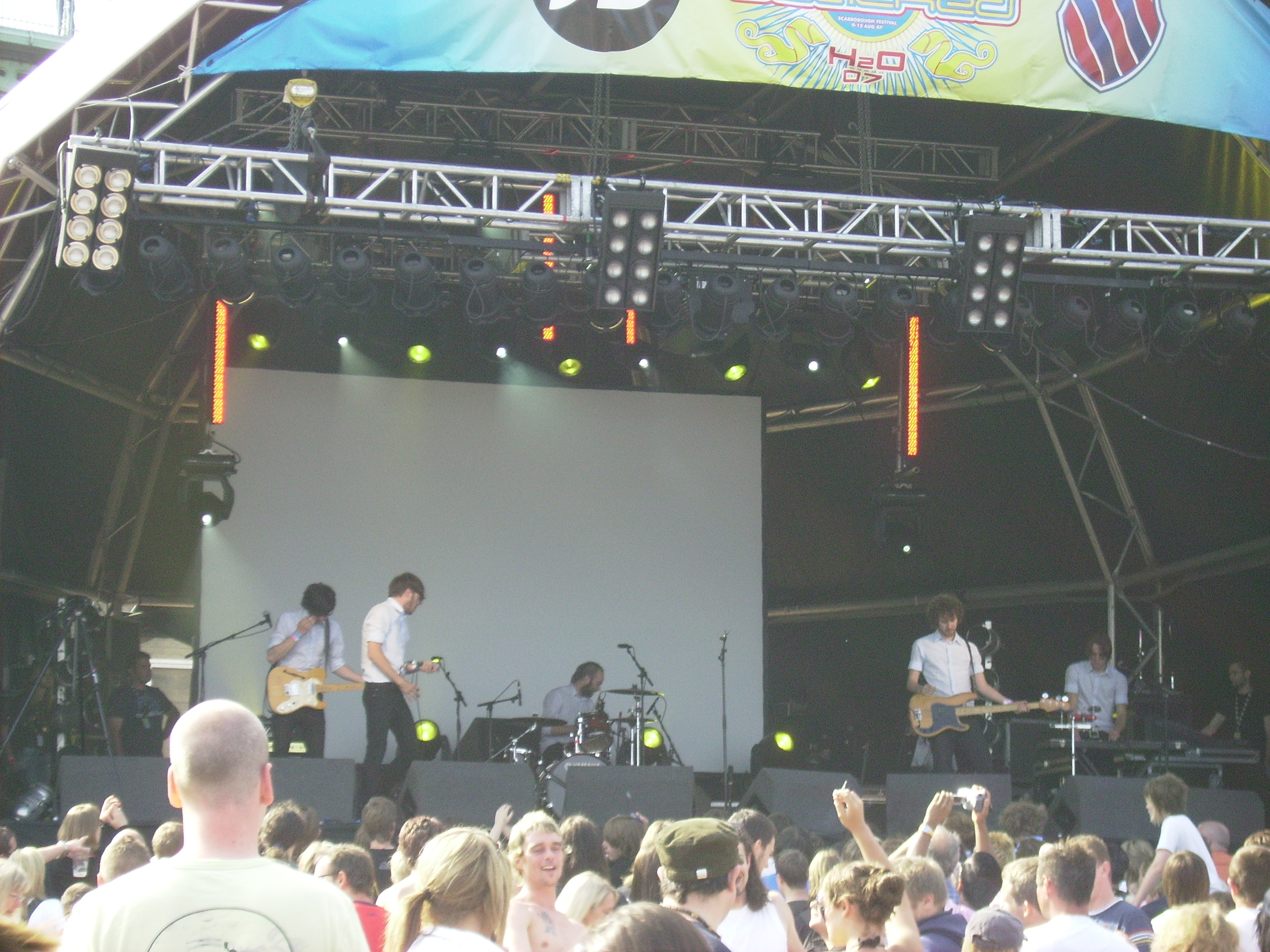
The Beached Festival 2007

The Beached Festival was a free festival held annually in Scarborough, North Yorkshire, England. After six years it had become the largest free festival on England's east coast. It last took place in its original format in 2008.

== History ==
The festival started in 2001 as a small gig which gained some interest from local bands and DJs. During the second year The Libertines played without their front man. In 2005 the festival lasted two extra days, one of which was a film night and the other an orchestral night. In 2006 a Big Band played instead of the orchestra.

To fund the festival a small grant was obtained from Scarborough Borough Council and the rest came from corporate sponsorship.

As the festival expanded more popular bands appeared on the beached stage including The Libertines, The Fratellis, Electric Eel Shock (Who appeared in 2003 and then returned in 2005 to play with The West Yorkshire Symphony Orchestra), The Enemy, Thunder, Parva (now the Kaiser chiefs), The Bluetones, The Quireboys and Nine Black Alps between the years 2001 and 2006.

From the 2005 festival onwards, the first evening was a film night, with films such as Little Voice and The Blues Brothers being shown.

=== 2007 ===
2007 saw big name sponsors paying for national media adverts in the NME. The festival was headlined by Nine Black Alps and Inme and included established acts such as Foals, Frank Turner, One Night Only, The Hoosiers, Amy Macdonald, DARTZ!, Alabama 3 and The Paddingtons.

The event was set back slightly by predicted high tides, which forced the 1,500-strong crowd off the beach, onto the road for nearly an hour and a half.

=== 2008 ===
In 2008, One Night Only and Dodgy were the headliners with acts such as The Ryes, Flamboyant Bella, Be Quiet. Shout Loud!, Sergeant, Natty, The Paddingtons and Ebony Bones also appearing. Over 35,000 people walked through the site, with nearly 3,000 people on site at any time. Graham Rhodes, performance poet was the MC for every Beached apart from the first one.

It was alleged a sexual assault occurred at this festival; the organisers cooperated with the North Yorkshire Police investigations, which led to a Crown Court hearing. At the time of the incident, organisers were holding emergency meetings with the concessions and catering firm (who run T in the Park) who were disappointed with the turn-out. The firm packed up on the Saturday night leaving the beach without any catering provisions.

F10, a company who helped raise the funds for the festival to take place, refused to pay the organisers over £30,000 which was gained from sponsorship of the event. This left H2O Beached Ltd, the company which ran the festival heavily in debt and it was liquidated in May 2009. Many of volunteers who had run the festival were left out of pocket.

=== From 2009 ===
In 2009 Scarborough Borough Council and The North Yorkshire Police refused to give permission for the event, partly because of safety and public disorder concerns, and because of financial issues remaining outstanding. The organiser told the press that the event would not be going ahead for personal reasons, although the Scarborough Evening News reported later that H2O: Beached Ltd had been liquidated, owing £38,000 to various creditors.

Rumours of a 2010 festival started on Facebook when the organiser suggested a date for the festival, but permission was not given and the Open Air Theatre, who were also rumoured to play host to the event did not host it. However, the event was revived at the Open Air Theatre in August 2011, albeit on a smaller scale, and with a charge for entry.

== See also ==
- List of music festivals in the United Kingdom
- Festivals in the United Kingdom
