= Scotland's Countryside Festival =

Coordinates: 56.623°N 3.002°W

Scotland's Countryside Festival is an annual two-day event which takes place at Glamis Castle, by Forfar.

The festival originally came about in the wake of the 2007 outbreak of foot and mouth disease. The organisers hoped to try to develop something that would be good for the rural economy after the devastation that disease brought. During the outbreak, businesses closed and events were cancelled because people were asked not to move about the countryside. The Festival was intended as a sign of confidence in the future of rural activities.

Scotland's Countryside Festival takes place in the parklands of Glamis Castle, the childhood home of Queen Elizabeth the Queen Mother. The festival is the largest event of its kind in the east of Scotland.

Events hosted at Scotland's Countryside Festival include:

- Scottish Food Fortnight;
- The Fife and Kinross Working Terrier Association Terrier and Lurcher Show; and
- Scottish Countryside Alliance Educational Trust Countryside Day.
