= Land of Kings =

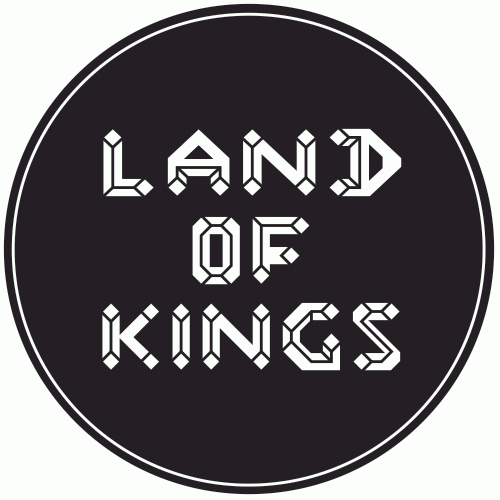
- Genre: Various: Music & Arts
- Dates: April/May
- Locations: Dalston, London, England
- Founded: 2009
- Founder: Nick Griffiths and Connie Harrison

Land of Kings is a music and arts festival that took place at various locations throughout the London Borough of Hackney from 2009 to 2015. The festival occurred in May, with live music and interactive art across indoor and outdoor locations in Dalston. The ticket price was equal to one wristband allowing attendees access to all the participating venues, along with a map of the festival site.

== Origins ==
The festival was established in 2009 by Nick Griffiths and Connie Harrison.

== Description ==
The festival included record labels, arts organisations, and curators local to East London. Land of Kings used a mix of clubs, bars, arts venues and temporary event spaces, with the layout changing each year. The festival artwork was by Hackney-based artist Colin Henderson.

The ticket price was equal to one wristband allowing attendees access to all the participating venues, along with a map of the festival site.

== Past line-ups ==
=== 2009 ===
Allez Allez, An Experiment on a Bird in the Air Pump, Ben Westbeech, Chrome Hoof DJs, ColouringIN, Crystal Vision, David E. Sugar, Drums of Death (musician), Erol Alkan, Fimber Bravo, Fuck Buttons DJs, Get The Blessing, Greco Roman Soundsystem, Hot Coins (Red Rack'em), Ian Woods & The Psychologist, Idjut Boys, Johnno, Kathy Diamond, Leggo Beast, Liamski & Beccy Grierson (SpaceBass), Living in A Disco, Lou and Nova, Newfamily, Oriole, Quiet Village, Rory Phillips, Ross Allen, Soft Rocks, Sonny Akpan, Sportsday Megaphone, Tayo Popoola, Three Uninvited, Todd Hart (Dalston Oxfam Shop), Totally Enormous Extinct Dinosaurs, Unnamed Project.

=== 2010 ===
Arne Blackman, Bill Brewster, Cheatah DJs, Clancy, Cocknbullkid DJ set, Deep Teknologi, Detachments (British band), Dignan Porch, Dollop DJs, Faze Action, Feeding Time, Firas, Girlcore, Gyratory System, Jonny Rock, Kindness DJ set, Lovers & Gamblers, Lovvers DJs, Magnets, Matty J & Ben Terry, Nadia Ksaiba, Night Angles, Raf Daddy, Ronojoy Dam, Rory Phillips, Savage Beach, Sexbeat, Simon A. Carr, Soft Rocks, Sound of Rum, Speakers Corner Quartet, Spectral Empire, Spin Spin the Dogs, The Horrors DJs, Thomas Bullock, Transparent DJs, Wet Paint DJs, Yuck (band).

=== 2011 ===
Land of Kings 2011 took place earlier than usual to coincide with the Royal Wedding between The Duke and Duchess of Cambridge, joining in with the nationwide festivities celebrating the occasion. The festival partnered with film director Saam Farahmand and Absolut Vodka to create an interactive video installation based around portraits of attending party-goers. The installation was soundtracked by 2many DJs.

2many DJs, Alex Patchwork, Bleeding Heart Narrative, Brassroots, Clancy, D/R/U/G/S, Deboa, Django Django, Drums of Death (musician), Eeek Empire, Funkineven, Gang Colours, Ghostpoet, Gwilym Gold (live), Hannah Holland, Idjut Boys, In Flagranti, Isa GT, Jahcoozi, James Yuill, Keaton, Klaxons DJs, Lou & Nova, Mama, Mumdance, My Tiger My Timing, Hannah Holland, Naomii, Night Angles, Om Unit, Ragga Twins, Ray Mang, Riton, Romy XX, Rory Phillips, Shut Up & Dance, Skinny Lister, Soft Rocks, Streets of Beige, Thomas Whitehead, Tristian, Vince Vella, Visions of Trees, Wild Geese, Zara Mcfarlane, Zara Truss Giles.

=== 2012 ===
Aboutface & Champetamine, Alexander Nut, Alex Patchwork, All The Queen's Ravens, Ant Hill, Ben Westbeech, BestCleo, Bicep, Bos Angeles, Boss Terror, Bullion, Camille Walala, Caze Nove, Clash DJs, Classic Album Sundays, Comadisco, Connan Mockasin. Dalston Darlings, Dan Beaumont, Dark Shaft, DJ King Knut, Dollop DJs, Dreamtrak, Durrr, Eglo Live Band, Eliphino, Elliot Yorke, Esser (band), Factory Floor, Famy, Fever Dream, Five Easy Pieces, Four Aces, Funkineven, Gang Colours DJ set, Great Waves, Gwilym Gold DJ set, Hackney Film Festival, Hall of Mirrors, Hammer & Tongue, Hannah Holland, Hatcham Social, Is Tropical, Johnno & Charlotte (Bugged Out), Kutmah, Kwes, Kwesachu, Land Shapes, Legacy In The Dust, Let Us Be Golden, Literary Death Match, Living in A Disco, London Fields Radio, Make It Stop Mum, Male Bonding (band), Maria Minerva, Maurice Fulton, Mo Kolours, Moshi Moshi DJs, My Panda Shall Fly, Naomii, Night Angles, NTS DJs, NZCA/Lines, O Children, Ollie Rant, Owiny Sigoma Soundsystem, Public Information DJs, Raf Daddy, Ray Mang, Richard Clancy, Rory Phillips, Royalty, Slagbox, Slow Club, Soft Rocks, Speech Debelle, Spirit of Mantra, Standard Planets, Stay+, Stealing Sheep, Stoke Newington International Airport, Tayo Popoola, The Austerity Games, The Horrors DJ set, The Invisible (band), The Lovely Jonjo, To The Lazer Cave DJs, Toy, Trevor Jackson (musician), Trophy Wife, Virginia Wing, We Were Evergreen, Wicked Wicked, Winstan Whitter, ZTG.

=== 2013 ===
A Love From Outer Space, Andrew Weatherall, Avarus, Babe, Bo Ningen, Boxed In, Brownswood, Bugged Out, Camille Walala, Casual Sex, Chrome Hoof, Circle Traps, Clancy, Clash, Dan Beaumont, Dark Sky, Darkstar, Drums of Death, Durrr, Fanfarlo, Faze Action, Fimber Bravo, Five Easy Pieces, Flako, Friendly Fires DJ, Gaggle, G R E A T W A V E S, Gang Colours, Gentlemen, Gideon Reeling, Halls, Hammer and Tongue, Hannah Holland, House Of Hot Breath, Landshapes, To The Lazer Cave, London Fields Radio, Lost Picture Show, The Lovely Jonjo, Low Life DJs, Midnight Davis, Moshi Moshi, Mr Bingo, Musical Bingo, The Nest Collective, N.E.W., NYPC, Night Works, PVT, Paradise, Petit Records, Poetry Takeaway, Public Information DJs, Raffertie, Reggae Roast, Rory Phillips, Sean Johnston, Seams, Sega Bodega, Soft Rocks, Stevie Neale, Shut Up and Dance, Sweet Baboo, Tayo, Totally Enormous Extinct Dinosaurs, Tee Circus, Tropics, Troumaca, The Wave Pictures, Week Of Wonders, Wicked Wicked, William Adamson.

=== 2015 ===
The 2 Bears, Art Macabre, Antepop, Boxed In, Brolin, Capablanca, Chloe Black, Chris Troy, Crucial & Fresh, Dalston Darlings: Loose Women, Don Letts, Esther Joy Lane, Flying Ibex, Flyte, Ghost Culture, Gideon Reeling: The Big Queen's Navy, Hairy Hands, Hot Breath Karaoke, Huntleys + Palmers, HVOB, Increments: Vitamins, Koreless, Krankbrother, Laish, Landshapes, Lena Willikens, Let's Be Brief: Place Is The Space, Lex Luger, London Short Film Festival, Looking Glass Cocktail Club, Lost Picture Show, Meilyr Jones, Mo Kolours, Moshi Moshi DJs, Moxie, My Panda Shall Fly, Nathan Fake, Nick Rasie, NZCA Lines, Pool DJs, Portico, Psychemagik, Public Information DJs, Russ Chimes, Soft Rocks, Soul Jazz Sound System, Tape Club, Thomas McCarthy, Thris Tian, Thump DJs, Toby Gale, Tom Vek (solo/AV set), Tony Poland, Ultrademon, Waze & Odyssey, Wolf Music, Wyles & Simpson, Zanzibar Chanel.
