= Thomas Beeching =

English cricketer

Personal information
- Full name: Thomas Hugh Pitt Beeching
- Born: 10 March 1900; Maidstone, Kent
- Died: 31 December 1971 (aged 71); Aldershot, Hampshire
- Batting: Right-handed

Domestic team information
- Years: Team
- 1920–1921: Kent

Career statistics
Competition	First-class
Matches	10
Runs scored	217
Batting average	16.69
100s/50s	0/0
Top score	38
Catches/stumpings	1/–
- Source: CricInfo, 8 March 2017

Lieutenant-Colonel Thomas Hugh Pitt Beeching (10 March 1900 – 31 December 1971) was an English businessman, soldier and cricketer who played first-class cricket in the early 1920s.

== Early life ==
Beeching was born at Maidstone in Kent in March 1900, the son of Hugh and Pearl Beeching. His father was a Major in the Royal West Kent Regiment who later went on to work as a manager in a paper manufacturing firm. Beeching was educated at Charterhouse School, playing in the cricket XI in 1917 when he averaged 81.66 runs per innings. He also captained Charterhouse at association football, played in the racquets pair and was considered a fine all-round sportsman, winning the victor ludorum award at school.

After leaving school, Beeching attended Royal Military College, Sandhurst in 1918 and was commissioned into the Royal West Kents in November 1918 at the end of World War I. He served as a Lieutenant with the first and third battalions of the RWK throughout 1920 before resigning his commission in December 1920 to join the family firm Beechings, a motor vehicle engineering company in Aldershot.

== Cricket ==
Beeching had captained the cricket team whilst at Sandhurst. He scored a century against Royal Military Academy, Woolwich at Lord's and on the strength of this performance and his reputation from school cricket, was selected for Kent County Cricket Club in 1920. He played in eight first-class matches during 1920 and two in 1921 as a lower-order batsman, as well as making a single Second XI appearance for Kent in 1923. He played club cricket for Band of Brothers, Free Foresters and I Zingari.

== War service ==
With the threat of war looming, he was activated from the Reserve of Officers in May 1939 and served throughout World War II with the Royal Army Service Corps. He landed in Algeria with the First Army in December 1942 and was awarded an MBE in 1943 whilst serving as a Major involved in logistics operations during the North African campaign. He later served in Italy and was Mentioned in Dispatches in 1944. He reached the rank of Lieutenant-Colonel before being demobilised in October 1945.

== Later life ==
Beeching had married Elizabeth Harrison in 1929. He was active in motor vehicle trader associations and after World War II was the managing director of Beechings until he retired in 1965. He died at Aldershot in 1971 aged 71.

== Bibliography ==
- Carlaw, Derek (2020). Kent County Cricketers, A to Z: Part One (1806–1914) (PDF). Cardiff: ACS.
