= Lyme Regis Fossil Festival =

Annual festival held on the Jurassic Coast at Lyme Regis, Dorset, England

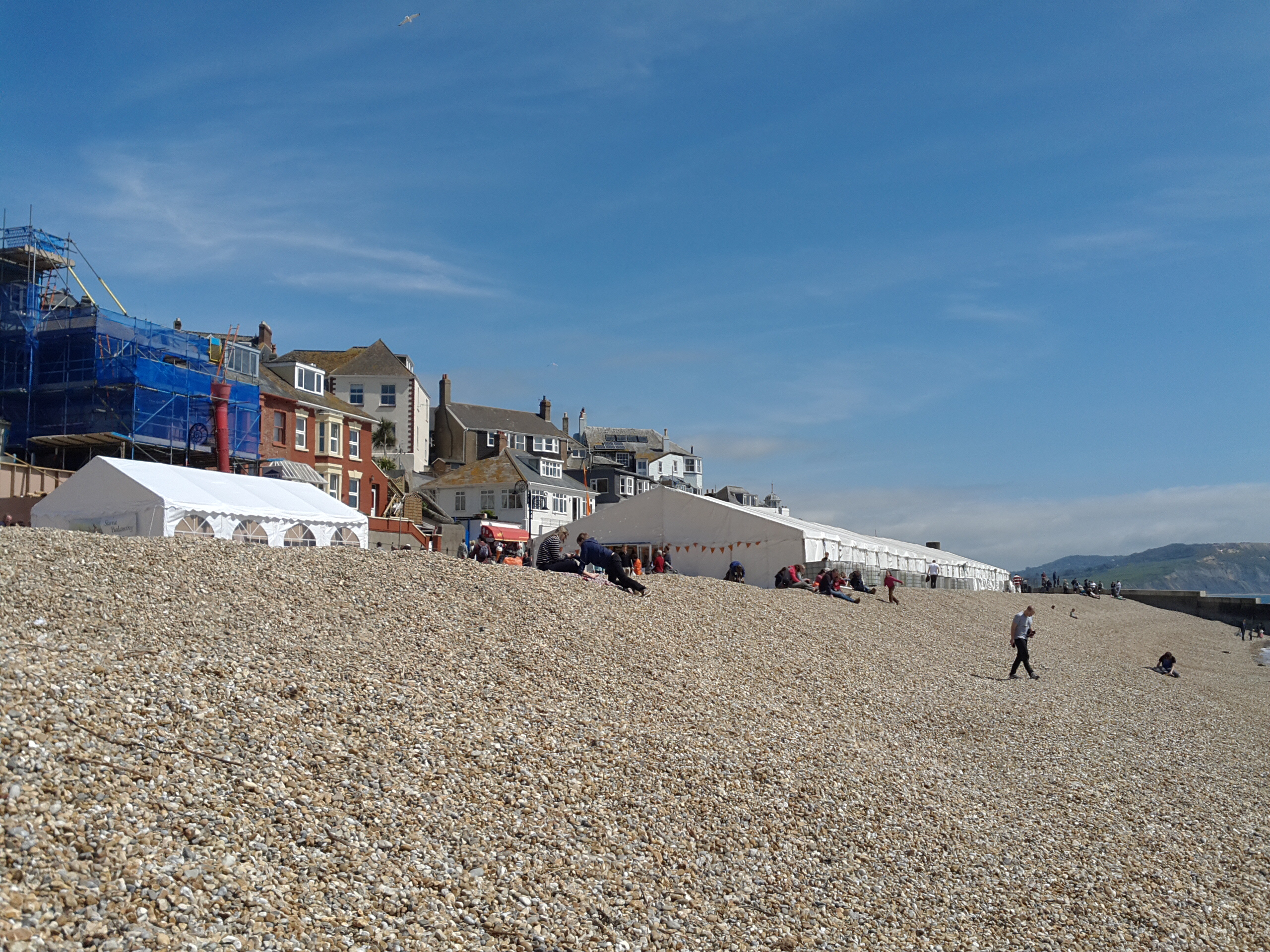
The festival tent in 2013

The Lyme Regis Fossil Festival is an annual festival held at Lyme Regis on the Jurassic Coast of East Devon and Dorset. It exists to celebrate the unique geological heritage of Lyme Regis and the Jurassic Coast and to educate the public on advances in natural environment research, and especially palaeontology. It is organised by the Lyme Regis Development Trust with major support from the Natural History Museum in London and the Jurassic Coast team.

It was the idea of Dr Paul Davis of the Natural History Museum who worked with Marcus Dixon of the Lyme Regis Development Trust and Liz-Anne Bawden of the Lyme Regis Museum to establish the first one in 2005 and since then it has regularly occurred over the early May Bank Holiday Weekend.

The festival includes a wide range of activities run primarily by scientists from the Natural History Museum, various universities, and scientific societies. There are also guided fossil collecting walks, scientific talks, a wide range of stalls run by fossil preparators and collectors, and related art events such as a replica of a Victorian iguanodon.

In 2007 the festival hosted a UNESCO Youth Climate Change Summit and in 2012 the festival formed part of the 2012 Cultural Olympiad linked to the London Olympic Games.
