= Clarence Park Festival =

Music festival in Yorkshire, England

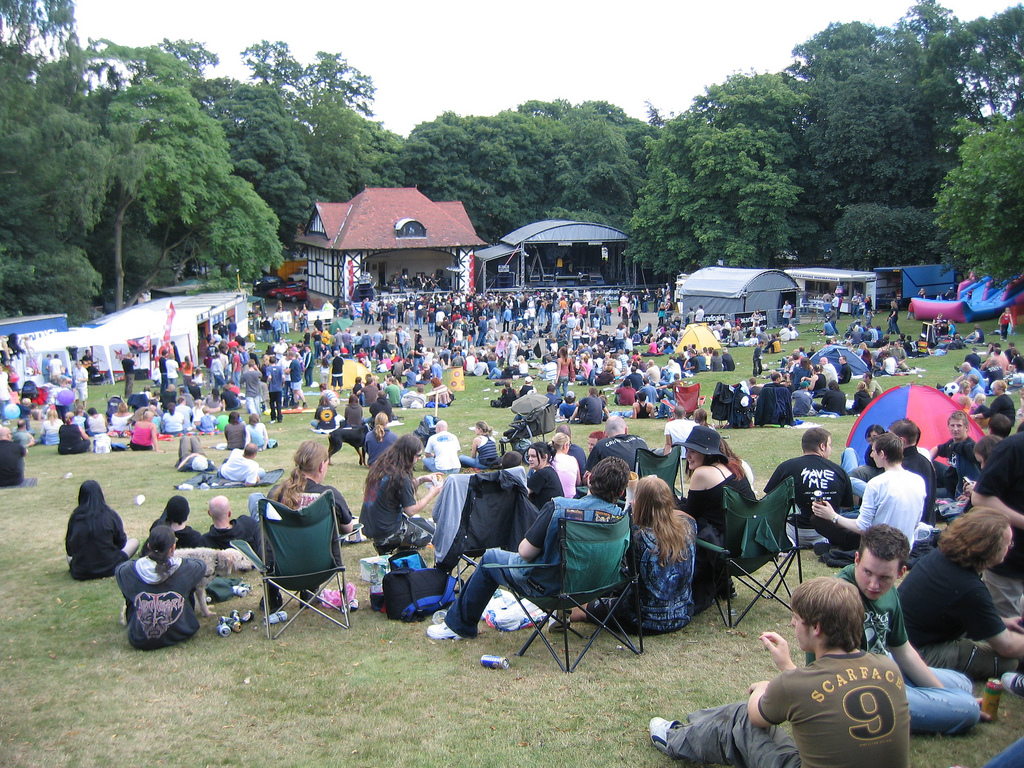
- Genre: Alternative music, rock
- Dates: 26 & 27 July
- Locations: Wakefield, West Yorkshire, England
- Years active: 23
- Founders: Wakefield Music Collective
- Website: themusiccollective.co.uk

Clarence Park Festival is the longest running free music festival in Yorkshire, England. Known initially as Clarence Rocks Off it has been held annually at the bandstand in Clarence Park, Wakefield since 1991.

It is the flagship event for Wakefield Music Collective, a non-profit community group with open membership. Estimated attendance of the festival ranges between 2,000 and 8,000 depending on weather, and it is funded largely through grants, corporate sponsorship and other fundraising events throughout the year.

The 23rd Festival took place on the weekend of 26 and 27 July 2014. During those two days the Festival showcased a host of bands as well as craft and food stalls, and a beer tent.

== Artist selection process ==
Most artists are chosen by The Music Collective via a democratic application process which invites bands to apply via an online portal or a form which is emailed to the Wakefield Music Collective. Assessment and voting takes place from the end of the previous festival up until March in the following year, Selection takes place in April, followed by a press launch in May. The event is traditionally opened each day by a Wakefield-based act or a Youth act. There are no hard-and-fast rules on which genres are allowed to apply or play.

Alongside local acts, over the years the lineup has included, Dodgy, Eddie and The Hot Rods, Zodiac Mindwarp & The Love Reaction, John Otway and The Cribs' first band Wrinkle.
