= Church of the Sacred Heart of Jesus and St Cuthbert =

Church in Bedford, England

Coordinates: 52.136979°N 0.462904°W

St Cuthbert's Church
- Polish Church of Sacred Heart of Jesus & St Cuthbert
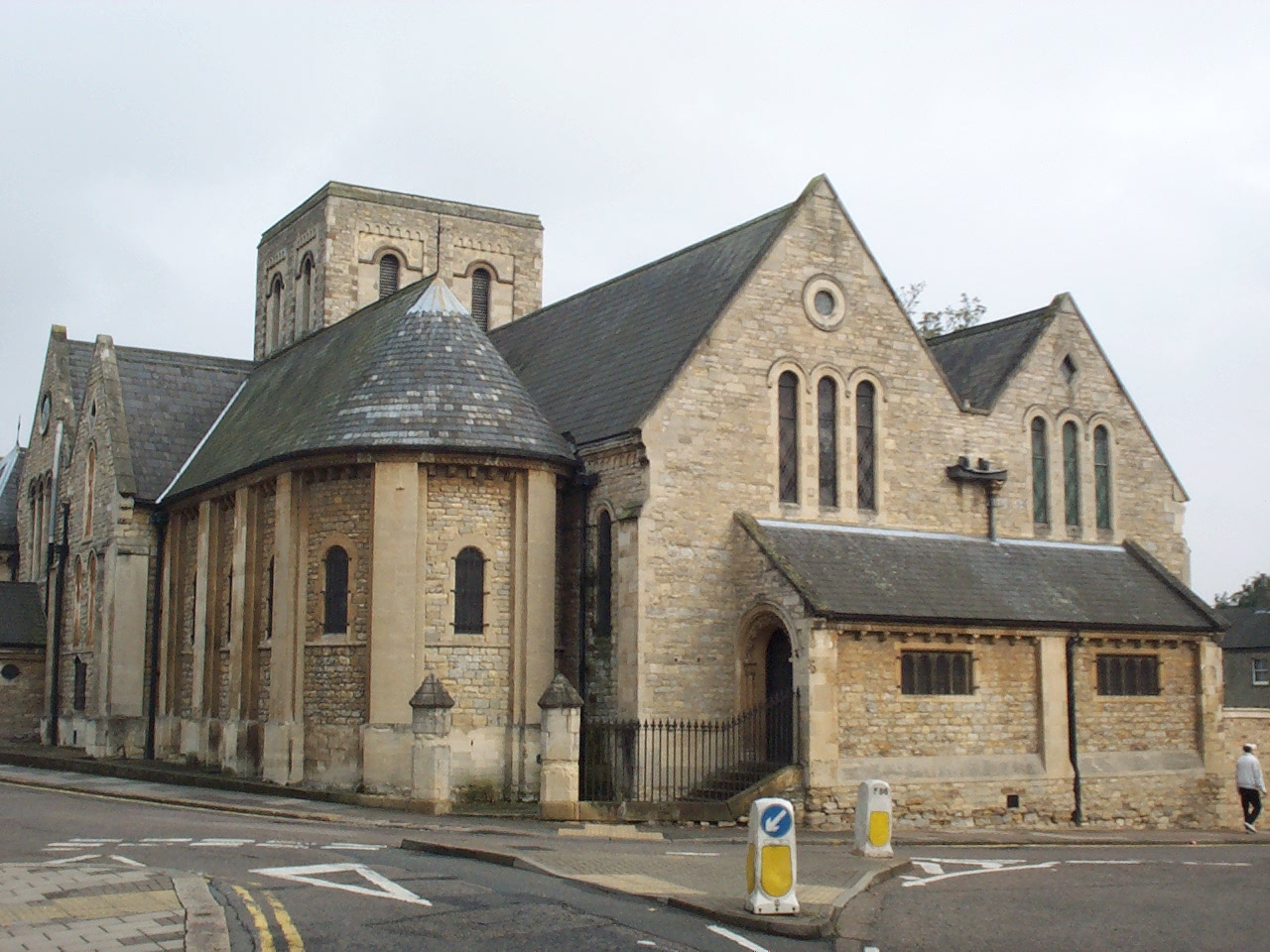
- St Cuthbert's Church
- Country: England
- Denomination: Roman Catholic
- Churchmanship: Polish

History
- Status: Parish church
- Dedication: Sacred Heart; Cuthbert of Lindisfarne

Architecture
- Functional status: Active
- Groundbreaking: 1846

Administration
- Province: Westminster
- Diocese: Northampton
- Deanery: St. Francis (Bedford)

Clergy
- Priest: Rev. Tomasz Maziarz

The Polish Church of Sacred Heart of Jesus & St Cuthbert is a Roman Catholic Church serving the Polish community in Bedford, England. It is a Grade II listed building.

== History ==
There have been religious buildings on the site since the eighth century, but the current church building was originally constructed as an Anglican church in 1846–7 in a neo-Norman style, and was known simply as St Cuthbert. The architect for the north and south aisles, which were added in 1865, was Francis Penrose. The north transept porch was constructed in 1907. Declared redundant by the Church of England in 1974, the church was subsequently purchased by the Harpur Trust who presented it to the Polish population of Bedford, whereupon its name was changed.

== Parish ==
In addition to serving the Polish community, the church also hosted a regular Tridentine Mass said by the priests of the Priestly Fraternity of St. Peter for a few years, but this later moved to other locations in the Diocese of Northampton before returning to another church in Bedford.
