= London History Festival =

- Genre: Literary festival
- Date: November
- Frequency: Annually
- Location: London
- Country: United Kingdom
- Inaugurated: 2009
- Founder: Richard Foreman
- Sponsor: Kensington Central Library

The London History Festival is a literary festival. It was established by Richard Foreman in 2009. It is run in association with Kensington Central Library and is held in November of each year. The festival consists of a series of talks and discussions followed by book signings.

In 2009, the festival hosted talks on the themes of "women in history" (with Alison Weir, Sarah Gristwood and Clare Mulley), and "greatest battles and war reporting" as well as an event on the academic history of the English Civil War by John Adamson, interviewed by the editor of History Today Paul Lay. History Today has supported the Festival since it started and became a sponsor from the second year.

In 2010, the festival hosted talks by Antony Beevor discussing his books about World War II and Roger Moorhouse who spoke about how the opening up of East German and Russian archives after the fall of the Soviet Union has changed our view of the period. That year there were also panel events on the Tudors and the Victorian era Victorian era. Tom Holland and Paul Lay also hosted an event on Rome and Carthage. In 2011, the festival hosted talks by Max Hastings, Saul David, Helen Castor, Imogen Robertson, Alex von Tunzelmann, and Simon Sebag Montefiore.

In 2012, the festival hosted talks by Paul Lay, Kate Williams, Keith Lowe, Leonie Frieda, Tom Holland, Antony Beevor, Paddy Ashdown, Sam Willis, and Patrick Bishop.

In 2013, the festival hosted talks by Max Hastings, Charles Moore, Dan Snow, Marc Morris, Antonia Fraser, Saul David, and Artemis Cooper.
