= Bedford River Festival =

Biennial event in Bedford, England

Coordinates: 52.134°N 0.462°W

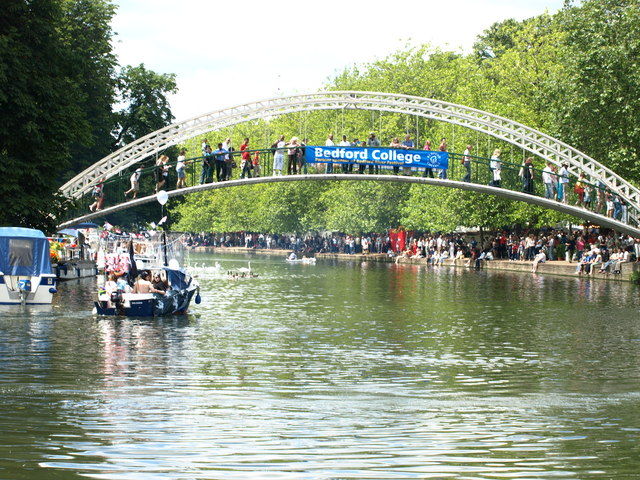
- Bedford Suspension Bridge - 2008 festival
- Frequency: Biennial
- Locations: Bedford, England
- Years active: 1978-
- Founders: Bedford Borough Council
- Most recent: 18 July 2026 – 19 July 2026
- Next event: tbc
- Attendance: 250,000
- Website: https://riverfestival.bedford.gov.uk/

The Bedford River Festival is a free festival held biennially in Bedford, England on the banks of the River Great Ouse.

== History ==
Bedford River Festival was founded in 1978 to celebrate the completion of a navigable route, by water, between Bedford and The Wash. Originally it was held annually during the late May bank holiday but for many years has been biennial and held over either the second or third weekend in July.

The festival attracts an estimated 250,000 people over the weekend, and boat owners from across the country. It is believed to be the second largest free outdoor event in the United Kingdom, after the Notting Hill Carnival.

Music across the five stages has included headliners such as the Dub Pistols, and DJs such as DJ Spoony, Fabio and Danny Rampling, various local bands as well as community choirs and singers.

Following redevelopment of part of the riverside, the 2018 festival expanded into neighbouring St Mary's Gardens, site of a previous free music festival named Lazy Sunday.

The 2020 festival was cancelled due to the COVID-19 pandemic. The event successfully returned in July 2022 with the next Bedford River Festival scheduled to take place in July 2026.

There was criticism over the Police use of facial recognition at the 2024 festival.

== Festival programme ==
The festival has grown significantly in recent years, with:

- Multiple stages - including the main stage, community stages, an acoustic stage, and dance music stage
- Boat shows/parades of narrowboats and yachts
- A parade with floats of local organisations and businesses
- Races - including raft races, dragon boat races, canoeing
- Community field - for local charities and organisations
- A sports village
- Street food area
- An arts and crafts area
- A travelling funfair
- A firework display and light show
- Vehicle rally

== Image gallery ==
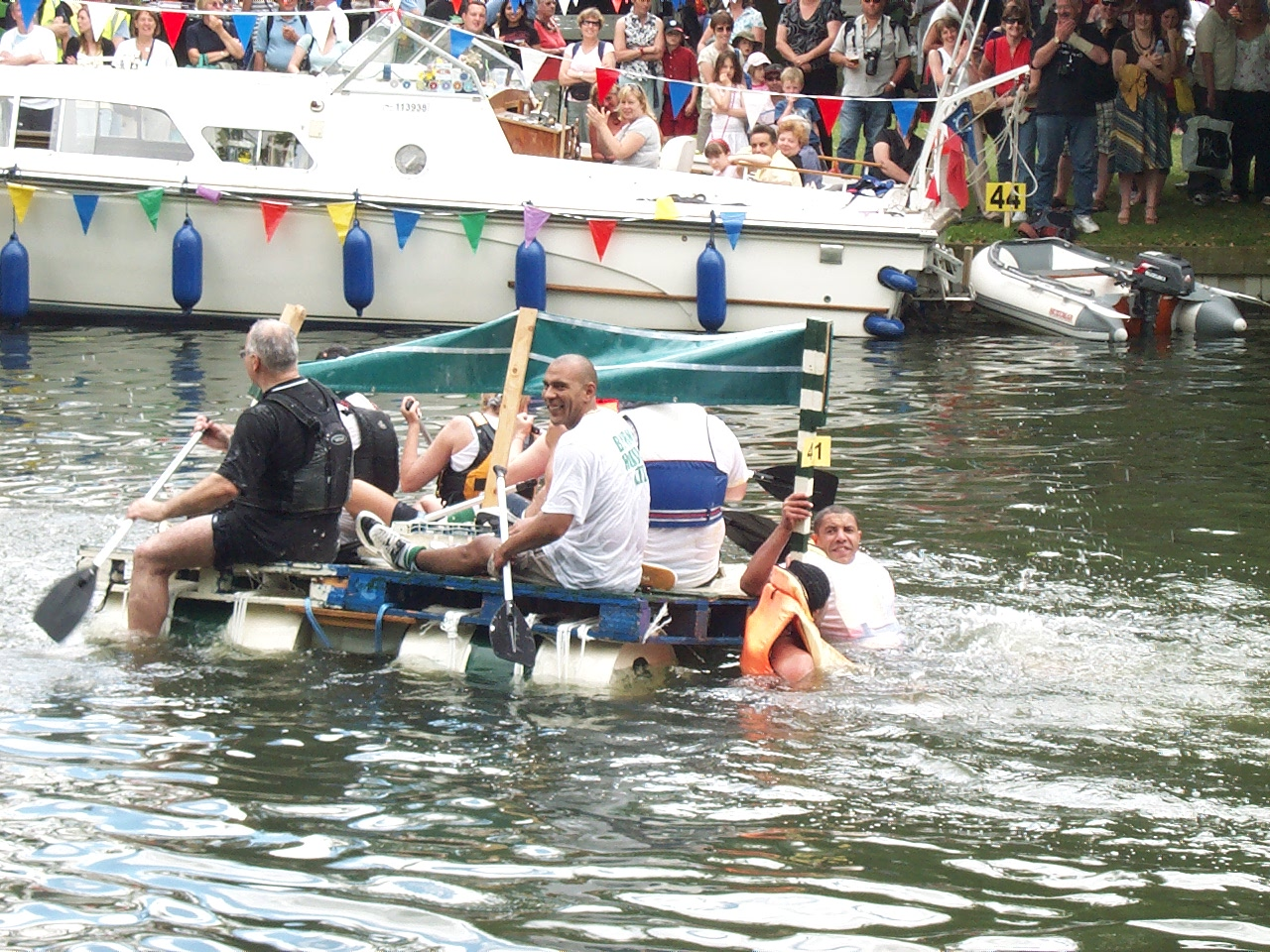
Participants in a raft race - 2008 festival

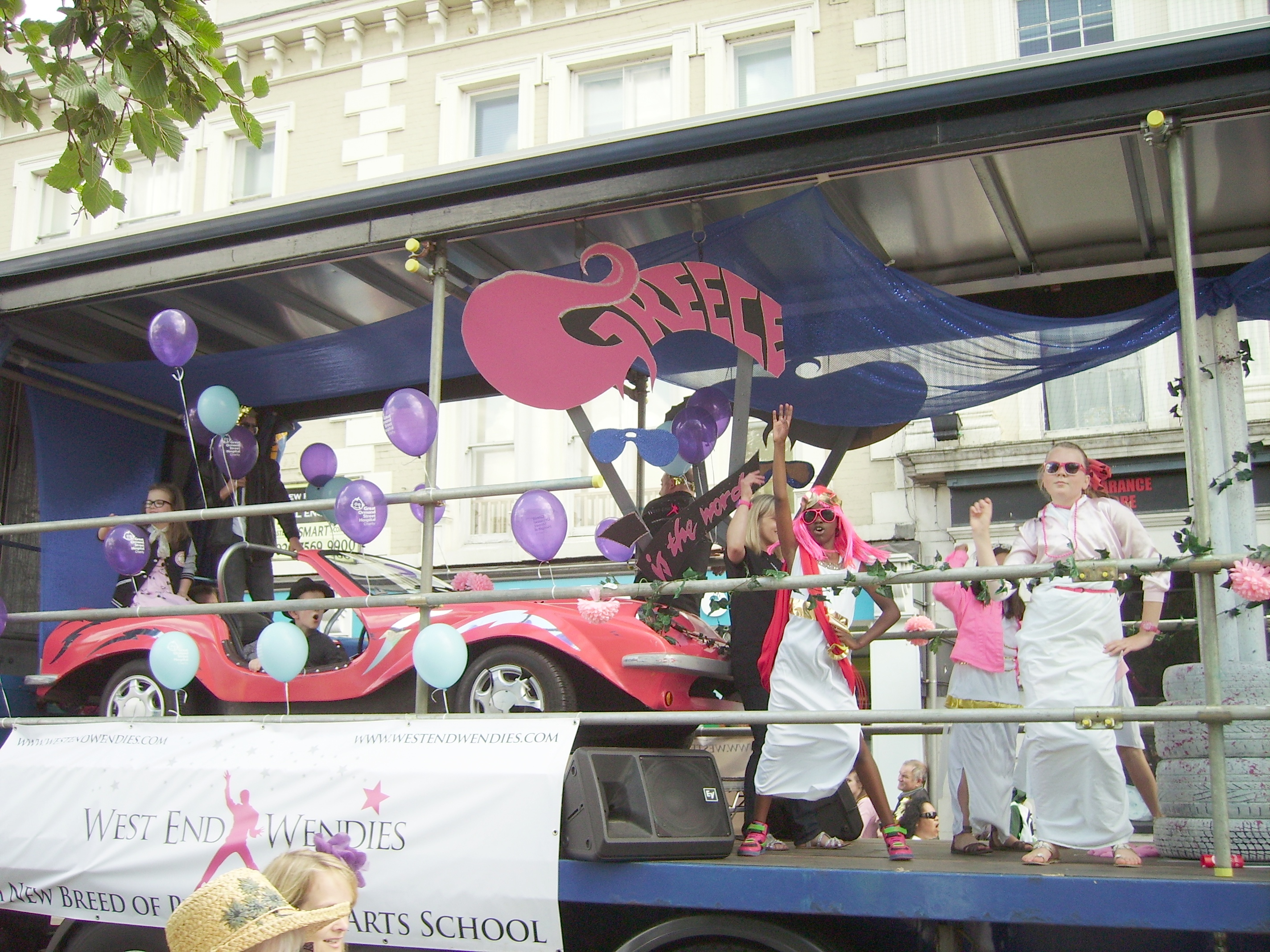
Float in the parade - 2010 festival

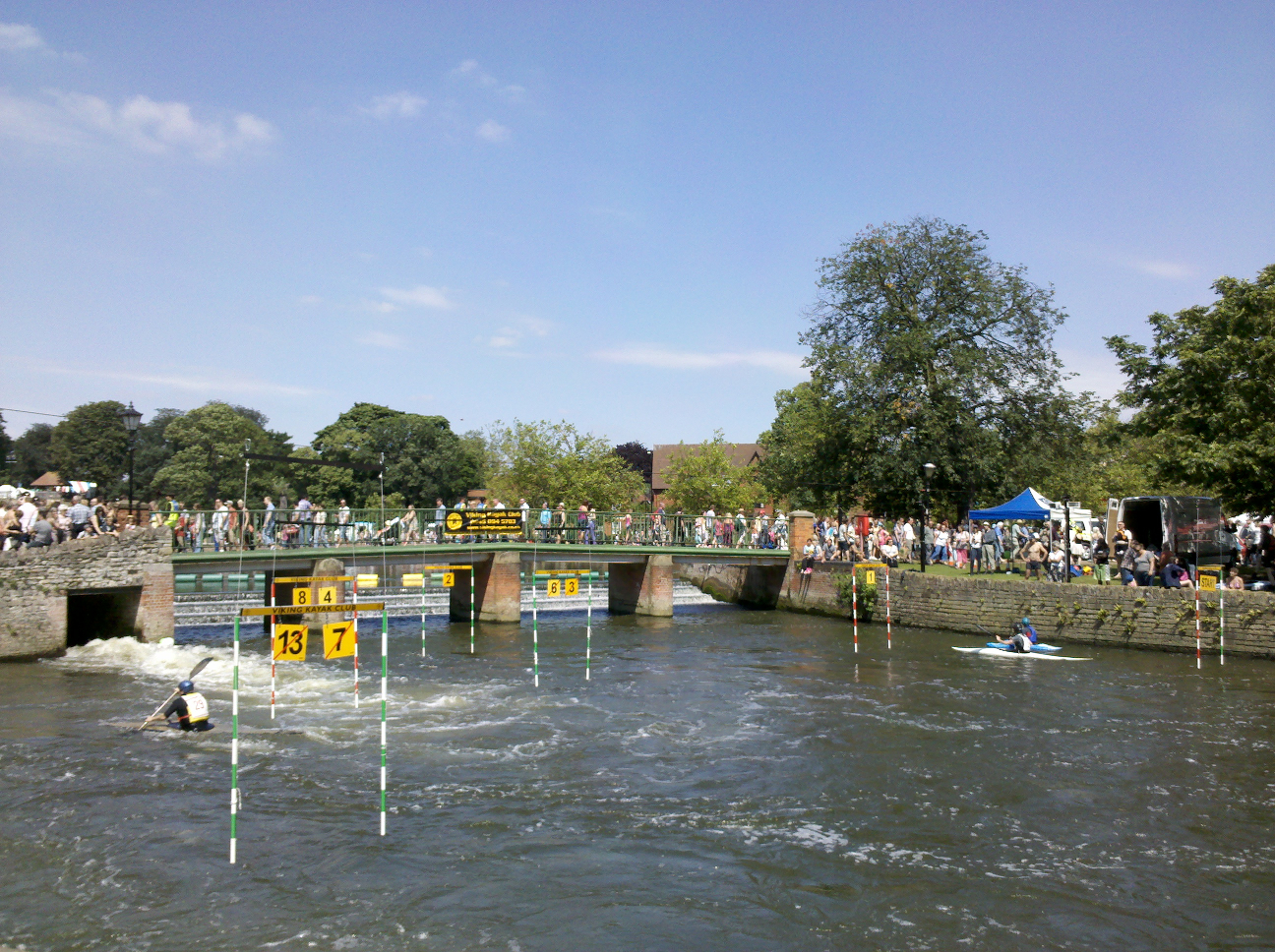
Canoes on the river - 2012 festival

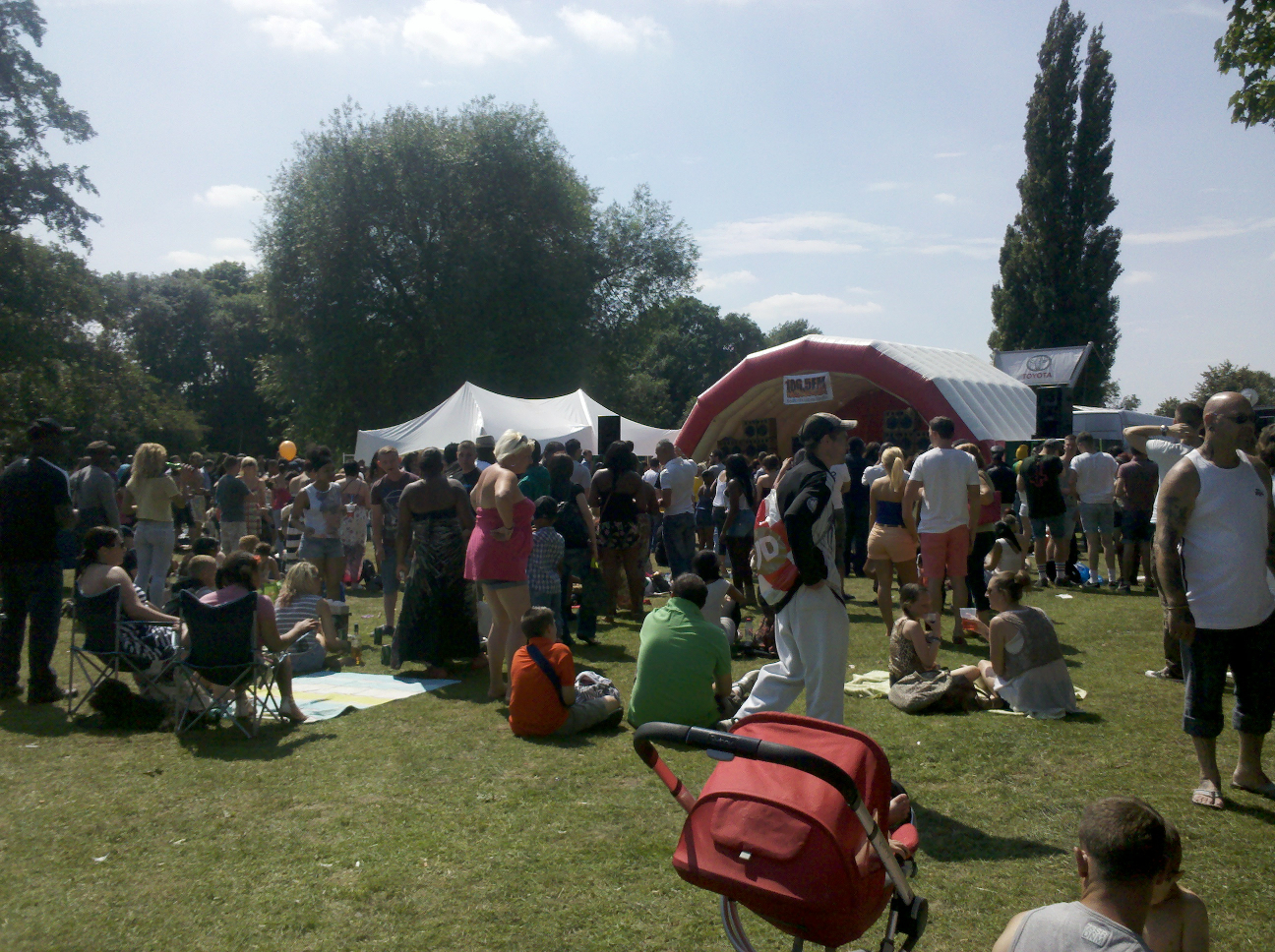
In2beats radio stage - 2012 festival

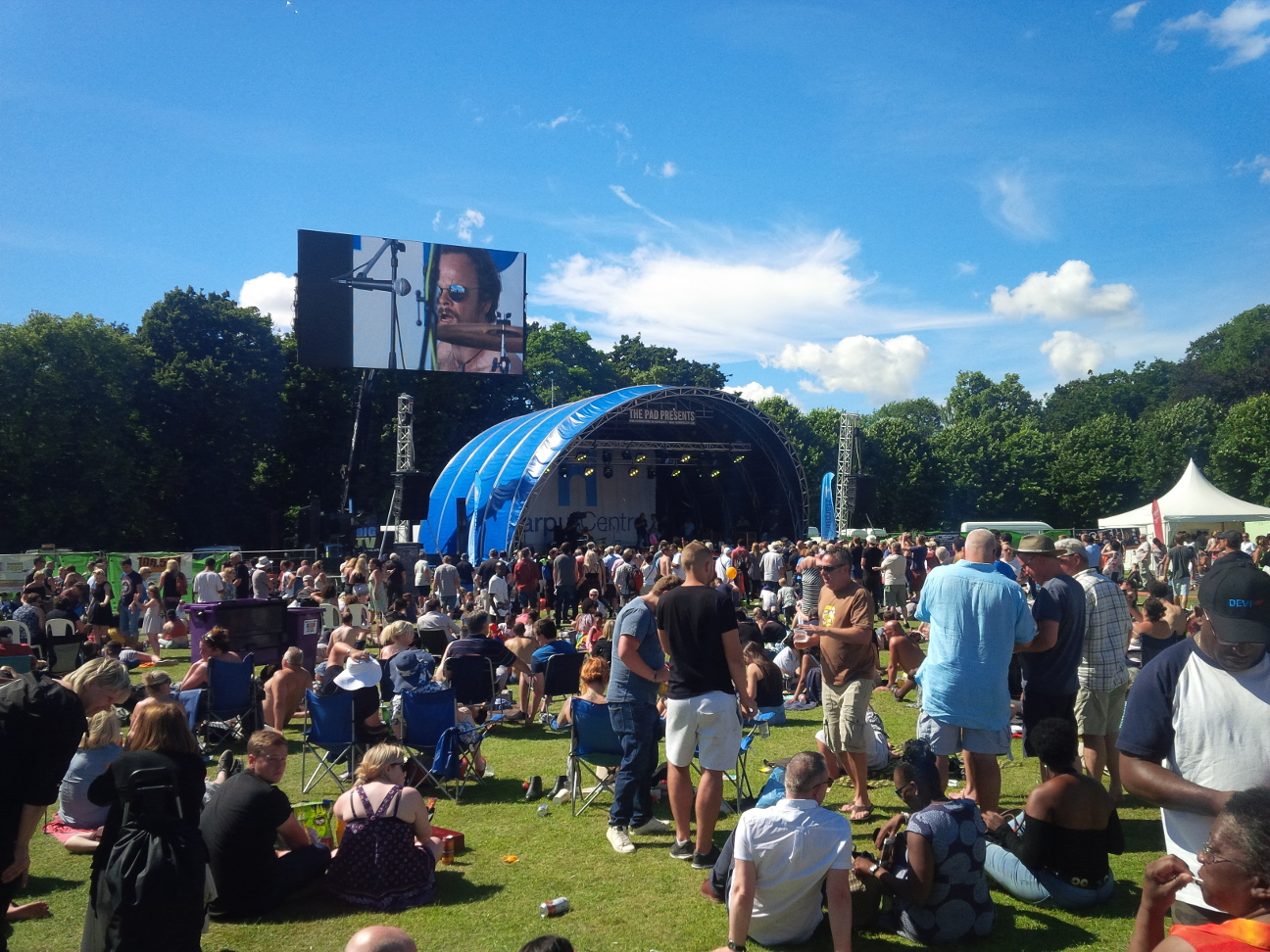
The main stage - 2014 festival

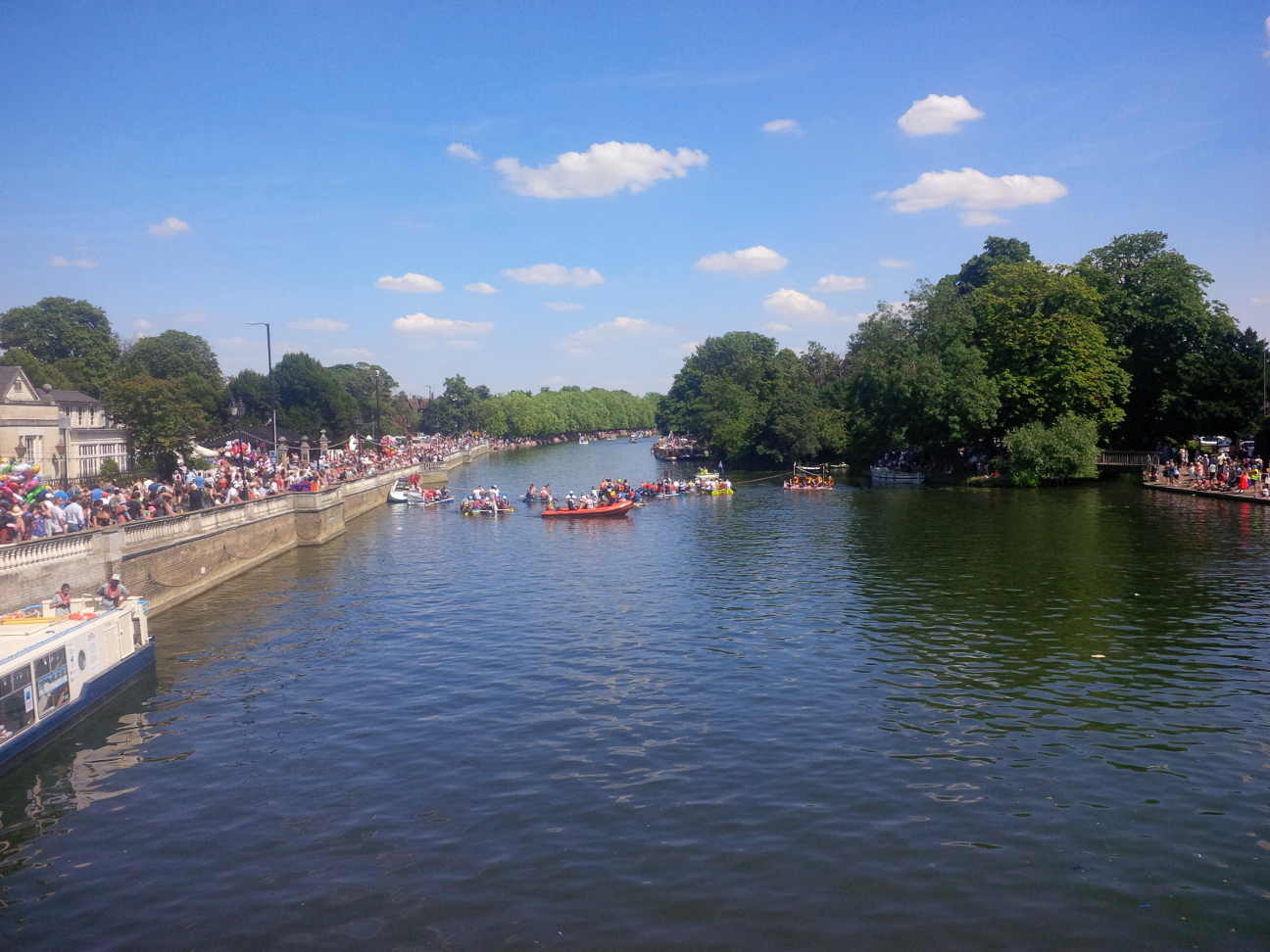
View of the embankment - 2016 festival
