= Wimborne Minster Folk Festival =

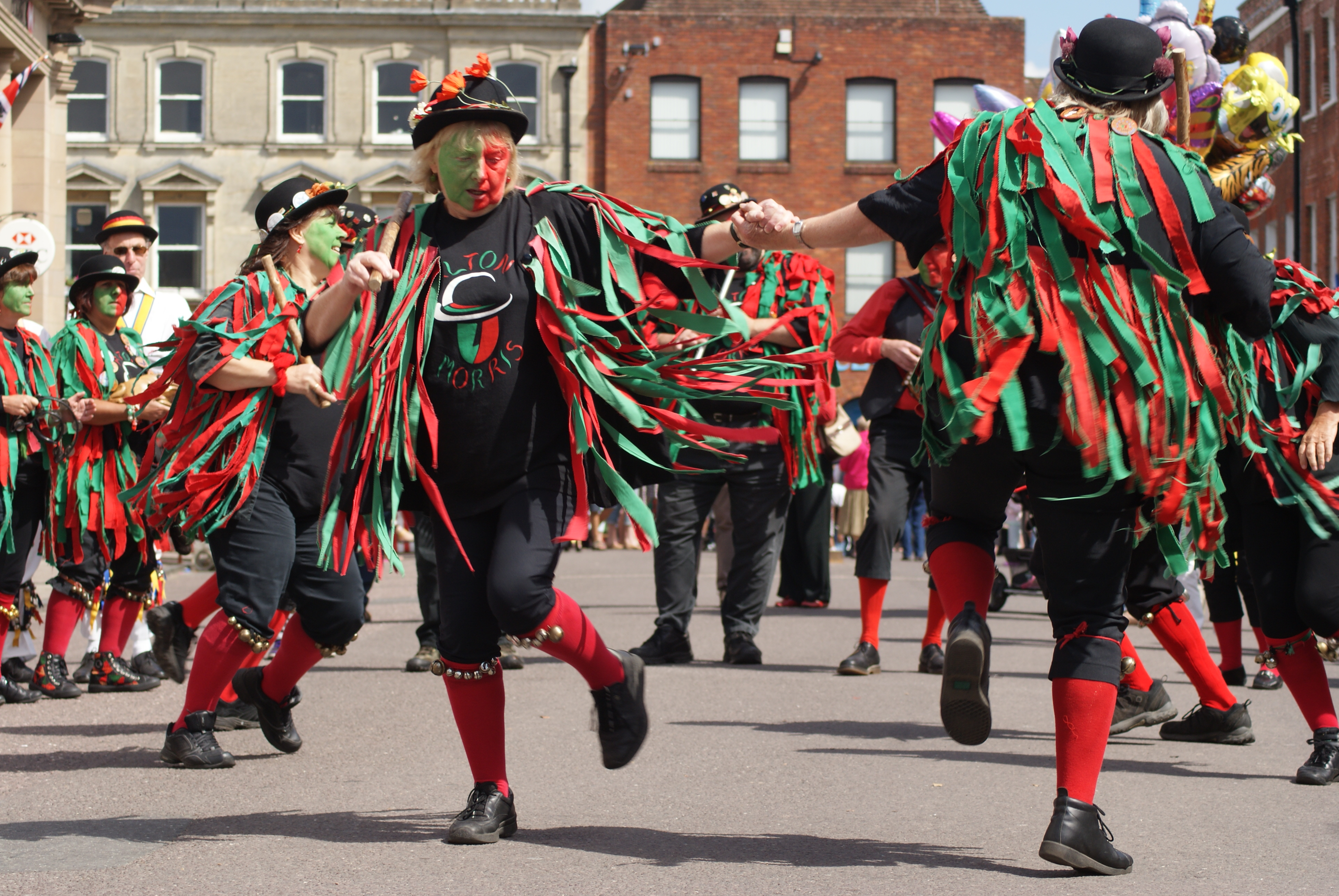
- Alton Morris at Wimborne Folk Festival 2011
- Genre: Folk music, folk dance
- Frequency: Annually in June
- Locations: Wimborne Minster, England
- Inaugurated: 1979/1982
- Attendance: Up to 70,000
- Website: wmff.co.uk

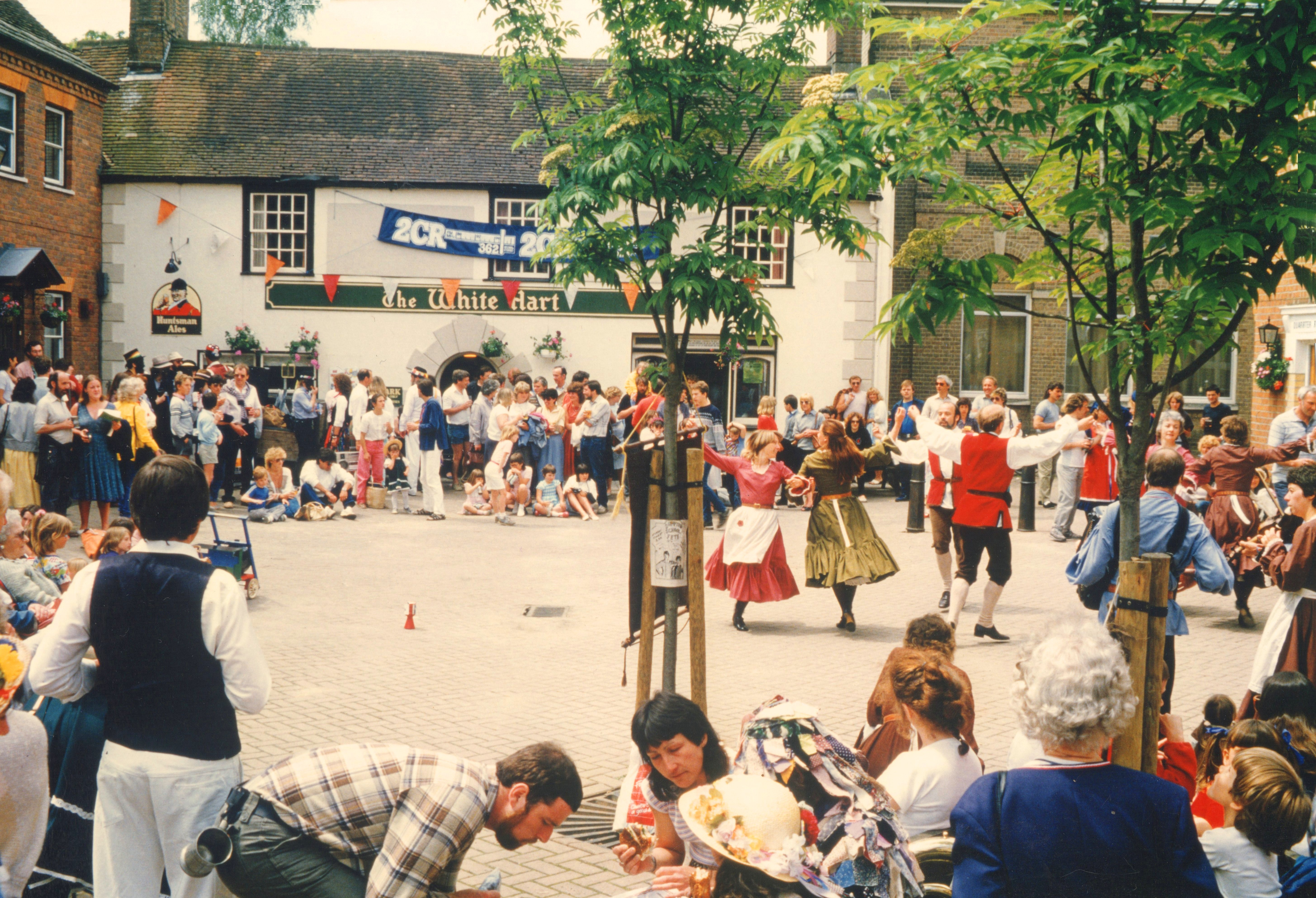
Festival attendees outside the White Hart Hotel, Wimborne Minster, Dorset, during the 1985 Wimborne Folk Festival

Wimborne Minster Folk Festival took over from the previously known Wimborne Folk Festival in 2013 when the previous organisers retired in August 2012, after over 30 years organising the festival. The annual festival is still internationally recognised for its traditional English folk music and dance, held in the market town of Wimborne Minster, Dorset, England.

== History ==
The original festival was founded in 1979/82 (see below) as a traditional festival of folk dance and music. It began as a one-day event, but quickly grew to become a weekend-long festival, held annually over Friday, Saturday and Sunday of the second weekend in June. It is still one of the largest gathering of dance teams and musicians in the South of England, attracting an audience of up to 70,000 people. Several streets near the ancient Wimborne Minster are closed during the Festival. Attractions include concerts, ceilidhs, workshops, dance displays, street markets and family areas.

The climactic scenes of the 2009 film Morris: A Life with Bells On, a mockumentary about morris dancing, were filmed at the festival.

On 19 August 2012, it was announced on the official Wimborne Folk Festival website that, due to a lack of financial support, the 2012 festival that was held in June, would be the last.

In September 2012, a small group of volunteers took the challenge of continuing the festival for 2013 and future years. With the change of organisers, the festival name was changed to Wimborne Minster Folk Festival following the request from the previous organisers.

The new festival has been a huge success each year under new organisation and has kept the festival legacy alive.

2017 saw a substantial change of leadership, under which the festival continued to grow and expand its vision, including opening proceedings with a night of music and comedy, fed by the "Laugh Out Loud" comedy competition.

In 2018, there were over 60 dance teams attending and it is estimated that 70,000 people came into Wimborne for the festival. Through a number of committee changes, the festival still continues to grow thanks to the hard work of volunteers, the support of local businesses, councils and our audience.

The Festival planned for 2020 did not go ahead, due to the health precautions imposed in response to the COVID-19 pandemic, whereby public gatherings were severely restricted or banned altogether. Instead, with the cooperation of local businesses and Wimborne Minster Town Council, the Folk Festival committee made use of Café @ The Allendale - the Festival's café facilities at Allendale Community Centre, a local community hub, which the Folk Festival had taken over early in 2020, shortly before the pandemic hit the UK. Temporarily rebranded as a "Food Facility", the Café provided food and meals for those in difficulties, e.g. as a result of having to self-isolate or not being able to work during the lockdowns, carrying on throughout 2020 from the first lockdown in March, and into 2021 as restrictions continued to keep some people out of work and vulnerable people unable to leave their homes.

An attempt was made to reschedule the 2020 Festival to August, in the hope that as much as possible of the event could still go ahead, but this too had to be cancelled as the need to protect public health continued to dominate life in the UK. Meanwhile Café @ The Allendale kept the Folk Festival spirit alive in the second half of 2020 by hosting small, socially distanced afternoon and evening gigs featuring local musicians, as and when public health regulations permitted.

In June 2021, the same weekend as the festival would have taken place, an online event was held over 2 nights, featuring local acts.

The festival is scheduled to return in 2022 with an enlarged event to celebrate its 40th anniversary. Art is also to be added to the agenda joining comedy (added in 2019) as new disciplines for the public to enjoy.

== Dates ==
1979 – Saturday 18 August – One day, one off event called "Wimborne Country Festival"

1980/81 - No events

1982 – "Wimborne Country Folk Festival" 11–13 June.

Since then it has taken place every year.

1984 – a press report refers to this being the 3rd year (making 1982 the first)

1992 - a press interview with Brian Bisp refers to this being the 11th year (also making 1982 the first)

2010 - held from 11 to 13 June 2010, attracted 45 dance sides and an estimated crowd of 20,000 people.

The 2019 Festival was from 6 to 9 June 2019.

2020 - cancelled due to the COVID-19 pandemic.
