= Stockton International Riverside Festival =

- Genre: Arts festival
- Begins: 1 August 2025
- Ends: 3 August 2025
- Frequency: Annually
- Location: Stockton-on-Tees
- Years active: 40
- Inaugurated: 1988
- Most recent: 2025
- Website: http://www.sirf.co.uk/

The Stockton International Riverside Festival (SIRF) is an annual outdoor arts festival in Stockton-on-Tees, England. It includes British and international performers. The most recent event took place between 1-3 August 2025, with the next event taking place in 2026.

== History ==
The first Stockton Riverside Festival was founded by Frank Wilson and the first festival took place in August 1988. Now known as the Stockton International Riverside Festival, it has grown into an internationally famous event that attracts thousands of spectators. In 2015, the founder, Frank Wilson, was awarded an MBE for his services to the festival arts in the North East, recognising the impact the festival had made to Stockton. In 2017, SIRF celebrated its 30th anniversary.

=== Stockton Riverside Fringe Festival ===
In 1991, local musicians collaborated to start the Stockton Riverside Fringe Festival as a companion event to SIRF. It grew from a small, free, one-stage, one-day fringe event that was intended to showcase local talent to become, by its tenth festival in 2010, a multi-stage, paid for event headlined by as Calvin Harris. From 2011 onwards, it was produced by the Tees Music Alliance in collaboration with Stockton Borough Council and it was renamed the Stockton Weekender. It was headlined by Maxïmo Park in 2011, The Pogues in 2012, Primal Scream in 2013 and by Public Enemy in 2014, which would be its last year. Following the festival, Tees Music Alliance announced that it would no longer be organising the festival as it had failed to sell enough tickets to cover its costs and considered it to no longer be financially viable.

== Festival Programme ==
Since the mid-1990s, SIRF has been regularly funded by Stockton Borough Council, and since 2012 the council has received National Portfolio Organisation funding from Arts Council England to the value of approximately £200,000 per annum. The Festival Programme is delivered by a dedicated team employed by the local authority.

=== Festival Directors ===
Director	Years active	Notes
Frank Wilson MBE	1988–2012	Frank was the founding artistic director of the festival and he stepped down in 2012.
Jan Doherty	2012–2018	Jan started working on the festival in 2005 and succeeded Frank in 2012.
Jeremy Shine	2019–Present	Jeremy was appointed in 2018 to succeed Jan Doherty.

=== Community Carnival Programme ===
The SIRF community carnival programme commissions artists to engage with local schools and community groups supporting them to create costumes, carnival structures, music and performances, interpreting an annually agreed theme, which then become a vibrant and colourful procession through the centre of Stockton starting at noon on the Saturday afternoon. By the 2016 festival, this had grown to 1,211 participants, spread over 49 different community groups. Previous carnival themes have included:

Year	Theme	Notes
2004	Crinolines In The Jungle	
2015	Instant Light	Inspired by the Stockton born John Walker inventor of the friction match.
2016	Mythical Lands and Fantastical Creatures	A theme to explore myths and tales of weird and wonderful places throughout history.
2018	Fizz, Bang, Pop	A birthday theme for the 30th anniversary.
2019	Tales of the Tees Valley	Part of the Great Place programme designed to celebrate the Tees Valley.
