= List of music festivals in the United Kingdom =

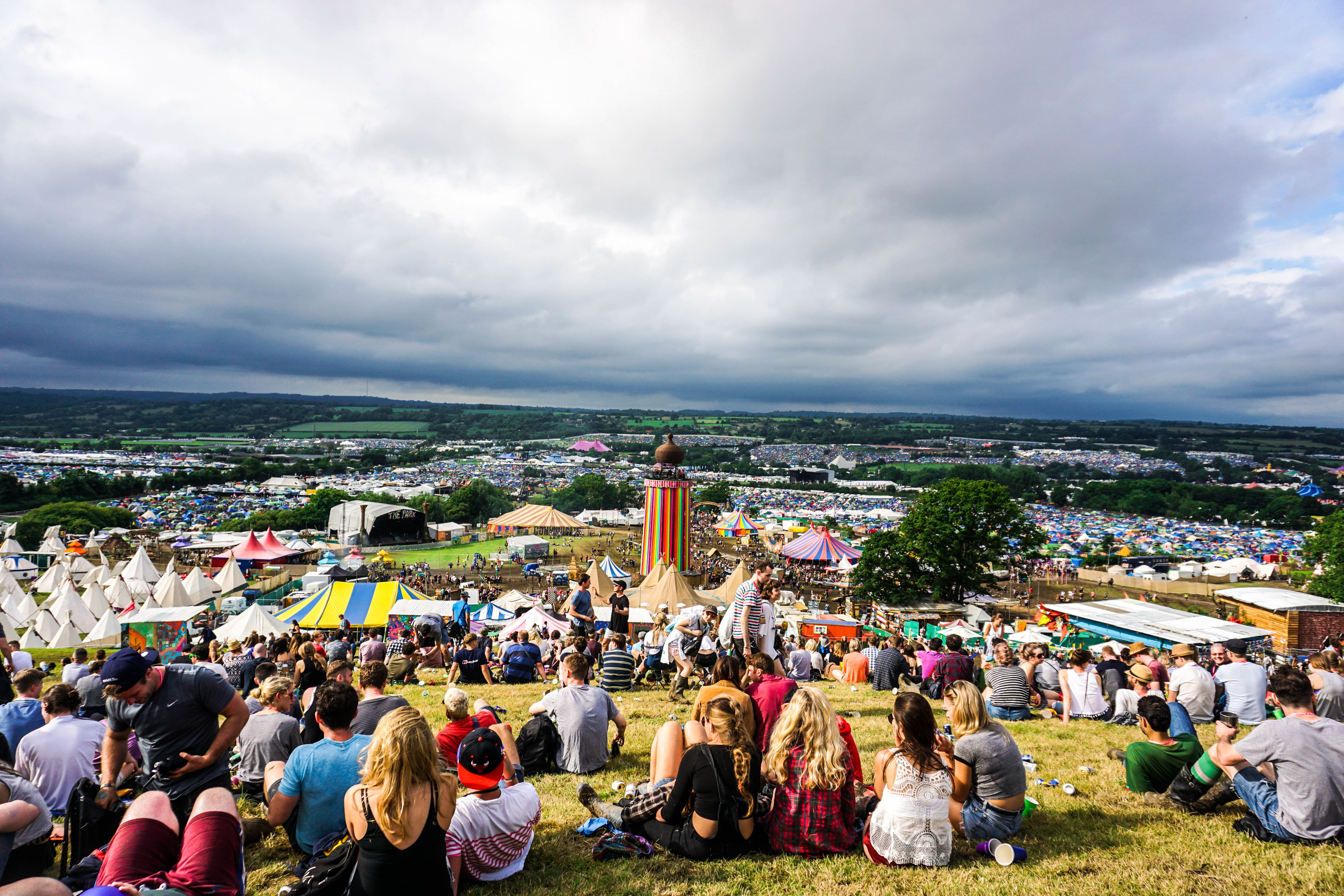
Glastonbury Festival, England, 2016

There are many notable music festivals in the United Kingdom, covering a wide variety of genres, which are usually run from late May to early September. Some are world-renowned and have been held for many years, including the world's largest greenfield festival, Glastonbury, which has been held since the 1970s.

== History ==
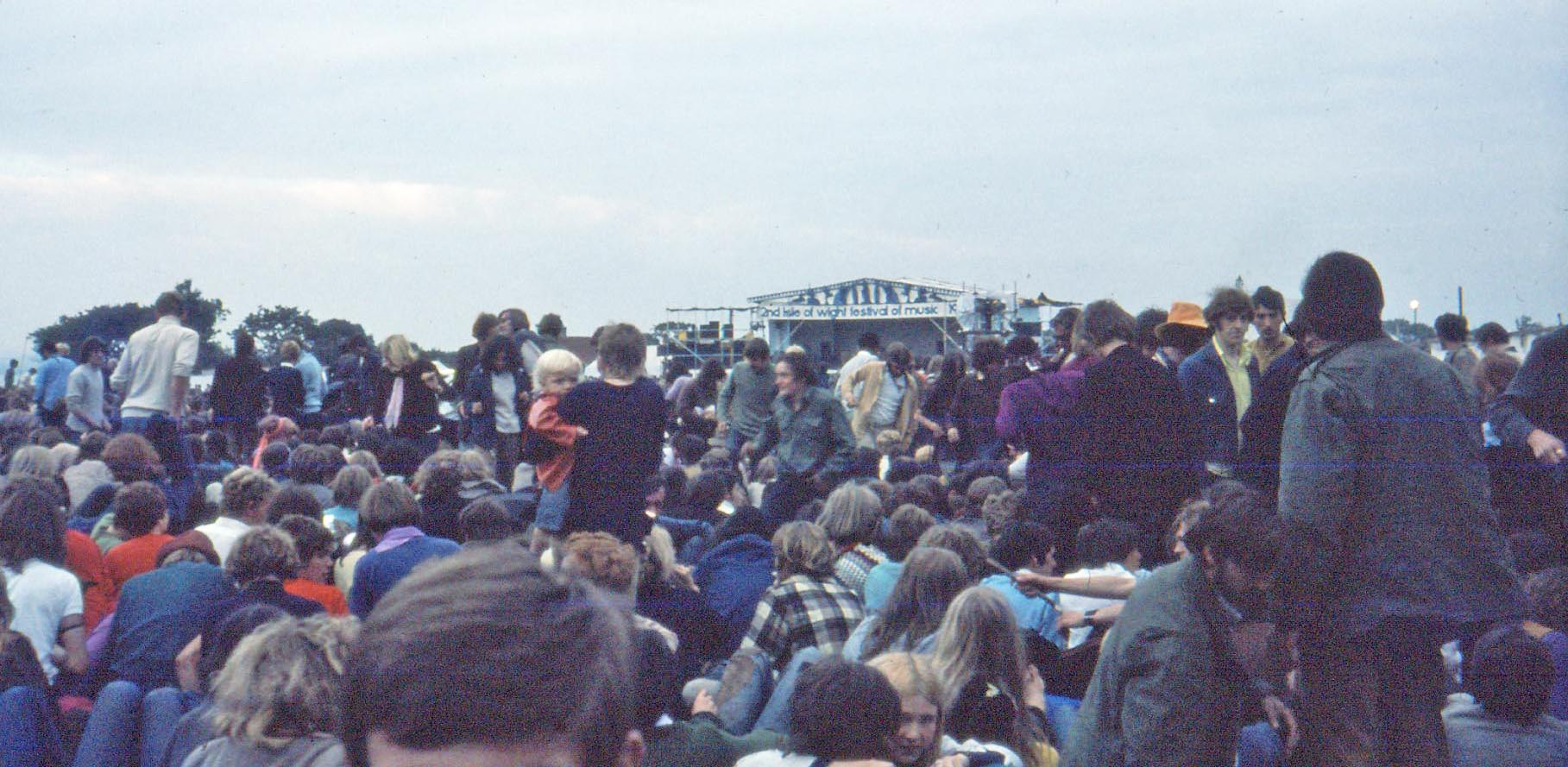
Isle of Wight Festival 1969

Large-scale modern music festivals began in the 1960s with festivals such as the Isle of Wight Festival and following the success of Woodstock in the United States and free festivals. Some began as jazz festivals such as the Reading Festival which began as the National Jazz and Blues Festival in the 1960s and the first Glastonbury Festival was the 1970 Pilton Pop, Blues & Folk Festival.

== Events ==
=== Bluegrass ===
- Didmarton Bluegrass Festival

=== Classical and opera ===
- Aldeburgh Festival
- BBC Cardiff Singer of the World
- Buxton Festival
- Cheltenham Music Festival
- Cymanfa Ganu
- East Neuk Festival
- Edinburgh International Festival
- Garsington Opera
- Glyndebourne Opera Festival
- Grange Park Opera
- Grimeborn
- Harrogate International Festivals
- Huddersfield Contemporary Music Festival
- Kala Festival
- Llangollen International Musical Eisteddfod
- Lake District Summer Music
- London International Festival of Early Music
- Nevill Holt Opera
- Oxford Lieder Festival
- The Proms
- Prom on The Close
- Spitalfields Music
- St Albans International Organ Festival
- St Magnus Festival
- Southern Cathedrals Festival
- Swaledale Festival
- Tenby International Music Festival
- Three Choirs Festival
- Two Moors Festival
- York Early Music Festival

=== Country ===
- C2C: Country to Country
- Highways Festival
- The Long Road

=== Dance and Electronic ===
- Bang Face
- Beat-Herder
- Bloc Festival
- Boundary Festival
- Chilled in a Field Festival
- Creamfields
- Doof in the Park
- Glade Festival
- Infest UK
- Live at Loch Lomond
- PlanetLove
- Play Fest
- Shambala Festival
- Lost Village Festival
- We Out Here Festival

=== Ethnic ===
- Africa Oyé
- Bradford Mela
- Cardiff Mela
- Edinburgh Mela

=== Folk ===
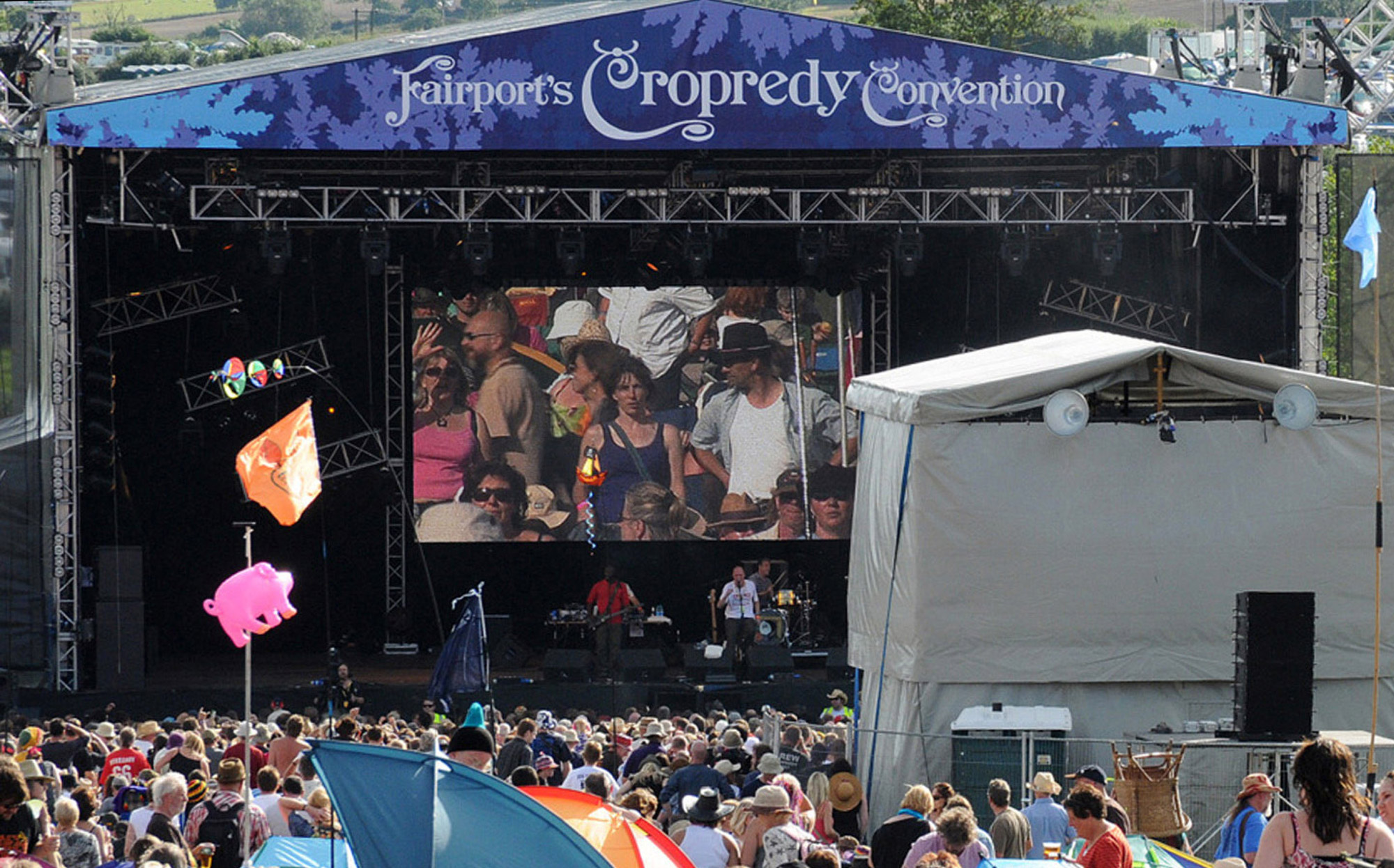
The stage at Fairport's Cropredy Convention festival, Oxfordshire, in August 2009

- Beverley Folk Festival
- Big Burns Supper Festival
- BunkFest
- Cambridge Folk Festival
- Celtic Connections
- Cropredy Festival
- Folk East
- Hop Farm Festival (inactive)
- International Eisteddfod
- IVFDF
- Middlewich Folk And Boat Festival
- Moseley Folk and Arts Festival
- Royal National Mòd
- Shrewsbury Folk Festival
- Sidmouth Folk Festival
- Soma Festival, Castlewellan
- Towersey Festival
- Trowbridge Village Pump Festival
- Glasgow West End Festival
- Wickham Festival

=== Jazz ===
- Brecon Jazz Festival
- Cheltenham Jazz Festival
- City of Derry Jazz and Big Band Festival
- Glasgow Jazz Festival
- Glenn Miller Festival
- London Jazz Festival
- Love Supreme Jazz Festival
- Manchester Jazz Festival
- Mostly Jazz Funk & Soul Festival
- We Out Here Festival

=== Metal ===
- Bloodstock Open Air
- Damnation Festival
- Deathfest
- Download Festival
- Hammerfest
- Hammerdown Festival
- Hard Rock Hell
- Hellfire Festival
- In-Fest
- Ozzfest
- ProgPower UK
- Sonisphere Festival

=== Pop ===
- Guernsey Festival Of Performing Arts
- Henley Festival
- Jack Up The Summer Festival
- Jersey Live
- Jingle Bell Ball
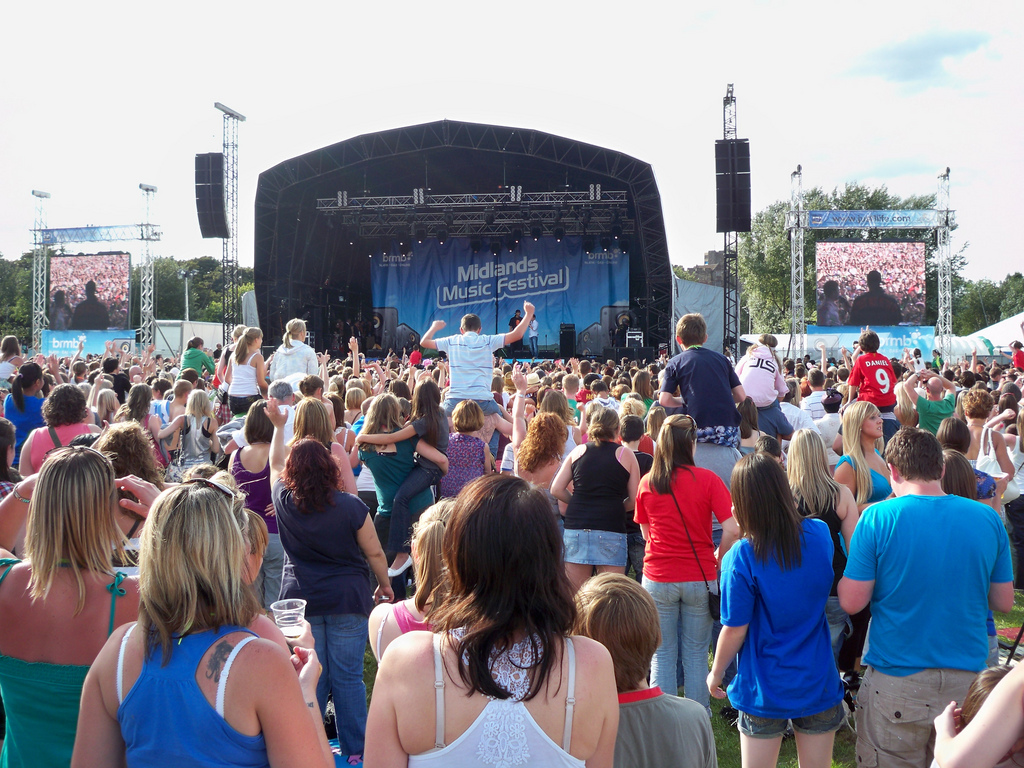
  The stage at the 2010 Midlands Music Festival
- Midlands Music Festival
- Mighty Hoopla
- Osfest
- Party in the Park
- Summertime Ball
- T4 on the Beach

=== Punk ===
- Common Ground Festival
- Give it a Name Festival
- Outbreak Festival
- Rebellion Festival
- Slam Dunk Festival

=== Rock ===
The Main Stage at the 2006 Reading Festival

- 2000 Trees Festival
- ArcTanGent Festival
- Boardmasters
- Bourne Festival
- Damnation Festival
- Download Festival
- Forfey Festival
- Headlander Festival
- Hevy Music Festival
- High Voltage Festival
- Isle of Wight Festival
- Jersey Live
- Marvellous Festivals
- Play Fest
- Projekt Revolution
- Ramblin' Man Fair
- Sonisphere Festival
- Stamford Festival
- Steelhouse Festival
- Summer Sundae
- TRNSMT
- Tennents ViTal
- Uxfest
- Whitby Gothic Weekend
- Walk the Line Festival

=== Tribute act festivals ===
- Glastonbudget
- Marvellous Festivals

=== Cross-genre ===
- Lytham Festival
- 110 Above Festival (formerly Lainfest)
- 2000trees Festival
- All Tomorrow's Parties
- All Points East
- ArcTanGent Festival
- ArtsFest (inactive)
- BBC Radio 1's Big Weekend (Traveling)
- Bearded Theory Festival
- Beautiful Days
- Beggars Fair
- Bestival (inactive)
- Big in Falkirk (inactive)
- Blissfields
- Bludfest
- Boardmasters
- The Bollington Festival
- Boomtown
- Brentwood Festival
- British Summer Time
- Brownstock Festival
- Camp Bestival
- Cardiff Big Weekend
- Celtic Blue Rock Community Arts Festival
- City of London Festival
- Clarence Park Festival
- Devauden Festival
- Electric Bay Festival
- End of the Road Festival
- Equinox Festival
- Evolution Emerging
- Evolution Festival
- Fairport's Cropredy Convention
- Farmfestival
- Festival Too
- Field Day
- Forest Tour
- Fusion Festival
- Garforth Arts Festival
- Glastonbury Festival
- Godiva Festival
- Good Vibrations Society
- The Great Escape Festival
- Greenbelt festival
- Green Man Festival
- Guilfest
- Hampton Court Palace Festival
- Hastings Musical Festival
- HowTheLightGetsIn
- Isle of Wight Festival
- Kendal Calling
- Kernowfornia Festival
- Killin Music Festival
- Knebworth Festival
- Knockengorroch Festival
- Larmer Tree Festival
- Latitude Festival
- LeeStock Music Festival
- Let's Rock
- Limetree Festival
- Lindisfarne Festival
- Mathew Street Fringe Festival
- Looe Music Festival
- Loopallu Festival
- Lounge On The Farm (inactive)
- The Magic Loungeabout (inactive)
- Marvellous Festivals
- Meltdown
- Monmouth Music Festival
- Montrose Music Festival
- Morvala Festival of Arts
- Norfolk and Norwich Festival
- Nozstock
- Offset Festival
- Outbreak Festival
- Outlines Festival
- The Outsider Festival (inactive)
- Oxjam
- Parklife
- Phoenix Festival (inactive)
- Play Fest
- Reading and Leeds Festivals
- Redfest
- Rewind Festival
- Rhythm Festival (inactive)
- Rise Festival (inactive)
- Rock Oyster
- RockNess (inactive)
- Rotherham Real Ale and Music Festival
- Scarborough Fair Festival
- St. Magnus International Festival
- Stamford Riverside Festival
- Strawberry Fair
- Seahouses Festival
- Secret Garden Party
- Sesiwn Fawr Dolgellau
- Sheep Music
- Shifnal Festival
- Skye Music Festival (inactive)
- Solfest
- Splendour in Nottingham
- Standon Calling
- Stendhal Festival
- Sunrise Celebration
- Supersonic Festival
- Sŵn Festival
- T in the Park
- Tartan Heart Festival
- Tafwyl
- Tramlines Festival
- Truck Festival
- Twinwood Festival
- Underage Festival (inactive)
- V Festival
- Vale Festival
- Victorious Festival
- Wakestock
- Walk the Line Festival
- We Out Here Festival
- Weyfest
- Whitwell Music Festival
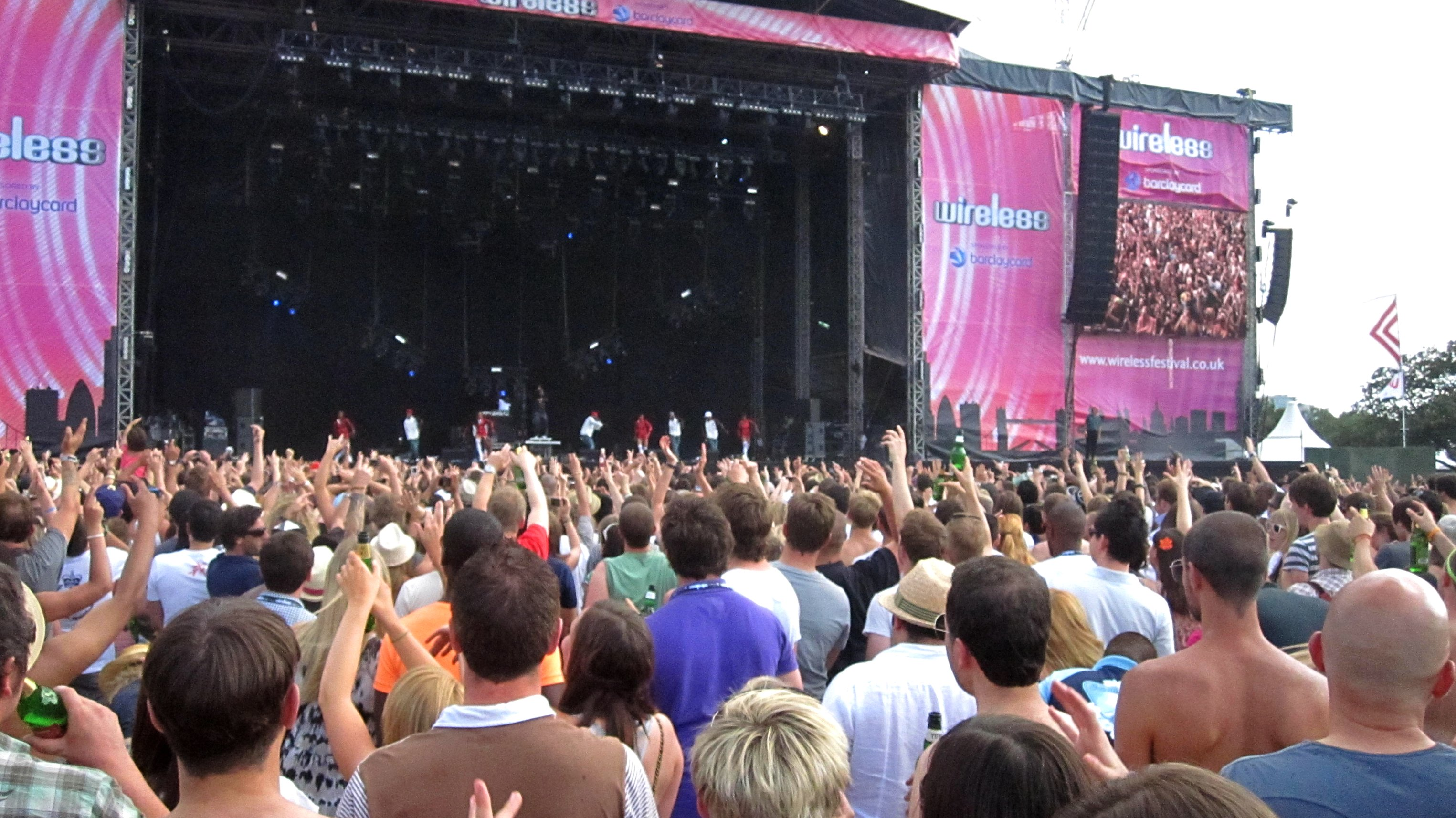
  The stage at the 2010 Wireless Festival
- Wickerman Festival (inactive)
- Wickham Festival
- Wireless Festival
- WOMAD
- Worcester Music Festival
- Wychwood Music Festival
- Y Not Festival
- Young London into Music

== See also ==
- List of festivals in the United Kingdom

== Bibliography ==
- Andrew Blake (1997). The Land Without Music: Music, Culture and Society in Twentieth Century Britain. Manchester: Manchester University Press. ISBN 978-0719042997.
- George McKay (2000). Glastonbury: A Very English Fair, inc. chapter one "Histories of festival culture", also "Timeline of British pop festival culture". London: Victor Gollancz. ISBN 0-575-06807-8.
- George McKay (2005). Circular Breathing: The Cultural Politics of Jazz in Britain, chapter one "New Orleans jazz, protest (Aldermaston) and carnival (Beaulieu [Jazz Festival 1956–60])". Durham NC: Duke University Press. ISBN 0-8223-3573-5.
