= Blue Rock =

Blue Rock may refer to:

- Blue Rock, Ohio, United States
- Blue Rock Records, a subsidiary of Mercury Records
- Celtic Blue Rock Community Arts Festival, a charity-based festival
- Blue Rock (album), by The Cross
- Blues rock, a form of rock music

== See also ==
- Blue Rock Creek, a stream in Ohio
- Blue Rock Springs Creek
- Blue Rock State Park
- Blue Rock Studio in New York City
- Blue rock thrush, a species of chat
- Blue Rock Township
- Blue Rocks (disambiguation)
