= Stamford Riverside Festival =

Music festival in Stamford, England

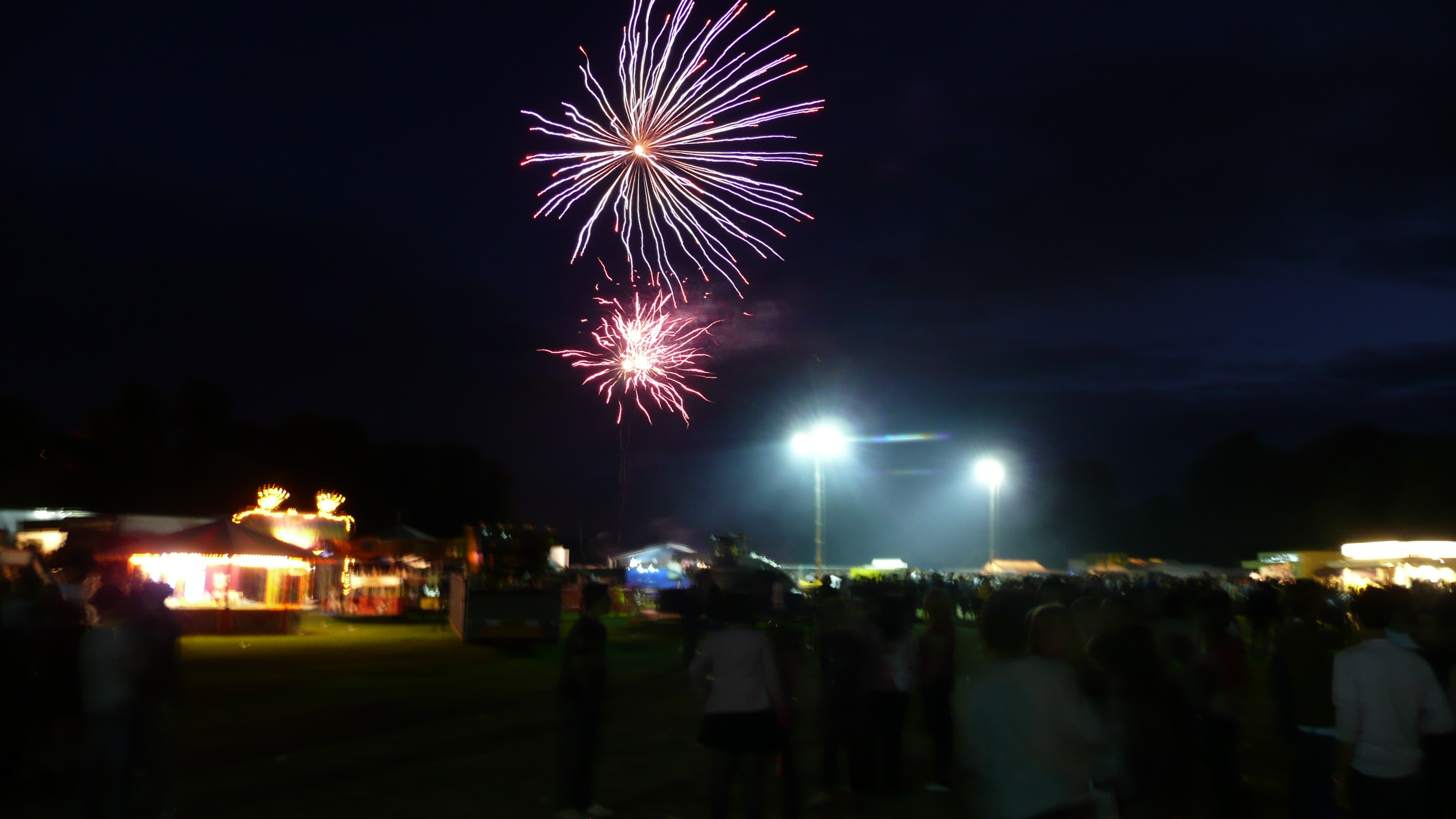
- Fireworks at the 2008 festival
- Genre: Rock, Punk, Indie, Acoustic, Dance
- Dates: July
- Locations: Stamford, Lincolnshire, England
- Years active: 2001-2010
- Website: Riversidefestival.co.uk

Stamford Riverside Festival was an annual music festival in Stamford, Lincolnshire, England. It was held for over 10 years, with previous event names being 'Rock on the Rec', 'Rock on the Meadows' and 'Music on the Meadows'.

== About ==
The festival was held on the riverside meadows of the River Welland for 10 years from 2001 to 2010. Previously the event had run occasionally as Rock on the Meadows and Music on the Meadows (the first event was in 1980), while another iteration was called Rock on the Rec, which was held on Stamford's Recreation Ground - the first Rock on the Rec took place on 30 June 1990 and was headlined by the Dancing Wu Li Masters. The latter still continues as an annual event organised in association with the Stamford Lions.

The free not-for-profit event was run by the Riverside Association of Music & Arts (RAMA), which was a registered charity set up to run the event. The organisers worked closely with Stamford Town Council, who own the site, and South Kesteven District Council.

The festival principally provided for a range of music genres on a variety of stages, including rock and acoustic, Punk, Indie, Acoustic and later on, Dance, and featured artists such as Midget, Enter Shikari, Hazel O'Connor and The Levellers.

The capacity of the event grew from around 3,000 to up to 15,000 by 2010, attracting people from across the East Midlands. The 2012 festival, which was to be the first ticketed event, had to be cancelled just before the date due to a waterlogged site.

== Origins & Aims ==
The festival was inspired by the Strawberry Fair free festival held annually in Cambridge - one of the organisers, Martin Smith, had previously worked on the Strawberry Fair committee, running a stage for students at Cambridge Regional College. Smith also had experience of music promotion via Global and Big Bubble, a partnership with Steve Andrews, which promoted bands at Quayhole Kates in Stamford (including Back to the Planet, Radical Dance Faction and Bushfire) and at The Shamrock in Peterborough (including The Verve and Ride).

The aim was to create a free open-access music and arts event as part of the annual Stamford Festival to include 'a diverse range of musical entertainment, arts and children's activities'. The aim was to primarily promote new and original music, but occasionally feature a tribute act.

== Riverside Festival 1 - Saturday 30th June 2001 ==
The first festival featured 40 musical artists performing on 3 stages, with a workshop marquee for kids activities, a beer and cider festival, fairground rides from Ted Taylor's Amusements, a variety of stalls and a firework finale. The organising committee was Richard Clark, Darren Cummings, Sarah Minty, Simon Robinson and Martin Smith. A printed colour programme, which can be viewed here:, was produced, designed by Martin Smith, and these continued through subsequent events.

The festival's main stage, called Riverside Stage, was an open-air arena at the far end of the site across the entrance to the 2nd meadow. This stage's aim was to host a diverse range of quality acts and the running order was Dan Britton, Take Six, Vikki Clayton & Friends, Analyze, Tunguska Butterfly, Buried Trevor, Skinny Sumo, Michael Jackson Smith, Amelia, Funkmaster Wu Li, an offshoot from the Dancing Wu Li Masters, Kissmet and Are You Experienced?, a Hendrix tribute.

The Marquee Stage was a 140' x 40' covered arena in the centre of the site which specialised in rock and indie music. The line up was Millichip's Locker, Dr Rich Prescribes, Upshot, Junk Puppets, The Contrast, The Hounddogs, Manzerik, Chekira, Mondo, Midget, Sckism and March to the Grave.

The Acoustic/Dance Stage featured singer/songwriters, folk and world music, with dance music in the evening, and was a marquee located at the point of the meadows towards the Town Bridge. The line up was Dominic & Manish, Sheenagh, Pete Finlay, Aware, [ Dick Appleton, Chris Laverick, Galen, Beatkeepers, Herbie Lamb Quartet, Woven Chords and Andy Croft & Friends, with dance music from 8pm featuring DJ Desire, Martin 'MJ' Harrison, Mike 'Spike' Harwood, Jonathan Doughty and Little Boy Wonder.

== Riverside Festival 2 - Saturday 6th July 2002 ==
The 2nd Riverside Festival brought in a main festival sponsor, Crestwood, along with Ideal Shopfitters and Newage AVK. The RAMA team consisted of Paula Birbeck, Richard Clark, Darren Cummings, Mike Harwood, Blair Heyden, Sarah Minty, Simon Robinson, Martin Smith and Kev Thurlby. The main development for this year was providing a dedicated dance tent on the north side of the site, towards Bath Row. The festival cost £17,000 to stage. The attendance was estimated at 8,000, with 5,000 on site at any one time. Again a free programme, which can be viewed here:, was produced in return for donations.

The Riverside Stage featured G2, Cutback, Junk Puppets, Plastic Hip, Silverspace, Zilch, One Eyed Cats, The Contrast, Kissmet, Skinny Sumo, Micawba and Celtica. The firework finale was provided by 1605 Fireworks of Kings Cliffe.

The Marquee Stage moved into a wider 100' x 60' marquee and featured Martricyde$, up, Fox Force Five, Qual, Wasted, Amelia, Neo, Atticus Finch, Little Nikita, Janus Stark, March to the Grave and Sckism.

The Acoustic Tent line up was Look My Shop, The Courtney Fish Trio, Carole Palmer, Angry Man, Christian Laverick, Cold Overture, Gemma Lakin, Caravan, Bouveman Brothers, Trenchfoot, Dick Appleton, Paspatou and Blue Room.

The inaugural Riverside Dance had sets from DJ Vapour, Ian Alvey, Mike Harwood, DappaG and Gas Chasney, Red Raw Headstretcher, Martyn Harrison and Nicky P and Stuart Paul Robbins.

Other features included Antwilloart, a giant metal sculpture made from car and motorcycle bits, a free Tai Chi workshop, a funfair from Taylor's Amusements, musical instrument making and the Watermarks art project.

== Riverside Festival 3 - Saturday 5th July 2003 ==
For 2003, Crestwood and Ideal Shopfitters became joint main sponsors and the programme thanked many artists and bands for playing for free, or for costs. Artists this year included Lion Train and Hazel O'Connor. Event costs had risen to £25,000 with an estimated 10,000 people attending and there was a request for generous donations - again donations were asked-for the free programme, which can be viewed here:. Absence of support for the event from South Kesteven District Council and Lincolnshire County Council was referenced with a desire to work with them in future. The RAMA committee consisted of Richard Clark, Darren Cummings, Mike Harwood, Blair Heyden, Sarah Minty, Martin Smith, Ted Taylor, and Kev Thurlby.

The Riverside Stage featured Within, Plastic Hip, Slipstream, Trufflefoot, Moosejaw, Tony Hill's Fiction, Chancer, Liquid Laugh, David Wyatt, Kissmet, Mr Gone, and Lion Train. 1605 Fireworks again provided the finale.

The Marquee Stage line up was Neo, Qual, Millichips Locker, Kingcow, Don't Look Down, Atticus Finch$, up, The More I See, Victims of Noise, Wasted, March to the Grave and Big 10.

The Acoustic Stage hosted The Bouveman Brothers, The Have-Nots, Blue Room, Gina Dootson, Neon Love, Dick Appleton, Bryter Later, Cold Overture, Butterfly Polite, Vikki Clayton, Paspatou Hazel O'Connor and the City University South African Jazz Orchestra.

Riverside Dance was run in partnership with Spanked Events and the running order was DJ String, Red Raw Headstretcher, Ian Alvey, Kid Sample, Stooshka & MC Delight, and G Rolla.

The beer and cider festival was housed in a 60' x 40' marquee and was run by the Green Man pub in Stamford - this also housed a Busker's Stage run by Paul Caffrey. Other attractions included Ted Taylor's funfair, Vander Brothers Big Wheel, Bill Brookman's Circus, Antwilloart and kids activities including Walkabout creating Aboriginal style art.

== Riverside Festival 4 - Saturday 3rd July 2004 ==
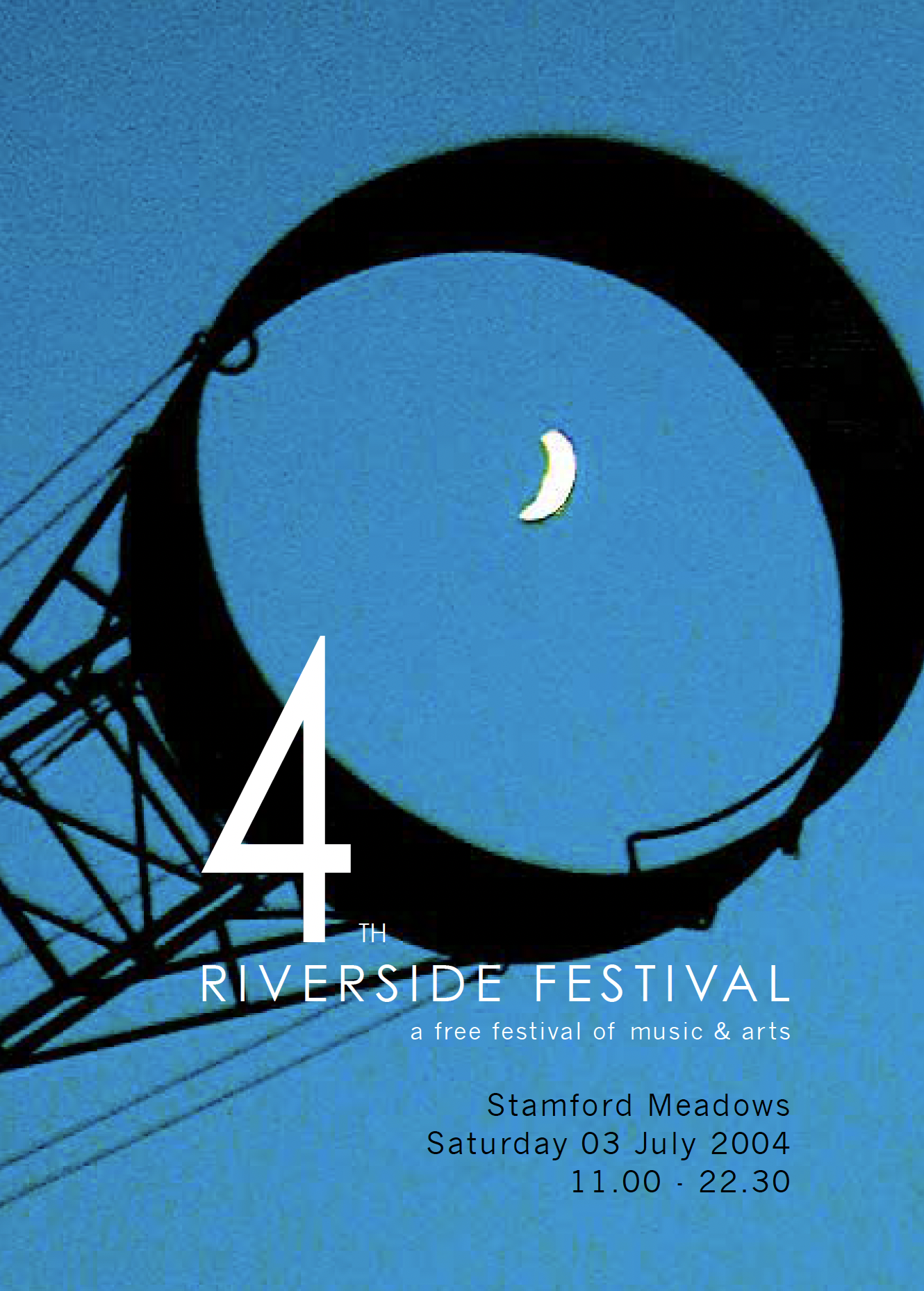
Programme 04 Cover featuring Vander Brothers wheel from 2003

The 2004 festival expanded the status and popularity of the event within the East Midlands, with The Levellers headlining the main stage and The Demon Barbers on the Acoustic Stage. Taylors Amusements were credited as a 3rd main sponsor. New for 2004 was bringing the beer and cider festival under the full control of the festival, working in partnership with Bourne Round Table, who ran the annual Bourne Festival. This was a key move in generating funds for the event. Over 40 real ales were on tap. Concern was expressed that South Kesteven District Council still refused to support the event, while factions in Stamford Town Council, who were opposed to the event, created a scaremonger campaign claiming thousands of new age travellers would descend on the town - the reality was that local hotels and b'n'bs benefited! The RAMA organising committee consisted of Richard Clark, Darren Cummings, Mike Harwood, Blair Heyden, Sarah Minty, Martin Smith, Ted Taylor, and Kev Thurlby. The colour programme featured the big wheel from the previous year's event and can be viewed here. The Riverside Stage running order was Hills of Eyes, Under Age, Delta Red, Z00, The Lightyears, Lenard, Mr Mojo, The Instigators, David Wyatt, El Mahico, The Dead Rabbits, and The Levellers Acoustic. The Marquee Stage line up was Teens of Thailand, Argento, The Brays, Tauracine, Dutch Oven, Kubrick, Matricyde, Djevara, March to the Grave and Big 10, Victims of Noise, Kid Conspiracy and Don't Look Down.

The Acoustic Stage had Bod, Angry Man, Andy Griffiths Take 6, Christian Laverick, Billinomates, Paul McClure, Skatz, Harlem Bogtrotters, Baroque Blues Band, Chris Conway & Dan Britton, Paspatou and The Demon Barbers.

Riverside Dance featured Outer Dark, Red Raw Headstretcher, Ross Johnson, Ian Alvey, Stooshka, Kid Sample and G Rolla.

Other attractions included a Busker's Stage in the beer tent, an Art & Sculpture tent featuring the work of local artists, Bill Brookman's Circus, Antwillowart, kid's activities with wire sculpture and serpent mosaic and a 1,000 balloon launch.

== Riverside Festival 5 - Saturday 2nd July 2005 ==
The programme references the 25th anniversary of the first Music on the Meadows in 1980. Headlining the event were Pink Floyd tribute, Think Floyd, while there were performances from the Band from County Hell, Frank Benbini from the Fun Lovin' Criminals, Blast from Moscow and Sonja Kristina, formerly of Curved Air. The date coincided with the Live 8 concert in London's Hyde Park at which Pink Floyd performed. An estimated 15,000 people attended over the day.

The overall cost for the event had risen to £33,000 and the principal sponsors remained the same, but there was still no support from local authorities. The RAMA organising committee consisted of Richard Clark, Mike Harwood, Blair Heyden, Sarah Minty, Tony Rawlinson, Martin Smith, Ted Taylor, and Kev Thurlby. The 05 Programme can be viewed from this link.

The Riverside Stage featured Soulflower, Thurston Lava Tube, The Lightyears, The Surgens, Chris Watson, JB's Wiretag Band, Expansions, March to the Grave, Uncle Frank & the Ideal Food for Love, Novocain, Lazy Habits, and Think Floyd. The fireworks were again supplied by 1605 and their previous year's display, during the Levellers set, featured on the programme's front cover.

The Marquee Stage running order was The Lounge, Cardboardbox, Radicus, Erika Black, Projekt Mayhem, Matricyde, The Kites, Russian Girlfriend, Blast, $up, 4ft Fingers and Jessie James. The Acoustic Stage ran with Z00, Table Nine, Butterfly Polite, Paspatou, Augustine, Flipron, Semble, Mask with Sonja Kristina, Batchelor Jack, Magic Car and The Band From County Hell.

Riverside Dance included the Glitzzi Girlz, followed by DJs from 5:30pm to 10pm.

Other attractions were the Busker's Stage, the beer and cider festival, again with Bourne Round Table, which featured 75 ales, Bill Brookman's Circus and kids activities run by the MAKE It group.

== Riverside Festival 6 - Saturday 1st July 2006 ==
The event this year featured headliners Enter Shikari Viva Santana. The programme references that the event cost over £41,000 to stage, with the main sponsors being Ideal Shopfitters, Crestwood, Cummins Generator Technologies and Ted Taylor's Amusements - there was still no financial council support. The RAMA committee consisted of Richard Clark, Mike Harwood, Blair Heyden, Sarah Minty, Tony Rawlinson, Martin Smith, Dave Spencer, Ted Taylor, Kev Thurlby and Mark Webber. New for this year was a One Planet environmental exhibition and events space. The programme can be viewed from this link.

The Riverside Stage featured Glass Onion, Ellie Myles, Hadar, Jamson's Nook, Victoria Hume, Blackrose Projects, Relay, Uniting the Elements, Organise Chaos, Coldplace, Jilted Generation, and Viva Santana followed by 1605's firework display.

The Marquee Stage had Wake, Soretooth, Acer, SKisM, Ground Zero, The Ruined, Matricyde, Midget, The More I See, Don't Look Down, Planet of Women and Enter Shikari.

The Acoustic Stage featured Bod, Herbedacious, Hannah Brine Band, Black Carrot, Sean Redmond, Rack and Ruin, Hoax Funeral, James Chadwick, Ghengis Brothers, Zuleika, Firedaze and Mc Dermott's Two Hours.

The Riverside Dance stage hosted Red Raw Headstretcher, Ian Alvey and Nicky P, Stooshka vs MC Delight, Kid Sample and Muller. There was also the regular Busker's Stage, kids activities, Bill Brookman's Circus and beer festival with over 75 real ales.

== To be edited ==
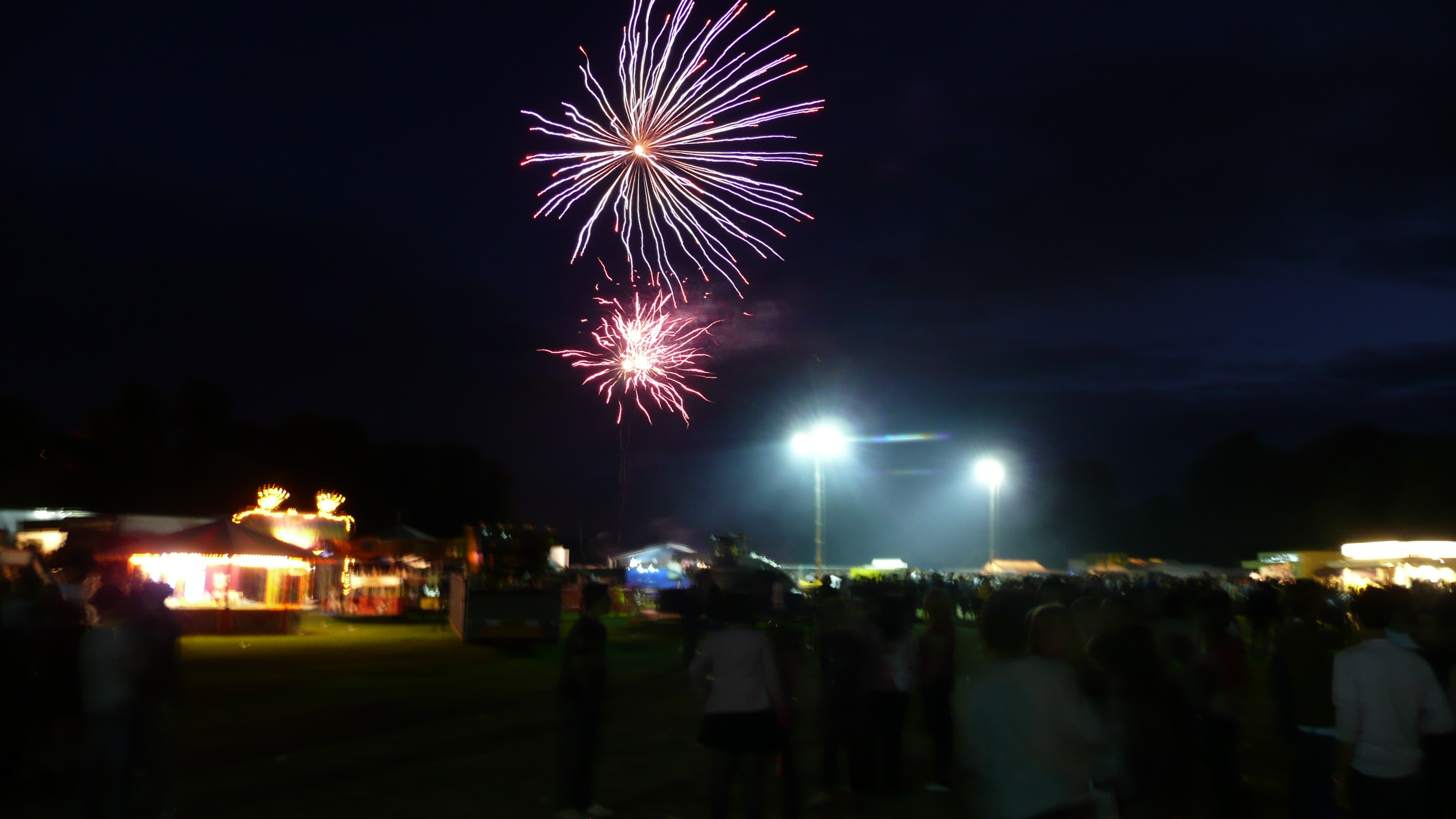

Because of the increasing financial strain of running a free festival, and ever-mounting difficulties in obtaining sponsorship, a request was made for a donation from adults on entry. Other changes included the banning of bringing alcohol to the event, in line with police recommendations.

After 3 successive cancellations the organisation began referring to the festival in the past tense. It may never be held again.

== Festivals ==
=== 2009 ===
The 2009 event took place on 4 July and included sets by Neck and Stornoway.

=== 2010 ===
The 3–4 July 2010 festival utilised four stages, and was held over two days to celebrate the festival's 10th anniversary. A 'Road to Riverside' competition to find a local band to play at the event was arranged by festival organisers and the Rutland and Stamford Mercury, and received 670 entries.

The 2010 event included a set by Los Salvadores.

=== 2011 (cancellation) ===
On 24 December 2010 it was announced that the festival would be cancelled for 2011, through lack of agreement between the organisers and Stamford Town Council over the re-use of the festival site, and the council's concern over previous damage caused, and the organiser's reluctance to provide the council with audited accounts.

A Facebook page was set up in support of the festival. A picnic, promoted by an Internet campaign, was held on the festival date, with a set played by a local band. The picnic was attended by "hundreds of people".

=== 2012 (cancellation) ===
In 2011 it was confirmed that the festival would return for 2012, and would be a ticket only event limited to 15,000 people. The decision to charge entry was to help with rising costs.

This event, too, had to be cancelled. This time the reason was the flooding of the site during a summer of regular heavy rains. Stamford town council intervened when the site was flooded 2 days before the event was due to start.

=== 2013 (cancellation) ===
A plan for a substantial festival in 2013 was cancelled because of difficulties over insurance caused by previous year's flooding. By February the insurers had still not settled for the previous year's cancellation and the committee felt that they could not go ahead for 2013.

== See also ==
- List of music festivals in the United Kingdom
