= Play Fest =

- Dates: Early June
- Locations: Norfolk, England
- Years active: 2011 – 2012
- Website: www.playfest.co.uk

Play Fest was an annual independent music festival that took place at New Eccles Hall, Quidenham, Norfolk, England. It was first held in May 2011.

Play Fest consisted of a comprehensive bill of musicians, bands and artists across various stages. The genres of music on offer were largely rock, indie and dance. It had an annual attendance of around 4,000, which the organisers have expressed an interest in increasing as the festival grows larger with time.

== Play Fest 2011 ==
Play Fest 2011 (the first Play Fest) took place on 27–29 May 2011. Over 2,500 people attended. Tickets cost £70 for the weekend (£60 during the 'early bird' offer). The festival was short-listed for the 'Best New Festival' award at the UK Festival Awards 2011.

Main Stage
Saturday	Sunday
Frank Turner; Darwin Deez; Kill It Kid; Club Smith; The Kabeedies; We Can't Dance; Dumbfoundus	The Futureheads; The King Blues; Get Cape. Wear Cape. Fly. Little Comets; All the Young; Max Raptor; Fever Fever

The Big Top
Saturday	Sunday
The Dirty Tricks The Lost Levels; These Ghosts; The Cads; Slightly Offensive Steve; Solko; Empire; Ideals; Scott Wright	Crumbs for Comfort; The Barlights; Killamonjambo; Hello Bear; The Soviets; Dumbfoundus; Kodeta; Feral Mouth

Dance Arena
Saturday	Sunday
Grooverider; Scotty & Oblivion; Jayda & Mastermind; Perfection & T>I; Blade Runner & Venom; DJ Winner; Pow! Marvel	Ray Keith; Renegade Band; LFM; Luke's Anger; Hedflux; Tom Wilkes; Benji Boko; Get Low Cartel

== Play Fest 2012 ==
Play Fest 2012 took place on 1–3 June 2012. Over 4,000 people attended. Tickets cost £80 for the weekend (£65 during the 'early bird' offer).

Main Stage
Saturday	Sunday
Ash; The Pigeon Detectives; Reverend & the Makers; The Big Pink; Little Comets; Tellison; Tripwires; The Tracks; Solko; Kings & Crows	Feeder; Delilah; Scroobius Pip; Natty; Spector; Lonsdale Boys Club; Ria Ritchie; Dumbfoundus; Lee Vann; Port Isla

The Big Top
Saturday	Sunday
Roots Manuva; Sonic Boom Six; Killamonjambo; Jim Lockey & the Solemn Sun; Alloy Ark; Kamilla Lovett; The B.Goodes; Eyes; Under the Influence; Dingus Khan	The Correspondents; Federation of the Disco Pimp; Juan Zelada; Boat to Row; Deers; Rory McVicar; Model Staggs; The Soft; Underline the Sky; Ill Murray

Dance Arena
Saturday	Sunday
Shy FX; DJ Zinc; Mele; DJ EZ; B.Traits; Urban Nerds; DJ Cable; Get Low Cartel	Sub Focus; Toddla T Jaymo & Andy George; Foamo; Spencer (NMBRS); Bondax; Joshua Roberts; Oli Dab & Robin

Artists who performed on the Friday of the festival included The Kabeedies, Crumbs for Comfort, Hemingway, Empire, DJ@WAR and DJ Andy H.

== See also ==
- List of music festivals in the United Kingdom
