= Dirty Tricks =

Dirty Tricks may refer to:

- Dirty Tricks (scandal) (British Airways scandal)
- Dirty Tricks (film), a 1981 American comedy film
- Political sabotage, also known as ratfucking in the United States
  - The chicanery involved in the Watergate scandal (early 1970s, United States)
    - John N. Mitchell § Dirty tricks
- The dirty trick, a political scandal in Israel in 1990
- The Dirty Tricks, a Canadian rock band
