= The Kabeedies discography =

The complete discography of The Kabeedies.

== Releases ==
=== The Radical Tearoom ===
Album (3 September 2008)

1. Petits Filous
2. Lovers Ought To
3. Mythical Beasts
4. Coaster Games
5. Paddling
6. Adhesive Stick
7. Sideburns
8. Come On
9. Coaster Game (Halfby and Walkman – Hotel Baltimore Remix)

=== Ten Animals I Slam in a Net ===
7-inch EP (1 September 2008)

1. Palindromes
2. King Canute
3. Coaster Game (Acoustic)

=== Lovers Ought To ===
7-inch single (20 May 2008)

1. Lovers Ought To
2. Mythical Beasts
3. Come On

=== Treasure Hunting ===
7-inch single (20 October 2008)

1. Treasure Hunting
2. Treasure Hunting (Bobby McGees Cover)
3. Treasure Hunting (Francis & Louis Cover)

=== Little Brains ===
7-inch + CD single (13 April 2009)

1. Little Brains
2. Fuzzy Felt
3. Duck Egg Blue

=== Petits Filous ===
single (5 October 2009)

1. Petits Filous
2. Cut The Cord
3. Surfin Kraken

=== Rumpus ===
Album (9 November 2009)

1. Fuzzy Felt
2. Lovers Ought To
3. Comic Splender
4. Petits Filous
5. We Make Our Own Adventures
6. Duck Egg Blue
7. Apple
8. Little Brains
9. Sideburns
10. Petroleum Jelly
11. Palindromes
12. King Canute
13. Treasure Hunting
14. Jitterbug

=== Jitterbug Re-Edit ===
Digital single (15 March 2010)

1. Jitterbug Re-Edit

=== Rumpus (export edition) ===
CD album (1 September 2010)

1. Fuzzy Felt
2. Lovers Ought To
3. Comic Splendor
4. Petits Filous
5. We Make Our Own Adventures
6. Duck Egg Blue
7. Apple
8. Little Brains
9. Sideburns
10. Petroleum Jelly
11. Palindromes
12. King Canute
13. Treasure Hunting
14. Jitterbug
15. Cut the Cord
16. Surfin Kraken
17. Jitterbug Re-Edit
18. Coaster Game (Acoustic)
19. Lovers Ought To (Acoustic)
20. We Make Our Own Adventures (Acoustic)
21. King Canute (Acoustic)

=== Come Out of the Blue ===
7-inch vinyl and digital single (4 October 2010)

1. Come Out of the Blue
2. Milk

=== Santiago ===
Digital single (4 April 2011)

1. Santiago
