= T in the Park 2000 =

Music festival in Scotland

T in the Park
- Dates: 8–9 July 2000
- Locations: Balado, Scotland, UK
- Years active: 1994–present
- Website: http://tinthepark.com/

This was held on Saturday 8 and Sunday 9 July 2000, with 50,000 people attending. It was Travis' first appearance, as an unsigned band closed the Main Stage. It was All Saints' last Scottish appearance.

A week prior to the event an accident happened at Roskilde Festival where nine people died. Following the incident security arrangements were reviewed while making sure the relevant safety procedures were in place to ensure a failsafe.

== Line-up ==
The line up included:

=== Main stage ===
Saturday 8 July	Sunday 9 July
Moby; Ocean Colour Scene; Fun Lovin' Criminals; Gomez; The Blue Tones; All Saints; Feeder; Lynden David Hall; David Gray	Travis; Macy Gray; Supergrass; Iggy Pop; Idlewild; Lulu; Bootleg Beatles; The Clint Boon Experience

=== Stage 2 ===
Saturday 8 July	Sunday 9 July
Beth Orton; Morcheeba; The Wannadies; Doves; My Vitriol; At the Drive In; Aereogramme; LSK	David Holmes (DJ); Embrace; Muse; Groove Armada; Dark Star; JJ72; Day One; Manchild; Dara

=== Slam Tent ===
Saturday 8 July	Sunday 9 July
DJ Sneak & Gene Farris Vs Roger Sanchez & Junior Sanchez; Derrick May; Tom Middleton; Funk D'Void; Rolando (UR)	Carl Cox & Jim Masters vs Slam (Stuart McMillan & Orde Meikle); Leftfield; Darren Emerson; Andrew Weatherall; Death In Vegas; James Lavelle; Universal Principles (feat. Stuart McMillan / Nick Peacock / Glen Gibbons)

=== King Tut's Tent ===
Saturday 8 July	Sunday 9 July
Moloko; Badly Drawn Boy; Toploader; Dum Dums; Looper; Crashland; Hobotalk; King Adora; It's Jo and Danny; Kevin Saunderson	Flaming Lips; Les Rythmes Digitales; Blackalicious; A; Coldplay; Urusei Yatsura; Soulwax; Justin Lewis; Kevin McDermott Orchestra; The Boho Sub Band

== See also ==
- List of music festivals in the United Kingdom
