= Jack Up The Summer Festival =

British music festival

Jack Up The Summer
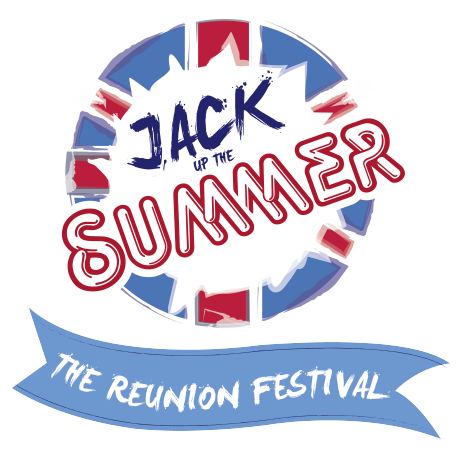
- Genre: Pop; new wave; synthpop; rock
- Dates: 6–8 August 2021
- Locations: North Fairlee Farm, Newport, Isle of Wight, England
- Years active: 2013–present
- Website: https://jackupthesummer.co.uk

Jack Up The Summer is a music festival that takes place annually in Newport on the Isle of Wight, England. The festival was first held in August 2013 and helps fundraise for a range of local charities and good causes. Originally called "Jack Up The 80s", the festival showcases bands and solo artists that had success in the 1980s. In 2019 the name was changed to allow for a greater variety of acts, with household name artists from the 1990s and occasionally 2000s added to the expanded line-up.

As well as music, the site features a vintage funfair, kids workshops and attractions, local caterers and trade stalls. In keeping with Now That's What I Call Music!, a series of compilation albums launched in the 1980s featuring a range of popular recording artists, each festival year is awarded a consecutive volume number.

== Jack Up The 80s vol 1 2013 ==
The first Jack Up festival was held on 10 and 11 August 2013 on the same site as the Isle of Wight Garlic Festival in Newchurch. The event was held to celebrate 25 years of Wight Crystal water, an Isle of Wight charity selling spring water products, flavours and water coolers, to raise money to fund care services, employment and life-enhancing opportunities for people with a range of disabilities.

The festival featured 12 acts, with Bad Manners and Heaven 17 headlining Saturday and Sunday evening respectively. Other acts on the bill were Toyah, Katrina & The Waves, Junior Giscombe, Eddie & The Hot Rods, Doctor and The Medics, Matchbox, The Lambrettas, Bootleg Blondie (a tribute to the American rock band Blondie), ska band Orange Street, and The Hoosiers. Although the latter are not synonymous with the music of the 80s, they were said to help widen the appeal of the festival for younger attendees.

== Jack Up The 80s vol 2 2014 ==
The second Jack Up festival was held on 9 and 10 August 2014. The headline acts were Imagination (feat. Leee John) and Bad Manners. Other acts on the bill were The Blow Monkeys, former Kajagoogoo lead singer Limahl, Hazel O’Connor, Hazell Dean, Tight Fit, Jona Lewie, Janet Kay, Tenpole Tudor, Doctor and The Medics, Jive Bunny and the Mastermixers and Bucks Fizz (The Fizz). DJ, radio and television presenter Pat Sharp hosted the main stage.

Actor John Altman, best known for playing Nick Cotton in the BBC soap opera Eastenders, made a guest appearance on the Sunday and sang the 1985 hit “Summer of '69”, made famous by Bryan Adams.

== Jack Up The 80s vol 3 2015 ==
The third Jack Up festival was held on 8 and 9 August 2015. The headline acts were ABC and Go West. Other acts on the bill were The Christians, From The Jam, Jaki Graham, Sonia, Nathan Moore of Brother Beyond, Phil Fearon, Bucks Fizz (The Fizz), Complete Madness a tribute to ska/pop group Madness and Abba Chique (a tribute to Swedish pop group ABBA). TV presenter Timmy Mallett carried out a live rendition of the word-association game Mallett's Mallet made famous in the 1980s and early 90s by the children's television series Wacaday. Pat Sharp played a DJ set on the Sunday. David Van Day formally of 1980s pop vocal duo Dollar, made a guest appearance on the Saturday.

The event was sponsored by Barratt Homes and continued to support Island charity Wight Crystal.

== Jack Up The 80s vol 4 2016 ==
The fourth Jack Up festival was held on 13 and 14 August 2016. The headline acts were Five Star and Leo Sayer. Other acts on the bill were Paul Young, Johnny Hates Jazz, London Beat, Bad Manners, Owen Paul, Angie Brown, Phil Fearon, Nathan Moore of Brother Beyond and Abba Chique (a tribute to Swedish pop group ABBA). Isle of Wight bands Ska’d For Life and High School Never Ends opened the show on both days.

Funk jazz outfit Light Of The World provided a previously un-billed bonus set on the Saturday.

== Jack Up The 80s vol 5 2017 ==
The fifth Jack Up festival was held on 11, 12 and 13 August 2017. The event moved site 5 miles down the road from Newchurch, to Smallbrook Stadium in Ryde. In doing so it provided sponsorship to the Wightlink Warriors speedway team and was located in closer proximity to cross Solent ferry services which bought benefits to mainland visitors.

The move allowed for the edition of a third night and a later licence as well as enabling provision for a second stage for young Island talent. Programmed by students from Platform One College of Music, the stage featured a range of music from acoustic acts, tribute acts and original bands.

The headline acts were Jason Donovan and Alexander O’Neal. Other acts on the bill were Nik Kershaw, The Real Thing, Bucks Fizz (The Fizz), From The Jam and Bootleg Blondie. Paving the way for a gradual move into the 1990s, S Club and Right Said Fred also appeared as part of the line-up. Pat Sharp played a DJ set on the Sunday. Island bands Ska’d For Life and Derek Sandy were first to perform.

The Friday night offered an optional “Opening Party” featuring Romanian singing duo The Cheeky Girls and Abba Chique.

== Jack Up The 80s vol 6 2018 ==
The sixth Jack Up festival was held on 10, 11 and 12 August 2018. The Friday night Opening Party featured The Magic of Motown stage show, a theatre production which paid tribute to the back catalogue of hits launched on Motown Records throughout the 1960s, 70s and 80s.

The headline acts for the main weekend were Leo Sayer and Shalamar. Other acts on the bill were T’Pau, Chesney Hawkes, Martin Kemp (DJ set), Shakatak, Jaki Graham, Nathan Moore of Brother Beyond and Toyah.

Boy band Five and electronic dance music duo Phats & Small continued the festival's moderate progression into the 1990s and 2000s. Pat Sharp and Wave 105’s Steve Power both played DJ sets. Ska band Orange Street kicked off proceedings on the Saturday with T.Rextasy a tribute to English rock band T.Rex opening the show by paying homage to the Glam Rock era on the Sunday.

BBC Radio 1 DJ and Top of the Pops presenter Mike Read introduced a number of the acts.

The festival supported Prostate Cancer UK as its nominated Charity of the Year to raise awareness about the disease. Local man Ian Gregory pledged to pedal 731 miles over the weekend in an attempt to travel the equivalent length of the country from the Jack Up site in Ryde to John O'Groats in Scotland.

== Jack Up The Summer vol 7 2019 ==
The seventh Jack Up festival was held on 9, 10 and 11 August 2019. The event moved site from Ryde, to the Island’s capital town and central location of Newport. It was at this point the name evolved from “Jack Up The 80s” to “Jack Up The Summer” with organisers confirming the 80s spirit would always remain at the heart of the event. The festival now takes place in the same location the campsite for the Isle of Wight Festival which is staged two months prior.

The Friday night Opening Party featured Bad Manners and Island band Ska’d For Life performing as part of “Ultimate Ska Wars.”

The Saturday and Sunday were billed as being “80’s Day” and “90’s Day” respectively. Unseasonable gale-force winds effecting events across the whole of the UK, meant that officials deemed the site unsafe to open on the Saturday, however despite damage caused by the shift in wind direction, the stage was successfully rebuilt overnight to allow the show to continue as planned once the adverse weather conditions had subsided on the Sunday.

Appearing acts included East 17, 911, Republica, Space, Phats & Small, Livin’ Joy and Noasis (a tribute to English Rock band Oasis). Local band Vote Pedro opened the days live music proceedings. Those artists unable to perform on the Saturday were subsequently rebooked and announced for the following year.

For the first time the festival introduced a fancy dress theme and played host to the Island's biggest ever unicorn party. The event supported various Woman's Institute's from across the Isle of Wight via the provision of a tea tent enabling them to raise valuable funds for their charity, whilst giving something back to the local community.

== Jack Up The Summer vol 8 2020 ==
The eighth Jack Up festival was due to be held on 7, 8 and 9 August 2020. It's nominated Charity of the Year was announced as being Beaulieu Respite and Children's Home, to which lead singer and bassist of the Isle of Wight band Level 42 Mark King is patron.

With headline act Heather Small and a variety of dance and tribute acts plus Club Tropicana fancy dress theme having already been confirmed the festival subsequently had to be postponed in May 2020 on account of the Coronavirus pandemic.

Both Heather Small and Heaven 17 have been confirmed to headline the event, which is rescheduled to take place on 6, 7 and 8 August 2021. A range of additional acts have also been revealed, with the vast majority of the original 2020 line-up having been rolled over to the following year.

In November 2020 Event Organiser Sarah Moss was quoted in an article alongside the Isle of Wight MP Bob Seely highlighting the importance of festivals and events to the Island's tourism economy and the devastating impact of COVID-19 on this socially and economically significant sector. On 9 December 2020 organisers were reported as having met with the Minister of State for Culture to outline the required measures to enable small-medium-sized independent festivals like Jack Up The Summer to return safely in 2021.

== Spin-off events ==
A series of retro spin-off events from the festival are staged throughout the course of the year to celebrate the music of alternative decades:

Event name	Featuring	Dates	Location
Ticket to Ryde (60s themed community event)	Orange Street The Jammers Various local MOD, SKA, Two-Tone, Trojan, Northern Soul bands	22–24 Aug 2014 28–30 Aug 2015 26–28 Aug 2016 25–27 Aug 2017 24–26 Aug 2018 23–25 Aug 2019	Eastern Gardens, Ryde Isle of Wight
Jack Up Christmas (80s and 90s themed party nights)	Urban Cookie Collective Dario G Bucks Fizz (The Fizz)	22–23 Nov 2019	Lower Hyde Holiday Park, Shanklin Isle of Wight
Jack Up The 70s (70s themed party night)	The Zoots	22 Feb 2020	Lower Hyde Holiday Park, Shanklin Isle of Wight

== See also ==
- List of music festivals in the United Kingdom
- List of festivals in the United Kingdom
