= Cambridge Radio =

Coordinates: 52.20382°N 0.13857°E

Cambridge 105 Radio
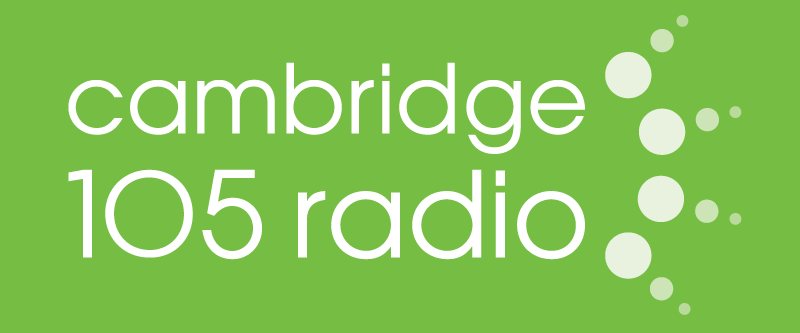
- Cambridge; England
- Broadcast area: Cambridgeshire
- Frequencies: FM: 105.0 MHz; DAB: 9C (Cambridge); DAB: 9C (Norwich); DAB: 9C (King's Lynn)
- RDS: Camb 105

Programming
- Language: English

History
- First air date: 19 July 2010

Links
- Webcast: Web Player; Stream URL (MP3 128k)
- Website: cambridge105.co.uk

Cambridge Radio (formerly Cambridge 105 Radio) is the Ofcom regulated community radio station for the city of Cambridge based on Gwydir Street Enterprise Centre. The station broadcasts across the City and South Cambridgeshire on 105 FM, on its website https://cambridge.radio and on DAB Digital Radio seven days a week.

On 7 December 2024, the station rebranded as Cambridge Radio.

== History ==
=== 209radio ===
In 1998, a group of volunteers began Cambridge Café Radio as a community radio station. The licence was then purchased by media entrepreneur Peter Dawe and rebranded as Cambridge Red 107.9. In 2001 it was sold again, this time to the UKRD Group to become 107.9 The Eagle and then Star Radio.

In March 2004, Karl Hartland and Lucy Clifton began an internet radio station that they called 209radio, named after their address 209 Campkin Road in Cambridge. Karl presented a regular music show called Irreducible Representation whose reputation grew until others offered to contribute or present similar shows. Within a few months there were 20 such shows each week with the station on air during weeknights and weekends, with contributors eventually ranging from members of the homeless community to the elderly and a group of 14-year-old girls.

Realising the continuing potential of a community radio station to the city of Cambridge, they applied for an Ofcom licence, and in 2007 were granted an FM broadcast licence. The studio was moved from Karl and Lucy's living room to the Citylife offices (vacated Star Radio and Red TV studios) in Sturton Street and the station went live on 105.0 MHz in October 2007.

Although run almost entirely by volunteers (with three paid staff members), over the next two years, the station struggled to raise the £60,000 required to stay on air and eventually in February 2010, despite a strong following around the city, 209radio ceased broadcasting. Rather than return the licence to Ofcom, the team voted to transfer the licence to a new team keen to continue a community radio station in Cambridge.

=== First broadcast ===
Cambridge 105 Radio made its first broadcast on 19 July 2010. This followed several months of 'birdsong' broadcast from the 105 MHz transmitter, following the closure of the previous community station 209radio. Ofcom required Cambridge 105 Radio to start broadcasting immediately upon receipt of the licence. Notification was received on the afternoon of Monday 18 July that the transfer would occur the following day. Equipment was set up in the house of then station director Axel Minet, and on the evening of 19 July, the station debuted with The Urban Bassline Show from 19:00 to 21:00, hosted by Johnny 5, followed by Sammy B-Side spinning some late night hip-hop.

=== New Studios ===
In October 2010, Cambridge 105 Radio secured new premises at the Gwydir Street Enterprise Centre, Cambridge. The property was an old industrial unit that used to be home to a paper binders.

Cambridge 105 Radio sought out volunteers and donations to secure the manpower and resources to start construction of studios. Due to the low budget and limited time allowed alongside volunteers' day jobs, progress with construction was slow. However, by December 2010 the station was broadcasting from the new premises.

In early 2013, the second studio of Cambridge 105 Radio became operational. This new professional studio, dubbed 'Studio B', worked in conjunction with 'Studio A' to provide volunteers with a space to pre-record programmes and bring in guests for pre-recorded interviews.

=== Broadcasting online ===
Cambridge 105 Radio began broadcasting online via their web stream in May 2011. Online streaming is now via the RadioPlayer system on their Homepage with TuneIn Radio and RadioPlayer apps also available for all major mobile operating systems (Android, iOS), so that people can also listen from their mobile phones and tablet computers. TuneIn support allows listening via smart devices, such as Amazon's Alexa, Google's Home, and internet connected speaker systems such as SONOS. Cambridge 105 Radio is consistently listed in the Daily Telegraph list of best internet stations.

=== DAB Digital Radio ===
Cambridge 105 Radio began broadcasting on DAB Digital Radio as part of the Ofcom split-site small scale DAB trials in Cambridge & Norwich during September 2015.

Cambridge 105 Radio is also available on DAB Digital Radio in Norwich and West Norfolk on their respective small-scale mini-muxes.

=== Today ===
Cambridge Radio operates a system that separates all of its programming between 'Daytime' and 'Specialist' from Monday to Friday with some exceptions.

- 'Daytime' programming plays a mixture of music from the 1960s to the present day. It also includes selections from the Cambridge Radio playlist and 'Unsigned Chart' which features local artists and bands generally not aligned with major record companies.
- 'Specialist' programmes (typically in the evenings/weekends) play more eclectic and specialised content.

== Broadcasting ==
=== Studios ===
Cambridge Radio broadcasts from its studios on the Gwydir Street Enterprise Centre in the city centre of Cambridge.

Construction of the studios began shortly after the premises were acquired in October 2010. The first broadcasts from the site began as early as December whilst building work continued around both live and pre-recorded programming.

The studios were constructed with help from volunteers such as carpentry and joinery students from Cambridge Regional College, who volunteered their time. In return, they got some experience and references that could help find them their first jobs after finishing their courses.

Other volunteers came from both within the station and the local community to help with supplying materials and labour, many of whom also helped the station decorate the office area.

=== Outside broadcasts ===
Cambridge 105 Radio broadcasts from various outside events across the year, some of the most notable include:

- Red Nose Day - The station completed its first outside broadcast with the help of Cambridge Repeater Group on 18 March 2011. Cambridge 105 broadcast live from three separate locations in the centre of the city. The broadcast featured reports on fundraising activities around the city as well as a number of live sets by local bands. A total of £321.03 was raised in aid of Comic Relief.
- Strawberry Fair - Annually from 2011 to 2018 - Cambridge 105 broadcast live from Midsummer Common for the annual Strawberry Fair. The broadcasts featured interviews with stall owners, fair goers and live music from local artists and musicians across the day.
- Cambridge Rock Festivals in 2011, 2012, 2013 & 2014 - A four-day broadcast from the Rock Festival site, featuring live performances and interviews from acts taking part.
- Cherry Hinton Festival 2011 - Interviews from the event and local bands performing live.
- Wish You Were Here Festival 2011 - Live studio performances and interviews from the featured bands plus a four-hour broadcast from the stage at the Portland Arms.
- Children In Need - 2012, 2013 & 2014 Cambridge 105 Radio took to the streets to raise money for Children In Need. With the help of local musicians the station raised just over £1,700 (2012), just over £2,000 (2013) and just over £2100 (2014).
- Tour De France 2014 - 7 July 2014. The race started the third stage from Cambridge to London on Parker's Piece, by Gonville Place, from where the Peloton rode through the historic city centre and on into Cambridgeshire and then Essex. Cambridge 105 broadcast live from 5am from the start line continuously throughout the whole of the day with live reports from several reporters throughout the city and further along the route as far as Saffron Walden. Cambridge 105 Radio provided greater coverage than any other broadcaster serving the Cambridge area and was one of the biggest outside broadcasts the station has carried out.
- NMG Sessions - Since 2011, Cambridge has been promoting and supporting local unsigned bands and artists in the Cambridge area through the New Music Generator. NMG sessions are held at the Portland Arms in Cambridge and are either broadcast live or recorded for later broadcast.
- Children in Need at Waitrose Trumpington.
- Mill Road Winter Fair at Donkey Common near Parker's Piece.
- Cambridge Band Competition from The Junction / Portland Arms

== Programming ==
The Cambridge Radio schedule is split into daytime output & specialist programming. Daytime programming covers a popular mix of music from the 1960s all the way through to the present day, whilst specialist picks up on a diverse range of genres.

=== Notable programming ===
==== Breakfast ====
Julian Clover presents Cambridge Breakfast live Monday to Thursday from 7 – 9.30am from Gwydir Street. The show features a mix of news, music and information relevant for those living and working in the city and south Cambridgeshire. Friday Breakfast is presented by Linda Ness.

==== Saturday Breakfast/Morning ====
The weekly Saturday Breakfast show is presented by Daniel Baker from 8 - 10am. The programme features guests, music, local news and information for the city and South Cambridgeshire.

Saturday mornings are presented by Gavin Richards with a range of local community guests.

==== Daytimes ====
The station's weekday daytime output consists of music from the 1960s to the present day with a greater emphasis from the 80s onward and a mix of local topical debate and discussion. Key presenters across the daytime include – Early Breakfast from 6 – 7am (Brian O'Reilly), Mid-Mornings from 9.30am – 12pm (Alex Elbro, Chris Brown, Matthew Parrott and Christine Schneider) and Lunchtimes from 12 – 2pm (Stu Wren, Frazer Mott, Scott King).

==== Drive/Home ====
The current weekday Drive show (known as 'Home') is presented by former Sky News presenter Steffi Callister from Tuesday-Thursday. Mondays and Fridays are presented by Lucy Milazzo and Matthew Parrott. The show broadcasts from 4 – 6pm every weekday with local and national news at the top of every hour, travel updates, local sport and guests from around the city at 5:30pm.

=== Specialist programming ===
Specialist programming covers a diverse range of music genres, including, classical, soul, rock and roll, indie, house, rock, hip hop, dubstep, rhythm and blues, ska and reggae.

== Awards ==
The station won Bronze for 'Station Sound of the Year' in the first Community Radio Awards to take place in 2016. The award recognised how the station's imaging effectively branded the station.

Cambridge Radio's men's interests and issues on air and podcast series 'Talking Men' took bronze for Podcast of the Year at the 2017 and a Silver for Speech and Journalism of the Year in the 2019 Community Radio Awards.

In 2021 the station won the gold Community Award at the SME Cambridgeshire Business Awards.

In 2024, the station again won a number of awards including presenters Steffi Callister, Amy Gray and Sean Lang for his adaption of "A Christmas Carol".

== Fundraising and the community ==
Cambridge Radio raises money in the community through outside broadcasts and broadcast marathons. These have included Cambridge Radio's annual Macmillan World's Biggest Coffee Morning held at its city centre studios and also broadcast live on the air, raising over £1,500 in total for the cancer charity from 2013 to 2017.
