= Clapham, Bedfordshire =

Village and parish in England

Coordinates: 52.164892°N 0.501964°W

Clapham
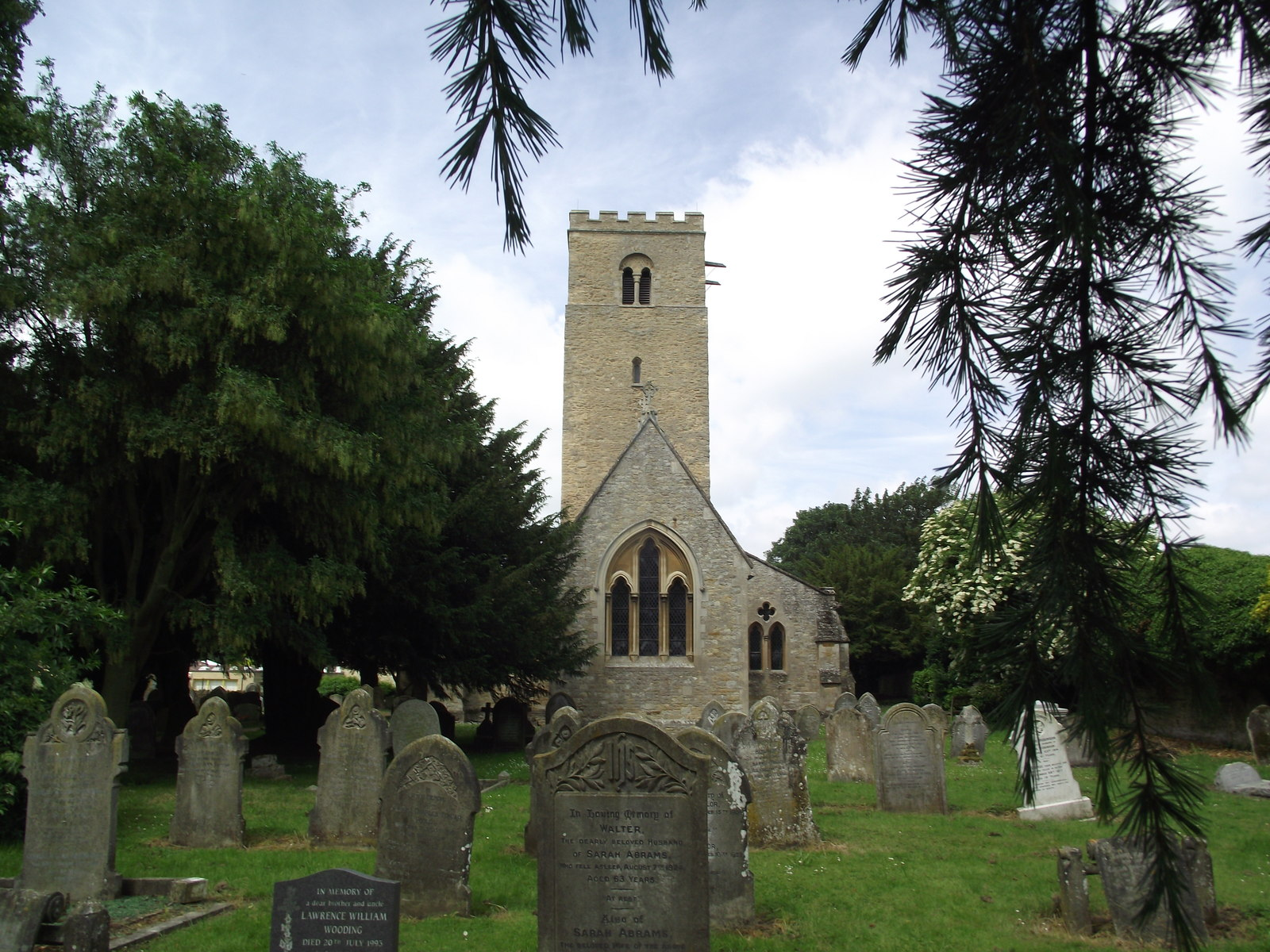
- Clapham St Thomas parish church

- Location within Bedfordshire
- Population: 3,643 (2001); 4,560 (2011 census)
- OS grid reference: TL024529
- Unitary authority: Bedford
- Ceremonial county: Bedfordshire
- Region: East
- Country: England
- Sovereign state: United Kingdom
- Post town: BEDFORD
- Postcode district: MK41
- Dialling code: 01234
- Police: Bedfordshire
- Fire: Bedfordshire
- Ambulance: East of England
- UK Parliament: North Bedfordshire

Clapham is a village and civil parish in the Borough of Bedford in Bedfordshire, England. It had a population of 3,643 as at the 2001 census, increasing to 4,560 at the 2011 Census.

Originally the A6 road passed through the village, but a bypass was built in 2002.

== Points of interest ==
Clapham Park, a large new country house, was built by James Howard, member of parliament for Bedford, in 1872.

RAF Twinwood Farm, a disused airfield on the western outskirts of the village, is where the famous bandleader Glenn Miller took off on his last fateful flight, having performed for the American soldiers based at the airfield and at Bedford Corn Exchange. The site now hosts the Glenn Miller/Twinwood museum, with an annual Twinwood Festival.

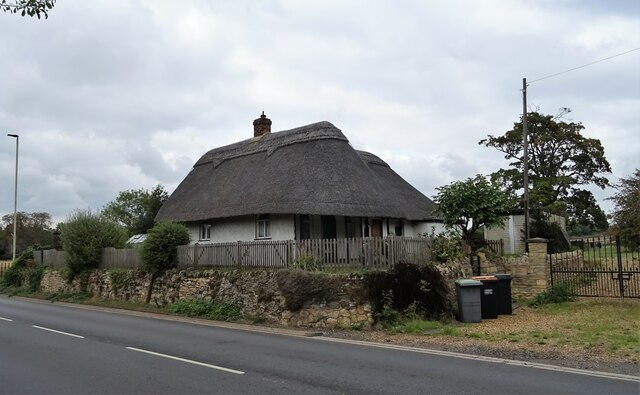
Thatched cottage

Woodlands Manor was built in 1812 by Thomas Dawson, and has been in use as a hotel since 1973.

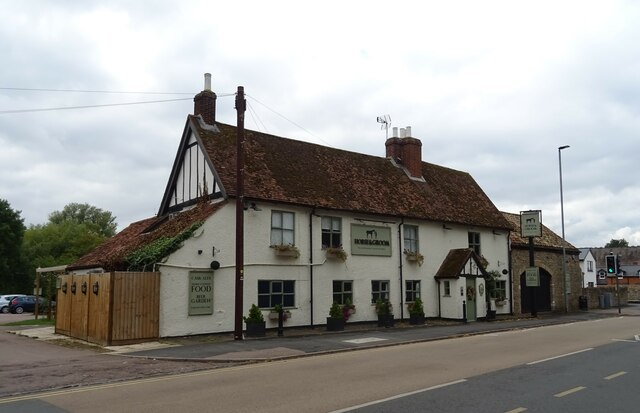
The Horse & Groom pub in 2022

The high street has a number of local shops, takeaways, and two remaining public houses - The Horse & Groom and Fox & Hounds (the village had as many as four pubs and two social clubs in the 1990s).

It has a parish church, St Thomas of Canterbury, and a primary school, Ursula Taylor.

== Sport and recreation ==
Clapham has a King George V Field in memorial to King George V.

Bedford and County golf club is situated on Green Lane in the village.

The village hall hosts many community activities including the annual village show.

On the edge of the village entering Bedford, there is a sports and health club and gym.

The Twinwood Arena hosted the Rhythm Festival in the early 00s.
