= Twinwood Festival =

English annual vintage music and dance festival in Clapham, Bedfordshire

- Genre: Vintage music including swing, jazz and jive
- Locations: The former RAF Twinwood Farm Airfield in Clapham, Bedfordshire, England, UK
- Years active: 2002-present
- Website: www.twinwoodevents.com

Twinwood Festival is an annual vintage music and dance festival, held every August bank holiday weekend at Twinwood Arena in Clapham, Bedfordshire.

== History ==
Twinwood Festival is held at the former RAF Twinwood Farm Airfield in Clapham, Bedfordshire, England. On 27 August 1944, Glenn Miller & his AAF band performed an outdoor concert at RAF Twinwood. The stage was a flatbed trailer, and the audience, which consisted of the RAF personnel who worked at RAF Twinwood, sat on the grass not far from the Twinwood Control Tower. Later on that year, on 15 December 1944, Glenn Miller boarded a Norseman aircraft from RAF Twinwood and he was never seen or heard of again.

After World War II, R.A.F. Twinwood was decommissioned and the site lay almost untouched. In 1989 the company Twinwood Events was formed and work started on the restoration of the Twinwood Control Tower to convert it into the Glenn Miller Museum. In 2002 a celebration Glenn Miller concert was held to mark the completion of the restoration. The success of the Glenn Miller concert led to the birth of the annual Glenn Miller Festival, which was held over the August bank-holiday weekend, as the weekend often falls on or near 27 August.

== Current festival ==
Since 2002 the Glenn Miller Festival had grown, and in 2007 the name was changed to "Twinwood Festival" in order that a slightly wider genre of music could be performed at the festival, and it is now one of the largest vintage music festivals in Europe. Many well known swing, jazz, and jive bands and orchestras from the UK and Europe have performed at the festival, including The John Miller Orchestra, The Glenn Miller Orchestra, The Syd Lawrence Orchestra, Chris Smith and his String of Pearls Orchestra, King Pleasure and the Biscuit Boys, The Jive Aces, Blue Harlem, Bill Baker's Big Band Sticky Wicket and His Swing Band, The Kings Cross Hot Club, The RCA band, the Mike Sanchez band, and Max Raabe with the Palast Orchester.

In 2008 Twinwood Festival had four stages, each with a large sprung wooden dance floor in front and a host of live bands that performed continuously throughout the three-day festival amongst numerous other attractions.

In 2010, a further dance floor was added.

In 2011 Twinwood Festival held its tenth anniversary event and has continued to grow year on year with a bigger line up of artists, more venues, larger dance floors and many other events and attractions across the whole site.
