= Blue Rocks =

Blue Rocks may refer to:

- Blue Rocks, Tasmania, Australia
- Blue Rocks, Nova Scotia, Canada
- Wilmington Blue Rocks, a Minor League Baseball team
- The Symplegades or Cyanean Rocks, at the Black Sea outlet of the Bosphorus

== See also ==
- Blue Rock (disambiguation)
