= Midlands Music Festival =

Music festival in Tamworth, England

The Midlands Music Festival
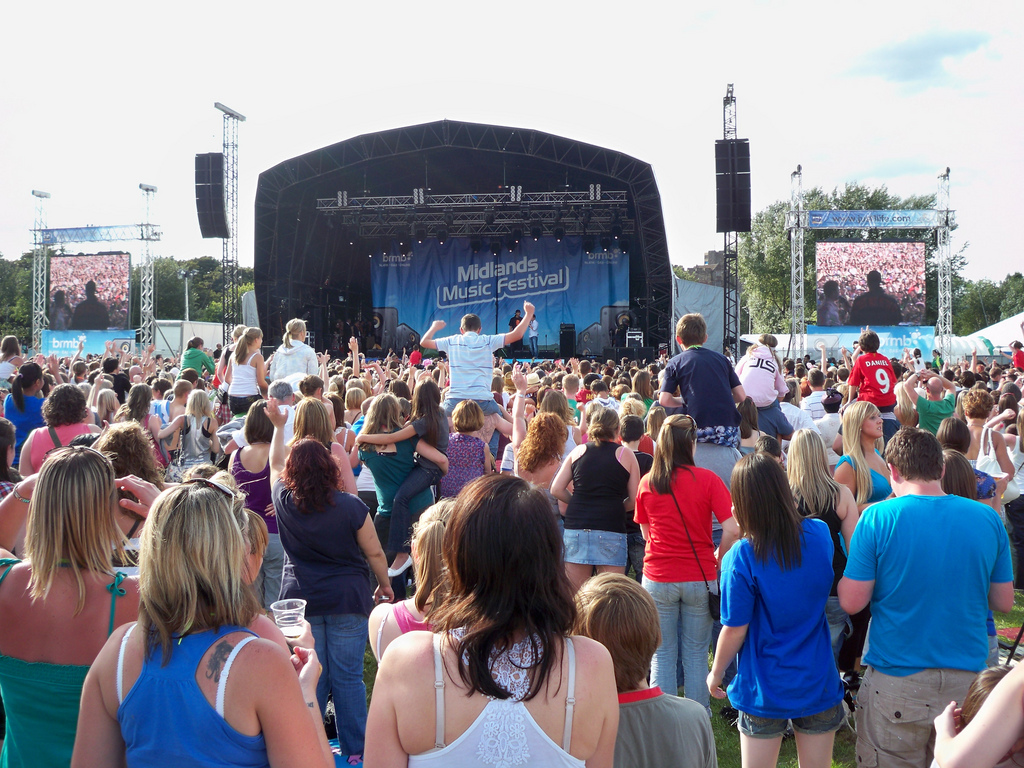
- Genre: Pop
- Dates: 2009 – 8 August 2010 – 17–18 July
- Locations: Tamworth Castle, Tamworth, England, United Kingdom
- Years active: 2009–10
- Capacity: 25,000
- Website: http://themidlandsmusicfestival.co.uk

The Midlands Music Festival was an annual festival held in the Castle Grounds, in Tamworth organised by the charity Just1Life. The first show took place on 8 August 2009 and featured top acts including Lemar, Sugababes, Blue and JLS. In 2010 the daily capacity was 25,000.

== Yearly line-ups ==
=== 2009 ===
Main Stage: Blue, Sugababes, Lemar, JLS, Eoghan Quigg, The Automatic, Liz McClarnon, Austin Drage, Rachel Hylton, Chico, Andy Abraham, Laura White, Diversity (dance troupe), Twenty Twenty, Everybody Looks Famous, Double Time Heroes

=== 2010 ===
The 2010 Midlands Music Festival was a 2 day event, staged on 17 and 18 July 2010. On Saturday 17 July the line up was a "Back to the ’80s" day, followed by "The Biggest Chart Acts" on Sunday 18 July. Attendance levels reached 25,000.

The festival however, was not without controversy. Hosted in the grounds of Tamworth Castle, which is held in covenant for the people of Tamworth by the local Borough Council, some residents of Tamworth were aggrieved at the lack of accessibility to the grounds during the festival, with some residents claiming the festival effectively banned people from their own land; However the concerns were unjustified as the grounds were only partially inaccessible, furthermore Tamworth Borough Council deemed the advantages to the town of Tamworth and surrounding area, fully justified the staging of the festival and realised the significance of putting Tamworth on the map.

Further controversy surrounded the billing of the festival as a 'live music event' amidst allegations that several of the major acts mimed during their sets in 2009 rather than performing live as billed: However this was proven not to be the case, with only 3 acts using backing tracks whilst singing live.

Saturday: Billy Ocean, Hot Chocolate, Hue and Cry, Kajagoogoo, Level 42, Aswad, Sister Sledge, Shakatak, Alexander O'Neal, The Christians

Sunday: Westlife, The Saturdays, Scouting for Girls, Alexandra Burke, Chipmunk, Tinie Tempah, Peter Andre, Taio Cruz, Olly Murs, McLean, Twist and Pulse, The Wanted, DJ Ironik, Connected (BGT Finalists) Everybody Looks Famous
