= Blue Rock Creek =

Stream in Ohio, United States

Coordinates: 39°47′30″N 81°54′25″W

Blue Rock Creek is a stream in the U.S. state of Ohio.

There are at least two creeks named Blue Rock Creek in Ohio. One flows into the Great Miami River near New Baltimore. It has gray-blue rocks all throughout it. The other one was so named on account of a blue rock near its mouth.

== See also ==
- List of rivers of Ohio
