= Marvellous Festivals =

Music festival

Coordinates: 51°25′34.8″N 0°52′44.9″W

- Genre: Rock and pop tribute acts
- Dates: 22–23 July (2 days)
- Locations: Dinton Pastures Country Park, Berkshire, UK
- Years active: 2003 – present
- Website: www.marvellousfestivals.com

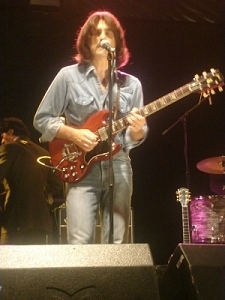
Andre Barreau of The Bootleg Beatles, playing live at "Marvellous Festivals" in Wellington Country Park, Reading, Berkshire, UK.

Marvellous Festivals is an annual single-stage music festival held in Dinton Pastures Country Park. The festival has been held since 2003.

== 2008 event ==
The 2008 event took place between 18 and 20 July. Acts included blues guitarist Larry Miller and tribute acts to bands such as Thin Lizzy, Bon Jovi, Led Zeppelin and Oasis.

=== Camping ===
2008 was the first year that attendees are able to camp. A 1,000-capacity camp site will be established adjacent to the concert arena.

== Previous events ==
=== 2007 event ===
2007 saw the return of The Bootleg Beatles, as well as tributes to The Rolling Stones, ABBA and The Eagles.

=== 2006 event ===
The 2006 event saw acts such as The Bootleg Beatles, and tributes to Queen, T.Rex and Fleetwood Mac. The festival ran for two days (22 and 23 July 2006)
