= Equinox Festival =

Annual music festival

Equinox festival is an annual music festival in Lincolnshire and has been going since 2016.

It is almost by definition the last music festival of the summer in the UK; it always being scheduled near to the autumnal equinox and therefore the end of meteorological summer.
