= Rhythm Festival =

Music festival in England

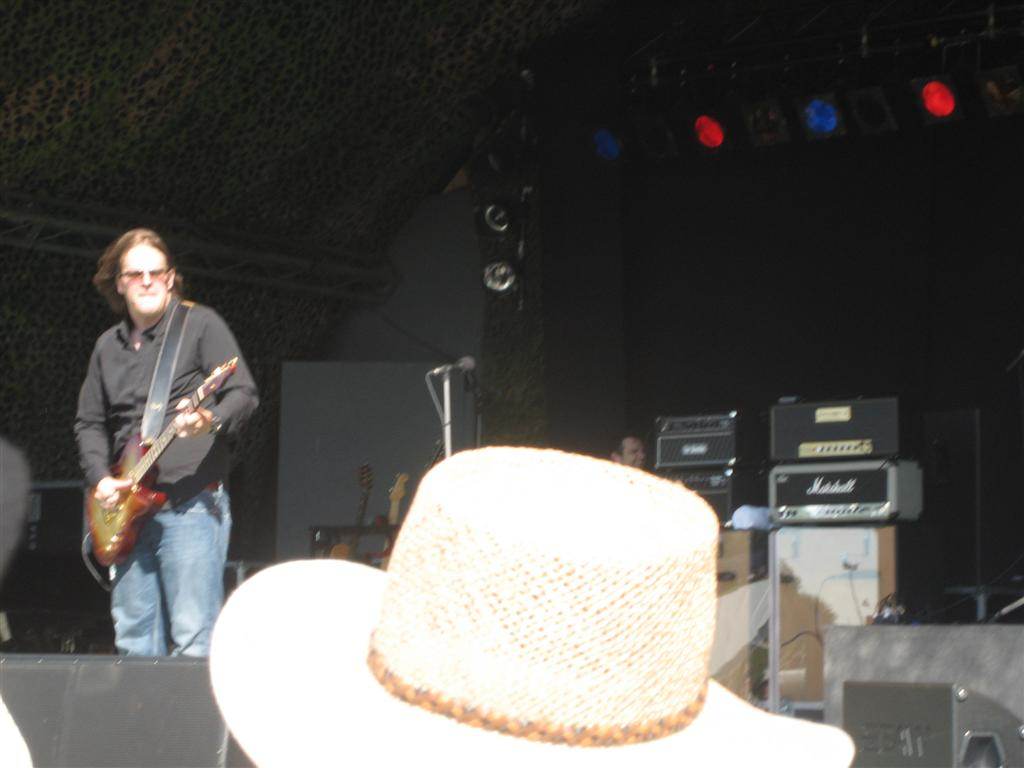
- US guitarist Joe Bonamassa at the 2007 Rhythm Festival
- Genre: music festival
- Dates: 2006-2011, 2012 cancelled
- Locations: Clapham, Bedfordshire, England, United Kingdom
- Founded: 2006

The Rhythm Festival was an outdoor music festival held in Bedfordshire. From 2006 until 2010 it was held at Twinwood Arena, near the village of Clapham In 2011 the festival moved to Shuttleworth House, Biggleswade. The 2012 Festival was due to take place over the August Bank Holiday weekend but was cancelled and the festival has not taken place since then.

Rhythm Festival was founded by music promoter Jim Driver. Music performances took place in three main venues (whose names changed regularly), with other smaller venues hosting DJs, cinema and "fringe" events. In 2007 Rhythm Festival was put forward for five categories in the UK Festival Awards. The festival is limited to an attendance of 5,000, and (according to director Jim Driver) is deliberately kept smaller and personal, aiming to be 'higher quality' than events like the Glastonbury Festival and the Isle of Wight Festival, and "aimed more towards the customer". In an interview with the BBC in 2006, Driver claimed to that "The musical policy of Rhythm Festival is simply to feature good music".

== History ==
- 2006 (3–5 August 2006) - Performers included Jerry Lee Lewis, Donovan, Arlo Guthrie, Roy Harper, Roger Chapman and the Shortlist, Seth Lakeman, Cara Dillon, The Blues Band, John Cooper Clarke and Jah Wobble. Famous Led Zeppelin guitarist Jimmy Page was due to play but was recovering from surgery at the time and was thus unable to appear.
- 2007 (4–6 August 2007) - Performers included Steve Harley & Cockney Rebel, Alabama 3, Dr John, Levellers, John Mayall & The Bluesbreakers, Joe Bonamassa, The Yardbirds, Prince Buster and Terry Reid who appeared with former Rolling Stone Mick Taylor. Ike Turner was due to play but pulled out of the festival.
- 2008 (29–31 August 2008) - Performers included Jefferson Starship, Saw Doctors, Richie Havens, Michelle Shocked, Big Star, Steve Cropper, Quicksilver Messenger Service, The Zombies, Chas and Dave, Jah Wobble, The Pretty Things, Nine Below Zero, Neville Staple and Gandalf Murphy and the Slambovian Circus of Dreams, The Foxes. Alton Ellis was due to appear but pulled out due to the illness from which he subsequently died.
- 2009 (21–23 August 2009) - Performers include The Proclaimers, Alabama 3, James Hunter, Strawbs, Martin Turner's Wishbone Ash, Terry Reid, Gandalf Murphy and the Slambovian Circus of Dreams, The Beat, Pentangle and Glenn Tilbrook & The Fluffers.
- 2010 (20–22 August 2010) - Performers include 10cc, Billy Bragg, Arlo Guthrie, The Wailers, Donovan, The Damned, Geno Washington & The Ram Jam Band, The Whybirds, Gandalf Murphy and the Slambovian Circus of Dreams, Roger Chapman and the Shortlist, Adrian Edmondson and the Bad Shepherds, Big 10 and Wilko Johnson.
- 2011 (26–28 August 2011) - Performers confirmed include Toots and the Maytals, Steve Cropper and The Animals, Imelda May, Nick Lowe, Buzzcocks, Dodgy, The Blockheads, The Burns Unit, From The Jam, Oysterband, and Sandi Thom.
