= Lindisfarne Festival =

Music and arts festival in England

Lindisfarne Festival is an annual music and creative arts festival which takes place in Northumberland, United Kingdom. The festival operates from Beal Farm, and is close to the coast, overlooking Lindisfarne Island (Holy Island), and Bamburgh Castle. The first Lindisfarne Festival took place over the weekend of 4 and 5 September 2015, with future events planned.

The initial event attracted almost 2,000 festival goers who were entertained by artists such as Public Service Broadcasting, Craig Charles, DJ Yoda, The Baghdaddies, alongside a host of other big local acts. In addition there were various other activities such as drumming, fire eaters, and Buddhist Monks.

The event is run by Farne Enterprises, directed by Conleth Maenpaa, with event operations ran by Field & Stage Ltd.
