= The Contrast (band) =

UK power pop band

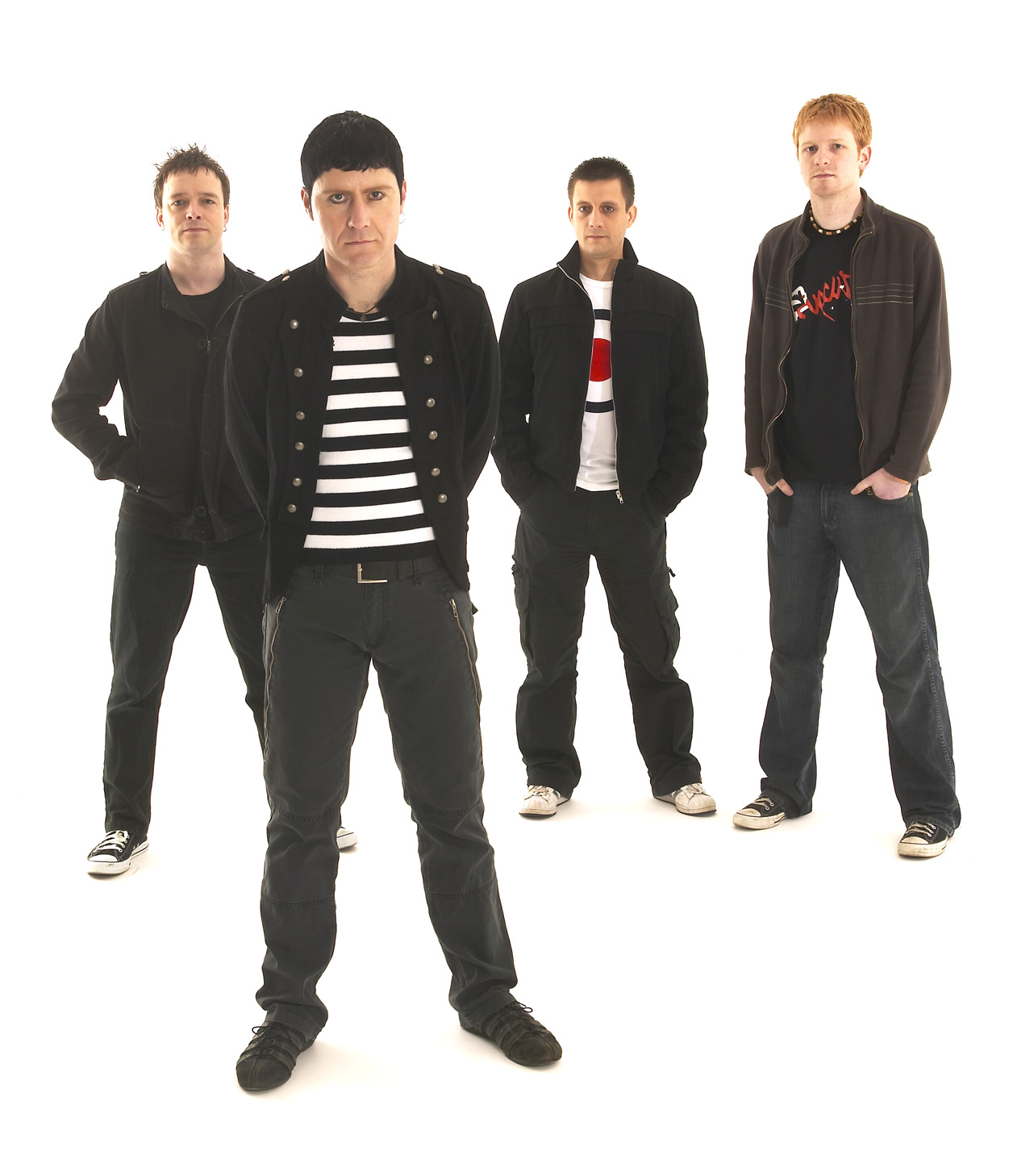

Background information
- Origin: UK
- Genres: Power pop, Rock, Garage Rock
- Years active: 1999–present
- Labels: Rainbow Quartz, Wicked Cool
- Members: David Reid; Richard 'Angus' Mackman; Thorin 'Fozzy' Dixon; Keiran Wade

The Contrast are a guitar power pop band based in Peterborough, Cambridgeshire, in the United Kingdom. It comprises David Reid, Chris Corney, and James Crossley.

They were formed in 1999 by David Reid and have since released five albums on the New York-based label Rainbow Quartz and two for Wicked Cool Records. Since the release of their second album Wireless Days, their music has been regularly played by Little Steven on his Underground Garage radio show. Little Steven once described them on air as "One of the best bands on the planet – and England too" and consequently invited them to play the Underground Garage Festival on Randall's Island in 2004. In May 2007, they released a new album called Underground Ghosts (also on Rainbow Quartz) that has since been regularly featured on Little Steven's Underground Garage show. A compilation of tracks from all of the Rainbow Quartz albums was released in 2007. This contains new and unreleased tracks and is the band's first release on Little Steven's "Wicked Cool" label. The band's song "Mystery #1" was featured on a Wicked Cool compilation album, The Coolest Songs In The World- Vol 2.

The Contrast's sixth album (the first full-length album for Wicked Cool Records and featuring Little Steven as executive producer), God of Malfunction, was released on 13 April 2010.

== Personnel ==
=== (2014–present) ===
The current line-up consists of:

- David Reid: vocals/lead guitar
- Thorin 'Fozzy' Dixon: drums
- Richard Mackman: bass/vocals
- Simon Russell: keyboards

=== Other members ===
- Kieran Wade: guitar/vocals
- Matthew Zilch: guitar/vocals (2004–2006)
- Andy Hawkins: drums/keyboards/vocals (2005)
- James Crossley: drums (1999–2004)
- Spencer Hart: guitar/vocals (2000–2004)
- Chris Corney: bass/vocals (1999–2000)
- Paul Blant: drums (1999)

=== Collaborators ===
- Spike Smith: drums (2005)
- Jo Parsons: drums (2004)

== Discography ==
=== Albums ===
==== Mystery #1 (Rainbow Quartz, 2000) ====
1. Perfect Disguise (3:56)
2. Short Term Memory (3:03)
3. 57 (3:35)
4. She's Been Here Before (2:28)
5. You Never Listen (2:31)
6. Mystery No. 1 (2:58)
7. Mad Professor (3:38)
8. Falldown (3:39)
9. Independence (4:53)
10. Turn Off the Sun (2:47)
11. Publicity Stunts (4:19)
12. Bad Dreams (2:59)
13. Remember (3:51)
14. Friend for a Day (2:56)

==== Wireless Days (Rainbow Quartz, 2002) ====
1. Can't Stand the Light (3:12)
2. Wireless Days (3:05)
3. Fortune (4:09)
4. Mask (2:32)
5. What You Want (3:03)
6. Ansaphone (2:47)
7. Unfair Game (3:05)
8. Charlie Grey (3:20)
9. Drop Dead Gorgeous Love Song (4:01)
10. Late Train (3:07)
11. Cover (4:14)
12. Elvis Fix (5:34)

==== Fade Back In (Rainbow Quartz, 2004) ====
1. Give Me One More Chance (3:02)
2. George Zipp (2:45)
3. Forget It (3:53)
4. The Guilty Party (3:25)
5. Catch the Spark (3:04)
6. Your Starring Role (3:40)
7. Functional Punk Pop Song (2:21)
8. Something Tells Me (5:03)
9. Flatpacked (2:26)
10. Smart (2:35)
11. Everything Seems to Get Me (3:22)
12. Disconnected (2:33)

==== Forget to Tell the Time (Rainbow Quartz, 2005) ====
1. Caught in a Trap (2:42)
2. Forget to Tell the Time (2:47)
3. Different Again (3:39)
4. Ink (2:45)
5. Adversity (4:08)
6. Side FX (2:27)
7. Mean (3:04)
8. Someone Else's Logo (2:43)
9. Hold Your Fire (4:12)
10. Care (2:22)
11. Big Dark Nowhere (3:50)
12. Trying to Fill the Space (3:48)
13. What You Have Done (3:39)
14. Be There (4:10)

==== Underground Ghosts (Rainbow Quartz, 2007) ====
1. Everyone's A Sucker
2. My Peace Of Mind
3. I've Known Your Name Forever
4. What Do I know
5. Pocketful Of Fear
6. Clue
7. Blast Off In Primetime
8. Something Isn't
9. Breaking Promises And Hearts
10. Shine
11. Believe
12. The World Of Being Wrong

==== Perfect Disguise: Introducing the Contrast (Wicked Cool Records, 2007) ====
1. Mystery #1
2. Mask
3. Unfair Game
4. World's So Different
5. Can't Stand The Light
6. Caught In A Trap
7. George Zipp
8. Perfect Disguise
9. Perfect Disguise (Acoustic)
10. Believe
11. How To Tell
12. Ansaphone
13. 57
14. Big Dark Nowhere
15. Disconnected
16. Mystery #1 (Acoustic)

==== God of Malfunction (Wicked Cool Records, 2010) ====
1. Underground Ghosts
2. Coming Back to Life
3. Take Me Apart
4. I Am An Alien
5. Gone Forever
6. God of Malfunction
7. Good Luck Charms
8. Better Than They Seem
9. She's A Disaster
10. Thought You Were Strong
11. Unexpected
12. False Admission

==== A Sinister Flick (Angel Air Records, 2013) ====
1. We Are The Monsters
2. Balloon Man
3. Mr Antenna
4. The Corndog King
5. Saving My breath
6. Heavens To Murgatroyd
7. Days Of Wonder
8. Doctor Strange
9. Johnny The Torch
10. Stick Man
11. A Sinister Flick
12. Mr Snake
13. Ghost Man
14. Incredible Girl
15. Maze Of Memories
16. There’s Always A Chance

==== Madhouse of Inventions (Secret Shark Records, 2018) ====
1. Bureaucrats
2. Madhouse of Inventions
3. The Holy Grail
4. Your Secret
5. Before This Caper Goes Down
6. The Vulture Squadron
7. What Do You Get
8. Pigless Head
9. Updates
10. Sinister London
11. Passion
12. Demons From Your Id
13. Atmosphere
14. River of Infra-Red Light
15. Intelligent Life
16. This Final Day
