= We Out Here Festival =

Annual music festival in England

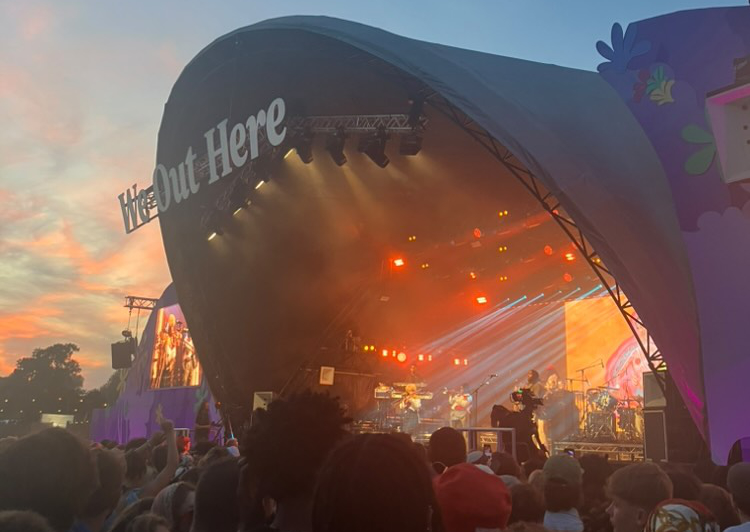
- We Out Here stage in 2025
- Genre: Jazz, Dance music
- Dates: Late August
- Locations: Wimborne St Giles, Dorset
- Years active: 2019–present
- Website: Official website

We Out Here is an annual music festival in England which focuses on jazz and dance music. It was hosted in Cambridge until 2023 when it moved to the Earl of Shaftesbury's Estate at Wimborne St Giles, and usually takes place over the late summer bank holiday in August. The festival has been curated by Gilles Peterson since it began in 2019.

== Origin ==
The festival was set up in 2019 by DJ and record label owner Gilles Peterson, with the name taken from a compilation his label Brownswood Recordings released a year prior.

== Reception ==
The festival has sold out for the majority of the years it has been active.

In 2026 the festival was listed on Time Out's "The best music festivals in Britain" and frequently features in other lists of the best UK music festivals.
