= RAF Twinwood Farm =

Former Royal Air Force station in Bedfordshire, England

RAF Twinwood Farm USAAF Station 506
- Near Bedford, Bedfordshire in England
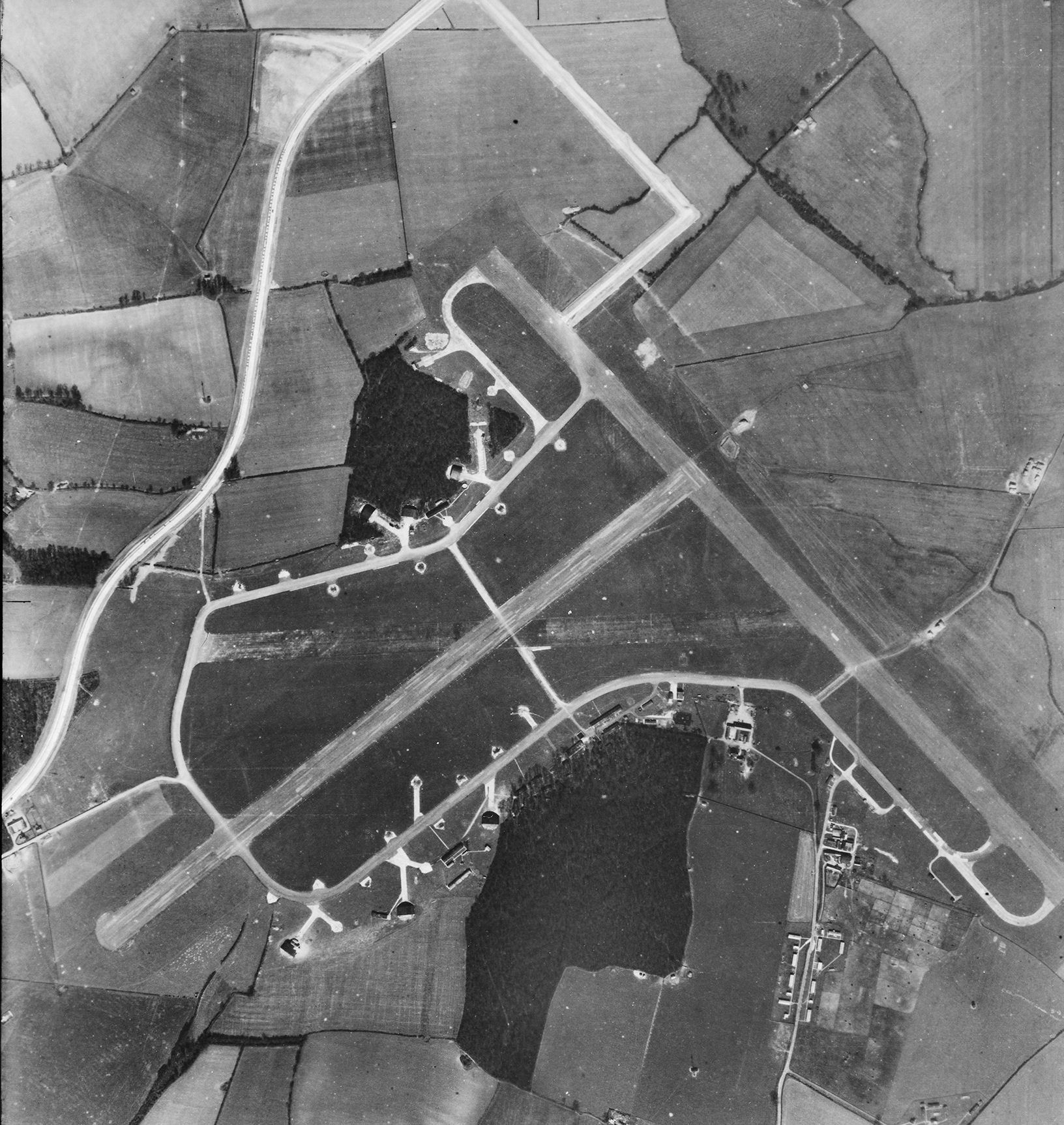
- Aerial photograph, 28 March 1948

Site information
- Type: RAF satellite station
- Code: TF
- Owner: Air Ministry
- Operator: Royal Air Force; United States Army Air Forces
- Controlled by: RAF Fighter Command 1942- * No. 9 Group RAF * No. 81 (OTU) Group RAF; Eighth Air Force
- Website: www.twinwoodairfield.co.uk

Location
- Shown within Bedfordshire RAF Twinwood Farm (the United Kingdom)
- Coordinates: 52°10′52″N 0°29′10″W

Site history
- Built: 1941/42
- In use: April 1942 - June 1945
- Battles/wars: European theatre of World War II

Airfield information
- Elevation: 275 feet (84 m) AMSL
Runways
Direction	Length and surface
00/00	Concrete
00/00	Concrete
00/00	Concrete

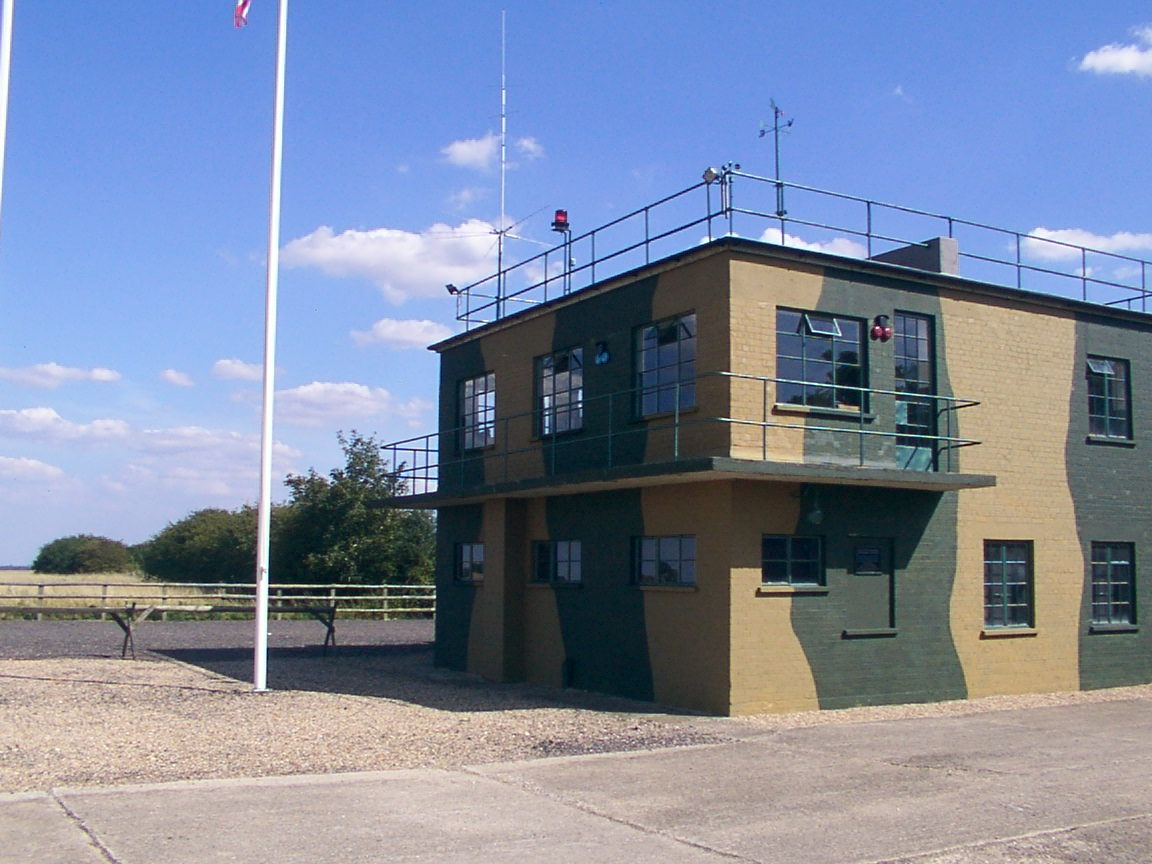
RAF Twinwood control tower (Watch Office), restored in 2002.

Royal Air Force Twinwood Farm or more simply RAF Twinwood Farm is a former Royal Air Force satellite station located on the outskirts of Clapham, 4 miles (6.4 km) north of Bedford in Bedfordshire, England. For the majority of World War II, the airfield was home to RAF night fighters.

== Royal Air Force use ==
Twinwood Farm opened in mid 1941 when the RAF began to use the grassed field. By April 1942 it had three concrete runways and additional temporary buildings.

From then until the end of the war the Bristol Blenheims, Bristol Beaufighters, Bristol Beauforts, Douglas Bostons and de Havilland Mosquitoes of No. 51 Operational Training Unit used 'Twinwoods', as it was generally known.

In March 1943 North American Mustangs belonging to 164, 169, 239 and 208 Squadrons RAF engaged in Operation Spartan which occurred between 1 and 12 March 1943 was conducted across southern and central England to test a wide range of procedures and tactics of British and Canadian Forces.

=== Units ===
- No. 26 Squadron RAF
- No. 268 Squadron RAF
- No. 613 Squadron RAF
- No. 169 Squadron RAF
- No. 239 Squadron RAF
- No. 164 Squadron RAF
- No. 14 Service Flying Training School RAF
- No. 19 Air Crew Holding Unit
- No. 2837 Squadron RAF Regiment
- Airborne Interception Conversion Flight RAF

== United States Army Air Forces use ==
In 1944 the airfield was transferred to the U.S. Eighth Air Force and operated in conjunction with the nearby RAF Thurleigh.

The airfield closed in June 1945.

== Major Glenn Miller, U.S. Army (Air Corps) ==
Glenn Miller served as a major in the US Army Air Forces and commanded the Army Air Forces Band (Special). At the request of General Eisenhower, Miller and his unit deployed to Europe during June 1944 for the missions of allied radio broadcasting and personal appearances. They were stationed with the Eighth Air Force Service Command (VIII AFSC) near Bedford for the purpose of broadcasting from the BBC facilities there, although the unit also broadcast from London. Meanwhile, they performed at many air bases across the UK.

By December 1944, SHAEF was moving the unit from England to France, and ordered Miller ahead to complete arrangements. Scheduled flights from Bovingdon were canceled due to bad weather in France. On 15 December 1944, Miller accepted an invitation from Lt. Col. Norman Baessell of the VIII AFSC to ride with him to France aboard his Noorduyn UC-64 Norseman piloted by Flight Officer Stuart Morgan. Miller's travel orders did not authorise him to board a "casual" flight and he did not report his intentions to his chain of command, so SHAEF was unaware of Miller's whereabouts. Although the RAF Training Unit at Twinwood had stood down, the aerodrome was open. At 13:45 Morgan landed at Twinwood, boarded Baessell and Miller, and took off at 13:55. The UC-64 and its occupants were never seen again.

On 20 January 1945, an Eighth Air Force Board of Inquiry determined that the aeroplane went down over the English Channel due to a combination of human error, mechanical failure and weather. Remains of the UC-64 have never been found and Major Glenn Miller remains Missing In Action to the present day. The names of all three missing servicemen are inscribed in the Tablets of the Missing at Cambridge American Cemetery and Memorial. Major Miller is listed as Alton G. Miller.

== Current use ==
The site is now home to the Twinwood Arena, a large natural amphitheatre which plays host to various music festivals promoted by Twinwood Events including the Rhythm Festival.

=== Glenn Miller Museum ===
The Glenn Miller Museum is located in the restored control tower and features displays about Glenn Miller, RAF Twinwood Farm, and the Second World War.

Other buildings house different displays including:

- Twinwood Aviation Museum – featuring uniforms and artifacts recovered from German and Allied aircraft crash sites, as well as British aviation units and life in Britain during the war.
- Rooms of a 1940s family home
- Axis Museum – recreation of a German bunker, Russian and German artillery and weapons, and a display about Winston Churchill and the British royal family
- Fire Service Museum – recreated 1940s wartime fire station with uniforms, equipment and vehicles
- Displays of military vehicles

The group of museums are also known as Twinwood Airfield Museum, and are open seasonally.

== See also ==
- RAF Thurleigh – a nearby RAF station
- RAE Bedford – a Royal Aircraft Establishment research facility at RAF Thurleigh
- List of former Royal Air Force stations
