= Bourne Festival =

Annual music event held in Bourne, England

Coordinates: 52.766°N 0.379°W

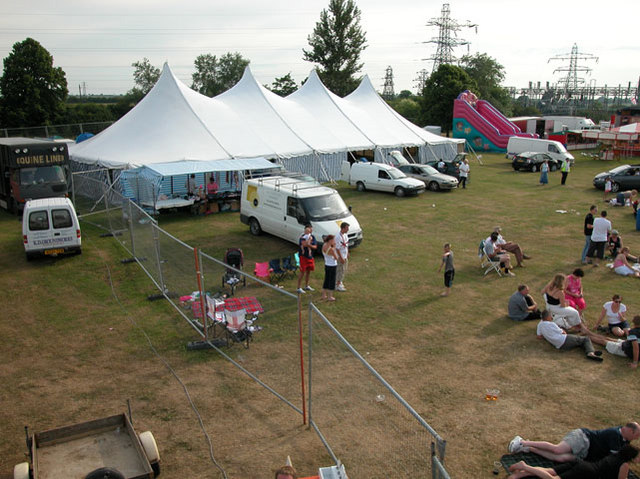
- The 2006 festival
- Genre: Rock, Punk, Indie, Acoustic, Dance
- Dates: First weekend following Spring Bank Holiday
- Locations: Bourne, Lincolnshire, England
- Years active: 2002–present
- Founders: Bourne & District Round Table 896
- Website: www.bournefestival.com

Bourne Festival is an annual music event held in Wellhead Park in the market town of Bourne, Lincolnshire, England.

The festival is a charity event organised by Bourne and District Round Table 896, a member of the National Association of Round Tables of Great Britain and Ireland. It was first held in 2002 in celebration of the Queen's Golden Jubilee, and was originally a collaboration between The Queen's Golden Jubilee Committee and Bourne Round Table, reviving the previously held '999 Galas'. The Bourne and District Round Table has run the festival with the help of volunteers as an annual event on the first weekend following the Spring Bank Holiday. Since the first festival in 2002, more than £250,000 has been raised for local and national charities, and individuals.

The Festival includes live music from all genres. The headlining acts have included Doctor and the Medics. Since 2010 the event has included a battle of the bands competition for up-and-coming talent under the age of 18.
