= Strawberry Fair =

Local, free-admittance festival held in Cambridge, England, in early June

Coordinates: 52.210°N 0.130°E

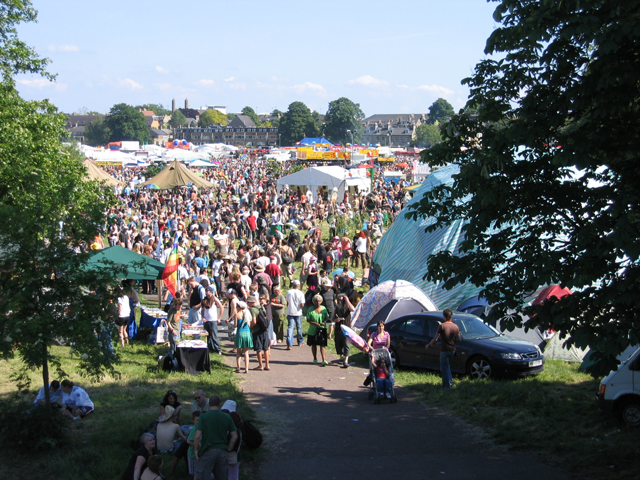
Strawberry Fair 2007.

Strawberry Fair is a local free festival of music, entertainments, arts and crafts which has been held in Cambridge, England, since 1974.

The fair is held on Midsummer Common on the first Saturday in June and is completely run and organised by volunteers from a wide range of different backgrounds. It is believed to be one of the UK's biggest free to enter volunteer-run festivals.

It has been held most years since 1974, except for:

- 2010, when it was cancelled due to licensing issues. To address these, a perimeter fence has been erected around the fair for crowd control purposes since 2011, with checkpoints at the gates for excessive alcohol, drugs and weapons. As of 2022, the alcohol limit is four cans of alcohol per person, and no spirits are allowed.
- 2020 and 2021 due to the global COVID-19 pandemic. In January 2022 the fair's website said: Strawberry Fair will be back on 11 June 2022 after the longest break in its history with the theme Love the Planet.
- 2025 due to financial pressures.

Approximately 30,000 attend the fair each year.

Entry to the fair is free.

== Strawberry Fair 2026 ==
The financial pressures that prevented Strawberry Fair going ahead in 2025 still remain, fundraising activities to ensure the fair can take place in 2026 include:

- An appeal for donations
- Strawberry Preserve (a series of benefit gigs held at venues around Cambridge) and other benefit gigs.
- T-Shirt Sales
- Invitations to local companies and organisations to support and sponsor the fair.

== Music and art ==
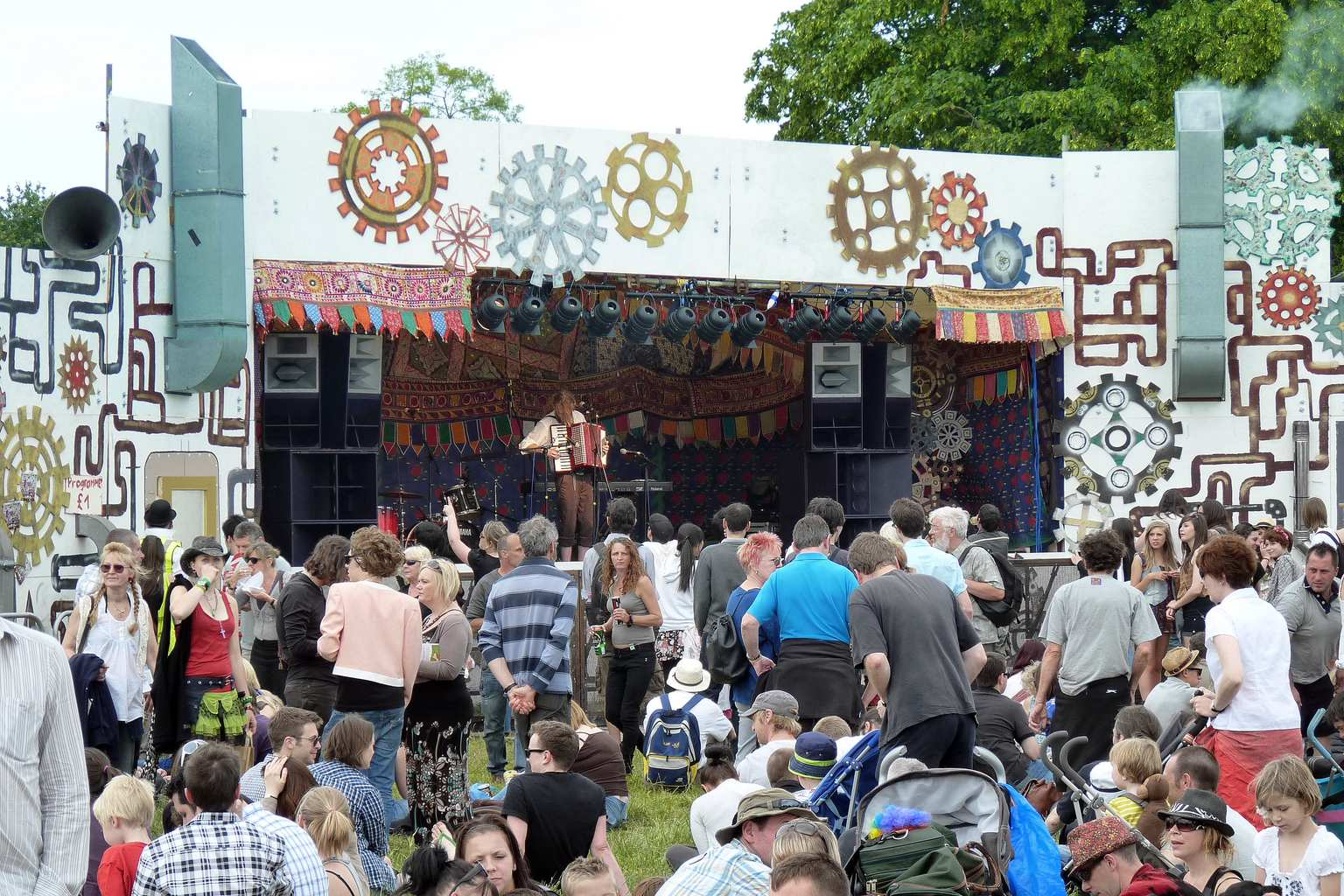
The steampunk-themed stage at Strawberry Fair 2011.

A range of musical genres are represented at the fair across several music stages and areas, with local bands given preference.

Children are catered for with the Kids Park free entertainments area, which includes face painters, a family friendly café, a marquee of activities such as painting and crafts, storytelling and other attractions.

An Arts area also allows local art to be displayed and for visitors to the fair to try something new.

The fair starts with a parade featuring colourful costumes and samba bands which follows a route through Cambridge, making its way to Midsummer Common, its arrival signalling the start of festivities.

- The 2011 parade was part of the UK Centre for Carnival Arts 'Carnival Crossroads' project.

== Stalls ==
The fair typically has around 300 stalls selling a wide range of food and goods, the fees from which provide a large proportion of the fair's income, allowing it to retain free entry for all attendees.

== Music stages ==
Strawberry Fair does not have a main stage as such. However, each year one area is selected to host the "Finale". Music on most stages runs from Midday until 22:30, apart the stage which is hosting the finale, which closes at 23:00.

- In 2022, Zion Train performed the finale on the Rebel Love stage.
- In 2023, the finale was held on Centre Stage with The Treatment closing the day.

Current music stages (can also befound on the official website under Areas and Events).

- Centre Stage - Showcasing the best local talent from the Cambridge Band Competition.
- Plastic Den - Cambridge Electronic music.
- Portland Stage & Bar - Upcoming local musicians, named due to the community support provided by the Portland Arms bar.
- Revolting Youth - Under 18s bands and youth talent.
- Shady Nasties / Rebel Love - Ska, Punk, Funk, Rock, Alternative, Drum and Bass.
- Cambridge 105 Radio - Local musicians and a few radio presenters from Cambridge 105 Radio
- The Flying Pig - Cajun, Americana, Funk, Blues, Rock and Roll, Folk, Jazz and Country Art Rock
- Scarecrow Corner - Anarcho Punk, Psychedelic, Folk, Reggae and Dance
- Cambuskers - Buskers and Street performers
- The Village Green - Comedy, Poetry, Dance, Acting
- Random Bullshit Generator - Games and Electronic, Dance

Previous year's stages have included:

- A Village Green area with traditional community activities such as re-enactment displays, It's A Knockout, fancy dress pageant and a grand finale.
- The Wigwam Stage.
- Hatter's Cafe
- Colonel Maybey's Mechanical Menagerie (a 'steam diesel punk' area)

== Organisation ==
In the constitution, the object of the fair is described thus:

"The object of the Fair shall be to hold a Fair, called Strawberry Fair, annually on Midsummer Common, Cambridge, on the first (1st) Saturday in June, for the benefit of the local community, particularly the children. The Fair shall have free entry and entertainments, including music and theatre."

The fair is run by a committee of local people who elect a Chair, Vice-chair, Treasurer, and Secretary each year in September/October to form a Steering Group. Sub-committees also operate in order to discuss specific areas of the fair's operation, namely Programming, Finance and Admin, Policy and Community, and Site. The heads of these sub-committees report back at monthly General Meetings - weekly closer to the fair - which provides accountability and allows for the approval (or otherwise) of proposals put forward by the sub-committees.

Approximately 1000 people volunteer their time to make Strawberry Fair happen, which is seen by the committee as one of its strongest attributes. These volunteers include members of the committee itself, stewards, an environment team, area coordinators, stage managers, backstage staff, stalls coordinators and many people 'behind the scenes' who undertake administration and other tasks.

The fair can only remain a free event because of its volunteers. Income from stalls meets infrastructure and overhead costs.

Additionally, benefit gigs are held throughout the year to raise money (for example, Strawberry Sundae). The local bands that play these gigs usually also play on the day of the fair.

== Band competition ==
Strawberry Fair also organise and run the Cambridge Band Competition which has been running since 1984. Heats are held each year in The Portland Arms music venue, with the final at Cambridge Junction. All finalists in the Cambridge Band Competition also get invited to play at the Fair.

First aid is usually provided by RTC Medical Solutions Ltd, and there is an on-site welfare tent.

== Merchandise ==
Strawberry Fair merchandise - including T-shirts, badges, programmes and posters - is sold from Information Tents on Fair days and at benefit and band competition heats and final.

In 2019 the theme of the Fair was "Love".

== See also ==
- Stourbridge fair
- List of strawberry topics
