= The Kabeedies =

- Origin: Norwich, England
- Genres: Post-punk revival Indie rock Alternative rock
- Years active: 2008–2013
- Labels: Cherryade; Cool for Cats; Rimeout (Japan); Fierce Panda
- Website: thekabeedies.blogspot.com

The Kabeedies were an English Indie, Afrobeat/alternative rock band from Norwich and Woodbridge, England.

== History ==
The band was composed of Katie Allard (Vocals), Evan Jones (Guitar/Vocals), Rory Hill (Bass Guitar/Vocals) and Francis "Fab" Bell (Drums).

The Kabeedies released their debut album Rumpus on 9 November 2009 on NRone records and have toured extensively in the UK and Europe since their beginnings in 2007. They played Glastonbury Festival in 2008, and many more festivals including Latitude Festival, Dockville Festival (Hamburg) and Wickerman Festival. They've also supported several acts including Darwin Deez, The Futureheads, Bombay Bicycle Club, The Pigeon Detectives and CSS – who invited them to join them on tour for three more shows.

In 2008, they also recorded live radio sessions for Huw Stephens (BBC Radio 1), Marc Riley (BBC 6music) and Janice Long (BBC Radio 2).

Their song "Come On", originally a B-side to debut single "Lovers Ought To" on Cherryade Records, was included on the Microsoft Xbox Kinect adverts worldwide.

Their second album Soap was released in late February 2012. In July 2012, vocalist Katie Allard left the band. Jones, Hill and Bell have since formed the indie rock band, Keep Up.
