= Celtic Blue Rock Community Arts Festival =

The Celtic Blue Rock Community Arts Festival (known as Blue Rock to locals) is a charity-based festival showcasing local bands, craftsmen and stalls in Llanfyrnach, Wales. From small beginnings in 2004, it has grown to be an annual event attracting 10,000 people.

The festival made the news in 2010 when it was cancelled after it lost its licence due to safety concerns.

Performers included former Hawkwind band member Nik Turner, Thunder Chair, Johnny Action Finger, Session Head, Quantum Beats and The Measurements Group, as well as a number of local bands performing Dance, Trance and Drum and Bass.
