= The Dirty Tricks =

- Origin: Montreal, Quebec, Canada
- Genres: Indie rock
- Years active: 2003–2010
- Labels: Blue Skies Turn Black; L'Écurie Musique

The Dirty Tricks are a Canadian rock band formed in Montreal, Quebec, Canada in 2003.

(Not to be confused with "Dirty Tricks", a rock band that recorded for Polydor Records 1975–1977)

They toured with Malajube (Dare to Care Records), The Sainte Catherines (Fat Wreck Chords) and shared the stage with established bands such as NOFX, Against Me!, The (International) Noise Conspiracy and many more.

Their first single was the theme song of the skateboarding TV program called The Under Attack Show, aired on Musique Plus and Razer channel (now known as MTV2). Two other songs were used on Fast Cars and Superstars: The Gillette Young Guns Celebrity Race on ABC.

The Dirty Tricks have 4 albums out, won a MIMI award in 2008 and were nominated twice for a GAMIQ award. Considered as one of the best underground rock band coming out of Montreal.

== Discography ==
=== Singles ===
Year	Title
2009	"Double Vision"

=== Albums ===
Year	Album
2003	Bloody Breakfast
2005	Demerits
2007	Sauve qui peut!

== See also ==
- Music of Canada
- Canadian rock
- List of bands from Canada
