= Scrape =

Scrape, scraper or scraping may refer to:

== Biology and medicine ==
- Scrape, mild abrasion (medicine), a type of injury
- Scraper (biology) or grazer-scraper, a water animal that feeds on stones and other substrates by grazing algae, microorganism and other matter
- Scrape nest or scrape, a depression in the ground, bare of soil, which is used as a bird nest
- Cloud-scraping cisticola, a common name for the Cisticola dambo bird species
- Scrapers, a common name for Capoeta, a genus of cyprinid fish
- Tongue cleaner, a hygiene device and product used to clean the tongue

== Computing ==
- Data scraping, a technique in which a computer program extracts data from human-readable output coming from another program
  - Screen scraping, a method through which a program captures information from a display not intended for processing by computers
  - Web scraping, extracting information from a website, for analysis or reuse, most effectively by a web crawler
  - Scraper site, a website created by web scraping
- Tracker scrape, request sent to a BitTorrent tracker

== Hand tools ==
- Scraper (archaeology), a stone tool
- Scraper (kitchen), a cooking tool
- Card scraper or cabinet scraper, a tool for scraping wood
- Hand scraper, a single-edged tool used to scrape metal from a surface
- Ice scraper, a handheld tool for removing frost, ice, and snow from windows
- Paint scraper, a hand tool to remove paint or other coatings from a substrate
- Boot scraper, an item of ironmongery used to scrape mud off boots

== Machines and vehicles ==
- Fresno scraper, a canal/ditch-digging machine pulled by horses
- Wheel tractor-scraper, land scraper, or scraper, a type of heavy equipment used for earth-moving
- Scraper bike, a type of bicycle that has been modified by its owner
- Scraper (car), a modified American-made family car characterized by large rims and extensive personalization

== Music and audio ==
- Rake-and-scrape, a type of Caribbean music
- Scrape flutter, in sound recording, high-frequency flutter over 100 Hz
- Scraper (instrument), a percussion instrument
- Pick scrape, a guitar technique

=== Works of music ===
- "Scrape" (Blue Stahli song), a 2009 non-album single by Blue Stahli
- "Scrape", a 2017 song by Chelsea Wolfe from Hiss Spun
- "Scrape", a 2017 song by Future from his self-titled album
- "Scrape", a 2010 song by Kurupt from Streetlights
- Scraping (album), a 2002 rock music album by Calexico
- "Scraped", a 2008 song by Guns N' Roses from Chinese Democracy

== Other uses ==
- Scraperboard, an artistic engraving technique
- Skyscraper, a very tall building
- Scraper, former name of Sparrowhawk, Oklahoma, a census-designated place in Cherokee County, Oklahoma, United States

== See also ==
- Scrap
- Scrapie
- Skraypers
