= Foxes Faux =

English band

- Origin: Keighley, West Yorkshire, UK
- Genres: Folk, Punk, Rock
- Years active: 2009–2024
- Members: Kurt Wood; Luke Yates; Will Quinn; Damian Curran; Ben Snowden; Luke Parker
- Website: Bandcamp Instagram Facebook

Foxes Faux were an English band that play a mixture of folk, punk and rock music. They formed in Keighley, West Yorkshire, England and played their first gig at Victoria Hall in their home town in January 2009. Originally, they choose to busk or play acoustically over traditional gigs. They also have become well known for playing additional acoustic sets after their typical PA gigs have finished. Since adding a rock rhythm section, they have almost exclusively played pub and club gigs.

In September 2012, the band independently released their debut self-titled EP. In 2015 they released their 13-track debut album Fox Tales through Drawing Board Records and Bomber Music to rave reviews in a mixture of folk, rock, punk and country publications. In July 2017, they released their second album Big Ifs preceded by singles 'Treacle Mile' and 'You Got Me All Wrong'. In 2024, the band announced the release of their third album 'Scarper!'.

== History ==
The band was initially formed in 2006 as a side project by Keighley punk rock band Sounds of Swami. The four members wrote some new acoustic-based songs and performed acoustic cover versions of their own songs. They did this to fill lengthy Pub gig slot's whilst raising money to record their debut EP Vent. After sporadic writing and gigging, the band finally detached itself from the Sounds of Swami name and added additional instrumentation to build on its already burgeoning folk and country sound. The band named themselves Foxes Faux, wrote brand new songs and played their first performance at a charity gig in January 2009.

The band released their debut double A single 'Rioters Queue Here' / 'Su Hermoso' on 10 September 2011 as a free digital download. The release was to coincide with their first play on BBC Radio York. BBC Presenter Jenny Eells praised 'Rioters Queue Here' and their live show having seen them perform at the Beat-Herder Festival. The band released 'Hey Ya' with 'Intranjo / Banountro' as the B-Side in December 2011 again as a free download.

The band have become regulars at the Working Men's Tent at the renown Beat-Herder Festival; performing the same slot before Captain Hotknives in 2008 (as Sounds of Swami Acoustic), 2009, 2010 and 2011. Their performance has become a Sunday evening tradition and the band performed to a packed out tent in 2011. Their 2010 performance is memorable for mandolin player / singer Kurt Wood crowd surfing from the stage to the bar (to order a can of lager) and back whilst the band performed their Banjo-led song 'Intranjo/Banjountro'. The crowd was set the challenge of getting him to the bar and back before the band finished the song; a feat they achieved to roaring applause. A picture of the event taken by Danny Payne made it to No. 3 in the NME's 'Top 10 Independent Festival Photos' competition.

Foxes Faux have supported noteworthy acts New Model Army, Franz Nicolay, Babar Luck, Ghost Mice, The Skints and Johnny Foreigner and have performed at Leeds O2 Arena, Beat Herder Festival, Strummercamp Festival, Bingley Music Live and The Aire Do.

A demo version of 'Liars' was circulated across popular social network Facebook which led to mass interest. Mike Harding, presenter of the Radio 2 Folk show shared the song commenting it's "a cracking track in my opinion".

In February 2015, the band released their debut album Fox Tales to rave reviews. Touring behind the album, they have performed across the UK, Northern Ireland, Germany, Austria, Italy and France.

In July 2017, they released their second album Big Ifs preceded by singles 'Treacle Mile' and 'You Got Me All Wrong'.

In 2024, the band announced the release of their third album 'Scarper!' whilst also announcing their split after a sold-out gig in their hometown of Keighley on 2 February.

== Discography ==
=== Albums ===
- Scarper! (2024)
- Big Ifs (2017)
- Fox Tales (2015)

=== EP's ===
- Foxes Faux (2012)

=== Singles ===
- Penny Arcade / Burn The Witch (2022)
- You Got Me All Wrong (2017)
- Treacle Mile (2017)
- Do I Waste My Time (2016)
- Liars (2015)
- Cops and Robbers (2015)
- Isabella (2015)
- Rioters Queue Here (2014)

== Members ==
- Kurt Wood – Vocals, Mandolin, Guitar, Banjo, Melodica
- Luke Antonik-Yates - Violin, Guitar, Keys, Vocals
- Will Quinn – 12 String Acoustic Guitar, Banjo, Vocals
- Damian Curran – Mandolin, Banjo, Keys, Vocals
- Ben Snowden – Electric Bass, Harmonica, Vocals
- Tim Rickaby – Bouzouki, Glockenspiel, Melodica, Electric Guitar
- Luke Parker – Drum Kit, Percussion, Guitar, Vocals
