= Halcyon Days (Sounds of Swami EP) =

Halcyon Days EP

EP by Sounds of Swami
- Released: 2009
- Recorded: 2009
- Genre: Punk, rock, progressive, hardcore punk
- Length: 8.34
- Label: Drawing Board Records; TNSrecords
- Producer: Luke Yates; Sounds of Swami

Sounds of Swami chronology
Vent EP (2008)	Halcyon Days EP (2009)	Jack (single) (2011)

The Halcyon Days EP is the second official release by the English punk rock band Sounds of Swami. After the success of their Vent EP, the band began work on their first album. After a positive EP review in an issue of TNS Zine, the Manchester zine started a record label TNSrecords and offered the band a one-off split record deal with two of their roster bands. The band reluctantly declined in favour of saving new songs for the planned album.

Months later, the idea of writing and recording songs in a hardcore punk style as a one-off release came to fruition with three of the six songs being written in one session. The songs emphasised their more hardcore punk side with influences including Bad Brains, Minor Threat, Black Flag, Gorilla Biscuits and Dead Kennedys affecting the overall sound of the EP.

The band approached TNSrecords about the project in the run-up to their first album and co-released the EP physically on 7-inch vinyl and digitally on iTunes. Both formats are a first for the band. To much surprise, Halcyon Days generated rave reviews on the underground punk circuit and gained high recognition from mainland Europe.

== Track listing ==
Side A

1. "Briefcase of Ignorance"
2. "Lapels"
3. "Look At Me"

Side B

1. "Bandwagon Hi-Jack"
2. "The Clue Is In The Title"
3. "Your Name Not Here"

== Personnel ==
- Kurt Wood – vocals, guitar, percussion
- Luke Yates – vocals, guitar, Percussion
- Rob Gilbert – vocals, bass guitar
- Matthew Wade – drums
- Tim Rickaby – insert art, photography
- Christopher Thomas – cover art
