= Trunk Boiz =

American hip hop group

- Origin: Oakland, California, U.S.
- Genres: Hip hop; hyphy; West Coast hip hop

The Trunk Boiz are a rap group from Oakland, California. The collective consists primarily of the artists F.A. Tha Jefe and B*Janky and previously Arty Bo, but has included other artists, producers, dancers and more over the years. Trunk is an acronym for "Trunk-Rattlin' Unique Nonstop Knock". They were one of the first rap groups to attain commercial success from the burgeoning scraper bike scene of the Bay Area of California. Their first hit, Scraper Bike, introduced mainstream America to scraper bikes, a distinct type of bicycle (inspired by the scraper car style) ridden in Oakland, California, specifically East Oakland, and became one of the earliest internet viral videos, with the YouTube video "Scraper Bike" racking up millions of views by September 2008.

National Public Radio discussed the phenomenon on both Weekend Edition and California Report, stating that Scraper Bike "attracted a cult following," with the video having "spawned what is becoming a worldwide movement, even as it changed the lives of the young men who customized the bikes and made the video." After their first hit they saw further local success with their 2010 Bay Area classic "Cupcake No Fillin", which they later appeared on a remix of from up-and-coming Oakland artist Seiji Oda in 2025. The Trunk Boiz performed with Kehlani at her sold-out show at Fox Oakland Theatre in 2016.
