= Hi-riser =

Customized automobile with large wheels

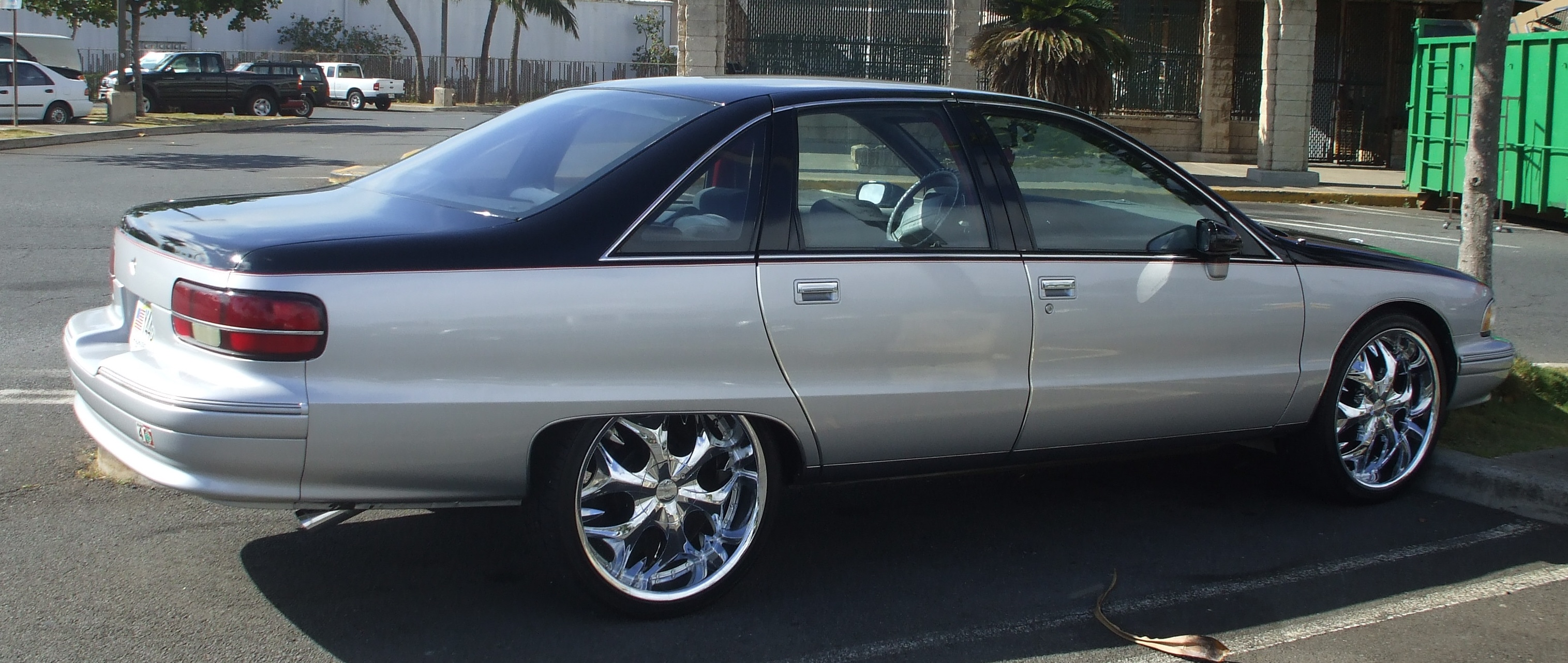
A fourth generation Chevrolet Caprice hi-riser. This model Caprice is commonly known by the term "bubble" due to its rounded style.

Hi-risers are a type of heavily-customized automobile, typically a full-size, body-on-frame, rear-wheel drive American sedan. They are modified by significantly increasing the vehicle's ground clearance, and adding large-diameter wheels with low-profile tires. Depending on the model, year and bodystyle, cars customized in this style can be labeled "donk", "box" or "bubble". Many within the community refer to this style of car as simply a "big rim" or "big wheel" car.

== Overview ==
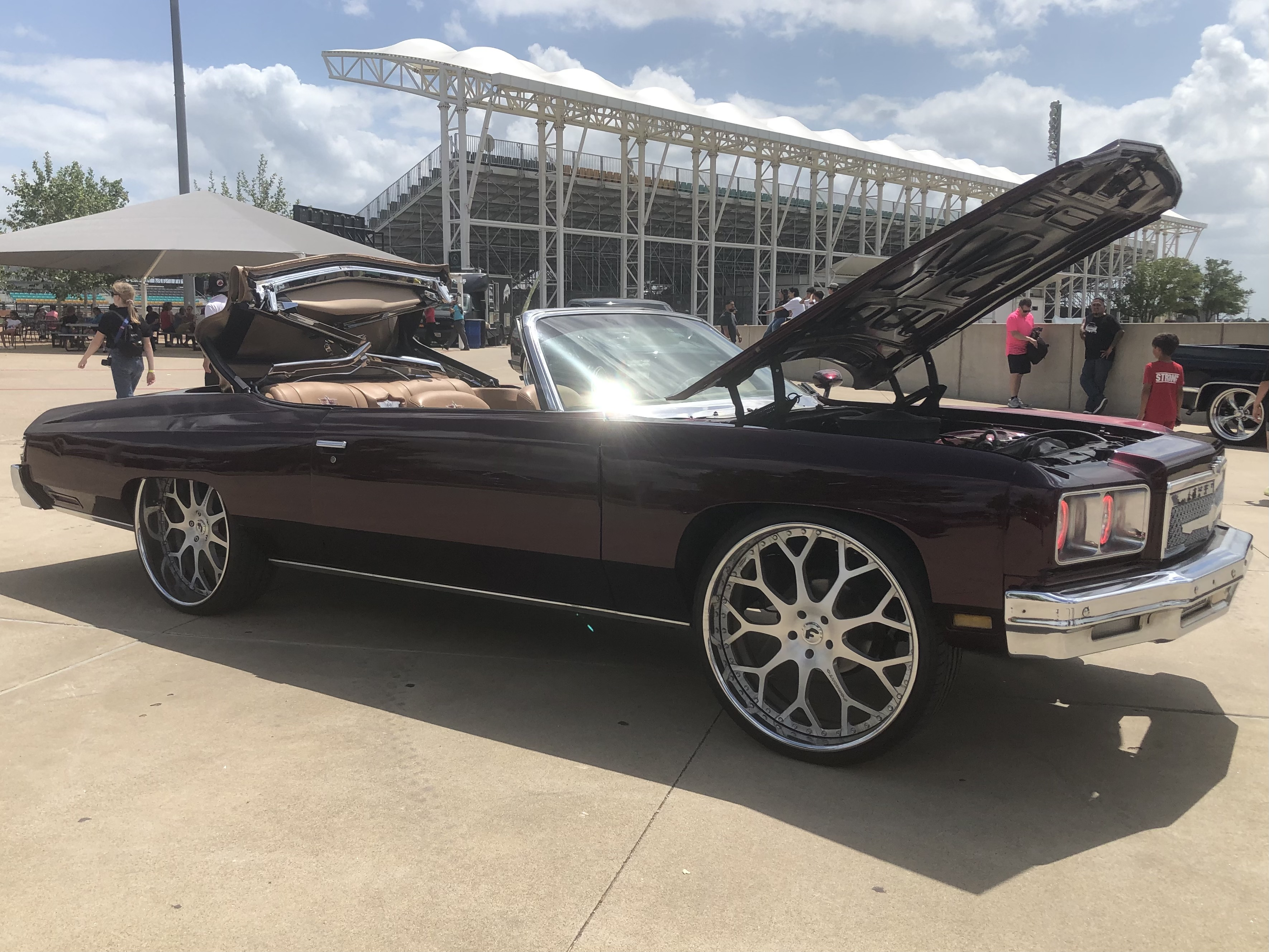
1971-1976 Chevrolet Caprice convertible "Donk" on Forgiato wheels with custom paint, grille, headlights, and interior

Hi-risers originally grew out of the African American Dirty South subculture, originating in Miami, Florida, but the trend has spread across the United States. Vehicles customized in this style are distinguished by their oversized wheels, ranging from 20 inches to 30 inches or more in diameter (with the largest being 50 inch). A number of wheel companies make wheels in larger sizes specifically for hi-risers, including Asanti, Dub, Forgiato, Lexani, and more. Suspension modifications similar to those employed on lifted pickup trucks are made to give adequate clearance for the large wheels. Often the suspension is modified so the front end sits slightly higher than the rear end. Other common modifications include custom paint-jobs, interiors, headlights, and trim; custom audio equipment; engine swaps and other performance upgrades; steering wheels that match the design of the wheels; and radiused fenders to fit the larger wheels. Other names for hi-risers and donks include "skyscrapers" due to their height, as well as simply being referred to as "big rim" or "big wheel" cars by people within the community.

Groups such as the National Donk Racing Association organize drag racing events specifically for cars with big wheels. Cars entering these events typically have a host of performance upgrades in addition to their visual modifications, including and are usually set up similarly to traditional drag cars.

Most enthusiasts agree that a "donk" traditionally is a 1971-1976 Chevrolet Impala or Caprice. They were given this name because the "Impala" logo was referred to as a "donkey" by owners, or "donk" for short. Other common terms include "box" or "box Chevy", which typically refers to a malaise era Impala or Caprice sedan with a boxy design, and "bubble", which typically refers to a 1990s Chevrolet Caprice or Impala.

The most popular vehicles for these types of modifications are late 20th century, full-size, rear wheel drive sedans and coupes manufactured by General Motors, particularly the Chevrolet Impala, Chevrolet Caprice, Buick Roadmaster, Oldsmobile 98, Cadillac DeVille, Cadillac Seville, Cadillac Fleetwood, Cadillac Fleetwood Brougham, and Cadillac Brougham, as well as mid-size cars such as the Chevrolet Monte Carlo, Buick Century, and Oldsmobile Cutlass Supreme. Other commonly used platforms include full-size Ford models such as the Ford Crown Victoria, Lincoln Town Car, and Mercury Grand Marquis; Chrysler and Dodge models such as the 300, Charger (2005), and Dodge Challenger (2008); and various models of SUVs and pickup trucks, notably the Cadillac Escalade.

== Music style and slang ==
Hi-risers are an integral part of the music scenes in Indianapolis, St. Louis, the East Coast, the Central U.S., and Miami. Donk riders and rappers from this area in particular also share unique styles of slang and clothing. In South Florida, drivers of cars that would otherwise be considered classic and have had their stock tires replaced with 24s, are referred to as donk riders. The expression is thought to have originated with rapper Trick Daddy, who hails from the Miami neighborhood of Liberty City. One prominent donk rider style in the South Florida area pairs dreadheads with gold teeth, and has spread throughout Florida over the years.

== Technical challenges ==
Raising a vehicle off of the ground by such a degree raises the center of mass to a point where rolling the vehicle becomes a distinct possibility. The suspension modifications required are often meant for trucks and larger vehicles. If the vehicle's brakes have not been upgraded to compensate for the significant increase in wheel diameter, its braking ability will be greatly diminished. If the vehicle turns too fast, the weight of the vehicle may shift to extremes that were never considered for the vehicle in question, which may result loss of traction or damage to the vehicle. If not done the right way by a skilled technician, a wheel could come off while driving, resulting in significant damage to anything it hits. If done properly, it should handle in a similar fashion to a lifted truck or SUV.

== Gallery ==
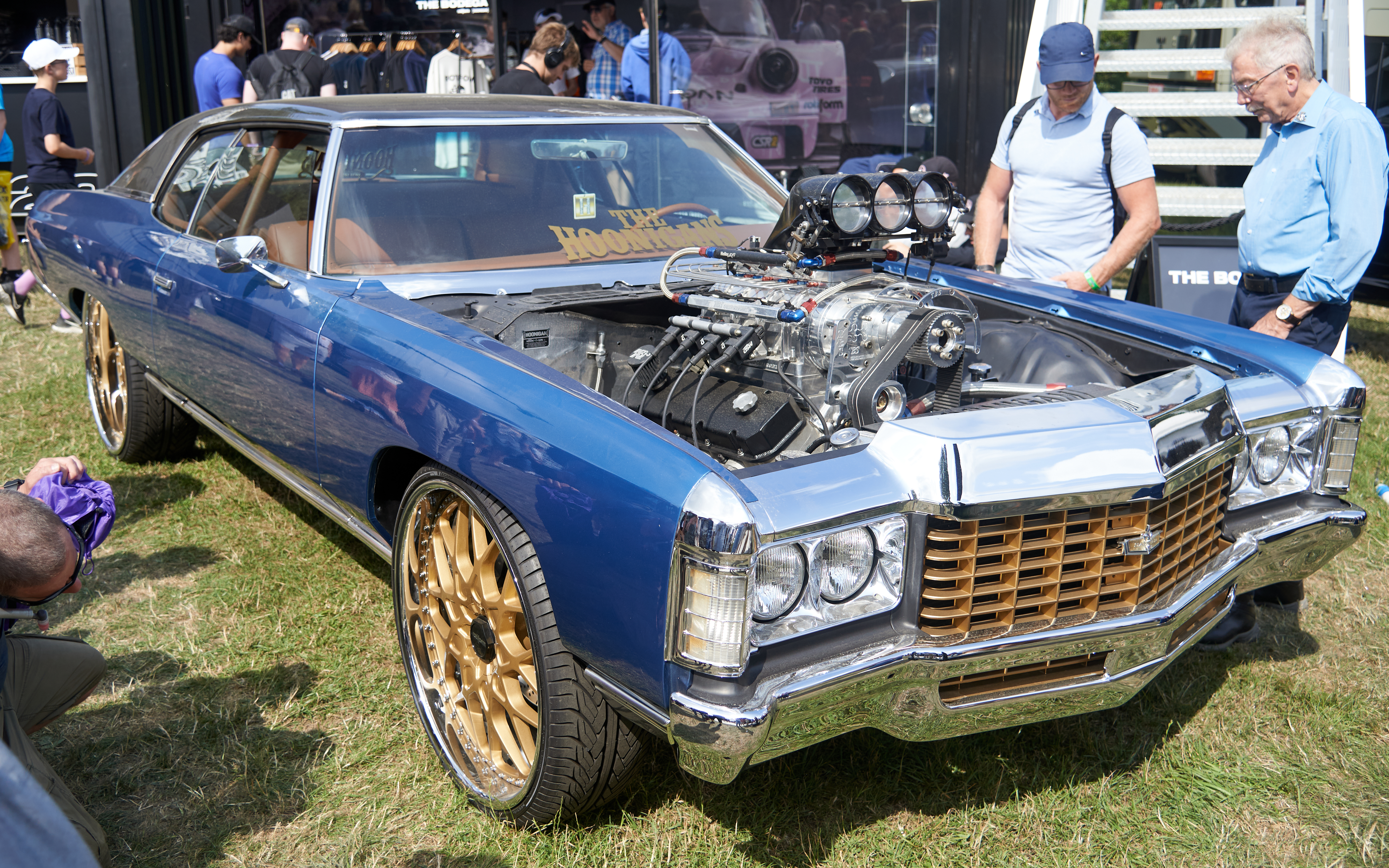
1971 Chevrolet Caprice "Donk" modified for drag racing with a supercharged V8 engine

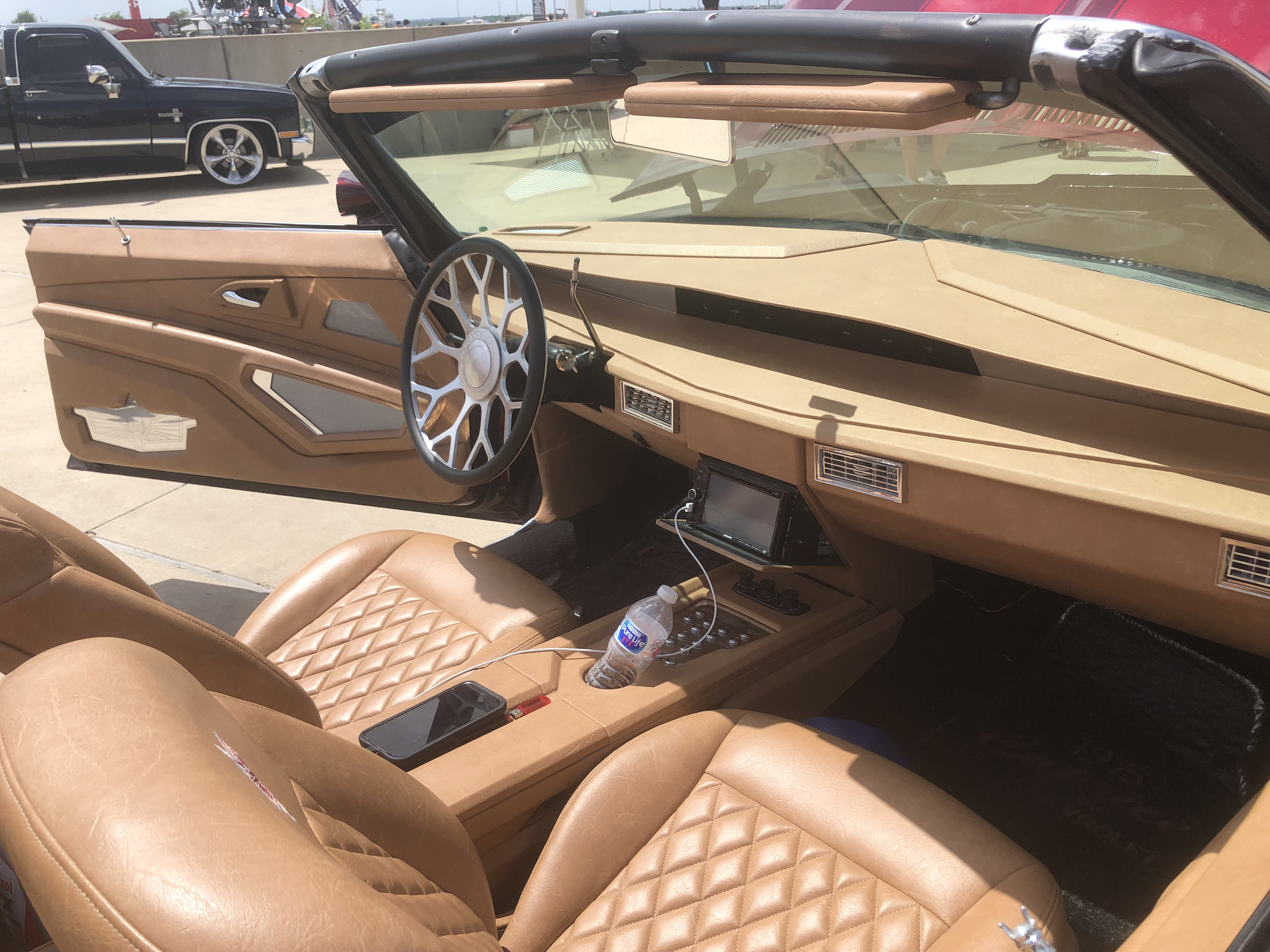
Custom interior in a 1971-1976 Caprice "Donk"

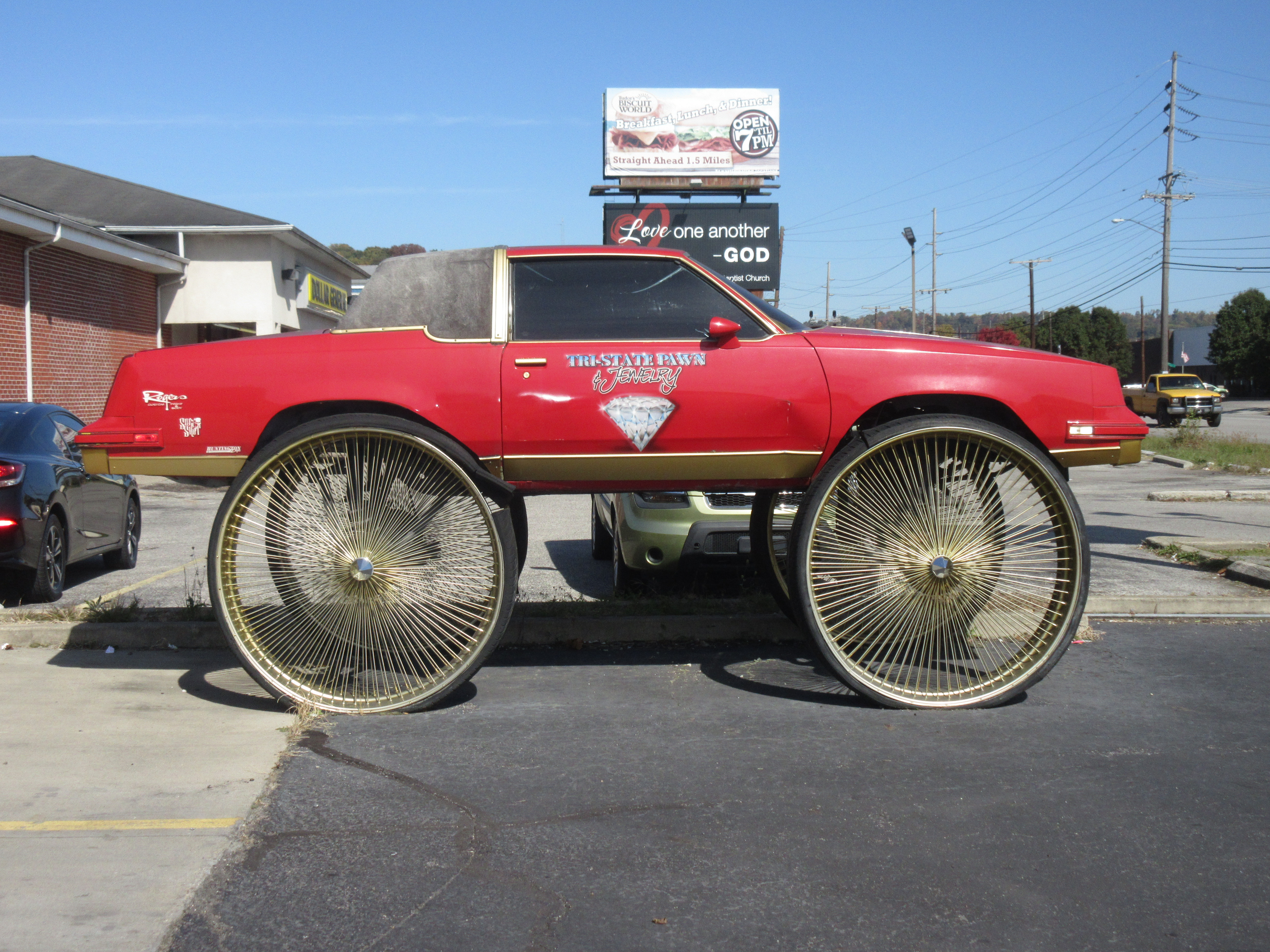
Oldsmobile Cutlass on 50-inch wire wheels, thought to be the largest size wheel ever fitted to a hi-riser

== See also ==
- Scraper (car)
- Dub (wheel)
- Lowrider
- Southern rap
