= Vent (EP) =

Vent EP

EP by Sounds of Swami
- Released: 2008
- Recorded: 2008
- Genre: Punk, rock, progressive, hardcore punk
- Length: 17.31
- Label: Drawing Board Records
- Producer: Tim Gray

Sounds of Swami chronology
| Vent EP (2008) | Halcyon Days EP (2009) |

The Vent EP was the first official release by English punk–rock band Sounds of Swami. After several years of recording demos, the band finally entered the studio with Tim Gray (a.k.a. TimG) in Manchester. Recorded in two sessions, "Identity Crisis" and "BANK!" were recorded in a single day in late 2007 after a period of unsuccessful recording at another studio. The unsuccessful recordings were intended to be the band's debut mini-album titled Real to Reel due to the studio's all-analogue setup. After recording the two tracks, the mini album was scrapped and three more tracks were recorded with TimG in early 2008 over two days. Two surviving recordings from the scrapped mini album were added as bonus demos on the end of the EP. The band decided not to pursue a recording contract and instead released the EP on their own record label Drawing Board Records. The EP gained a lot of positive reviews from the UK's underground punk – rock scene with Beep! Magazine awarding it 5/5, Punktastic.com awarding it 3/5 and various other reputable zines remarking on its alternative and experimental sound. "Identity Crisis" was released on an international punk compilation.

== Track listing ==
1. "The Lions Share"
2. "Political Politeness"
3. "Identity Crisis"
4. "Glassroots"
5. "Bank!"

The first 1000 copies included two bonus demo recordings. 'S.I.T.A.R.S' and 'Tension Seekers' were added as tracks 6 and 7.

== Personnel ==
- Kurt Wood – Vocals, Guitar, Percussion
- Luke Yates – Vocals, Guitar, Percussion
- Rob Gilbert – Vocals, Bass
- Matthew Wade – Drums
- Tim Gray – Producer
- Jon Simmons – Art Work
