= Revenge of the Psychotronic Man =

English punk band

- Also known as: Revenge of... Revenge; RPM
- Origin: Manchester, England, UK
- Genres: Punk rock, hardcore punk, crossover thrash
- Years active: 2004–2018
- Label: TNSrecords
- Members: Andy Psychotronic; Matt Woods; Big Hands
- Past members: Liam Revenge; Davey Psychotronic
- Website: revengeofthepsychotronicman.com

Revenge of the Psychotronic Man are an English punk band with hardcore influences based in Manchester and formed in 2004. They are sometimes referred to as Revenge Of..., Revenge, or RPM. The band has had music released in the UK, mainland Europe, and the US, and has toured the UK and Europe extensively. At the start of 2018, the band announced they would be splitting up in December of that year, but would be playing dates for the remainder of the year. Their final gig was at Rebellion in their hometown of Manchester, which sold out four months in advance.

== Career ==
Revenge of the Psychotronic Man has released two split EPs, two 7" EPs, and three albums via TNSrecords.

The 2009 album Make Pigs Smoke received critical acclaim from many music publications worldwide, such as Razorcake, Riot 77 and many other punk fanzines plus Big Cheese magazine and Rebel Noise both rated the release 5/5.

The 2011 International Split EP was released on TNSrecords, Stikman Records and 5FeetUnder Records and also featured the following bands: Mighty Midgets (Denmark), Fist of the North Star (US) and Broken Aris (Sweden). This again received critical acclaim from established and more underground press, with Big Cheese Magazine again rating the release 5/5 and being featured in Rockfreaks' (Denmark) best new music of 2011.

The 2012 album Shattered Dreams Parkway again received critical acclaim from the likes of Louder Than War, Big Cheese, Leeds music Scene, Lights Go Out Fanzine, among others. The album has been collectively released by TNSrecords, Boss Tuneage records, Pumpkin Records, 5FeetUnder Records, DeadLamb Records, and Entes Anomicos.

The band has supported established acts such as Bad Religion, Discharge, NoMeansNo, Smoke or Fire, Slaves (UK Band) and The Briefs. they have played gigs in the UK, Germany, The Netherlands, Denmark, Belgium, France, Poland and The Czech Republic and, as of May 2016, have played nearly 500 shows.

The band has also received airplay on many radio stations worldwide such as The Punk Rock Demonstration and The BBC Radio 1 Punk Show whom they recorded a live Maida Vale Studios session for in June 2013.

In June 2013, they recorded a Maida Vale Session for the Radio1 Punk Show. This has been released on 7" vinyl.

In 2014, to mark the band's ten-year anniversary, a new 7" was released, including two new recordings of old tracks plus collaborations with Tim G (MTV Mash Ups) and From the Cradle to the Rave to produce dance remixes.

A split 12" was released in 2015. This record shared space with folk band Bootscraper. The bands played cover versions of each other's songs.

The 2016 album Colossal Velocity has again received critical acclaim including a 4K review from Kerrang! and praise from Vive Le Rock Magazine and Louder Than War.

== History ==
Revenge of the Psychotronic Man were formed in 2004, and their name is a reference to the film of the same name. The makers of the film have since endorsed the band and produced a film trailer/music video using one of the band's songs.

The original line-up included Andy Davies (bass/vocals), Davey Psychotronic (guitar/vocals) and Christopher ‘Big Hands’ Hinsley on Drums. Liam McDevitt joined on guitar in 2005. He has since played for The Hyperjax and The Termites. The band produced a full-length album Shitty Zombies and an EP Party In The Van before McDevitt left and was replaced by Gizmo guitarist Matt Woods in 2007. Andy Davies started TNSrecords with Tim Bevington in 2008, and the band recorded an exclusive track for the label's, now sold out, debut compilation release as well as featuring live at the label's sold-out launch night.

The second TNSrecords release was a split EP between Revenge of the Psychotronic Man and ska-punk band The Fractions. This has also sold out of its first pressing. It featured four Revenge Of... tracks and 3 from The Fractions and received favourable reviews from the underground punk scene.

Davey Psychotronic left the band in 2008 to move to London, but has contributed backing/gang vocals to recent releases.

As a three-piece, the band made their first visit to mainland Europe later in 2008. The band's first release as a three-piece, Make Pigs Smoke (which is a reference to Alan Partridge) was a 14 track album was released in May 2009 through TNSrecords to critical acclaim from established magazines as well as a huge number of independent fanzines and webzines, highlighting the band's underground credentials. This album has sold out of its first pressing and is available as a free download from the bandcamp page, highlighting the band's aims to make music accessible to all.

After the success of this release, the band played successful UK tours and high-profile support slots with the likes of Bad Religion. In 2011, Revenge Of... released their second split EP, this time sharing CD space with Mighty Midgets (Denmark), Fist of the North Star (US) and Broken Aris (Sweden). It was released on TNSrecords in the UK, 5FeetUnder Records in Denmark and Stikman Records in the US. This release has again received great acclaim and allowed the band to tour mainland Europe extensively.

The follow-up album Shattered Dreams Parkway was released on 12" vinyl and CD in October 2012 through TNSrecords and a collective of labels including Boss Tuneage, Pumpkin, Entez Anomicos (Germany), 5FeetUnder (Denmark), and Dead Lamb (Ireland). This has again received acclaim from the underground press and some more established publications such as Big Cheese magazine and Louder Than War.

In June 2013, the band recorded a live session at Maida Vale Studios for Mike Davies and the BBC Radio 1 punk show. They were also endorsed and played by Steve Lamacq on BBC 6 Music In September 2013, Steve Lamacq picked a track as one of his five choices for a limited edition vinyl, which was given out at the AIM Awards ceremony.

The band released their Colossal Velocity album in summer 2016, which again received favourable reviews including a 4K review from Kerrang!.

After announcing they would split up at the end of the year, the band released their final album, That Was Just a Noise in 2018. The release featured rarities, unreleased material as well as classic album tracks.

== Other projects ==
Bassist and vocalist Andy Davies co-runs TNSrecords and writes TNSfanzine. The label has released 50+ punk/ska CDs/vinyls to date (July 2016). The band discusses DIY politics both in their music and in interviews. Both the band and the label has become notable for its rejection of mainstream music culture and work to promote like-minded musicians working together collectively. The label and the band have been referenced in many dissertations and essays related to DIY culture. DIY culture has been written about extensively by Andy in TNSfanzine. TNS fanzine is a punk rock fanzine which started in 2003 and has featured in exhibitions and is a prominent part of Salford Zine Library. Andy is also part of the collective that puts on Manchester Punk Festival.

All members have been involved in promoting underground punk gigs and bands. As part of TNSrecords Andy Davies runs a stage at Strummercamp Festival in Cheadle Hulme Matt Woods puts on MBBP gigs in Manchester.

Guitarist Matt Woods formerly played drums in English Dogs and External Menace, as well as playing with The Dangerous Aces and Barnyard Masturbator amongst others. Andy Davies and Big Hands formerly featured in Midlands punk band McGraw who gained some notoriety in the early 2000s and were twice featured in Kerrang magazine.

== Discography ==
- Shitty Zombies (self-released) – (2005)
- Party in the Van (self-released) – (2007)
- Revenge of the Psychotronic Man vs. The Fractions (TNSrecords) – (2008)
- Make Pigs Smoke (TNSrecords) – (2009)
- International Split (EP) with the Mighty Midgets, Fist of the North Star and Broken Aris – (TNSrecords, 5FeetUnder and Stikman) (2011)
- Shattered Dreams Parkway (album/LP/tape) (TNSrecords, Boss Tuneage, Pumpkin Records 5FeetUnder, Deadlamb Records Entes Anomicos), No Time – (October 2012)
- In Session from Maida Vale (7") (TNSrecords, Boss Tuneage, 5FeetUnder, Entes Anomicos) – (December 2013)
- Ten Years of Revenge... (7") (TNSrecords) – (April 2014)
- The Bear and the Tiger (covers split with folk band Bootscraper) (12"/CD) (TNSrecords) – (February 2015)
- Colossal Velocity (album) (12"/CD/tape) (TNSrecords, 5FeetUnder, No Time (US)) – (May 2016)
- Some of These People Have Come from Stoke (collaboration with Tim Loud) (EP) (tape) (TNSrecords, No Time) (2017)
- That Was Just a Noise (album) (12"/CD/tape) (TNSrecords, 5FeetUnder, No Time) (2018)

== Compilations ==
- Punk in Sunderland and Around the World (vol. 4) (self-released) – (2006), track: "Alcohol Is Not a Drug (It's a Drink)"
- Punktastic Unscene 4: 30 Seconds to Impact (Punktastic) – (2008), track: "Vuz Lightyear"
- TNS vol. 1: Music y People Who Drink Cider in the Gutter (TNSrecords) – (2008), track: "Get P*ssed, Talk Sh*t, Dance Like an Idiot"
- TNS vol. 2: Mainstream Music Is Sh*t (TNSrecords) – (2010), track: "Blackpool Rock"
- Punk Rock Generation vol. 3 (5FeetUnder) – (2010), track: "Needles to Say"
- TNS vol. 3: These Troublesome Thinkers (TNSrecords) – (2011), track: "Booze Time"
- Without Kibou, There Is Nothing (Kibou) – (2013), track: "Red Top Bullsh*t"
