= Los Salvadores =

English folk music group

- Origin: England
- Genres: Folk, alternative
- Years active: 2004–2012
- Past members: Gareth Arnold; Marf; Hannah Ellerby; Vicky Price
- Website: Official website

Los Salvadores was a four-piece folk group from south east England. They performed across the United Kingdom and appeared at various festivals including Lounge On The Farm, Boomtown, Zoo Thousand, Endorse It in Dorset, Sellindge Music Festival and the Rochester Sweeps Festival.

== Biography ==
The band originally formed as a loose folk punk collective in 2004, and went through many line-up changes before arriving at its acoustic, folk-influenced sound with the addition of Hannah Ellerby on violin and French horn player Vicky Price.

Despite moderate success on the UK punk scene between 2004 and 2008 including high-profile support slots with Neck, Pronghorn, The Dangerfields and The Ghost of a Thousand, Los Salvadores continued to explore the folk elements in their music, eventually deciding to go fully acoustic in early 2009.

The first EP showcasing the new style was recorded at Barnroom Studios with Bernie Torme. Titled Wasps Birds and Clients, it featured four reworked songs and two new songs. Los Salvadores based many songs on Kent legends and history, such as the Smugglers Leap, and Bartholemew's Day, the story of the Battle of Sandwich (1217).

The band performed at a variety of folk clubs and festivals across the UK, and shared stages with a variety of artists such as Emily Barker and the Red Clay Halo, Jez Lowe, The Bad Shepherds, Eliza Carthy and Tunng.

== Discography ==
=== Albums ===
- Attack of the Clones (2008)

=== EPs ===
- Los Salvadores (2005)
- Is This a Set Up? (2005)
- Pink Champagne (2006)
- Excerpt from a Ward (2008)
- Wasps, Birds and Clients (2009)
- Stuck Between the Devil and the Deep Blue Sea (2010)
- Mistress of Distress and the Incredible Shrinking Man (2011)

== Members ==
- Gareth Arnold: Vocals (2004–2012)
- Marf: Guitar, vocals (2004–2012)
- Hannah Ellerby: Violin (2009–2012)
- Vicky Price: French horn, vocals (2009–2012)
- Jim McLean-Johnsen: Bass (2008–2011)
- Darren Thomas: Drums (2009–2011)
- Matt Selfe: Mandolin (2004–2009)
- Matt Ogilvie: Drums (2009)
- Pete Blackett: Keyboard (2004–2009)
- Huw Arnold: Drums (2004–2009)
- Nat Calico: Accordion (2006)
- Luke Renton: Bass (2004–2008)
- Patrick Redford: Saxophone, vocals (2004–2005)

== See also ==
- 3 Daft Monkeys
- Seth Lakeman
