= TNSrecords =

DIY record label

- Founded: 2008
- Founder: Andy Psychotronic, Tim Bevington
- Genre: Punk rock/ska
- Country of origin: U.K.
- Location: Manchester, England, United Kingdom
- Official website: TNSrecords

TNSrecords (also known as TNS and That's Not Skanking) is a punk record label based in Manchester, UK. TNSrecords aims to support and spread the word about exciting bands, who could be considered punk in either sound or ethos. The emphasis is very much based around community spirit, the DIY ethos and working collectively with like-minded people. The TNS family continues to expand. They started out as a punk zine and then a gig night way back in 2003 in Manchester. TNS evolved into an independent label in 2008.

== Roster ==
The following all have releases on TNSrecords:

- A WarAgainstSound
- ACiD DROP
- Autonomads
- Beat The Red Light
- Bethan Mary Leadley
- Black Star Dub Collective
- Bootscraper
- BrainDead
- Broken Aris (Sweden)
- Faintest Idea
- The Fractions
- The Franceens
- Fist Of The North Star (USA)
- Hated Til Proven
- Harijan
- John Player Specials
- The Kirkz
- Knife Club (UK)
- Kollapse (Denmark)
- Leagues Apart
- No Fealty (Denmark)
- Nosebleed (band)
- Officer Down
- PIZZATRAMP (South Wales)
- Revenge of the Psychotronic Man
- Rising Strike
- Sense of Urgency
- The Shadowcops
- Sounds of Swami
- Stand Out Riot
- Stoj Snak (Denmark)

== Releases ==
As of 5 May 2023, TNS Records have the following releases;

- TNS001: TNSrecords Volume 1: Music By People Who Drink Cider In The Gutter (CD) (March 29, 2008)
- TNS002: Revenge of the Psychotronic Man vs. The Fractions (CD) (June 1, 2008)
- TNS003: Harijan/John Player Specials split (CD) (2008)
- TNS004: The Shadowcops - A Big Pot Of Hot (CD) (2009)
- TNS005: Revenge of the Psychotronic Man - Make Pigs Smoke (CD) (May 1, 2009)
- TNS006: Sounds Of Swami - Halcyon Days (7”) (2009)
- TNS007: TNSrecords Volume 2: Mainstream Music Is Shit (Double CD) (2009)
- TNS008: Stand Out Riot, A War Against Sound, and Sense Of Urgency Split (CD) (2009)
- TNS009: Beat The Red Light EP (CD) (2009)
- TNS010: The Kirkz - Agroculture (CD) (2010)
- TNS011: Leagues Apart - To Anywhere (CD) (2010)
- TNS012: Faintest Idea - Ignorance Is This (CD) (2010)
- TNS013: Bootscraper - Country And Eastern (CD) (2010)
- TNS014: Beat The Red Light - Salt The Lands (CD) (2011)
- TNS015: Stand Out Riot - The Gentlemen Bandits (CD) (2011)
- TNS016: Mighty Midgets/Revenge Of The Psychotronic Man/Fist Of The North Star/Broken Arms - The International Split EP (CD) (2011)
- TNS017: Rising Strike - Bite The Hand That Feeds (2011)
- TNS018: Autonomads/Black Star Dub Collective - From Rusholme With Dub (12”/CD) (2011)
- TNS019: Hated Til Proven - Songs For The Short Of Attention (CD) (June 1, 2012)
- TNS020: TNSrecords Volume 3: These Troublesome Thinkers (CD) (April 1, 2012)
- TNS021: BrainDead - Dub Evolution (7”) (May 17, 2012)
- TNS022: Bootscraper - S/T (CD) (July 2, 2012)
- TNS023: Faintest Idea - The Voice Of Treason (CD) (August 7, 2012)
- TNS024: Revenge of the Psychotronic Man - Shattered Dreams Parkway (12”/CD) (October 22, 2012)
- TNS025: Stöj Snak - Songs About Beliefs (7”) (June 19, 2012)
- TNS026: Kollapse - S/T (10”) (November 1, 2012)
- TNS027: Sounds Of Swami - S/T (CD) (April 1, 2013)
- TNS028: Acid Drop - The End Of Days (CD) (July 8, 2013)
- TNS029: BrainDead - Libertalia (12”/CD) (July 11, 2013)
- TNS030: No Fealty - In the Shadow of the Monolith (12”) (August 9, 2013)
- TNS031: Revenge of the Psychotronic Man - In Session From Maida Vale (7”) (December 9, 2013)
- TNS032: The Franceens - Stepford Smiles (CD) (December 9, 2013)
- TNS033: Wonk Unit - Nervous Racehorse (CD) (March 2, 2014)
- TNS034: Revenge of the Psychotronic Man - 10 Years Of Revenge (7”) (February 14, 2014)
- TNS035: Black Star Dub Collective - Vampire (12”) (May 5, 2011)
- TNS036: Officer Down - Dead Lands (12”/CD) (June 9, 2014)
- TNS037: The Franceens - S/T (7”) (November 28, 2014)
- TNS038: Black Volvo - Once We All Were Wolves (12”/CD) (November 1, 2014)
- TNS039: Roughneck Riot - Out Of Anger (12”/CD) (October 13, 2014)
- TNS040: The Domestics - Routine And Ritual (12”/CD) (December 15, 2014)
- TNS041: Revenge of the Psychotronic Man/Bootscraper - The Bear And The Tiger (12”/CD) (February 14, 2015)
- TNS042: Vanilla Pod - Seeing Out The Sunrise (12”/CD) (April 4, 2015)
- TNS043: Chewed Up/Casual Nausea - split album (12”) (September 2, 2015)
- TNS044: The Kirkz - Unregrettable (June 25, 2015)
- TNS045: Wonk Unit - Flying The Japanese Flag (12”) (November 13, 2015)
- TNS046: Mighty Midgets - Raising Ruins For The Future (12”) (December 18, 2015)
- TNS047: Stöj Snak - ScreamerSongwriter (12”) (June 9, 2016)
- TNS048: Wonk Unit - Feel The Wonkness (CD) (May 5, 2014)
- TNS049: Faintest Idea - Increasing The Minimum Rage (12”/CD) (April 1, 2016)
- TNS050: Matilda’s Scoundrel’s - Crowley’s Curse (7”) (October 3, 2016)
- TNS051: Wonk Unit - Trolley’s Thank You/Wonk Unit Saved My Life (12”) (July 1, 2016)
- TNS052: Revenge of the Psychotronic Man - Colossal Velocity (12”/CD) (July 15, 2016)
- TNS053: Shot! - Masquerade Of Wolves (7”) (August 17, 2016)
- TNS054: BrainDead vs. Conscious Youth (12”) (September 30, 2016)
- TNS055: Wonk Unit - Mr Splashy (12”/CD) (September 23, 2016)
- TNS056: Pizzatramp - Blowing Chunks (12”/CD) (November 11, 2016)
- TNS057: Kollapse - Angst (12”) (May 19, 2017)
- TNS058: Black Volvo - Bad Driving (12”/CD) (March 17, 2017)
- TNS059: TNS Tour: Wonk Unit/Roughneck Riot/Faintest Idea/Revenge of the Psychotronic Man (7”) (February 24, 2017)
- TNS060: Throwing Stuff - Fit, Fine And Well (12”/CD) (April 7, 2017)
- TNS061: Grand Collapse - Along The Dew (12”/CD) (May 19, 2017)
- TNS062: Wonk Unit - Muffy (12”) (May 5, 2017)
- TNS063: Matilda’s Scoundrel’s - As The Tide Turns (12”/CD) (August 8, 2017)
- TNS064: The Domestics - Pissing On Perfection (7”) (May 5, 2017)
- TNS065: The Domestics - Cherry Blossom Life (12”) (August 4, 2017)
- TNS066: Faintest Idea - The Voice Of Treason (12”) (October 7, 2017)
- TNS067: Wonk Unit - Nervous Racehorse (12”) (November 24, 2017)
- TNS068: Stand Out Riot - The Gentlemen Bandits (12”) (December 15, 2017)
- TNS069: Tim Loud and the Psychotronic Men - Some Of These People Have Come From Stoke (Tape) (November 17, 2017)
- TNS070: Pizzatramp - Revenge Of The Bangertronic Dan, Plus 13 Songs (12”) (January 19, 2018)
- TNS071: Random Hand - Change Of Plan (12”) (February 9, 2018)
- TNS072: Bobby Funk - Avocado Stains (12”) (April 16, 2018)
- TNS073: Nosebleed - Scratching Circles On The Dancefloor (12”/CD) (April 6, 2018)
- TNS074: Revenge of the Psychotronic Man - That Was Just A Noise (12”) (May 1, 2018)
- TNS075: Uniforms - Reasons To Breathe (7”) (August 24, 2018)
- TNS076: Tim Loud - Salvation (12”/CD) (September 28, 2018)
- TNS077: Vanilla Pod - Goodbye My Love… (7”) (October 5, 2018)
- TNS078: Incisions - S/T (12”/CD) (December 7, 2018)
- TNS079: The Domestics/Pizzatramp - Discipline (5”) (November 2, 2018)
- TNS080: Pizzatramp - Grand Relapse (12”/CD) (April 5, 2019)
- TNS081: Hardkore Dokument 1 - featuring The Domestics/Pizzatramp/Grand Collapse/Wolfbeast Destroyer/Rash Decision/Guilt Police (7”) (June 19, 2019)
- TNS082: Stöj Snak/Speed Dinosaurs - The Mass Extinction split (7”) (April 19, 2019)
- TNS083: TNSrecords: The Family (CD) (January 2, 2019)
- TNS084: Casual Nausea - Demons (12”) (April 19, 2019)
- TNS085: The Pulsebeat compilation (12”) (July 5, 2019)
- TNS086: Pi$$er - Wretched Life (7”) (July 12, 2019)
- TNS087: Haest - Anomie (12”/CD) (January 10, 2020)
- TNS088: Jodie Faster - Blame Yourself (12”) (February 13, 2020)
- TNS089: Incisions/Pizzatramp - Do You Know Who You Look Like (7”) (March 27, 2020)
- TNS090: Christmas - Hot Nights In Saint Vandal (12”/CD) (February 28, 2020)
- TNS091: Follow Your Dreams - The Half Life Of Teaspoons (12”/CD) (March 13, 2020)
- TNS092: Brassick - 2.0 (12”/CD) (April 27, 2020)
- TNS093: Knife Club - We Are Knife Club (12”/CD) (May 1, 2020)
- TNS094: Stöj Snak - Life, Death And Everything In Between (12”) (October 23, 2020)
- TNS095: Bobby Funk - Longing For The Bonging (12”/CD) (June 6, 2020)
- TNS096: The Domestics/Pizzatramp - No Life/This Is Your Life (12”) (June 12, 2020)
- TNS097: Pi$$er - Crushed Down To Paste (12”) (July 10, 2020)
- TNS098: Harijan - S/T (Double 12”/CD) (December 18, 2020)
- TNS099: Knife Club - Lockdown Acoustic EP (7”) (November 6, 2020)
- TNS100: TNS Volume 4: Cheap Cans, Broken Vans and Basement Bar Bands (Double 12”/CD) (February 19, 2021)
- TNS101: Matilda’s Scoundrel’s - The Devil’s Dues (7”) (February 26, 2021)
- TNS102: Pi$$er - Carved Up for Yuks (12”) (February 26, 2021)
- TNS103: Incisions - BLISS (12”/CD) (April 2, 2021)
- TNS104: Grand Collapse - Empty Plinths (12”/CD) (August 6, 2021)
- TNS105: Jodie Faster - (In)complete Discography (12”) (July 9, 2021)
- TNS106: Nosebleed - Dance With The Devil (12”/CD) (November 11, 2022)
- TNS107: Beng Beng Cocktail - S/T (12”/CD) (March 1, 2022)
- TNS108: Nexø - False Flag (12”) (April 15, 2022)
- TNS109: Ättestor/Zero Again - The Ä To Z Of Ignorance, Indifference and Idiocy (7”) (September 16, 2022)
- TNS110: The Sewer Cats - Cute Aggression (12”/CD) (April 15, 2022)
- TNS111: Knife Club - Club Classics (12”/CD) (June 24, 2022)
- TNS112: James Domestic - Carrion Repeating (12") (March 9, 2022)
- TNS113: Haest/Christmas/Batwölf/Electric Frankenstein - The International Split LP (12”) (September 9, 2022)
- TNS114: Faintest Idea - The Road To Sedition (12”/CD) (March 31, 2023)
- TNS115: Haest - Belabour (12”/CD) (January 13, 2023)
- TNS116: Vægtløs - Kakofoni (7”) (October 6, 2022)
- TNS117: Bruise Control - Useless For Something (12”/CD/Tape) (April 28, 2023)
- TNS118: Knife Club - Our Club, Our Rules (12”/CD) (April 7, 2023)
- TNS119: The Domestics - East Anglian Hardcore (12”/CD) (June 20, 2023)

== TNSrecords Fanzine ==
TNSrecords also occasionally produce a fanzine. It began in 2003 as a free publication, and was available at various music stores, and also on-line. The Fanzine features reviews of recent musical releases from the Punk rock, Ska, Hardcore, Psychobilly, and occasionally other genres, as well as articles, often of a comedy nature or left-wing political viewpoint, and news about forthcoming gigs. That's Not Skanking fanzine originally started in 2003, in Manchester. It covered punk rock, ska and related genres. That incarnation of the fanzine lasted 18 issues, with an average run of 250 copies. However, the launch of TNSrecords in 2008 resulted in the fanzine being relaunched as TNSrecords fanzine. As of Summer 2011 there had been 14 issues, which usually coincided with label releases and had a print run of around 1500. The fanzine also uses imagery of animals and has also featured comical features such as funny footballer names and human impressions of animals. Content wise it varies from covering the ridiculous, through to more political and social issues. Band wise, as well as documenting the local scene and bands from the label, interviews have also been conducted with more established acts such as Zeke, Million Dead and many more. The fanzine was featured in an exhibition and film at Salford Art Gallery in 2011/12, which was curated by Salford Zine Library. The film features commentary by Andy.

== TNS Gigs ==
TNSrecords arranged DIY gigs for many years. TNS gigs are currently in hiatus. These gigs usually featured bands that play Punk rock, Ska and other similar genres. They were held at Retro Bar, Gulliver's, Kraak Gallery & Base Cafe in Manchester. But sometimes took place further afield, including Blackpool, Leeds, and Macclesfield. The gigs started in 2004.

== Manchester Punk Festival ==
In 2015, TNSrecords formed a collective with Moving North and Anarchistic Undertones to start a new punk festival in Manchester. The aim of Manchester Punk Festival is to bring a diverse range of bands, who could be considered punk in sound or ethos, to Manchester.

The weekend offers the opportunity for many people to congregate and listen to awesome bands from all over the world in some of the cities best independent venue.

By 2023 the festival had grown to 140 acts performing over 7 venues across Manchester.

== TNSradio ==
In February 2009, TNSrecords launched TNSradio, a monthly podcast featuring Punk and Ska music. From February 2010 the podcast became a weekly show which is broadcast on American internet radio stations Punk Rock Demonstration. and Real Punk Radio. Due to a lack of time TNSrecords were unable to continue with the weekly show, with the episodes stopping in the summer of 2010. The show returned in June 2011, this time on a monthly basis, as part of the Punk Britannia weekly podcast which is broadcast on Punk Rock Demonstration and from the Studs and Punks website. The podcast is currently in hiatus, although did briefly return as the 'Cheap Cans, Broken Vans and Basement Bar Bands Podcast' during lockdown, where Andy and Bev, alongside guests shared memories about each of their first 100 releases.

== Other acts that have worked with TNS Records ==
Early in 2008 TNSrecords released a Compilation CD featuring UK Punk and Ska acts, under the title Music By People Who Drink Cider In The Gutter. The CD received critical acclaim in the Manchester press as well as some note in the rest of the U.K. There has also been some notice taken of the Compilation CD Internationally. Tracks were included by various bands:

- The Dangerfields
- Revenge of the Psychotronic Man
- The Kirkz
- The Shadowcops
- Buzzkill
- Great St. Louis
- Dog Toffee
- Just Panic
- Harijan
- The Fractions
- On The Turn
- Speeding Bee
- Faintest Idea
- The Hyperjax
- The Medicine Bow
- Mr International and The Getawy Gang
- Sounds of Swami
- Death By Decibels
- The Shuffle
- Matt Woods

In the summer of 2009 TNSrecords released their second Compilation CD featuring UK Punk and Ska acts, under the title Mainstream Music Is Shit. Tracks were included by various bands including: Disk 1

- The Shadowcops
- Sounds of Swami
- Revenge of the Psychotronic Man
- Rising Strike
- D'Corner Bois
- The Kirkz
- The Emos
- The Dangerfields
- The Dead Reckoning
- The Hyperjax
- Great St. Louis
- The Nova Fives
- ACiD DROP
- Just Add Monsters
- Fair Do's
- The Dangerous Aces
- The Terrors
- SmackRats
- 2 Sick Monkeys

Disk 2

- Harijan
- Cartoon Violence
- Stand Out Riot
- John Player Specials
- Jimmy The Squirrel
- The Hostiles
- The Hijacks
- Sense of Urgency
- A War Against Sound
- Kickback UK
- Faintest Idea
- The Autonomads
- Rasta4eyes
- Just Panic
- Los Salvadores
- Bootscraper
- The Medicine Bow

There have been a further two volumes of TNS compilations since.
