= Lounge On The Farm =

Former music festival near Canterbury, England

- Genre: Indie rock, Dance, Popular Music
- Dates: July
- Locations: Merton Farm, Canterbury, Kent
- Years active: 2006–2015

Lounge On The Farm was a music festival held annually at Merton Farm, Canterbury, Kent, which attracted thousands of visitors each year. It was conceived and organised primarily by four figures from the vibrant local music scene; Shaun (the vision), Vic (the brains), Matt (the promotion), and Ian (the production). Organisers presented it as ‘non-conformist’ and promoted bands and produce from Kent as well as acts with a great reputation for live performances from further afield. The event was held in the nine years from 2006 to 2015, before being ‘shelved’. As of 2024, it has yet to return.

== 2006 ==
The first Lounge On The Farm festival, took place during the weekend of 15–16 July 2006 with a DJ tent, acoustic tent, and the main stage housed in the converted cow shed). The festival was close to selling out with around 3500 attendees, around 80 acts performed.

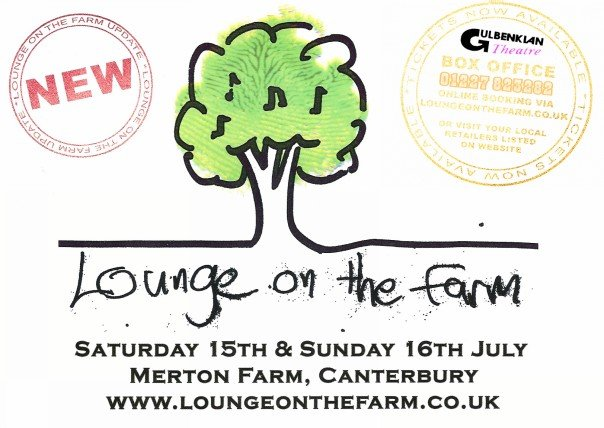
Lounge on the Farm 2006 Flyer

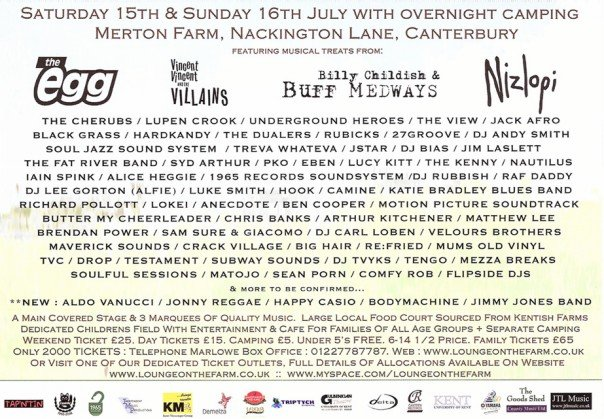
Lounge on the Farm 2006 Flyer Back

They included:-

- Vincent Vincent and the Villains
- The Egg
- Nizlopi
- The View
- Wild Billy Childish and The Buff Medways
- DJ Rubbish
- Underground Heroes
- Syd Arthur

== 2007 ==
The festival was held over three days with more acts than the first event. There was an acoustic tent, DJ tent renamed the Hoedown, the main stage became The Cow Shed, Arabesque, Sheep Dip, Further Tent and Festival Folly stage. The 2007 festival was a great success and the reputation of the event was quickly growing. Also it was the year that, after a weekend of gorgeous weather, the main stage (The Cow Shed) was hit by lighting during the set of Alabama 3. There were no ill effects and the thunder and lighting just added to the electric atmosphere of this now infamous set. It also featured a set from Ellie Goulding who was a student at the nearby University of Kent at the time, just a few months before she left to pursue her music career.

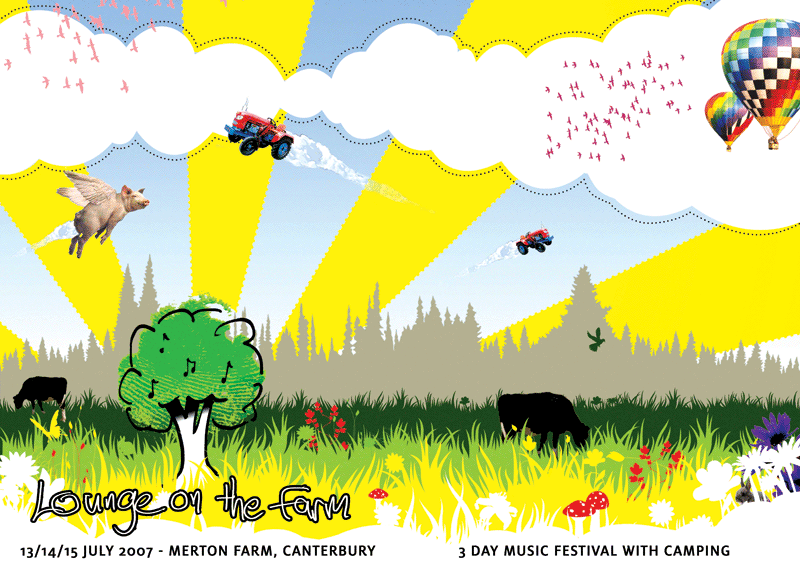
Lounge on the Farm 2007 Flyer

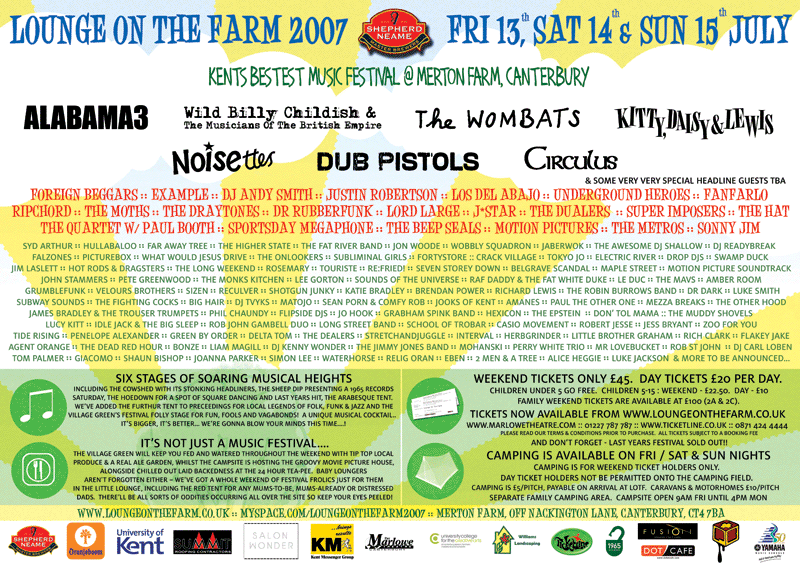
Lounge on the Farm 2007 Line Up

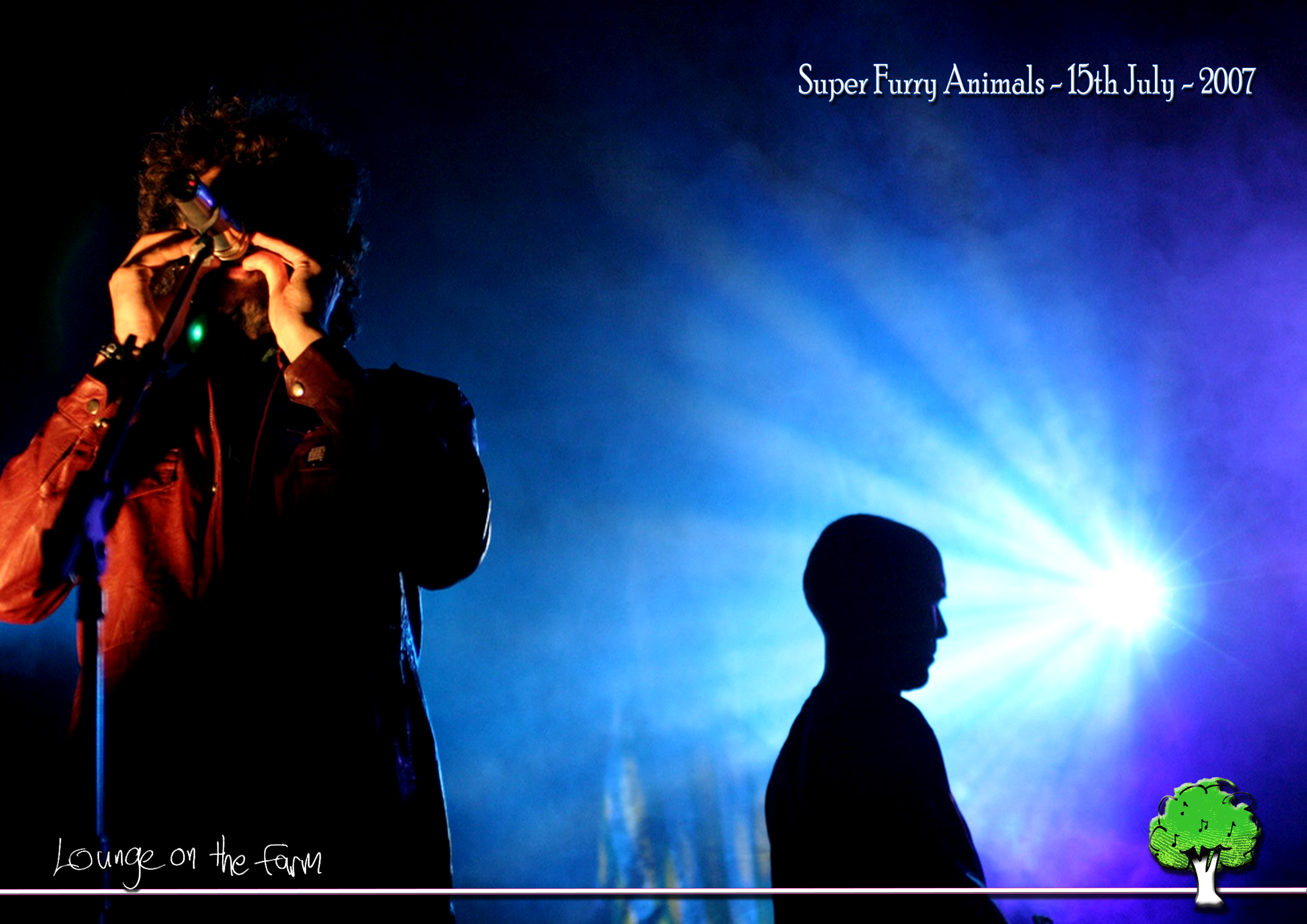
Super Fury Animals at Lounge on the Farm 2007

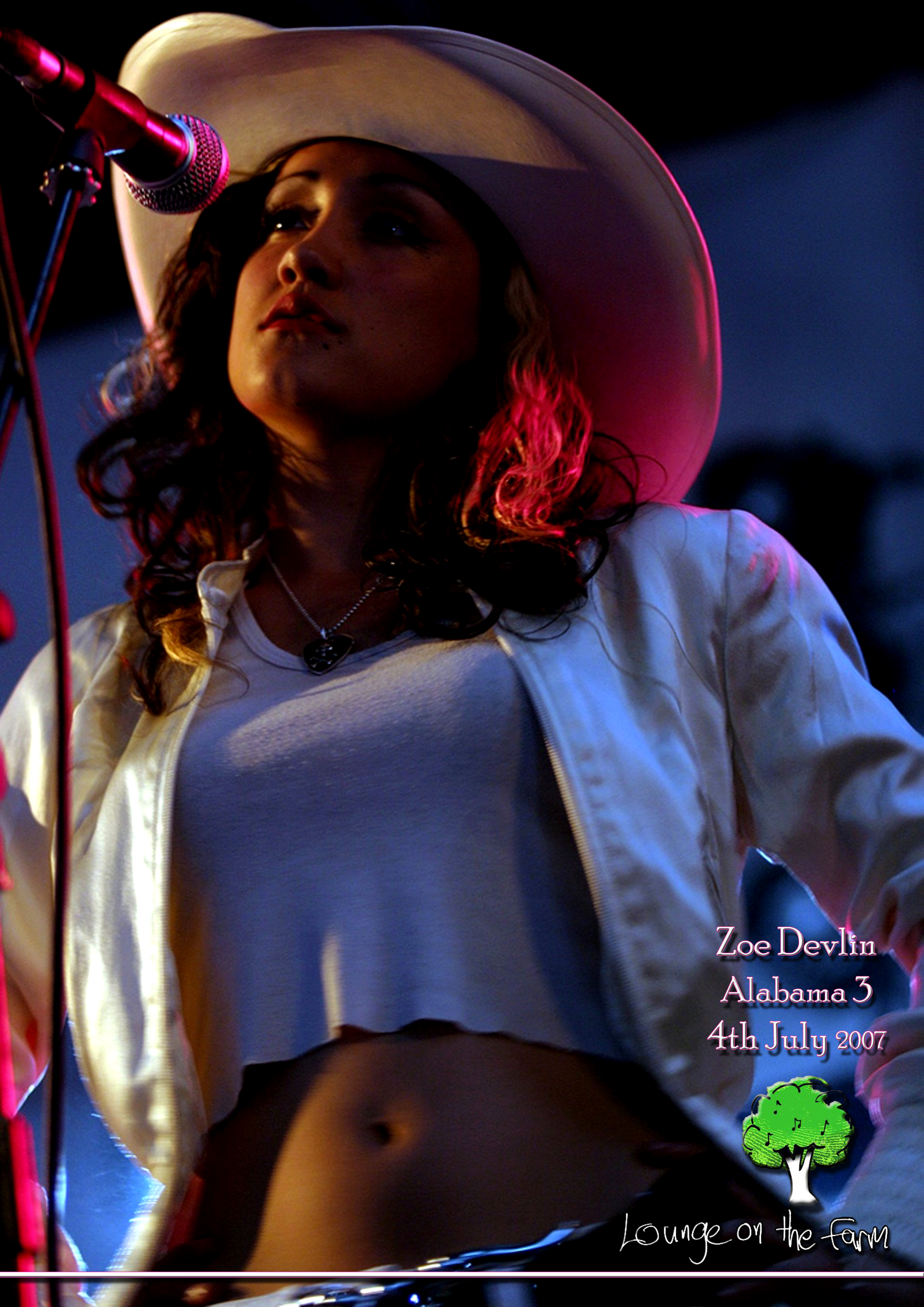
Alabama 3 at Lounge on the Farm 2007

Acts included:-

- Super Furry Animals
- Alabama 3
- Dub Pistols
- The Wombats
- The Bees
- Example
- Wild Billy Childish & The Musicians of the British Empire
- The Noisettes
- Terry Hall
- Kitty Daisy & Lewis
- Sonny J
- Ellie Goulding
- Syd Arthur

== 2008 ==
There were seven stages over three days and 150 acts performed, attracting a record 5,000 attendance.

Acts included:-

- The New York Dolls
- Mystery Jets
- Art Brut
- The Coral
- Lightspeed Champion
- Black Kids
- Holy Fuck
- Los Campesinos!
- Sonny J
- Those Dancing Days
- Natty
- Johnny Foreigner
- The Draytones
- The Shortwave Set
- Kevin Rowland
- DJ Format
- Terry Hall
- Midfield General
- No Future Sex Pistols Tribute Band
- Blondee Tribute Band

== 2009 ==
Took place over the 10–12 July weekend with an extra Rockaoke, and Meadow with open-air theatre and petting zoo.

Acts included:-

- The XX
- Roots Manuva
- The Horrors
- Edwyn Collins
- The King Blues
- Dan le sac vs Scroobius Pip
- Gong
- Golden Silvers
- Portico Quartet
- Mr. Scruff
- Casiokids
- Syd Arthur
- The Temper Trap
- S.C.U.M
- Kid Harpoon
- Toddla T
- Los Salvadores
- Krafty Kuts
- James Taylor Quartet
- DJ Food
- Wild Beasts

== 2010 ==
Over three days.

Acts included:-

- Toro Y Moi
- Courtney Pine
- Bad Manners
- The Crazy World of Arthur Brown
- Example
- Hercules and Love Affair
- Jah Wobble
- Toots & the Maytals
- Martha and the Vandellas
- Tunng
- DJ Yoda
- Beardyman
- Phill Jupitus
- Hot Club de Paris
- Kitty Daisy & Lewis
- Los Salvadores
- Syd Arthur
- Rae

== 2011 ==
There were 10,000 visitors and a new Main Stage, the Cow Shed becoming the Dance Arena.

Acts included:-

- The Streets
- Ellie Goulding
- Echo & the Bunnymen
- Example
- Katy B
- Annie Mac
- Netsky (musician)
- Danny Byrd
- London Elektricity
- Everything Everything
- Johnny Flynn
- The Vaccines
- Devlin (rapper)
- Scratch Perverts
- Benjamin Francis Leftwich
- Dananananaykroyd
- Syd Arthur
- Phil Kay
- Holly Walsh
- Slow Club
- Nu:Tone
- Graham Coxon
- Caravan (band)

== 2012 ==
Over the weekend of 7-8 July 2012 with restricted sale of youth tickets.

Acts included:-

- Emeli Sandé
- Example
- The Wombats
- The Charlatans (UK band)
- Dexys Midnight Runners
- Chic (band)
- Fake Blood
- Goldie
- Hervé (DJ)
- Toddla T
- Karima Francis
- Kitty, Daisy & Lewis
- Netsky (musician)
- Slow Club
- Spector (UK band)
- Mystery Jets
- Scratch Perverts
- Caspa
- Fink
