= Forgiato Wheels =

American wheel manufacturer

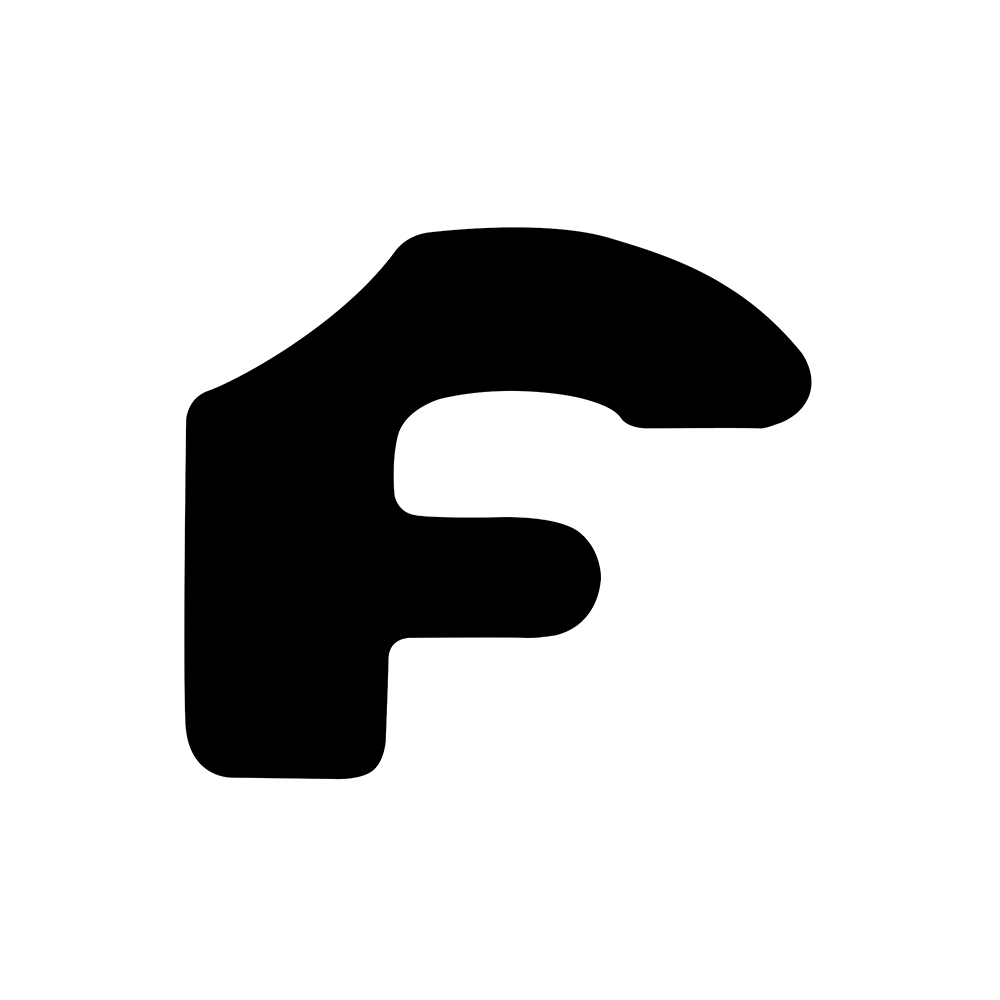
- Industry: Automotive industry, custom car parts
- Founded: 2006; 20 years ago in Los Angeles, California, United States
- Key people: Norman Celik
- Products: Wheels; Rims
- Website: forgiato.com

Forgiato, or Forgiato Designs, is an American company based in Los Angeles, California. The company was founded in 2006. It designs and builds wheels for performance cars, which are built in the United States. The company holds an annual festival, Forgiato Fest, to showcase their wheels. Celebrities such as Flo Rida and 2 Chainz have Forgiato Wheels.

== History ==
Founder Norman Celik had been in the jewelry business for over ten years before they started to sell wheels wholesale. In 1996, he began to import and customize wheels to sell to car dealers and wheel shops. They established D'Vinci Wheels in 2002. In 2005, D'Vinci launched Forgiato Designs as its own line for vehicles. The brothers sold D'Vinci in 2006 to focus on Forgiato Designs. Forgiato produces wheels for high performance vehicles like Lamborghini, Ferrari, Bentley, Rolls-Royce, Porsche, Mercedes-Benz and BMW. There are approximately 50 authorized resellers in the world.

== Forgiato Fest ==
Forgiato hosts Forgiato Fest annually to showcase exotic cars with their wheels. The festival was first held in the Miami Beach Convention Center. In September 2014, Forgiato Fest held its third annual festival with 2 Chainz as the headlining artist. In 2014, the first Forgiato Fest Car Show and Concert in Dallas was held at the Dallas Convention Center.

== In popular culture ==
Forgiato Wheels have been featured in songs such as "Who Do You Love?" by YG and Drake, "Sittin Low" by Young Jeezy, "Okay with Me" by Gucci Mane and 2 Chainz, and Ballin' by Mustard and Roddy Ricch. American Rapper YoungBoy Never Broke Again made a song named Forgiato, which is featured on his Third studio album Sincerely, Kentrell. Several celebrities have publicly shown their vehicles with Forgiato Wheels, including 2 Chainz, Slim Thug, Flo Rida, Kendall Jenner, Kylie Jenner, 50 Cent, Richie Rich, Scott Disick, Michael Jordan, YoungBoy Never Broke Again and Nicki Minaj.
