= The Dangerfields =

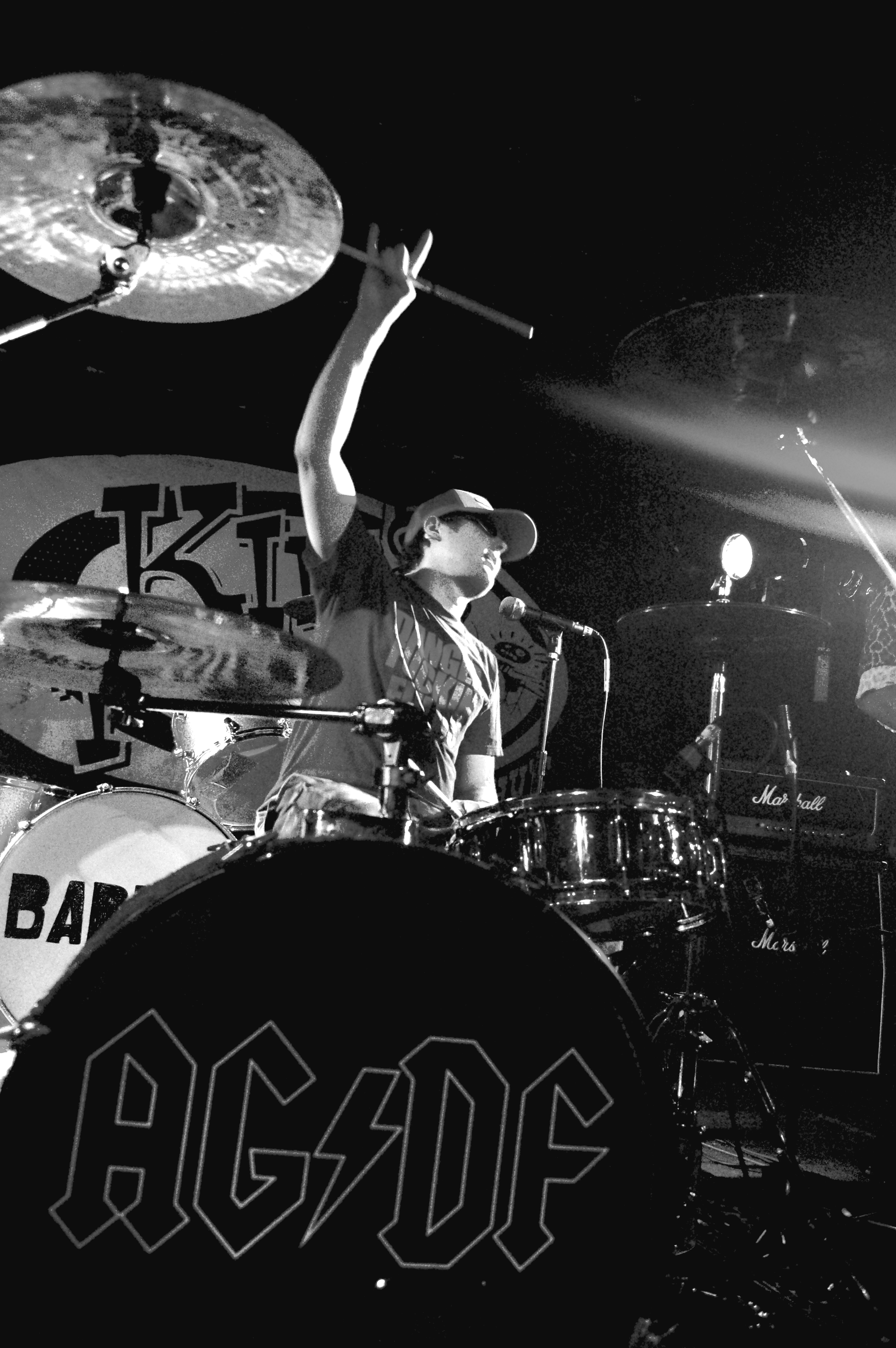
- Andrew Griswold, the only continuous member of The Dangerfields

Background information
- Origin: Northern Ireland
- Genres: Punk rock, Heavy metal
- Years active: 2000–2011, 2014, 2019-present
- Website: Official site

The Dangerfields are a punk rock/heavy metal band based in Belfast, Northern Ireland, formed in 2000. Fronted by drummer and lead vocalist Andrew Griswold, the band has gone through many line-up changes. They have released one album and four EPs, and played more than 800 live gigs, including playing their 666th gig on 06/06/06.

They have toured with many notable bands, including The Dwarves, Zeke, The Damned, Misfits, The Exploited, Flogging Molly and Stiff Little Fingers. In May 2004, Bruce Dickinson of Iron Maiden invited them to perform with him at his BBC 6 Music Road Show at Belfast's Mandela Hall alongside Therapy?.

Bands to have played their debut gigs opening for The Dangerfields include And So I Watch You from Afar and Black Spiders. Fellow Irishmen and former touring partners Gama Bomb recorded a cover version of the Dangerfields' song Maniac on their Zombi Brew EP.

The Dangerfields stopped touring in 2011, but never officially split up. They returned for 'one-off' gigs in 2014 and 2019, and as of 2026, are working on a new album.

== Members ==
- Andrew Griswold - Drums (2000-2002), Drums & Vocals (2002-2011, 2014, 2019–present)
- Baron - Bass (2000-2001, 2003, 2025–present)
- The Steve Jones - Guitar/Bass (2000-2001, 2002, 2003, 2025–present)
- Cormak - Vocals (2000-2002, 2025–present)
- 'Hot' Rob Karloff - Guitar (2008, 2010-2011, 2021–present)
- Shaun 'Gnarly' Quinn - Bass (2022-present)

== Previous members ==
- Punk J - Vocals (2000)
- Gerry Nearly - Guitar (2000)
- Simon - Vocals (2000)
- Doc Party - Vocals (2000)
- Wasp Boy - Vocals (2000), Bass (2001, 2002, 2003, 2004, 2005, 2006, 2008)
- Nicci Seven - Guitar (2000)
- Rainey - Guitar (2001)
- Jar - Guitar (2001, 2002)
- Jane Strain - Bass (2001)
- Horny Seany - Guitar/Bass (2001, 2002, 2003)
- Goatboy - Guitar/Bass (2001, 2002, 2003)
- Trues - Guitar/Bass (2001, 2002)
- Adam 'The Beast' Sims - Guitar (2002, 2003, 2004, 2006-2007, 2008, 2009-2010, 2014, 2019)
- Steve Riot - Bass (2002)
- Graeme Insect - Guitar/Bass (2002, 2003)
- Ben Dür - Bass (2002, 2005-2006)
- Roxy Michaels - Guitar (2002)
- Kevy Canavan - Guitar (2002)
- Luke Nukem - Guitar (2003)
- Catface - Bass (2003)
- Dan Bastard - Guitar/Bass (2003-2006, 2014, 2025)
- Liam Evangelist - Bass (2003)
- London Lee - Guitar/Bass (2003, 2004, 2005, 2008)
- Mully - Guitar/Bass (2003, 2004, 2005)
- Treeslug - Bass (2004)
- Saz - Bass (2004)
- Craig 'Jawbreaker' Hayworth - Bass (2004)
- Wee Gay Bryan - Bass (2004, 2019-2022), Guitar (2021)
- Diamond Dave - Bass (2004-2005)
- Sib - Bass (2006)
- Mark Numskull - Bass (2006)
- Ciarán Tracey - Bass (2006, 2008)
- Jamie 'Mad Dog' Delerict - Bass (2007-2010, 2021)
- Jasper 'Guitar' Vincent - Guitar (2007-2008)
- Johny Skullknuckles - Guitar (2008)
- Greer - Bass (2008)
- Sancho Büna - Guitar (2010)
- Jake McCullough - Guitar (2010-2011)
- Munky - Bass (2010)
- Robin Daryush - Bass (2010-2011)
- Jude McIlwaine - Guitar (2014, 2022)
- Jarlath Cowan - Bass (2014, 2022, 2025)
- Eoghan 234 - Bass (2019)

== Discography ==
=== Demo Cassette ===
- Dirty Wee Demo (2000)

=== 7" EPs ===
- Glitter Song (2002, split with Dogshit Sandwich)
- Wasted (2002, split with Miuku)
- No Respect 'Til Belfast (Ruptured Ambitions 2003)

=== CD EPs ===
- Hellride (2004)

=== Albums ===
- Born To Rock (2005)
- For Whom The Cow Pats (2022)

=== Radio Sessions ===
- BBC Radio Ulster - Across The Line (2005)

=== Compilation Appearances ===
- Gimme Gimme Rock 'n' Roll on TNSrecords Vol 2: Mainstream Music Is Shit (2009)
- Wasted Life on Time to Be Proud EP1 (2012)
