= Sounds of Swami =

Progressive rock/post-hardcore influenced punk rock band

- Origin: Keighley, England
- Genres: Post-hardcore, punk rock, progressive rock, rock, hardcore punk, alternative rock
- Years active: 2005–2023
- Labels: Drawing Board Records; TNSrecords; Bomber Music
- Members: Robert Gilbert; Kurt Wood; Luke Yates; Joe Dimuantes
- Website: Official Facebook

Sounds of Swami are an English progressive rock/post-hardcore influenced punk rock band currently active in the UK. They formed in late 2005 in Keighley, England. The band is well known for their eclectic mix of punk, DC post-hardcore, and progressive rock as well as their aggressive stage presence. To date, the band have released one album, one single, two EP's and have had their songs included on numerous international compilations. Their second album Furniture For Modern Living will be released in 2017.

== Biography ==
Sounds of Swami formed in September 2005 and had their first band practice above their local music bar. Within five weeks, the band had eight original songs and played their first gig in December. The band spent the first two years writing and demoing material using their own portable recording equipment.

The band's debut EP Vent (2008) was very well received on the underground punk circuit, with many publications commending its alternative and progressive approach to punk. Reoccurring band comparisons include Fugazi, At The Drive-In, Hot Snakes and Propagandhi. The band's second EP Halcyon Days was released in conjunction with Manchester record label TNSrecords and generated even more positive reviews. Many commented highly on the EP's raw, retro production and songcraft. Their songs have been included on several international punk compilations.

The band's songs deal with a variety of subjects, notably promotion of anti-racism, anti-commercialism, left-wing politics and D.I.Y sensibilities. Lyrics often detail first-hand experiences.

In October 2010, drummer and founding member Matthew Wade left the band to move to Brighton. He played his last show with the band at the 1in12 Club, Bradford. He was replaced by Joe Dimuantes formally of skacore outfit Random Hand.

The band travelled to Middle Farm Studios, Devon in April 2012 to record their debut album with James Bragg. The music for the album was recorded live with vocals overdubbed. The album was completed in eight days. On 18.09.12, 'Grump' from their self-titled album was played on the Radio 1 Punk Show by Mike Davies. Davies remarked "I'll be playing them again. I dig it" The first single from the album 'Stitched Up at the Sewing Circle' was released digitally on 26 November as a pay what you want download. The band embarked on a 7 date tour to support the single on 30 November 2012.

On 25.11.12, the band confirmed that TNSrecords was set to release the album on CD in early 2013. The album was released on CD on Monday 1 April through TNSrecords and digitally via the band themselves.

In 2016 the band released a video for a new single titled 'Twisting My Arm' which contains a rerecording of 'Look at Me' from their Halcyon Days 7-inch EP as the b-side. The band began posting video clips of new songs onto their [Facebook] account and confirmed they are writing a new album to be recorded in September of that year. Working with producer Andy Hawkins at The Nave Studios, the band recorded the music live straight to 2" analogue tape. 10 songs were completed in 8 days. The band's second album Furniture For Modern Living will be released on 8 July 2017.

== Members ==
- Rob Gilbert – Vocals, Bass
- Luke Yates – Vocals, Guitar
- Kurt Wood – Vocals, Guitar
- Joe Dimuantes – Drums

== Former members ==
- Matthew Wade – Drums (2005–2010)

== Discography ==
=== Albums ===
- Furniture For Modern Living (2017)
- Sounds of Swami (2013), TNSrecords

=== EPs ===
- Halcyon Days (2009), TNSrecords, Drawing Board Records
- Vent (2008), Drawing Board Records

=== Singles ===
- Kill Me Already (2017), Digital Download
- Rome Won't Wait (2017), Digital Download
- Twisting My Arm (2016), Digital Download
- Get Your Head Checked (2013), Digital Download
- Stitched Up at the Sewing Circle (2012), Digital Download

=== Demos ===
- Demo Two (2007), CDR
- Demo One (2006), CDR

== Drawing Board Records ==
In 2008, the band launched their own record label Drawing Board Records to release their debut Vent EP (dbr001). They chose not to pursue a recording contract elsewhere in order to keep complete control over their early releases until they solidified their overall sound. Their second EP Halcyon Days was also released on the label (dbr002) in conjunction with Manchester record label TNSrecords. They later signed with TNSrecords to release their debut self-titled album.
