= Scraper bike =

Type of modified bicycle

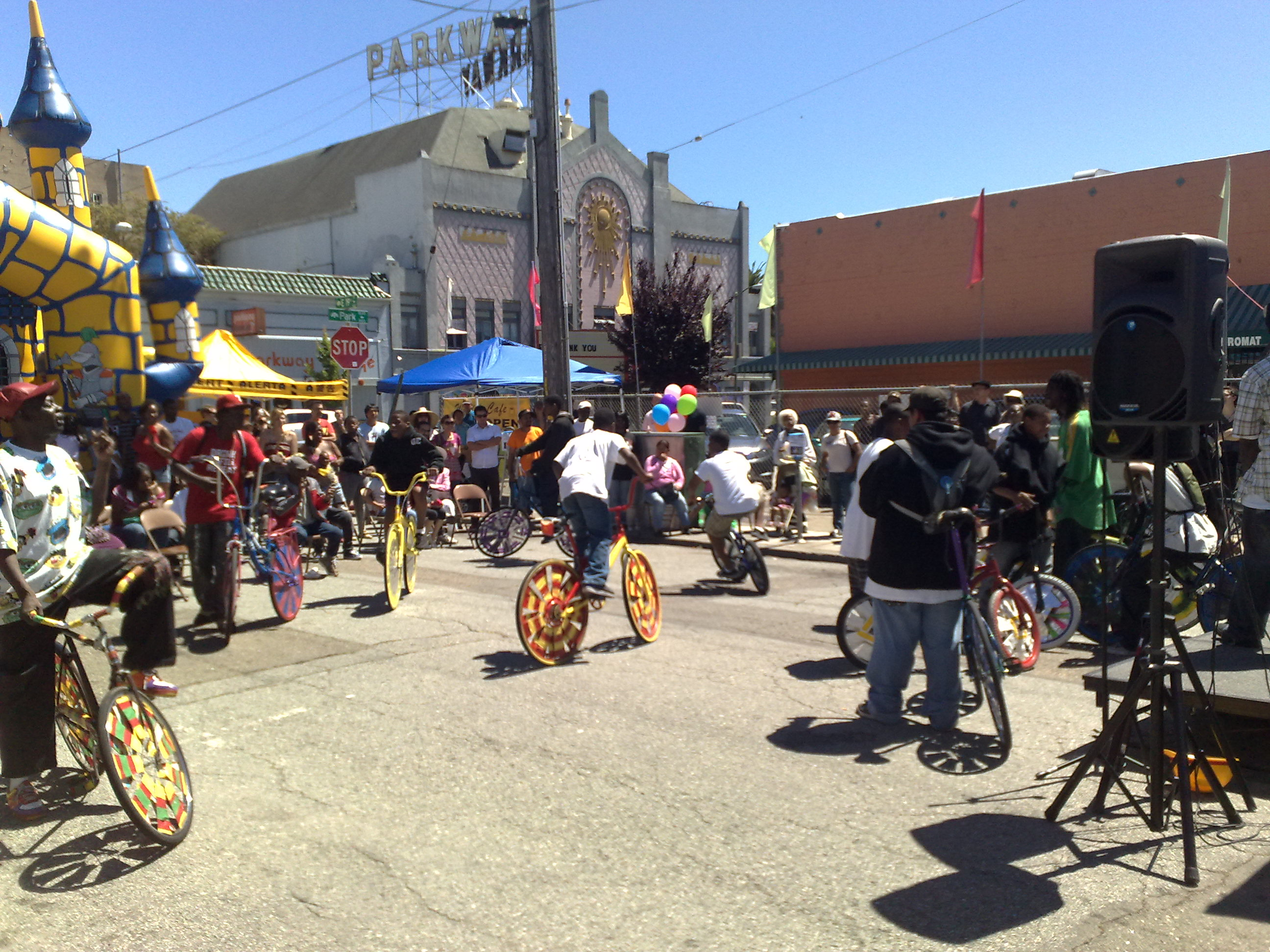
The Scraper Bike Team performing at Town Funk Block Party, Oakland, California

A scraper bike is a bicycle that has been modified by its owner, often with decorated spokes with matching body and wheel colors, using tinfoil, re-used cardboard, candy wrappers and paint. The bike frames themselves are also modified with BMX frames, heightened seats, or custom pieces to create unique bicycles. Scraper Bikes are an offshoot of the 90's era scraper culture of car modification.

“A scraper bike is a piece of art, every artist builds up their bike from scratch using different material, different colors to customize it to fit the artist inside.” - Baybe Champ, 2016.

Scraper bikes gained notoriety in 2007 due to the YouTube music video "Scraper Bikes" by Trunk Boiz.

== The Original Scraper Bike Team ==
The Original Scraper Bike Team was founded by Tyrone “Baybe Champ” Stevenson Jr., aka Scraper Bike King, in 2006 in Oakland, California. Stevenson views the scraper bike movement as a way for local youth to stay active and avoid getting caught up in crime or violence. He wants scraper bikes to be a positive alternative to the struggles which defined his troubled upbringing.

In 2010, Stevenson was profiled in a mini documentary Scrapertown, which was part of a larger series of documentaries called California is a place created by Drea Cooper and Zackary Canepari. In the documentary, Stevenson, claims to have founded the scraper bike movement and says about the practice:

"Scraper bikes is a hobby, and as long as you take your time out of your day to make that bike, that you put the correct material on the spokes, and you spray paint your bike a beautiful color . . . or put something that means something to you, you know, in a decorative way on your bicycle, now, that makes you a scraper bike."

— Tyrone "Babye Champ" Stevenson

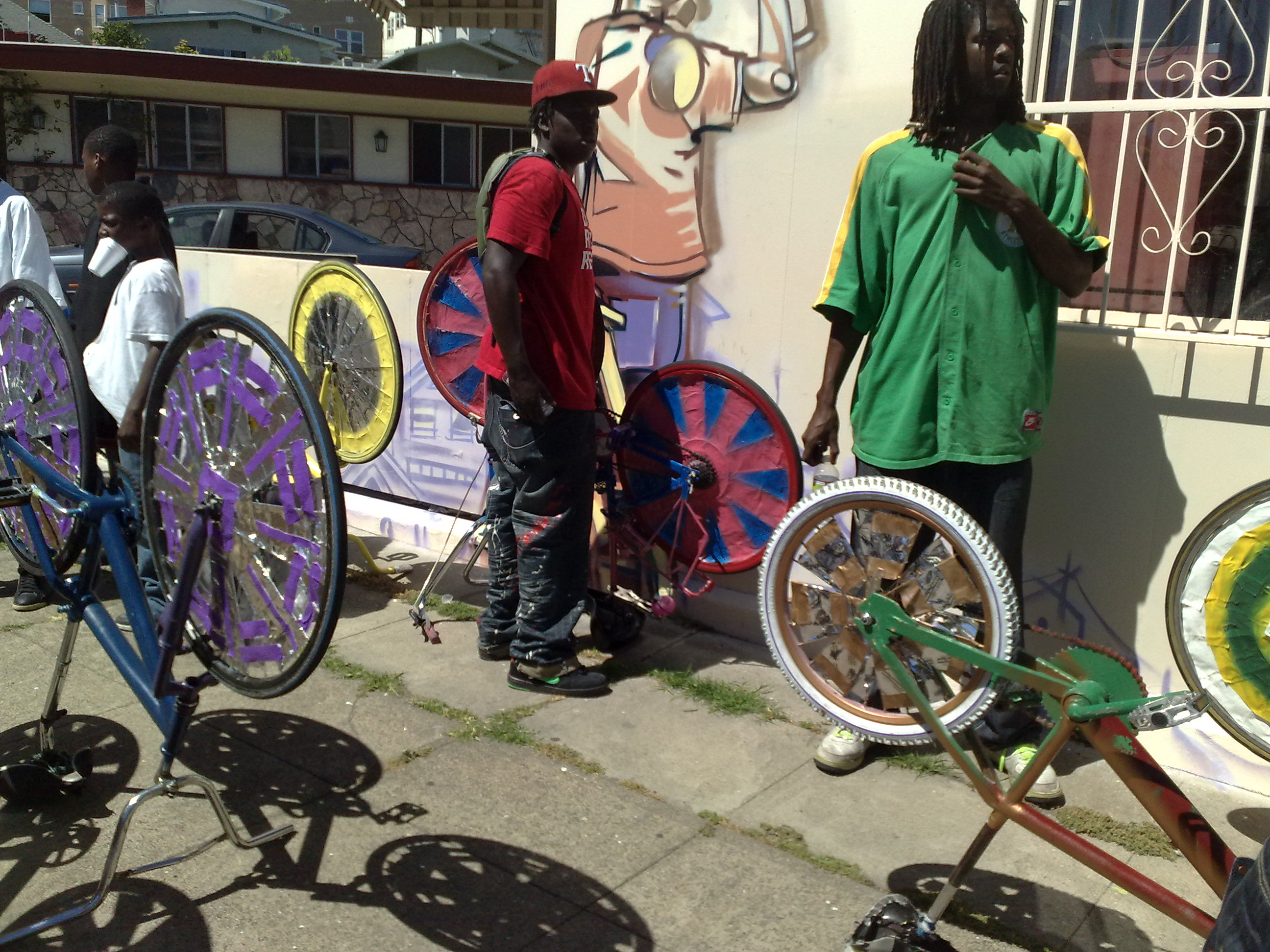
Members of The Original Scraper Bike Team

In 2011, Stevenson received a National Jefferson Award for his public service, honored as one of ten GlobalChangers.

In 2016, with support from Oakland Public Library and Bike East Bay, the Original Scraper Bike Team opened up the Bike Shed, a youth-led, no-fee bike shop, in East Oakland.

Members of the Original Scraper Bike Team were featured in Boots Riley’s 2018 film Sorry to Bother You as background extras.

In 2018, members of the team reported being harassed by San Leandro police, sometimes having their bikes taken. SLPD did not respond to requests to comment on the incidents, but the bikers suspected SLPD officers thought they were breaking traffic laws, or that their bikes were stolen.

On February 11, 2019, rideshare company Lyft invested $700,000 in the East Bay's public transit system. The deal included a partnership with the Original Scraper Bike Team, funding a free bike sharing program run out of their bike shed at the MLK Jr. Library Branch.

== See also ==
- Outline of cycling
- SCRAPER BIKE - Trunk Boiz
