= Scraper (car) =

Type of modified automobile

A scraper is an informal term to describe a modified American-made luxury/family car, usually a General Motors model from the 1980s to current vehicles, typically enhanced with after-market rims. Scrapers are popular in the San Francisco Bay Area of Northern California, usually associated with the hyphy music and lifestyle movement. An example of hyphy is shown in the E-40 lyrics "sittin' in my scraper watching Oakland gone wild". A scraper is a general description and can refer to a number of different model cars. Popular models include the Buick Regal and LeSabre, Pontiac Bonneville, Buick Century, Oldsmobile Delta 88, Buick Riviera, Buick Reatta, Oldsmobile Cutlass Ciera, Oldsmobile Cutlass Supreme, Pontiac Grand Prix, Lexus SC, Chevrolet Caprice Classic, and Chevrolet Impalas, as well as full size conversion vans such as the GMC Vandura. Supercharged automobiles are particularly sought after due to their high performance.

Similar to donks from the South, the cars are highly customized, with large custom rims, custom paint (two-tone is popular as of 2008) and custom interior to match the paint, loud audio (called slaps) and televisions. What makes Scrapers different from Donks is that Donks are typically fifth generation Chevrolet Impalas and Caprices, fourth generation Cadillac Coupe de Villes and third generation Monte Carlos. Donks are usually V8 engine, rear wheeled drive, full sized General Motors sedans and coupes of the 1970s and 1980s. Scrapers on the other hand, are typically late-1980s and 1990s midsized, front wheel drive, six cylinder General Motors sedans.

The trend of customizing these cars were made popular by African American youth. Scraper cars have also inspired the scraper bike movement.

== Gallery ==
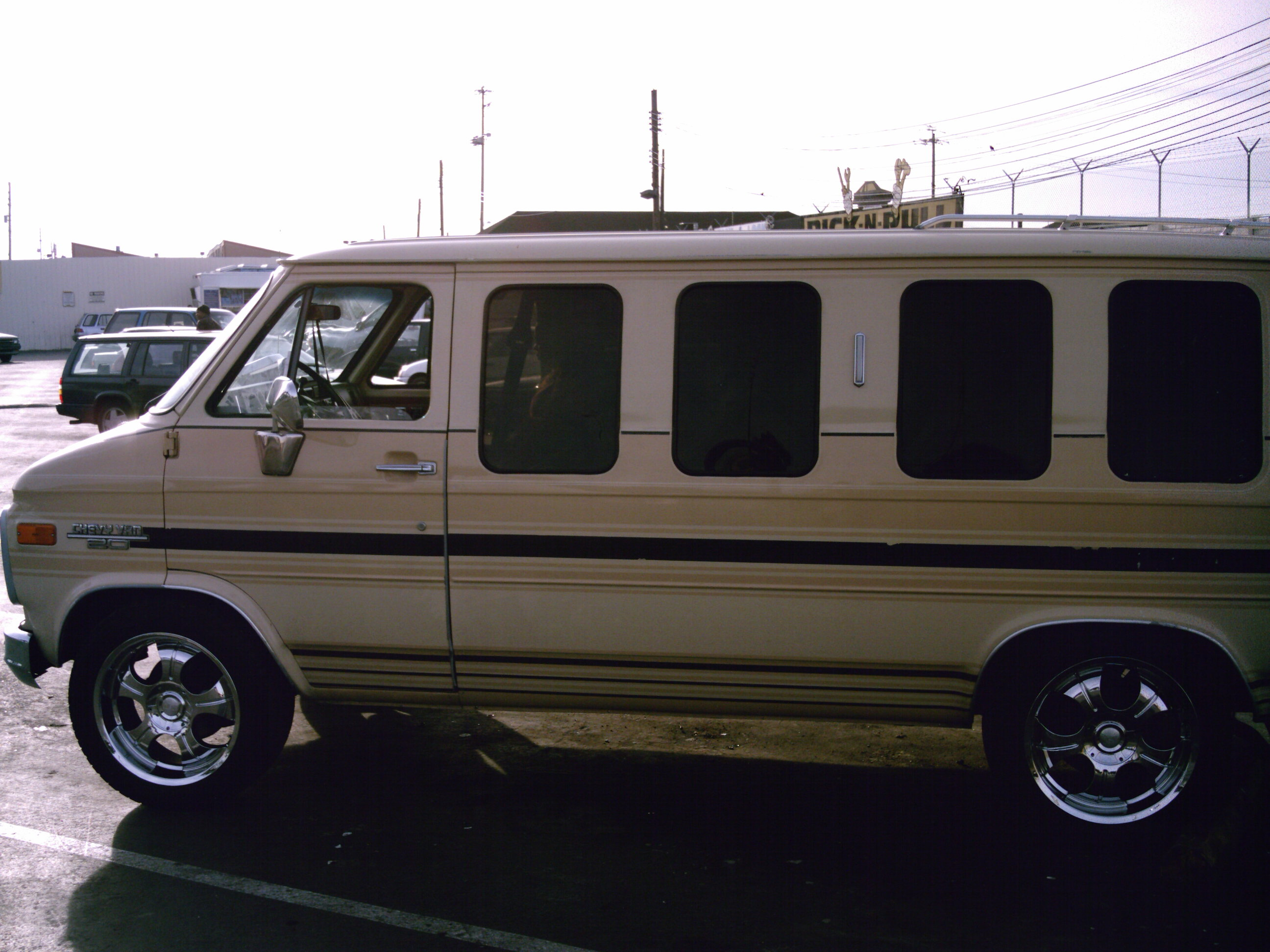
1990 conversion van

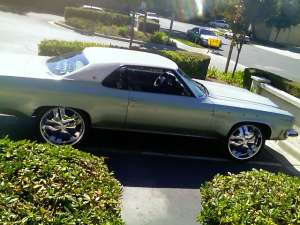
Oldsmobile Delta 88

== See also ==
- Hi-Riser (automobile)
- Lowrider
