= Boot scraper =

Item for scraping mud off boots

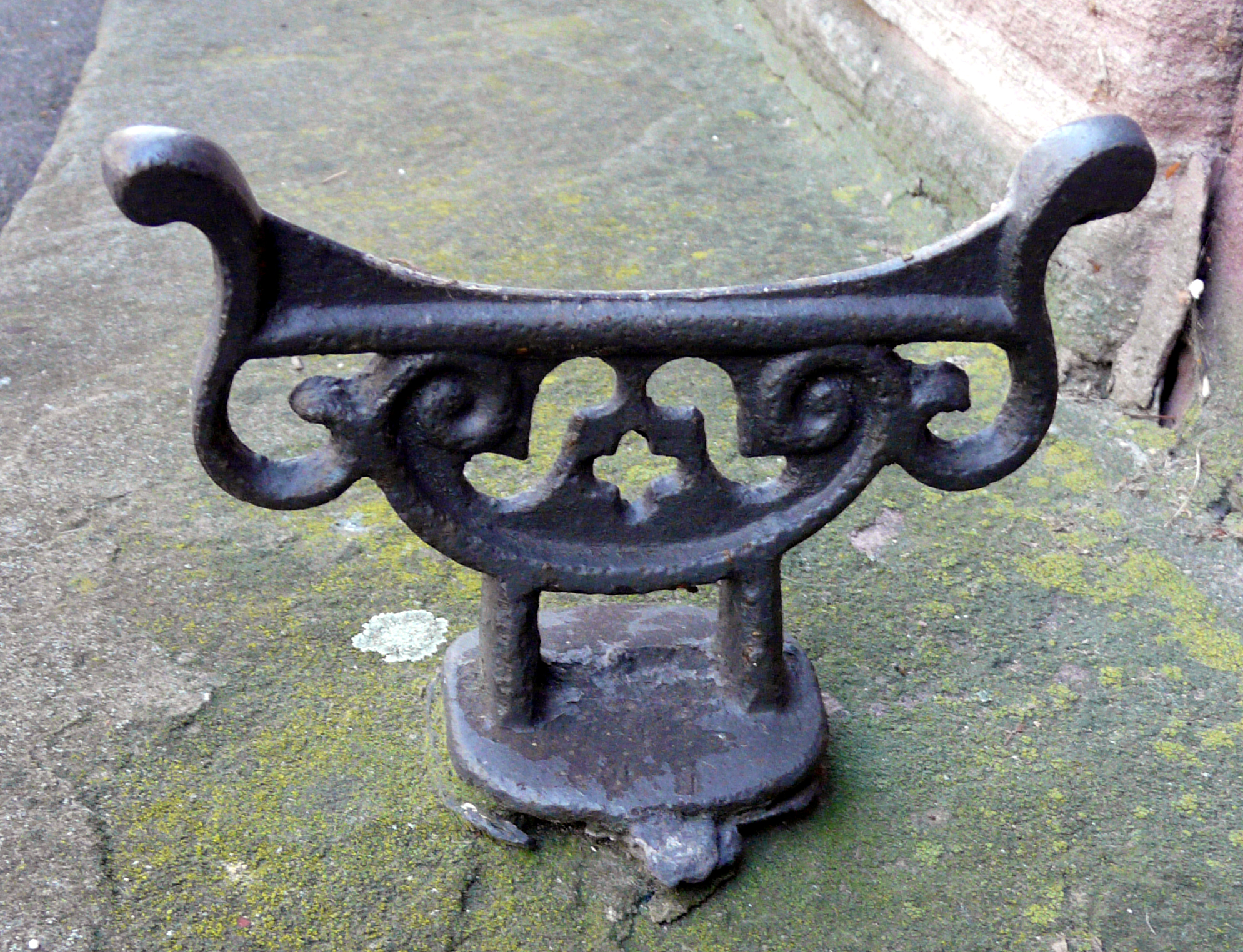
Vintage boot-scraper in Baden-Baden

A boot-scraper, door scraper, mud scraper, or decrottoir is a device consisting of a metal blade, simple or elaborate, permanently attached to the wall or to the sidewalk at the entrance to a building to allow visitors to scrape snow, mud, leaves, or manure off the soles of their footwear before entering.

== Appearance ==
The simplest shoe scrapers could be a rectangular sheet of metal, a horizontal bar, or thick steel wire, but many had more complex shapes made of cast iron or wrought iron with horizontal center piece to scrape off the sole, vertical scraping surfaces to clean the sides of the boot, and other shapes to access concave area by the heel.

On building entrances, boot scrapers could be cemented into the pavement, protrude from a house walls, hide in a niche built into the facade, or sometimes integrated into wrought-iron banisters.

== History ==
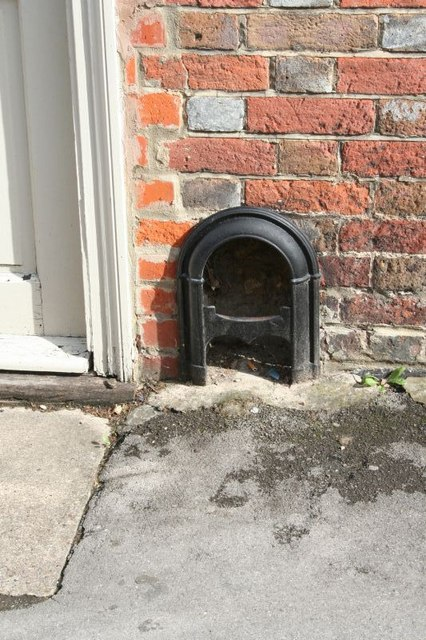
Door scraper in Wallingford

The scrapers appeared at the end of the 18th century, at the same time as the sidewalks and abounded in the 19th century big cities, in the times of horse-drawn carriages and dirt roads. Originally placed directly on foot paths, some were banned as a danger to public safety and placed in niches in the facades.

Through the 20th century, the scrapers of European cities fell into disuse and many were removed during roadworks, or salvaged for ferrous metals.

== Notable locations ==
- At the British Prime Minister's office, 10 Downing Street in London, there are two ornate cast-iron Victorian shoe scrapers symmetrically on the right and left of the door.
- On the top step of the front staircase of Goethe's house in Weimar there is a simple shoe scraper made of a rectangular plate.
- In New York City's Greenwich Village, shoe scrapers are integrated into the banisters of some historic townhouses.
- On Beacon Hill, Boston, Massachusetts, shoe scrapers are a feature of most historic houses.
