= Oxygen Thief =

- Origin: Bristol, England
- Genres: Folk punk, acoustic punk rock
- Occupation: Singer-songwriter
- Instruments: Guitar, vocals
- Years active: 2006 – present
- Labels: Xtra Mile Recordings, Broken Tail Records
- Website: oxygenthiefmusic.com

Oxygen Thief is an English solo musical project of Barry Dolan based in the city of Bristol. He has received national radio recognition and festival slots. Dolan also performs as the solo music project Non Canon.

== Musical career ==
Oxygen Thief began in 2006. He has supported Frank Turner, Mïngle Härde, InMe, Johnny Foreigner, Chris T-T, and Tubelord and is a regular feature at Cheltenham's award-winning 2000 Trees Festival. He first appeared at the festival in 2008. He returned in 2009, 2010, 2011, 2013 and 2014. He was featured in the BBC Introducing in Bristol preview of the 2010 festival. His 2011 appearance at the festival was praised for delivering intensity in a serene setting.

2009 saw the release of a three-way split album, entitled Exclamation at Asterisk Hash, which features fellow solo acoustic performers Ben Marwood and Jim Lockey. The album was released on Broken Tail Records. All three artists toured together in support of the release and played together at the Walk the Line Festival in 2009.

A debut album entitled Destroy It Yourself was released on 9 May 2011, also on Broken Tail Records. The album was praised for its intensity, energy and songwriting. He has been interviewed on Tom Robinson's BBC 6 music show and on BBC Introducing in Bristol. He played the 2012 BBC Introducing stage at the T in the Park festival.

Having toured regularly with acts from their roster, Oxygen Thief signed to Xtra Mile Recordings, formed a three piece electric line-up, released two EPs and a second album.

=== Non Canon ===
Dolan formed a more traditional acoustic side-project in 2016 under the name Non Canon and released a self-titled album in that year on Xtra Mile Recordings. Both projects would continue to operate concurrently, with Non Canon remaining a solo affair.

Non Canon's second album, entitled Non Canon II, was released in 2020, again on Xtra Mile Recordings.

In 2022 Non Canon made their début at 2000 Trees festival in Withington, Gloucestershire.

2022 also saw Non Canon perform at Kendal Calling festival in the Lake District; on the Woodlands Stage alongside Skinny Lister, Sonic Boom Six

In 2025 Non Canon announced their third album, Certain Stories, to be released on Last Night From Glasgow Records.

== Discography ==
=== Albums and EPs ===
- Destroy It Yourself (9 May 2011, Broken Tail Records)
- Accidents Do Not Happen, They Are Caused (9 December 2013, Xtra Mile Recordings)
- One Day This Will All Be Fields (23 March 2014, Xtra Mile Recordings)
- The Half-Life of Facts (16 June 2014, Xtra Mile Recordings)
- Confusion Species (16 November 2018, Xtra Mile Recordings)

=== Split EPs ===
- Exclamation at Asterisk Hash (2009, Broken Tail Records)

=== Other Appearances ===
- Dreaming Of Injured Popstars '25 (Intoxicated Pigeon & Lewis Mckale split) (2025, Aaahh!! Real Records)
