= Walk the Line Festival =

Former music & poetry festival

- Location: Cheltenham
- Years active: 2009–2011
- Website: www.walkthelinefestival.co.uk

The Walk the Line Festival was a music and poetry festival which took place at various venues in Cheltenham, southern England.

The first Walk the Line festival took place on Friday 30 and Saturday 31 October 2009.

== 2011 line-up ==
- Ellen and the Escapades
- Beans on Toast
- Crazy Arm
- Tellison
- Charlie Baxter
- Swift Maneuver
- We Are the Afterglow
- I the Lion
- Pink Crudge Caravan
- The Peppermint Hunting Lodge
- Miss 600
- Changing Horses
- Midwest Dilemma
- Jim Wain
- Ellie Dussek
- Tina Lundelius
- Nina Condron
- Joe Noel
- 4BEL
- Thrill Collins

== 2010 line-up ==
- Brown Torpedo
- Midnight Mile
- Jim Lockey & The Solemn Sun
- The Dawn Chorus
- David Ford
- Hitchhikers of the Galaxy
- The Echoes
- Reachback
- Will Kevans
- I Call A Strike
- Che
- Joe Noel
- Pete Taylor
- Gareth Harper
- Thrill Collins
- Dale Campbell
- Ryan Martin
- Edd Donovan
- Faded Circus
- My First Tooth
- The Strange Death of Liberal England
- 6 Day Riot

== 2009 line-up ==
- 8-fold
- Ben Marwood
- Broadcast 2000
- Byron Vincent
- Chris T-T
- Crazy Arm
- Crowns on Rats Orchestra
- Fighting Fiction
- Lets Tea Party
- Oxygen Thief
- Post War Years
- Sam Isaac
- Talons
- This Town Needs Guns
- Thrill Collins
- Tubelord
