= Stapleton (band) =

Scottish rock band

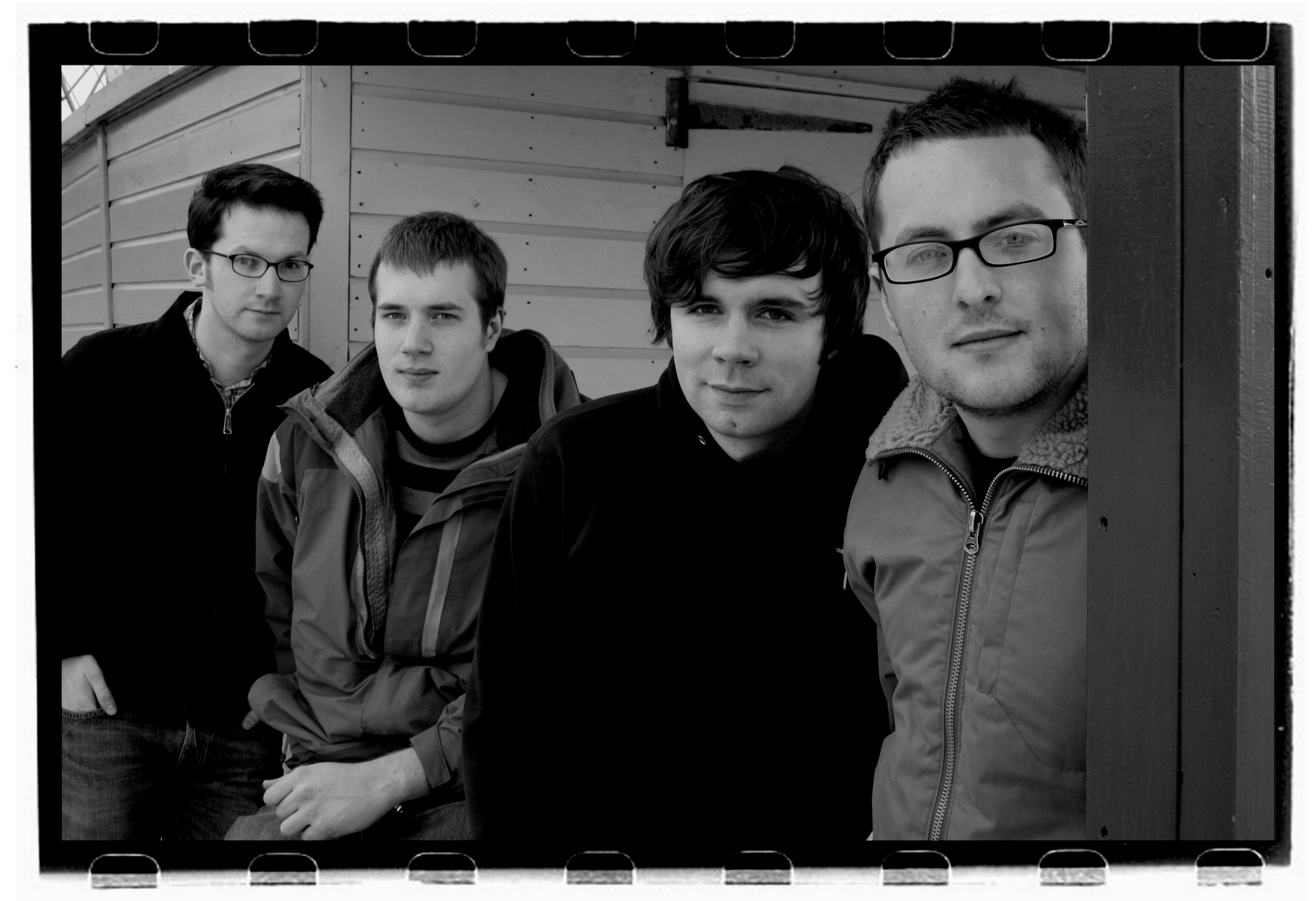
- Stapleton, 2006

Background information
- Origin: Glasgow, Scotland
- Genres: Indie rock, emo, math rock
- Years active: 1997—2008
- Label: Xtra Mile Recordings
- Members: Andrew Cook; Gordon Farquhar; Alistair Paxton; Nico Weststeijn

Stapleton was a rock band who come from Glasgow. They formed in April 1997 and released four albums and two EPs, on a number of independent record labels. The band consisted of Andrew Cook (guitar/vocals), Gordon Farquhar (drums/percussion), Alistair Paxton (vocals/guitar) and Nico Weststeijn (bass).

== History ==
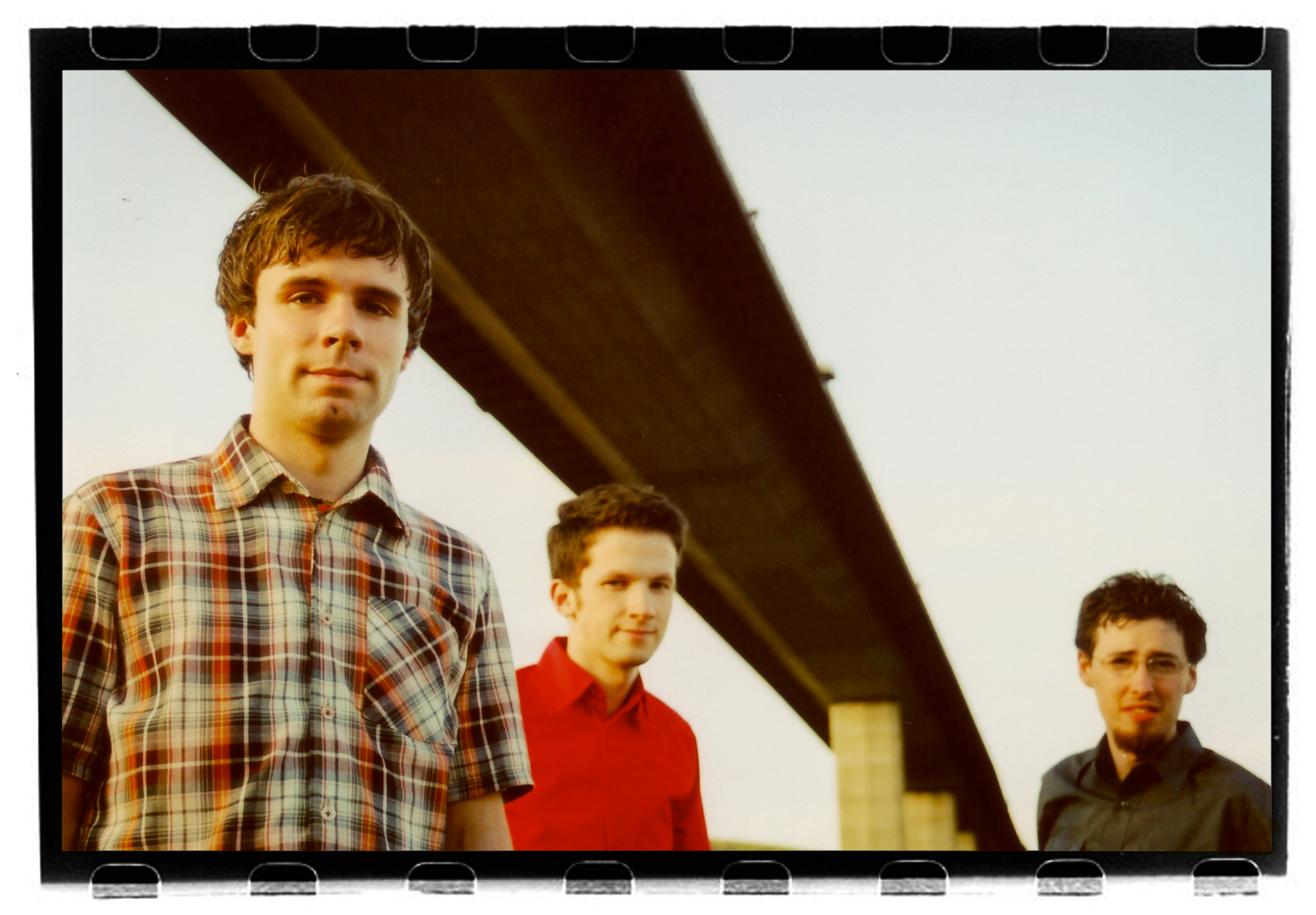
Stapleton, 2002

Stapleton was formed in summer 1997 in Dumbarton by Gordon Farquhar, Alistair Paxton and Ian Arthur.

The turn of the millennium brought an increase in touring for Stapleton, as well as a first full release; 'Rebuild The Pier' on the English label Year 3 Thousand Records. Recorded at the Brill Building, Glasgow over two days by Richie Dempsey, Rebuild The Pier was critically acclaimed by national press and has retrospectively been regarded as a pioneering, landmark record by many bands and individuals. The 2001 follow up, 'On The Enjoyment of Unpleasant Places', achieved a similar status on its release through the legendary English label Subjugation Records. Initial pressings of the record sold very quickly and, indeed, it remained out of print until a repackaged version (including the Icy You EP) was released in 2004. In October 2001, they released the split EP The Boredom of Bread, The Fun of Cake with Norwegian band Beezewax.

2002 saw the release of two EPs by Stapleton; firstly, the 'Icy You' EP, made up of songs from the 'On The Enjoyment' sessions, and secondly, the 'Chez Chef' EP, recorded in London by Pat Collier and Larry Hibbitt. Stapleton toured prolifically around this time, supporting high-profile peers such as Idlewild, Snow Patrol and Hundred Reasons, as well as highly regarded independent touring bands like Lungfish, Weakerthans, Q and not U, Pedro The Lion, Tristeza and Burning Airlines. It was through a Glasgow show with Burning Airlines that Stapleton became involved with the esteemed musician and engineer J. Robbins.

May 2005 saw Stapleton record their third album, 'Hug The Coast', in Robbins' Baltimore studio, The Magpie Cage. Hug The Coast was released in late 2005 on Gravity Records and contained artwork by Grammy nominated artist Jesse LeDoux. Following considerable touring, Stapleton chose to go on hiatus in Summer of 2006, though only after recording a fourth album 'Rest and be Thankful' with their friend and live engineer Robin Sutherland. Rest and be Thankful was released in May 2008 on Xtra Mile Recordings, and was supported by a short UK tour.

Since 2008, they have been on hiatus.

== Musical style ==
They have been categorised as indie rock, math rock and emo.

Their music contains disjointed rhythms, pop hooks, angular and twinkly guitars, strained, emotional vocals, time signature changes and lyrics inspired by poetry. Maximum Rocknroll writer Tom Hopkins described their album On The Enjoyment of Unpleasant Places as a "depressive take on the Promise Ring and Get Up Kids sound" and that it "could easily be one of the indie-rock releases put out by Jade Tree."

They have cited influences including Jawbox, Fugazi, Superchunk, Teenage Fanclub, Mineral, Built To Spill and the Shins.

They have been cited as an influence by Hundred Reasons, the Xcerts and Johnny Foreigner.

== Discography ==
=== Studio albums ===
- Rebuild the Pier (2000) Year 3 Thousand
- On The Enjoyment of Unpleasant Places (2001) Subjugation Records
- On The Enjoyment of Unpleasant Places + Icy You (2004) Gravity DIP Records
- Hug The Coast (2005) Gravity DIP Records
- Rest and be Thankful (2008) Xtra Mile Recordings

=== EPs and split singles ===
- Acres & Yards ('Mosh & Go' 7") released in October 2001 on Fierce Panda Records.
- The Boredom of Bread, The Fun of Cake (split CD with Beezewax) released in October 2001 on Biscay Records
- Icy You (EP) released in April 2002 on Gravity DIP Records
- Chez Chef (EP) released in December 2002 on Gravity DIP Records
- Happy Homes and the Hearts That Make Them / Northwest Corners (split 10" with Dartz!) released in April 2006 on Gravity DIP Records
- Sports Cars And Devil Worship on 'Souvenir', Cable tribute album released October 2006 on Signature Tune Records.
