= My Luminaries =

- Origin: Reading, Manchester, United Kingdom
- Genres: Indie/Alternative
- Years active: 2004–2010
- Labels: Xtra Mile, V2, Gronland, Cottage Industries/Josaka
- Members: James Ewers; Dylan Perryman; Saul Perryman; Sam Stopford; Simon Jones

My Luminaries were a British alternative rock band, formed in London and comprising singer/songwriter James Ewers, guitarist Dylan Perryman, bassist Saul Perryman, drummer Sam Stopford and keyboard/percussionist Simon Jones.

== Biography ==
My Luminaries were formed at Kingston University in 2004. Their first releases were an EP, a live album, and two singles; "Jumping the Great White" and "The Outsider Steps Inside", released on Grönland Records, gained support from BBC Radio 1, BBC Radio 6 Music and XFM. They toured the UK, supporting bands such as Radio 4 (Band) and The Delays.

Their self-produced debut studio album, Order From The Chaos, was released on their own label on 7 June 2010, featuring contributions from new band member and keyboard player Simon Jones, and members of The Band of The Blues and Royals. Recently selected as early bird winners of the Q magazine emerging talent competition, the band went on to play the opening slot on the Queen's Head stage at Glastonbury Festival that year.

My Luminaries split up not long after their Glastonbury appearance, in summer 2010. James Ewers now performs and releases records under the name Lonesound and drummer Sam Stopford performs with various bands.

== Discography ==
=== Albums ===
- ...Let The People Decide (2007) – 7 track live album, bought via a donation on the band's website (50% of proceeds to Jail Guitar Doors Reading campaign), Download
- Order From The Chaos (2010) – Cottage Industries, debut studio album released 6 June 2010, CD & Download

=== EPs ===
- Musaic (2004) – Self-produced, limited to 1000 copies

=== Singles ===
- "All I Really Want" (2006) – Xtra Mile, split 7-inch vinyl with "No1 Son", 500 copies
- "Jumping the Great White" (2006) – Grönland, 7-inch vinyl & download, 1000 copies
- "The Outsider Steps Inside" (2007) – Grönland, 7-inch vinyl & download, 2000 copies
- "Parasol" (2010) – Cottage Industries, Download

=== Compilations ===
- Who? CD (2004) – "A Man Without His Phone" released by Josaka.
- Oxjam Reading Mixtape (2008) – "A Little Declaration" (live)
- 100% Reading (2008) – "A Little Declaration" (live)
