= Stairs to Noise =

EP by The Xcerts
- Released: (United Kingdom) 7 March 2011
- Genre: Alternative rock, emo, indie rock
- Length: 14:55
- Label: Xtra Mile Recordings

The Xcerts chronology
Scatterbrain (2010)	Stairs to Noise (2011)	There Is Only You (2014)

Professional ratings
Review scores
Source	Rating
Rock Sound	8/10 stars

Stairs to Noise is an EP by alternative rock band The Xcerts . The EP consists of five songs plus two bonus tracks and also features a cover of Say Yes by Elliott Smith.

== Track listing ==
All music is composed by The Xcerts except where noted

No.	Title	Length
1.	"Scatterbrain"	3:15
2.	"Tear Me Down"	3:33
3.	"Say Yes" (Elliott Smith)	2:12
4.	"Let's Run"	2:49
5.	"Mannequin Champion"	3:09
Total length:		14:55

Bonus Tracks
No.	Title	Length
6.	"Drinking In L.A." (Bran Van 3000)	3:49
7.	"I Am Home"	3:26
Total length:		22:10

== Personnel ==
- Murray Macleod – guitar, vocals
- Jordan Smith – bass guitar, vocals, piano
- Tom Heron – drums, percussion, vocals
