= In the Cold Wind We Smile =

In The Cold Wind We Smile

Studio album by The Xcerts
- Released: 30 March 2009
- Recorded: 2008/2009
- Genre: Indie rock, post-hardcore, power pop
- Length: 45:50
- Label: Xtra Mile, King Tuts Recordings
- Producer: Dave Eringa

The Xcerts chronology
In The Cold Wind We Smile (2009)	Scatterbrain (2010)

Singles from In the Cold Wind We Smile
- 1. "Just Go Home" Released: 19 November 2007; 2. "Do You Feel Safe?" Released: 14 April 2008; 3. "Crisis In The Slow Lane" Released: 9 March 2009; 4. "Nightschool" Released: 5 October 2009

Professional ratings
Review scores
Source	Rating
Punktastic	4.5/5 stars
Rock Sound	8/10 stars

In The Cold Wind We Smile is the debut album from Scottish band The Xcerts which was released 30 March 2009.

== Overview ==
In The Cold Wind We Smile is the product of years of touring and hard work by The Xcerts. The album was produced by Dave Eringa who had worked with the band on the single "Do You Feel Safe'", and has been described by the band as being created through "personal tragedy".

== Track listing ==
All songs written by The Xcerts

1. "In The Cold Wind We Smile" - 0:58
2. "Home Versus Home" - 4:08
3. "Nightschool" - 2:51
4. "Cool Ethan" - 5:16
5. "Lost But Not Alone" - 3:31
6. "Listen. Don't Panic" - 2:49
7. "Crisis In the Slow Lane" - 4:21
8. "Do You Feel Safe?" - 3:30
9. "Just Go Home" - 3:28
10. "Aberdeen 1987" - 4:09
11. "I See Things Differently" - 4:21
12. "Untitled" - 2:01
13. "Growing Old" (iTunes Exclusive) - 3:02

== Personnel ==
- Murray Macleod – guitar, vocals
- Jordan Smith – bass guitar, vocals, piano
- Tom Heron – drums, percussion, vocals
- Dave Eringa – producer, mixing, piano, organ, theremin
- Duncan Ladkin - phonecall on 'Aberdeen 1987'
- Adam Whittaker - producer and mixing on 'Just Go Home'
- Sandy Buglass - producer 'Aberdeen 1987'
- Ed Woods - mastering
