= Say Yes (Elliott Smith song) =

Song by Elliott Smith

from the album Either/Or
- Released: February 25, 1997
- Genre: Indie folk; indie pop
- Length: 2:19
- Label: Kill Rock Stars
- Songwriter: Elliott Smith
- Producers: Elliott Smith; Tom Rothrock; Rob Schnapf

"Say Yes" is a song by American singer-songwriter Elliott Smith from his third studio album Either/Or, and one of three tracks from Either/Or that was used in the soundtrack of Good Will Hunting.

== Background and content ==
"Say Yes" is one of Smith's widely recognized songs. It is considered happy and optimistic in both instrumentation and lyrics in comparison to the dark tone in most of his other songs. In an interview, Smith said that the song was written about "someone particular, and I almost never do that. I was really in love with someone."

== Live performances ==
Smith performed the song often, even during full band shows, in which he would play the song solo on an acoustic guitar.

== Reception ==
Pitchfork said, "It's a straight-ahead love song, one that dares to hope. Listen closely and you'll hear just how fragile that hope is: Smith whispers most of the song. He wavers. His fingers pluck out a simple question on the acoustic."

== Legacy ==
"Say Yes" has been used in a wide variety of movies, including Hurricane Streets and American Pie Presents: The Book of Love, as well as being covered by Death Cab for Cutie and live by Ben Folds. It was also covered in an episode of One Tree Hill, when Bryan Greenberg sings to his daughter Jenny.

== Cover versions ==
Year	Artist	Album
2004	Dave House	Kingston's Current
2011	The Xcerts	Stairs to Noise
2026	Beabadoobee	Help(2)
