= Jamie Campbell Bower =

English actor and singer (born 1988)

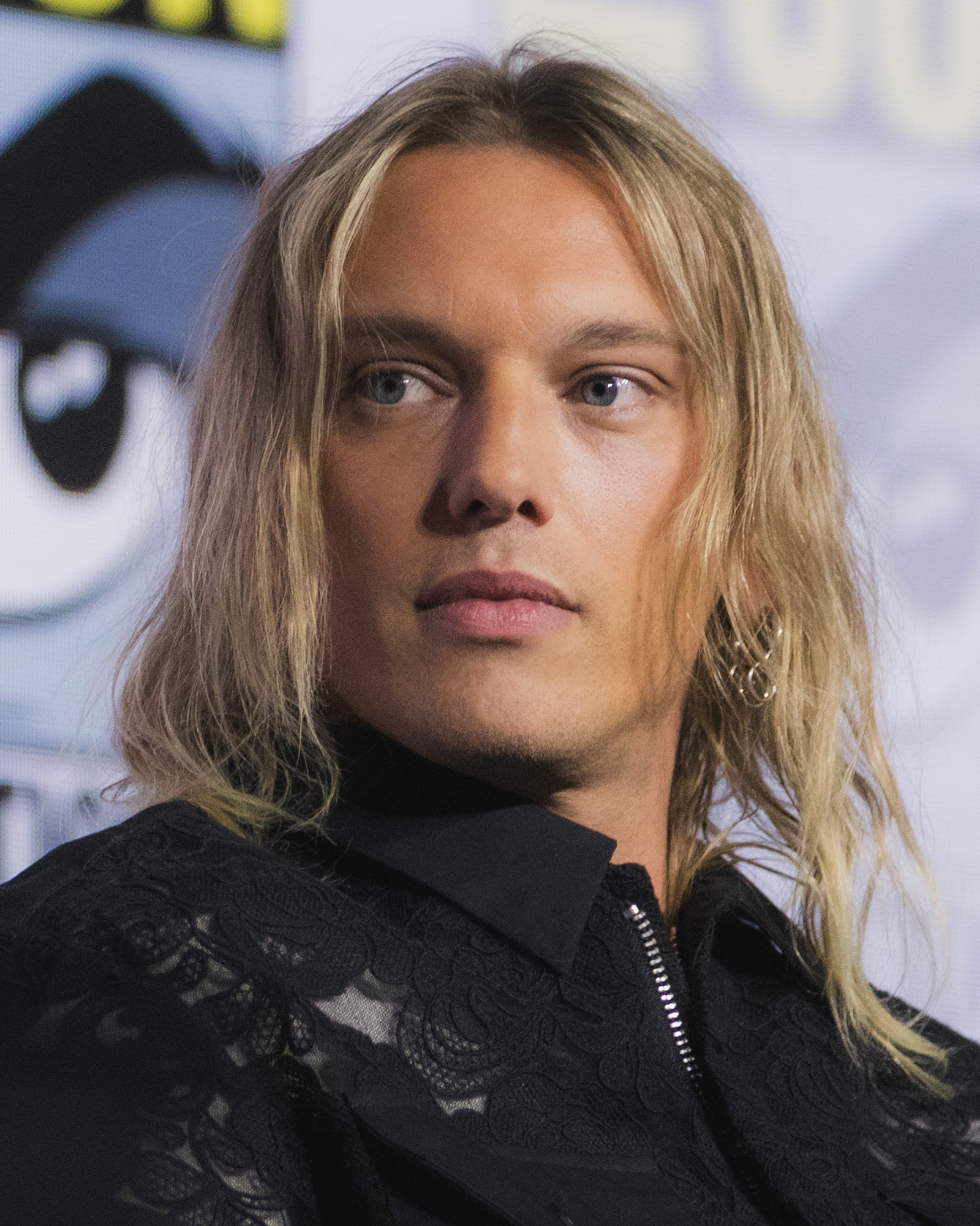
- Bower in 2026
- Born: James Metcalfe Campbell Bower; 22 November 1988 (age 37); London, England
- Occupations: Actor; singer; musician
- Years active: 2007–present
- Partner(s): Bonnie Wright (2009–2012); Lily Collins (2012–2018)
- Musical career
- Genres: Alternative rock; indie rock; punk rock; post-hardcore; hardcore punk; country; blues; dark music; folk rock
- Instruments: Vocals; guitar; piano
- Years active: 2007–present
- Labels: Xtra Mile; Republic; Five to One
- Member of: BloodMagic
- Formerly of: Counterfeit

James Metcalfe Campbell Bower (born 22 November 1988) is an English actor, singer, and musician. He is best known for his role as Henry Creel / Vecna in the fourth (2022) and fifth (2025) seasons of the science fiction horror series Stranger Things, for which he received critical acclaim.

Bower's other roles include the films Sweeney Todd: The Demon Barber of Fleet Street (2007), The Twilight Saga (2009–2012), and the young Gellert Grindelwald in Harry Potter and the Deathly Hallows – Part 1 (2010) and Fantastic Beasts: The Crimes of Grindelwald (2018), as well as the fantasy series Camelot (2011), drama series Will (2017) and the fantasy series The Lord of the Rings: The Rings of Power (2026).

Outside of acting, Bower was the lead singer and guitarist of the punk rock band Counterfeit from 2015 to 2020, when he left to pursue a solo career. In 2024, he formed a new band called BloodMagic.

== Early life ==
James Metcalfe Campbell Bower was born in Hammersmith, London on 22 November 1988, the son of Anne Elizabeth Roseberry and David Bower. His mother is a music manager and his father works for the Gibson Guitar Corporation. He is the maternal great-great-great-great-grandson of Scottish lawyer Sir John Campbell of Airds (1807–1853), Lieutenant Governor of Saint Vincent and the Grenadines. His younger brother, Samuel (born 1994), later played with him in the band Counterfeit.

Bower has had an interest in music and performance from a young age. He started playing the violin as a child, which he was taught using the Suzuki method. He attended Bedales School, a co-educational independent school in Steep, Hampshire, and is a former member of London's National Youth Music Theatre and National Youth Theatre.

== Career ==
=== Acting ===
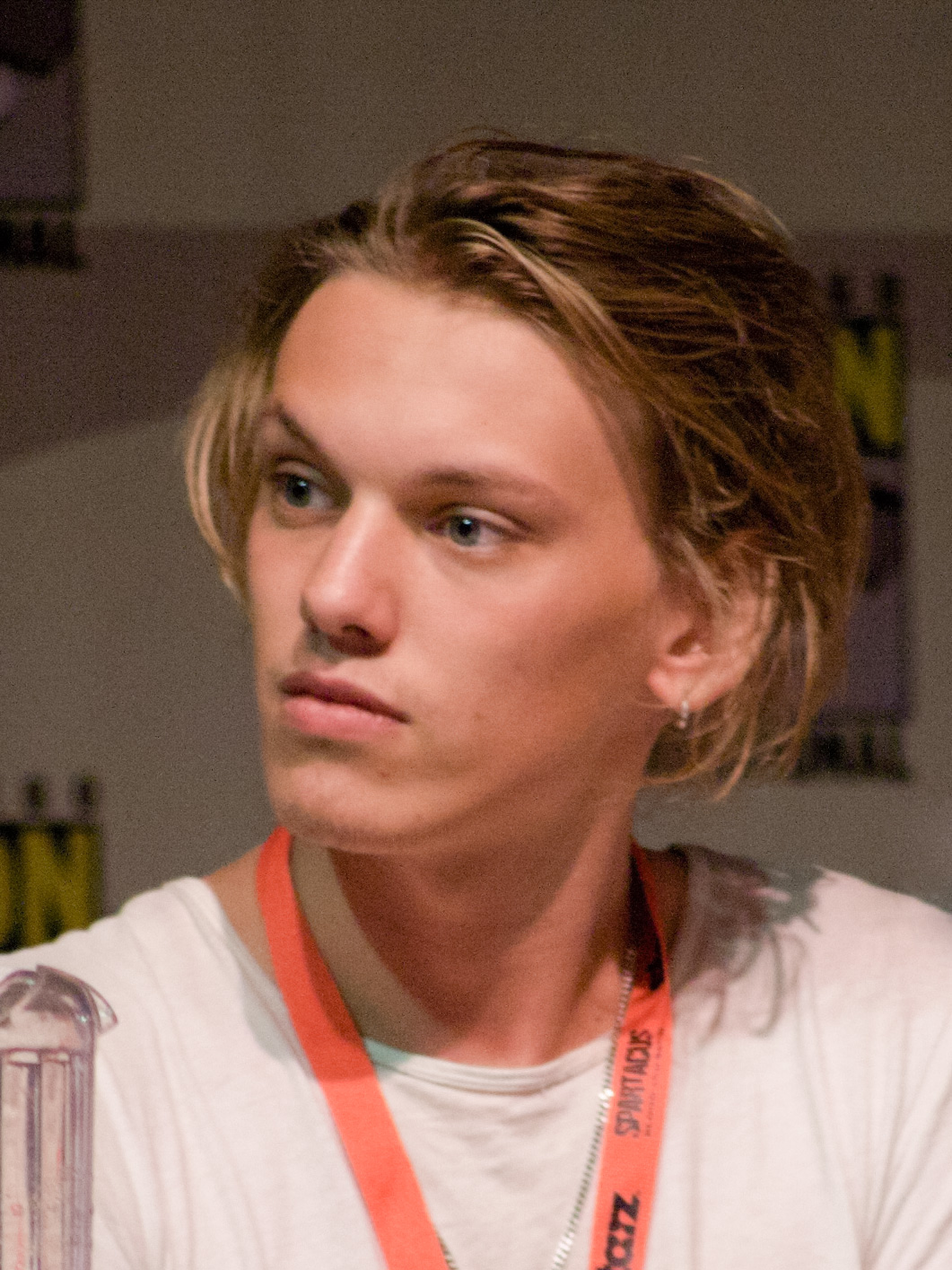
Bower at the 2009 San Diego Comic-Con, California

Bower began his professional career when his friend Laura Michelle Kelly recommended him to her agent. In 2007, he co-starred as Anthony Hope in Tim Burton's Sweeney Todd: The Demon Barber of Fleet Street. In 2008, he played Rocker in the film RocknRolla and Jack in Winter in Wartime. In 2009, he starred in the 2009 remake of the series The Prisoner as Number 11–12.

Also in 2009, he played the vampire Caius Volturi in the film The Twilight Saga: New Moon and both Twilight: Breaking Dawn films. He appeared as a young Gellert Grindelwald (the dark wizard defeated by Albus Dumbledore) in the 2010 film Harry Potter and the Deathly Hallows – Part 1; he reprised this role in the 2018 film Fantastic Beasts: The Crimes of Grindelwald. He played King Arthur in the 2011 television series Camelot. In 2010, he starred in the music video for "Young (Belane)" by The Xcerts.

In 2012, Bower appeared in the music video for "Never Let Me Go" by Florence + The Machine. He played Jace Wayland in The Mortal Instruments: City of Bones, the 2013 film adaptation of The Mortal Instruments series by Cassandra Clare. In June 2015, he began playing the role of Joe in the West End musical Bend It Like Beckham.

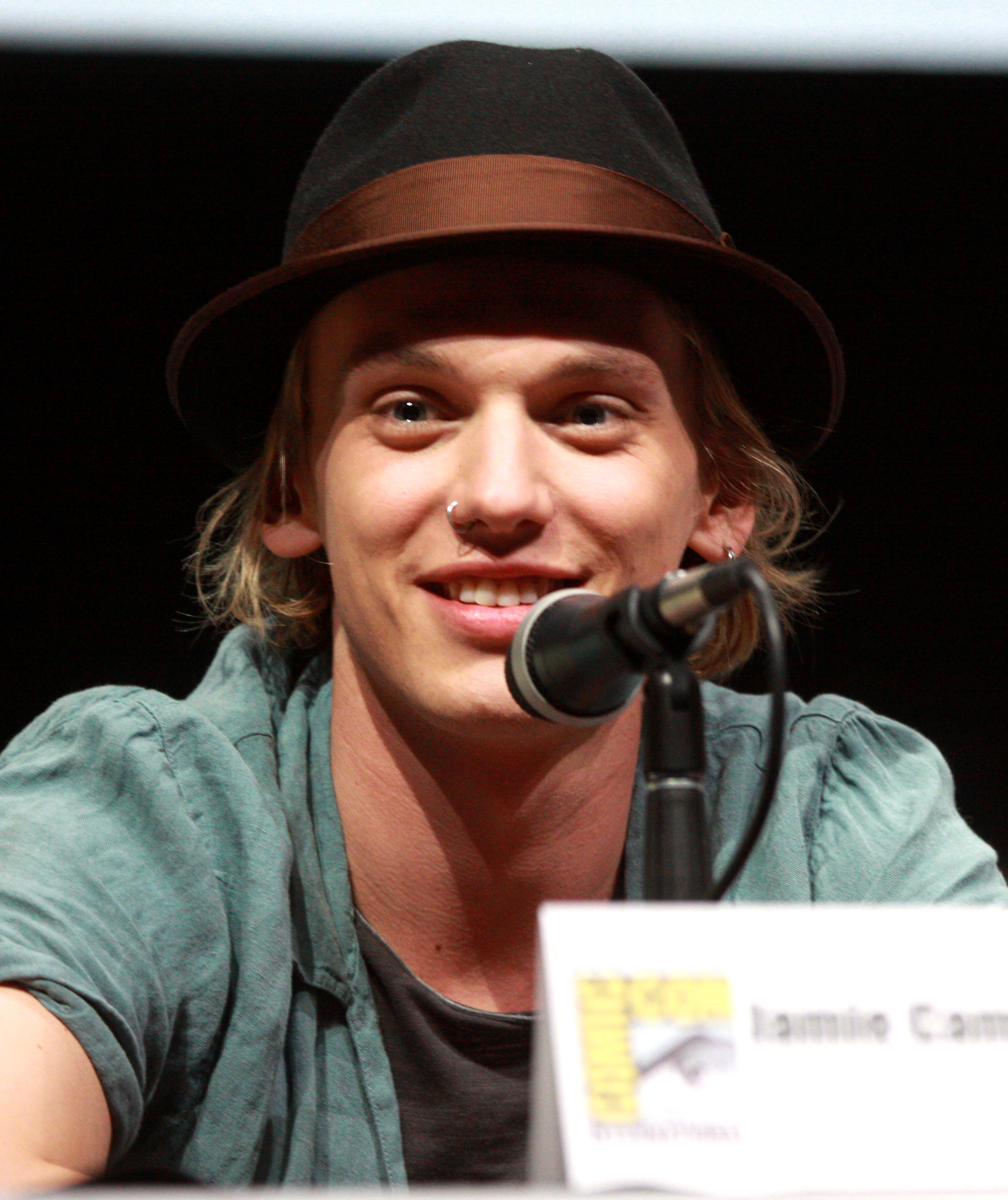
Bower at the 2013 San Diego Comic Con, California.

In July 2017, Bower joined the TNT original series Will. He played the role of gay poet, atheist, and spy Christopher Marlowe, who was jealous of Shakespeare. Christopher is preoccupied with death, the supernatural, and the occult. Bower explained that the series delves into Marlowe's life and refers to him as a naughty boy.

In January 2019, Bower was announced to star in a Game of Thrones prequel series titled Bloodmoon, but HBO later decided not to pick it up. He starred in the 2019 film Six Days of Sistine, distributed by Mbur Indie Film Distributor and co-starring Elarica Johnson. Since 2015, Bower has voiced Skiff in the Thomas & Friends franchise, having contributed to the television show, two home videos, and the feature film Sodor's Legend of the Lost Treasure.

Bower starred as Henry Creel / Vecna in the fourth (2022) and fifth (2025) seasons of the Netflix science fiction horror series Stranger Things. Having make-up applied for the role took up to eight hours per day. His performance in the series garnered critical acclaim and became his most widely known role. In December 2025, he reprised the role for a surprise appearance in the final scene of the play Stranger Things: The First Shadow, marking his Broadway debut.

In July 2026, Amazon Prime Studios and Empire Magazine announced that Bower had been officially cast as the elven lord Celeborn, a powerful Sindarin prince and the long-lost husband of Morfydd Clark's character Galadriel, in the third (2026) season of The Lord of the Rings: The Rings of Power. Bower won the coveted role of Celeborn after an exhaustive search of hundreds of actors; showrunners J.D. Payne and Patrick McKay chose Bower because of his rich, hypnotic voice and his instant, natural on and off-screen chemistry with Morfydd Clark. Bower later revealed at San Diego Comic-Con that he broke down crying when he received the final phone call confirming he had been cast and that he felt his role as Celeborn was a "cathartic antidote" to playing his previous dark and isolating villainous role of Vecna. In bringing Celeborn to life, Bower chose to portray him as a deeply emotional, poetic "lover-boy" whose core strength comes from sensitivity, enduring hope and fully embracing the "eternal, cosmic love" that he shares with his wife. Bower's performance garnered praise from both fans and critics who lauded him as the season's breakout character.

=== Music ===
Bower played drums in a band called William K. He was then the lead singer of the band The Darling Buds, which never released an album and dissolved in June 2015. He became the lead singer and guitarist for the punk rock band Counterfeit, which released its first album in March 2017 and toured the US that year. In November 2020, Bower announced the band's split through their Instagram page. The band had a second album recorded before the split, which was never released. He released music as a solo artist shortly after.

When Counterfeit disbanded, Bower said he felt sadness and grief. He also said he likes writing country songs because of their structure: "As far back as I can remember, whenever I picked up a microphone, it was harder for me to sing wholly in a British accent than to just wail away and drop my Ts or bend notes so it almost sounds American." He also said that he would like to create a musical project inspired by the Divine Comedy, especially Dante's Inferno. Bower is a baritone.

On 1 April 2024, Bower announced the formation of a new band called BloodMagic. He also deleted all his photos from Instagram and created a new account named after the band, featuring drummer Kyle Adams.He released the solo music video "Waiting for Your Love" on 19 March 2026.

On 3 July 2026, Bower made a surprise guest appearance to sing "Machines" with Biffy Clyro at Finsbury Park.

=== Modeling ===
At the beginning of his acting career, Bower was a part-time model with Select Model Management in London. He has posed and offered testimonials for various fashion brands. In December 2013, he joined the cast of Burberry's Campaign Stars for spring/summer 2014; in 2016, he posed for Dolce & Gabbana; and Dior, in 2017, he posed for Hugo Boss's fall/winter campaign; in 2018, he modelled for Fendi, as well as in a photoshoot for Flaunt Magazine with model Erika Linder;in 2023 he appeared in the second Paris Fashion Week of that year for Saint Laurent; in February 2024, during the Milan Fashion Week, he paraded for Tom Ford; and in September 2025, he modelled for Cartier and Ann Demeulemeester. In 2025, he also posed for a Hugo Boss campaign in collaboration with Formula One..

== Musical influences ==
In a 2019 interview, Bower named Placebo, Deftones, Blur, Oasis, and Marilyn Manson as influences on his music career. In a 2022 interview, he cited The Cure as his greatest inspiration during his solo career, especially their album Pornography, and also black metal artists such as Sunn O))), Mayhem, Darkthrone, and Carpathian Forest, particularly when preparing for his role in Stranger Things. He also said that another inspiration for the same role was the Placebo cover of Kate Bush's song "Running Up That Hill", the original of which plays a large role in the storylines of the seasons in which he appears.

== Personal life ==
=== Relationships ===
Bower splits his time between London and Los Angeles.

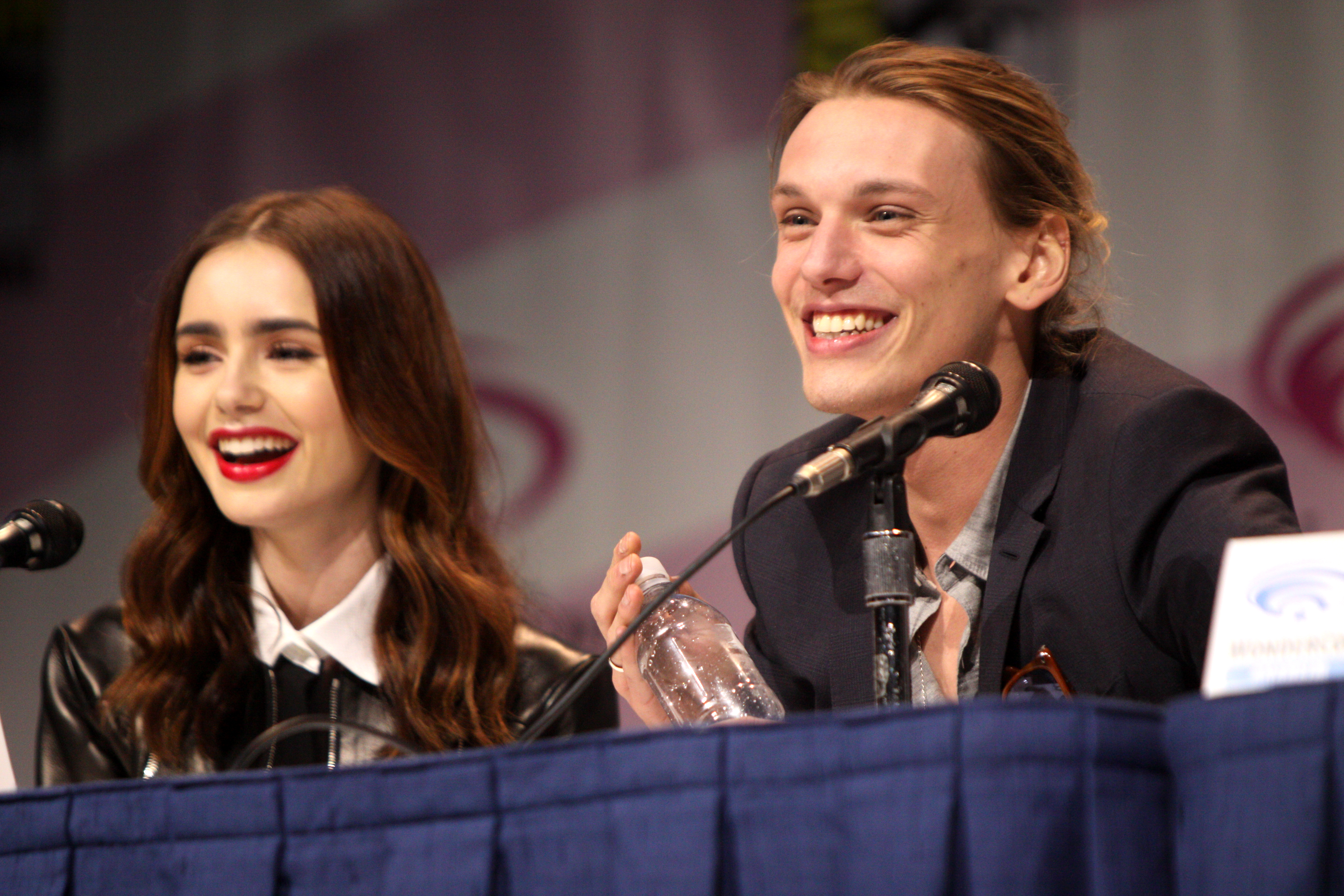
Lily Collins and Bower at the 2013 WonderCon in Anaheim, California.

In February 2010, Bower was confirmed to be dating English actress Bonnie Wright, whom he had met on the set of Harry Potter and the Deathly Hallows – Part 1. They confirmed their engagement in April 2011, but announced that they had amicably split up in June 2012.

From 2012 to 2018, Bower was in an on-off relationship with English-American actress Lily Collins.

In 2025, Bower began dating social media personality Elena Taber.

=== Health ===
In a December 2007 interview, Bower revealed that he has mild dyslexia.

Bower has often discussed his past struggles with alcoholism and mental health issues. He said in September 2019, "I'm in recovery, so one of the first things that they teach you when you're in recovery is to be super honest about what it is that you're feeling, like guilt, shame, fear, sadness, whatever it is, the most important thing is, and it's the hardest thing to do, is just express exactly what it is that you're feeling." His band Counterfeit also released the song "It Gets Better" about the topic.

In July 2022, Bower wrote on Twitter, "12 and a half years ago I was in active addiction. Hurting myself and those around me who I loved the most. It got so bad that eventually I ended up in a hospital for mental health. I am now 7 1/2 years clean and sober. I have made many mistakes in my life [but] each day is a chance to start again. Atone for mistakes and grow. For anyone who wakes up thinking 'oh god not again' I promise you there's a way. I'm so grateful to be where I am, I'm so grateful to be sober. I'm so grateful to be. Remember, we are all works in progress." He was praised by mental health organizations such as Turning Point and High Watch Recovery Center.

In September 2022, Bower said that he grew up with anxiety and that he used alcohol to relieve his fears and insecurities. He also stated that he suffered from what he called "spiritual malady" during addiction, and that he would never have thought of detoxing at the age of 27. In an interview with la Repubblica two months later, he said, "The great thing is that healing begins just when you realize that nothing can be controlled, and you start to let go. When you understand that by expressing yourself with fragility, instead of worsening, the opinion of others towards you increases, and the knowledge of others also improves. I had lost connection with my voice, with beauty, with spirituality."

== Performances and works ==
=== Film ===
Key
†	Denotes films that have not yet been released

Year	Title	Role	Notes	Ref.
2007	Sweeney Todd: The Demon Barber of Fleet Street	Anthony Hope		
2008	RocknRolla	Rocker		
2008	Winter in Wartime	Jack		
2009	The Twilight Saga: New Moon	Caius		
2010	Harry Potter and the Deathly Hallows – Part 1	Young Gellert Grindelwald		
2010	London Boulevard	Whiteboy		
2011	Anonymous	Young Earl Oxford		
2011	The Twilight Saga: Breaking Dawn – Part 1	Caius		
2012	The Twilight Saga: Breaking Dawn – Part 2	Caius		
2013	The Mortal Instruments: City of Bones	Jace Wayland		
2015	Thomas & Friends: Sodor's Legend of the Lost Treasure	Skiff (voice)		
2016	Caer	A Man	Short film	
2018	Fantastic Beasts: The Crimes of Grindelwald	Young Gellert Grindelwald		
2019	Six Days of Sistine	Jean-Baptiste		
2024	Horizon: An American Saga	Caleb Sykes		
2024	Witchboard	Alexander Babtiste		
2024	Emmanuelle	Sir John		
TBA	True Haunting †	Ed Becker	Post-production	

=== Television ===
Year	Title	Role	Notes	Ref.
2007	The Dinner Party	Douglas	Television film	
2009	The Prisoner	11–12	6 episodes	
2011	Camelot	King Arthur	10 episodes	
2015–2020	Thomas & Friends	Skiff	Voice; 6 episodes	
2017	Will	Christopher Marlowe	10 episodes	
2019	Urban Myths	Mick Jagger	Episode: "Mick Jagger and Princess Margaret"	
2022–2025	Stranger Things	Henry Creel / One / Vecna	Main role (seasons 4–5)	
2026–present	The Lord of the Rings: The Rings of Power	Celeborn	Main role (season 3)	

=== Theatre ===
Year	Title	Role	Venue	Notes	Ref.
1999	Honk!		Royal National Theatre; London, England		
2001	The Dreaming		Yvonne Arnaud Theatre; Guildford, England		
2001	The Dreaming		George Square Theatre; London, England		
2001	The Dreaming		Edinburgh Fringe Festival; Edinburgh, Scotland		
2015	Bend It Like Beckham	Joe	Phoenix Theatre; London, England		
2025	Stranger Things: The First Shadow	Henry Creel	Marquis Theatre; New York, United States	One-time cameo	

=== Video games ===
Year	Title	Role	Notes	Ref.
2024	Stranger Things VR	Vecna / Henry Creel		
2026	Dead by Daylight	Henry Creel	Playable character; likeness	

=== Music videos ===
Year	Artist	Title	Role	Ref.
2010	The Xcerts	"Young (Belane)"	Fan	
2012	Florence and the Machine	"Never Let Me Go"	Love interest	

=== Audio ===
Year	Title	Role	Notes
2025	The Trials	Theo Deschamps	Main role
2026	The Trials: Winter Solstice	Theo Deschamps	Main role

=== Solo discography ===
==== Singles ====
Year	Released	Title	Album
2020	2 December	"Paralysed"	Prologue (Live from the Alter)
2020	9 December	"Start the Fire"	Prologue (Live from the Alter)
2022	14 April	"Crow"	Non-album singles
2022	27 May	"Run On" (feat. King Sugar)	Non-album singles
2022	27 May	"Devil In Me"	Non-album singles
2022	12 August	"I Am"	Non-album singles
2023	20 October	"Heaven in Your Eyes" (feat. Tom Yankton & Mikey Demus)	Non-album singles
2023	29 November	"Watch Em Burn"	Non-album singles
2023	29 November	"Wait for Me"	Non-album singles

== Awards and nominations ==
Year	Award	Category	Work	Result	Ref.
2011	National Movie Awards	One to Watch: Brits Going Global	Anonymous	Won	
2014	Teen Choice Awards	Choice Movie Actor: Action	The Mortal Instruments: City of Bones	Nominated	
2023	Critics' Choice Super Awards	Best Villain in a Series	Stranger Things	Nominated	
2023	MTV Movie & TV Awards	Best Villain	Stranger Things	Nominated	
2023	MTV Movie & TV Awards	Best Fight (shared with Millie Bobby Brown)	Stranger Things	Nominated	

== See also ==
- List of British actors
