= Scatterbrain (The Xcerts album) =

Studio album by The Xcerts
- Released: 4 October 2010
- Recorded: February 2010
- Genre: Indie rock, post-hardcore
- Length: 38:32
- Label: Xtra Mile Recordings
- Producer: Mike Sapone

The Xcerts chronology
In the Cold Wind We Smile (2009)	Scatterbrain (2010)	Stairs to Noise (2011)

Singles from Scatterbrain
- 1. "Slackerpop" Released: 7 June 2010; 2. "Carnival Time" Released: 25 August 2010; 3. "Young (Belane)" Released: 27 September 2010; 4. "Scatterbrain" Released: 7 March 2011

Professional ratings
Review scores
Source	Rating
AllMusic	3/5 stars
Punktastic	5/5 stars
Rock Sound	8/10 stars
Daily Dischord	8/10 stars

Scatterbrain is the second album from Scottish band The Xcerts which was released on 4 October 2010.

== Track listing ==
All music is composed by The Xcerts.

No.	Title	Length
1.	"Tar"	1:00
2.	"Scatterbrain"	3:15
3.	"Distant Memory"	4:31
4.	"Gum"	3:19
5.	"Slackerpop"	2:35
6.	"I Scare Easy"	3:23
7.	"Young (Belane)"	3:33
8.	"He Sinks. He Sleeps"	4:14
9.	"Carnival Time"	3:44
10.	"Hurt With Me"	5:18
11.	"Lament"	5:00
Total length:		39:47

== Personnel ==
- Murray Macleod – guitar, vocals
- Jordan Smith – bass guitar, vocals, piano
- Tom Heron – drums, percussion, vocals

Mike Sapone - Production
