= Sleep Room =

English alternative rock band

- Origin: Reading, Berkshire, England
- Genres: Alternative rock Progressive rock Experimental rock
- Years active: 2001–present
- Label: Mechanical Republic
- Members: Nigel Weston, Ryan Cook, Richard King, Alex Bowen
- Website: www.sleep-room.com

Sleep Room is an English alternative rock band from Reading, Berkshire. Their music has been noted for an original sound and emotive style.

Sleep Room has made four albums and performed at the 2012 charity event Oxjam in Reading. Sleep Room takes their name from the conspiratorial brainwashing technique allegedly used by the CIA in the early 1970s Project MKUltra, which involved sensory deprivation and sub-conscious behavioural response to sound.

== History ==
The founding members of Sleep Room, Nigel Weston and Ryan Cook, met on Berkshire's online music community Josaka, and following the break-up of Weston's earlier unnamed band, the two auditioned for drummers and bassists, eventually being impressed by Richard King's John Bonham-esque dynamics.

=== (2001–2002) ===
Sleep Room made their debut performance at The Grey Horse in Kingston with bass player Oli Griffiths, earning a return headline booking. Following a number of gigs in and around Berkshire, Sleep Room made their debut recording project at Sound Machine Studios in Fleet. The record Rats May Dream Of Maze received a positive review and sold well.

Sleep Room began to refine their sound, working on new music and performing in Guildford, Reading, and Bracknell.

=== (2003–2007) ===
In 2003, Oli Griffiths parted company with the group. Weston, Cook, and King began developing a more challenging catalogue of sounds for the group, while keeping an eye out for a replacement bass player.

Cook came in contact with David Treasure at a pub in Wokingham, The Hope and Anchor. Treasure was a session musician looking to be part of something more creative than his regular fee-paying cover band work. Treasure joined the band starting with a short live stint in Reading. Sleep Room was then ready with their newly developed sound and progressive material.

In 2004, Sleep Room returned to the recording studio, this time opting for the professional services of producer and engineer Lewis Childs and Earth Terminal in Odiham. This brought about the record Shut Windows, Draw Curtains receiving positive critical review and regular airplay on BBC Radio Berkshire. BBC Radio 6 also featured their song "Patriot" on a radio show and it won "Download of the month".

After some additional live performances, Sleep Room returned to the studio to record their new collection of tracks, the album - It Still Moves All The Same, attracting support gigs and they performed in the national music event, the Oxjam Festival, and began selling albums in the United States of America.

Their bassist, Treasure, dropped from the band in 2006. Sleep Room continued to write and perform with their three members again. Rewriting much of their catalogue to incorporate the bass-lines into Weston's and Cook's guitar pieces, Sleep Room's sound evolved more and changed, with the group continuing to perform as a three piece.

=== (2008-2009) ===
In late 2008, Alex Bowen auditioned for the band and won the spot as the band's new bass player. Bowen tightened up the newly written, previously bass-less tracks, and inspired several new songs with music of his own. Following a number of gigs around Reading, Bowen and Sleep Room began to write their fourth studio album.

Entering Earth Terminal for a third time, Lewis Childs and Sleep Room recorded and mixed the five song EP Gone in three days, released in 2010.

Members

- Nigel Weston – guitar 1, synthesiser
- Ryan Cook – guitar 2, vocals
- Richard King – drums and percussion
- Alex Bowen – bass guitar
- Jonathan Amphlett - guitar 2, synthesiser

== Discography ==
Rat's May Dream Of Maze (2002)

- "Everything You Know Is Wrong"
- "Odium"
- "Smile Show"
- "Video"
- "Hearing Sunlight"

Shut Windows, Draw Curtains (2004)

- "Dave & Sarah"
- "Patriot"
- "Monkey Board"
- "Dub"
- "Brand New Day"

It Still Moves All The Same (2007)

- "The Souvenir"
- "Groupthinkerror"
- "Ananias"
- "Toy Boy" (cover of Sinitta's hit song)
- "The 12th of Spring"
- "Mechanical Republic"

Gone (2010)

- "Species"
- "Temper Temper"
- "Wipe That Smile Off Your Face"
- "People Turning On Each Other"
- "Quietly Turning Pages"
- "Origin Of Species"
