= This Is Not What You Had Planned =

Studio album by Ben Marwood
- Released: August 4, 2008
- Genre: Folk
- Length: 20:58
- Label: Broken Tail Records

This Is Not What You Had Planned is the 2nd mini-album from Reading singer-songwriter Ben Marwood, released on 4 August 2008 via Broken Tail Records. In November 2008, "Five Little Secrets" was selected as Times Online's 'track of the day'.

== Critical reception ==
Professional ratings
Review scores
Source	Rating
The-Mag	7/10 stars
Room Thirteen	11/13 stars

The album has gathered favourable reviews, with critics praising Marwood's "rare lyrical and musical grace" and "intelligently quirky lyrics".

== Track listing ==
1. "Question Marks" - 2:12
2. "Five Little Secrets" - 3:49
3. "I Know What I Did Last Summer" - 3:10
4. "Heathens" - 3:33
5. "Claire" - 3:18
6. "Fake It" - 2:22
7. "Like It or Not" 3:14
