= The Maybes? =

English indie rock band

- The Maybes? performing live at the Mathew Street Festival 2006

Background information
- Origin: Liverpool, England
- Genres: Indie, Rock, Alternative
- Years active: 2002–2009
- Labels: Xtra Mile Recordings
- Past members: Nick Otaegui (bass, vocals); Nick Ellis (guitar, vocals); Lee Smith (guitar, vocals); Timo Tierney (guitar, vocals); Dominic Allen (drums)
- Website: MySpace

The Maybes? were an English indie rock band from Liverpool. The group was made up of five principal members: Nick Ellis, Nick Otaegui, Lee Smith, Timo Tierney and Dominic Allen. They had been performing since 2002, and in early 2006 they were signed to Xtra Mile Recordings. The band disbanded in 2009. Most of the band members of The Maybes? later formed another indie rock band called The Tea Street Band in 2010.

== Background ==
All the members of the band are from the Anfield and Kensington districts of Liverpool, and were close friends before the band started. They attended Liverpool Community College. They have been performing gigs since 2002, supporting other bands as well as their own shows. They are well known in Liverpool for their band name being spray painted in many places.

In 2006, The Maybes? having just been published by Universal Music Publishing Group, signed their first record deal with London-based record label, Xtra Mile Recordings. The label released The Maybes?' first record, "Stop, Look & Listen", on a split 7" vinyl with DARTZ! in January 2006 (as part of the Xtra Mile Single Sessions) and went on to sign the band. They also brought out "Olympia" their debut EP, in October 2006. The band were one of the headline acts at the Liverpool Mathew Street Music Festival in 2006, and again in 2007, when they also appeared at the Knowsley Hall Music Festival. They started recording their album in late 2007 and when they had finished recording in early 2008, they set about touring Britain again and playing for local and national radio shows. It was around the same time their second single "Talk About You" was released on download.

In April 2008, they launched their own nightclub at Nation (the home of Cream) called Sonic Temple, and in the summer of 2008 the band played some of the big music festivals such as the V Festival, Isle of Wight Festival and Reading and Leeds Festival, as well as seeing the release of their debut album Promise produced by "Head", alongside the release of singles "Boys" and "Summertime". The single "Promise" is also used as the theme song for the 2010 Friends Provident t20 cricket competition in England and Wales. The track is played when the teams take to the field at the start of the game and is played during the hand shakes.

The Guardian editor described Promise as sharp and full of shot, bittersweet guitar-pop songs. Describing the first single, "Boys", as a "cover version of a Hamburg or Cavern-era Beatles tune", while "Summertime" was characterized as "typical [song] with its eager, rasping Scouse vocals and frantic drums that gallop towards the exuberant chorus". The title track dysplayed "sheer psychedelic dub-rock delirium", and the editor compared it to The Coral, Can's Soon Over Babaluma, Public Image Ltd's "Death Disco".

== Members ==
- Nick Ellis – guitar, vocals
- Lee Smith – guitar, vocals
- Timo Tierney – guitar, vocals
- Nick Otaegui – bass, vocals
- Dominic Allen – drums, percussion

== Discography ==
=== Albums ===
- Promise (15 September 2008)
- The Love Story (2010)

=== EPs ===
- "Olympia'" (16 October 2006)

=== Singles ===
Year	Name	Information
2006	"Stop, Look & Listen"	7" record with DARTZ!, (part of Xtra Mile Single Sessions).
2008	"Talk About You"	Download
2008	"Boys"	Download
2008	"Summertime"	Download and 7" record

== See also ==
- Xtra Mile Recordings
