= This Is My Ship =

Studio album by Dartz!
- Released: February 12, 2007
- Genre: Dance-punk
- Label: Xtra Mile

Dartz! chronology
This Is My Ship	The Sad History of the Village of Alnerique

Professional ratings
Review scores
Source	Rating
Drowned in Sound	7/10
Punknews.org	3.5/5 stars

This Is My Ship is the debut album by Dartz!, released in 2007. Like most of their other releases, the cover artwork is by Dave House.

== Critical reception ==
NME called the album "nerdy, snappy and smart; this is jerk-punk played by real live jerks."

== Track listing ==
1. "Network! Network! Network!"
2. "A Simple Hypothetical"
3. "Once, twice, again!"
4. "Cold Holidays"
5. "Prego Triangolos"
6. "Laser Eyes"
7. "St. Petersburg"
8. "Harbour"
9. "Documents"
10. "Fantastic Apparatus"
11. "Teaching Me To Dance"
12. "The Lives Of Authors"
13. "Ulysses" (hidden track)
