= There Is Only You (album) =

Studio album by The Xcerts
- Released: (United Kingdom) 3 November 2014
- Genre: Alternative rock, indie rock, power pop
- Label: Raygun Music
- Producer: Dave Eringa, Paul Steel

The Xcerts chronology
Stairs to Noise (2011)	There Is Only You (2014)	Hold On To Your Heart (2018)

Singles from There Is Only You
- 1. "Shaking In The Water" Released: 21 July 2014; 2. "Pop Song" Released: 7 October 2014

Professional ratings
Review scores
Source	Rating
AllMusic	4/5 stars
Kerrang!	4/5 stars
Punktastic	(Positive)
Rock Sound	9/10 stars

There Is Only You is the third album from alternative rock band The Xcerts released on 3 November 2014 through Raygun Music.

There Is Only You reached number 96 in the UK album chart in its first week of release and number 8 in the Rock album chart.

== Track listing ==
All music is composed by The Xcerts

No.	Title	Length
1.	"2.12.12"	0:54
2.	"Live Like This"	3:36
3.	"Shaking In The Water"	3:10
4.	"Kick It"	3:04
5.	"I Don't Care"	3:52
6.	"Kevin Costner"	3:02
7.	"Teenage Lust"	4:05
8.	"Pop Song"	2:59
9.	"Kids On Drugs"	3:22
10.	"She"	3:03
11.	"There Is Only You"	5:43
Total length:		36:28

Bonus Tracks
No.	Title	Length
12.	"Bored"	3:50
13.	"Heaven"	3:06
14.	"Steal My Sunshine" (Len)	3:33
Total length:		43:24

== Personnel ==
- Murray Macleod – guitar, vocals
- Jordan Smith – bass guitar, vocals, piano
- Tom Heron – drums, percussion, vocals
