= Josaka =

- Parent company: Josaka Music Limited
- Founded: 1999
- Founder: Kevin Harrington, Jim Bowes
- Genre: Various
- Country of origin: UK
- Location: Reading, Berkshire; London

Josaka is an independent record label and music company based jointly in Reading and London, England.

== History ==
Josaka was founded in 1999 in order to host a presentation given by Kevin Harrington to a Gartner Group conference in Amsterdam.

For the next nine years, the domain josaka.com was used as a promotional platform for Berkshire-based bands, in the form of a forum.

In 2004, Josaka started an annual music showcase, held at Reading's South Street Arts Centre until 2006. In 2007, the event moved to Reading's Plug 'n' Play venue for one year only. The same year, Josaka became affiliated with the Reading leg of the Jail Guitar Doors charity.

== Record label ==
In 2006, Josaka Music Limited was formed as record label and music management company. The label's first release was in April 2006; a double a-side by Wire Jesus entitled "The Intruder/Another Day".

The following artists have released music through the Josaka label:

- Ben Marwood
- Quiet Quiet Band
- Hello Wembley
- Rebus
- The Trouble With Me
- To The Barricades
- Tripwires
- Wire Jesus
- Secret Rivals
- Sleep Room
