= Dartz! =

English rock band

- Origin: Middlesbrough, England
- Genres: Indie rock Math rock Dance-punk
- Years active: 2005–2009
- Labels: Xtra Mile Recordings (UK); Deep Elm Records (US)
- Members: Henry J. Carden (guitar); William K.J. Anderson (bass/vocals); Philip J. Maughan (drums/vocals); Nico S. Taylor (guitar)

Dartz! (often stylised as DARTZ!) were a Math rock group from Middlesbrough, England, who formed at the beginning of 2005. They are signed to Xtra Mile Recordings in the UK and Deep Elm in the US, and released one full-length album, one mini-album, three singles and a split 7-inch via Xtra Mile, as well as an EP on Sunderland based DIY micro-label Fakedream Records, and a split 10-inch with Scottish band Stapleton on Gravity DIP.

They recorded with the record producer Mark Williams (Biffy Clyro, Bloc Party, Fightstar, Nine Black Alps, Million Dead, Ghymp) at the Battery Studios in London and they toured with Get Cape Wear Cape Fly, Hot Club De Paris and The Rumble Strips, as well as also playing with bands including The Futureheads, Melt Banana, The Young Knives, Make Believe and Foals. More recently Dartz added long-time collaborator Nico Taylor, once the logistics man for the band, to the line-up.

In September 2007, the band announced that they were going to take a break from touring to focus on their education, with Maughan studying English Literature at Oxford University and Anderson studying English and Film at Sheffield Hallam. The decision was explained in an article in The Times newspaper entitled "Bands Balancing Uni With Fame", although it was criticised by the NME in the magazine's review of "The Sad History Of The Village Of Alnerique" in September 2008. Dartz have had three videos featured on MTV2, all of which were directed by Teesside University lecturer Marcus T. Diamond. A fourth video, for the track "Cold Holidays", was recorded by Wife Swap cameraman Rob Taylor during the band's tour with I Was a Cub Scout.

They broke up on 2 July 2009 according to their MySpace page. Their final live outing was at The Peel, Kingston. Support came from former touring partner Get Cape. Wear Cape. Fly.

== Discography ==
=== Albums ===
Date Of Release	Title
12 February 2007	This Is My Ship
22 September 2008	The Sad History of the Village of Alnerique

=== Singles/EPs ===
Date Of Release	Title
14 May 2007	Fantastic Apparatus / Cold Holidays 10-inch
29 January 2007	"Once Twice, Again!"
23 October 2006	"St. Petersburg"
April 2006	split 10-inch (with Stapleton)
23 January 2006	split 7-inch (with The Maybes?)
17 October 2005	Who Built the Buildings? EP
May 2005	Dartz demo EP
