= Counterfeit (band) =

English punk rock band

- Origin: London, England, UK
- Genres: Punk rock; post-hardcore; hardcore punk; hard rock
- Years active: 2015–2020
- Labels: Xtra Mile; Republic
- Past members: Jamie Campbell Bower; Roland Johnson; Sam Bower; Jimmy Craig; Tristan Marmont

Counterfeit (stylised as COUNTERFEIT.) were an English punk rock band from London, England, formed in 2015, consisting of lead vocalist and guitarist Jamie Campbell Bower, guitarist Sam Bower, guitarist Tristan Marmont, bassist Roland Johnson and drummer James Craig.

The band signed to Xtra Mile Recordings on 28 November 2016. Their debut album Together We Are Stronger was released on 17 March 2017. The band signed to Republic Records in 2019 and released the singles "It Gets Better", "The New Insane", "11:44" and "Getting Over It", which were to have been from their second album.

On 11 November 2020, Campbell Bower announced the dissolution of the band on their Instagram page.

== Band members ==
Past Members

- Jamie Campbell Bower – lead vocals, guitar (2015–2020)
- Roland Johnson – bass, vocals (2015–2020)
- Tristan Marmont – guitar, vocals (2015–2020)
- Sam Bower – guitar, vocals (2015–2020)
- Jimmy Craig – drums, percussion (2015–2020)

== Awards ==
AIM Awards
The AIM Independent Music Awards shines a spotlight on the UK's independent music industry, presented annually by Association of Independent Music.

| Year | Nominee / work | Award | Result |
|---|---|---|---|
| 2017 | Counterfeit | Best Live Act | Won |

KERRANG! Awards
The Kerrang! Awards is an annual music awards show in the United Kingdom, founded by the music magazine, Kerrang!.

| Year | Nominee / work | Award | Result |
|---|---|---|---|
| 2016 | Counterfeit | Best British Newcomer | Nominated |

== Discography ==
Studio album

- Together We Are Stronger (2017)

Extended plays

- Come Get Some (2015)
- Enough (2016)
- Addiction (2016)

Singles

- It Gets Better (2019)
- The New Insane (2020)
- 11:44 (2020)
- Getting Over It (2020)
