= Billy Pettinger =

Canadian-born singer and songwriter (born 1982)

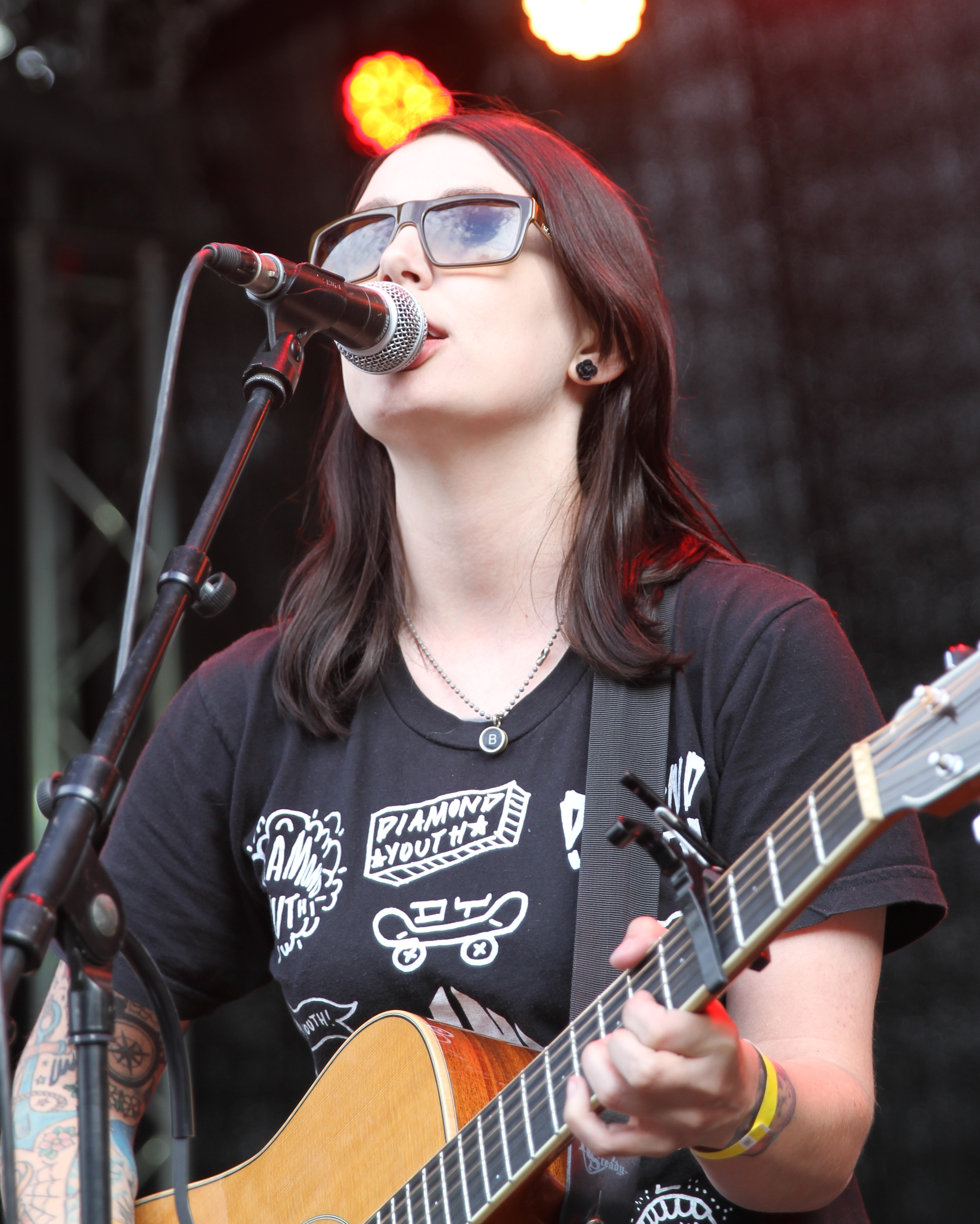
- Pettinger performing in 2014

Background information
- Born: February 1, 1982 (age 44)
- Origin: Vancouver, British Columbia, Canada
- Genres: Rock, folk, alternative
- Occupations: Musician, songwriter
- Instruments: Vocals, guitar, piano, drums, bass, harmonica
- Years active: 1998–present
- Label: Lost Records
- Member of: Billy and the Lost Boys
- Website: www.billythekidonline.com

Billy Pettinger (born February 1, 1982) is a Canadian-born singer and songwriter who performs under the moniker Billy the Kid. She also fronts the rock band Billy and the Lost Boys and played drums in Vancouver's longest surviving Ramones cover band, the Ramores.

Pettinger has been the primary songwriter in all of her original projects and has collaborated with such artists as Garth Hudson from The Band and Bob Dylan, Raine Maida of Our Lady Peace, Jack Lawrence of the Raconteurs and Atom Willard of Alkaline Trio.

Her debut release The Lost Cause was produced and engineered by Raine Maida, lead singer of Canadian rock band Our Lady Peace. Billy the Kid released a fan-funded album with Jamie Candiloro (Ryan Adams/Willie Nelson) entitled "Stars, Exploding" in November 2012. In February 2013 she released "Perspective" where she played all instruments and acted as producer. 2014 saw the release of "Horseshoes & Hand Grenades" produced by Frank Turner and released on Xtra Mile Recordings.

== Biography ==
=== Personal life ===
At 16 Pettinger put together her first band, in which she was the lead singer and guitarist. The Blue Collar Bullets featured You Say Party drummer Devon Clifford, who died in 2010.

=== Billy and the Lost Boys ===
After The Blue Collar Bullets, Pettinger put together a lineup of musicians and within twelve days of forming, Billy and the Lost Boys played their first concert. They would go on to release 3 albums, 2 music videos and in May 2004 reached #1 on the Canadian College and Campus Radio Charts. Their music was featured in television shows Radio Free Roscoe, Degrassi: The Next Generation and The Collector. She self-engineered and produced the 4th Billy and the Lost Boys album titled "Off The Map".

=== Billy the Kid & The Southside Boys ===
Billy the Kid & The Southside Boys released 1 album in 2011. Their song "Where We Are" was featured in the television show Continuum.

=== Solo work ===
Pettinger released a five-song EP called The Lost Cause on November 14, 2008. The EP contains the songs "These City Lights", "Drown", "The Drugs", "I Don't Want to Know" and "Just Trying to Get By". The Lost Cause was produced by Our Lady Peace front man Raine Maida. An additional six songs were recorded at the same time, some of which were re-recorded for the album "Ours.” In 2010 Billy the Kid began a crowd sourcing campaign to fund her debut full-length album. In addition to pre-orders and specialized bundles, she traveled across the continent to play fundraisers, anniversaries, birthday parties and private concerts as well as go camping, white water rafting and rock climbing with fans. The result was the appropriately titled album "Ours". Pettinger's songs have appeared in The Voice, A&E's Biography, Miami Ink, America's Got Talent, American Idol, My 600 LB Life, Larry Crowne starring Tom Hanks and Foreverland featuring Juliette Lewis. She has toured/performed with Against Me!, Dropkick Murphys, Billy Bragg, Chuck Ragan, The Weakerthans, Face to Face and Laura Jane Grace.

=== Billy the Kid & Your Funeral ===
In 2023 Billy the Kid partnered with long time friends Atom Willard of Alkaline Trio and Marc Jacob Hudson of Laura Jane Grace & the Devouring Mothers to form Billy the Kid & Your Funeral.

== Discography ==
=== Billy the Kid ===
- 2008: The Lost Cause
- 2012: Stars, Exploding
- 2013: Perspective
- 2014: Horseshoes & Hand Grenades
- 2019: Look At Me, I'm Fine
- 2021: There Is Only Right Now
- 2023: Can You Find A Way
- 2025: Prelude to A New Dream

=== Billy the Kid & Your Funeral ===
- 2024: I Have to Do This

=== Billy the Kid & the Southside Boys ===
- 2011: Ours

=== Billy the Kid & the Lost Boys ===
- 2002: Strong Like Prawn
- 2004: Breaking Down the Barriers That Break Down Your Music
- 2005: Breaking Down the Barriers That Break Down Your Music Remastered
- 2006: Yet Why Not Say What Happened?
- 2008: Off The Map
