= Hold On to Your Heart =

Studio album by The Xcerts
- Released: 19 January 2018
- Recorded: 2017
- Studio: Brighton Electric, Brighton, UK
- Genre: Indie rock, alternative rock, power pop, glam rock, jazz rock
- Length: 36:36
- Label: Raygun Music
- Producer: Dave Eringa, Gary Clark

The Xcerts chronology
There Is Only You (2014)	Hold On to Your Heart (2018)

Singles from Hold On to Your Heart
- 1. "Feels Like Falling in Love" Released: 3 July 2017; 2. "Daydream" Released: 15 September 2017; 3. "Hold On to Your Heart" Released: 17 November 2017; 4. "Daydream" Released: 12 January 2018

Hold On to Your Heart is the fourth studio album by alternative rock band The Xcerts, released on 19 January 2018 through Raygun Music. The first single, "Feels Like Falling in Love", was released on 3 July 2018, and the second single, "Daydream", was released on 15 September. The album was announced on 21 September, and the third single, "Hold On to Your Heart", was released on 17 November. The fourth and final single, "Drive Me Wild", was released on 12 January 2018, and features Will Gardner of Brighton-based progressive rock band Black Peaks on saxophone. Gardner also played saxophone on the album's closing track, "Cry". The album was the band's first to reach the top 40 of the UK Albums Chart, spending one week at number 40.

== Reception ==
Professional ratings
Aggregate scores
Source	Rating
Metacritic	70/100
Review scores
Source	Rating
AC Rock Reviews	10/10
All Things Loud	8/10
All Heard	5/5 stars
DIY	4/5 stars
Dork	5/5 stars
Genre is Dead	5/5 stars
God is in the TV	9/10
Invicta	9.5/10
Louder Than War	7.5/10
Outline	8/10
New Noise	4.5/5 stars
Rock Sins	9/10
Rock Sound	8/10
The Line of Best Fit	7.5/10
The Skinny	5/5 stars

The album received praise from Jake Haseldine of the When the Horn Blows saying that "[Despite some odd tracks, it is] one of the strongest albums the XCERTS have released so far and being the shortest of all four, it definitely packs a punch."

Chris Hilson of the Punktastic compared the new album to the style of Jimmy Eat World.

Kerrang! Magazine ranked "Hold On To Your Heart" at number 12 on their top 50 best albums of 2018. Rock Sound Magazine ranked it as the 24th best album of the year.

== Accolades ==
Publication	Accolade	Rank	Ref.
Kerrang!	Top 50 Albums of 2018	12	
Rock Sound	Top 50 Albums of 2018	24	

== Track listing ==
All music is composed by The Xcerts (except where noted).

No.	Title	Length
1.	"The Dark" (The Xcerts, Gary Clark)	3:00
2.	"Daydream"	2:26
3.	"Feels Like Falling in Love"	3:12
4.	"First Kiss Feeling"	3:39
5.	"Crazy"	3:32
6.	"Hold On to Your Heart"	3:37
7.	"Drive Me Wild"	3:50
8.	"We Are Gonna Live"	3:35
9.	"Show Me Beautiful" (The Xcerts, Gary Clark)	4:00
10.	"Cry"	5:44
Total length:		36:36

Late One Night EP
No.	Title	Length
1.	"Daydream"	2:57
2.	"Feels Like Falling in Love"	3:50
3.	"Cry"	5:18
4.	"Hold On to Your Heart"	3:46
5.	"The Dark"	2:51
Total length:		18:42

== Personnel ==
- Murray Macleod – guitar, vocals
- Jordan Smith – bass guitar, vocals, piano
- Tom Heron – drums, percussion, vocals
- Will Gardner – saxophone (tracks 7 and 10)
- Ryan Burnett – guitar (Late One Night EP)
- Dave Eringa – producer
- Gary Clark – producer
- Mike Lord – producer (tracks 7 and 10), producer, mixing (Late One Night EP)
- Chris Sheldon – mixing
- John Davis – mastering
- Ed Woods – mastering (Late One Night EP)

== Charts ==
Chart performance for Hold On to Your Heart
Chart (2018)	Peak position
UK Albums (OCC)	40
