= Ben Marwood =

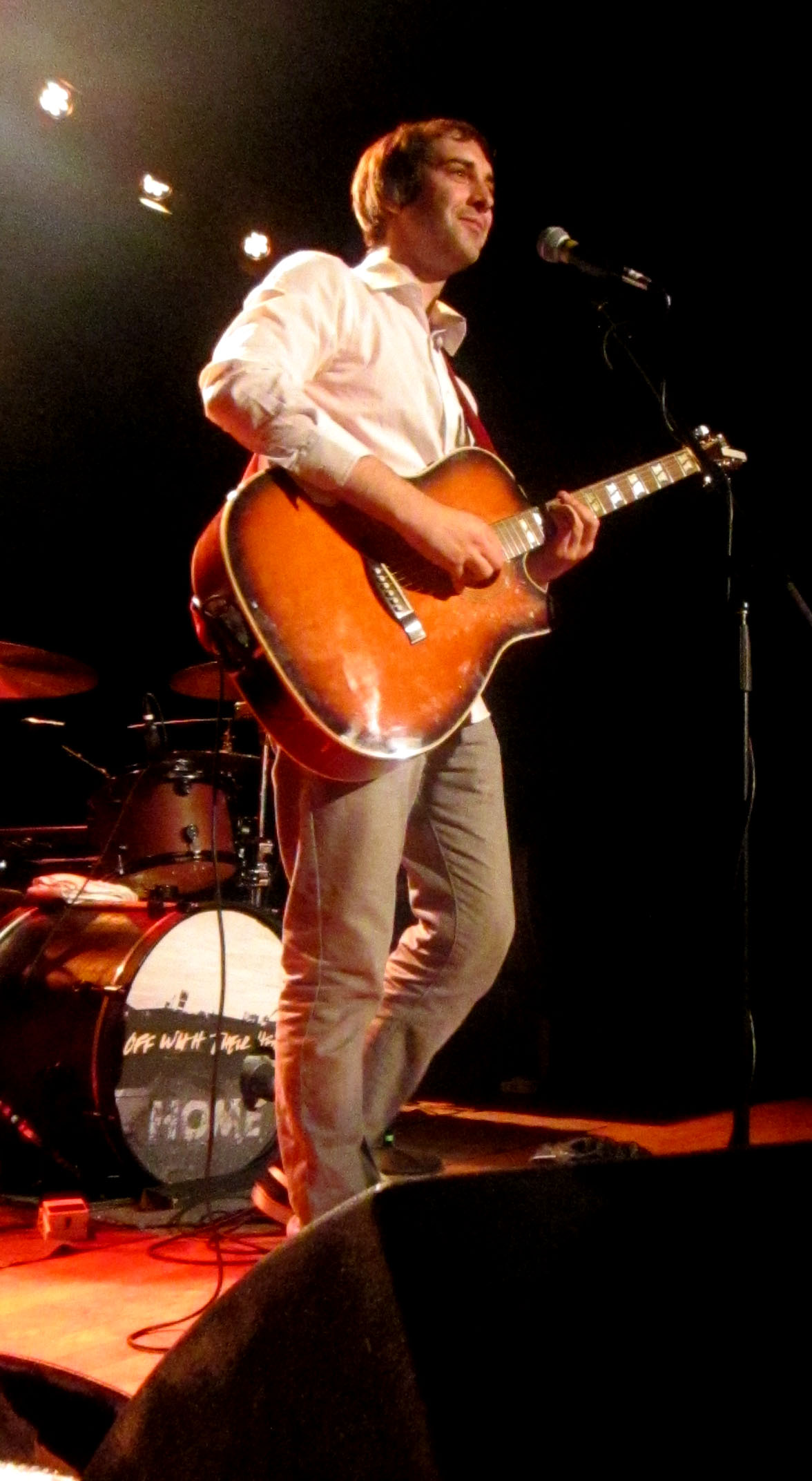

Background information
- Origin: Reading, Berkshire, England
- Genres: Folk, folk punk
- Occupation: Guitarist/singer-songwriter
- Instruments: Guitar, vocals
- Years active: 2002-present
- Labels: Xtra Mile Recordings, Josaka Music, Broken Tail Records

Ben Marwood is an English singer-songwriter from Reading, Berkshire, England. As part of the contemporary London folk scene, Marwood has performed alongside Frank Turner, Chris T-T and Emily Barker amongst others.

== Musical career ==
Playing solo shows from 2002, in 2008 Marwood released his debut mini-album, This Is Not What You Had Planned to some critical acclaim, followed by a three-way split album entitled Exclamation at Asterisk Hash which also featured friends Oxygen Thief and Jim Lockey. Both were released on Broken Tail Records, a small indie label run by Marwood. The debut album Outside There's A Curse was released on London-based Xtra Mile Recordings on 31 January 2011 to further critical acclaim, with Kerrang! awarding it a score of four out of a possible five Ks and Rocksound awarding an eight out of ten. The album release was supported by two national headline tours alongside Oxygen Thief, and a support slot with Frank Turner in May 2011. All undistributed copies of the album were subsequently destroyed in the arson attack on the Sony DADC warehouse during the 2011 England Riots in August 2011. Marwood is a good friend of Turner's and was part of his extended backing band at the 2012 Summer Olympics opening ceremony, and also appeared in the video for Turner's single Long Live the Queen.

After unreleased material featured on a couple of compilation appearances towards the end of 2011, BBC News reported that Marwood was working on a second album. It was confirmed in a blog post on 23 December 2012 that the new album would follow in 2013 and was preceded by a five-song EP featuring re-recorded live takes of previous songs entitled Incidents/Accidents, released via Bandcamp on a pay-what-you-like basis.

Following the Bandcamp release, two further digital EPs were released in February 2013 through Josaka Music, Demons and Ben Marwood & Quiet Quiet Band Lay Low, a split with Reading band Quiet Quiet Band which had shortened to Lay Low by the time it reached retailers, after which Rock Sound announced that the new album Back Down would be released on 13 May 2013 through Xtra Mile Recordings. A headline UK tour was subsequently announced which also featured prominent members of the underground UK acoustic scene, as well as a video for the single Under Lock and Key, before heading to the US as opening support for Frank Turner.

Outside of performing, Marwood also hosts a monthly show on a weekly alternative podcast "edit radio".

== Discography ==
=== Albums ===
- Outside There's a Curse (2011)
- Back Down (2013)
- Get Found (2017)

=== EPs ===
- goodPROPAGANDA (2003)
- Give Up.. just once, give up (2005)
- This Is Not What You Had Planned (2008)
- Incidents/Accidents (2012)
- Demons (2013)

=== Split EPs ===
- Ben Marwood vs. Heartwear Process (7" vinyl – 2007)
- Exclamation at Asterisk Hash (w/Oxygen Thief & Jim Lockey and the Solemn Sun – 2009)
- Lay Low (w/Quiet Quiet Band – 2013)

=== Compilation appearances ===
- Four By Four EP – "More Good Propaganda" (2007)
- Four By Four More EP – "Question Marks?" (2008)
- Xtra Mile High Club Vol. 3 – "We Are No Longer Twenty-Five [Mile High Version]" (2011)
- Lamp Light the Fire – "Horatio Dies" (2011)
