= Thrill Collins =

- Origin: Cheltenham, Gloucestershire, England
- Genres: Skiffle, ska, lounge, jazz
- Years active: 2009–present
- Labels: Bunty Haven's Not Quite Recordings; KMF Records & Management
- Members: Robbie Pert - Guitar, Vocals; Andrew Lansley - Double Bass, Vocals; Pete Harper - Cajon, Vocals
- Past members: Tristan Del Cahoona
- Website: Thrill Collins Website

Thrill Collins are a British acoustic trio formed in 2009. The band consists of Robbie Pert on guitar and vocals, Andrew Lansley on double bass/vocals and Peter Harper on cajon/vocals. To date they have released three EPs recorded by producer George Shilling. The band are most noted for their application of the skiffle genre to modern music. Taking inspiration from the DIY ethics of the movement and artists such as Lonnie Donegan and The Quarrymen, the band have sought to replicate the style and humour that is closely associated with the genre. Using the trio set-up of guitar, upright bass the band substituted the traditional washboard percussion for the Peruvian cajon.

== Origins ==
Thrill Collins grew out of a friendship between Pert and Lansley and the band formed when they played their debut gig before rehearsing, stepping in at the last minute to fill an empty slot at a local event. As the band grew in popularity Harper joined the line up ahead of their 2011 European tour enhancing the vocal and rhythmic capabilities of the trio.

== Charity work ==
Thrill Collins do not take any profit from the proceeds of CD/MP3 sales. They have undertaken charity work throughout their career for numerous national organisations such as Oxfam, Cancer Research UK, Sue Ryder, Macmillan, Teenage Cancer Trust, Alzheimer's Society, Winston's Wish and the London 2012 Olympics.

== Notable appearances ==
Thrill Collins have played numerous festivals and tours across the UK, Europe and the US. On their Myspace page the band claim to have been "on tour since 2009" and average between 120 and 150 shows per year. In the past they have enjoyed support slots with artists such as The Wurzels, Zero 7, Chas and Dave, The Subways, Wiley, Bucks Fizz and The Hoosiers and continue to perform regularly throughout Europe.

== Television and radio ==
The band have appeared numerous times on radio and television programming. They have also created a number of episodic and feature length web documentaries on YouTube including "The Soundman's Tale", "The Wrong Way Round", "Jouer Noel", "It's Not A Holiday" and "WAGS". The band have also released a video for "Black or White", a cover of Michael Jackson's hit single.
