= Beezewax =

Norwegian indie rock band

Beezewax is a Norwegian band founded in 1995, in the town of Moss. The band is often categorized as indie rock, power pop and emo and has been compared to bands like Sugar, Buffalo Tom and Hüsker Dü.

The band has worked with musicians and producers like Ken Stringfellow, John Agnello, Pelle Gunnerfeldt, Bent Sæther and Jorge Elbrecht.

The band went on hiatus in 2007, but announced its comeback with a concert at the Primavera Sound Festival

The band has toured Norway, Sweden, Denmark, Germany, Belgium, UK, France, Spain, Japan, Singapore, Malaysia, and the USA.

== Members ==
- Kenneth Ishak – vocals, guitar
- Jan-Erik Hoel – bass
- Thomas Garder Olsen – guitar
- Mattias Krohn-Nielsen - guitar, keyboards
- Chris Goveia Jacobs – drums

== Discography ==
=== Albums ===
- A Dozen Summits – LaNuGo Records, 1997. Reissued by Sellout! Music and Boss Tuneage Recordings in 2010.
- South of Boredom – PopKid Records, Boss Tuneage Records (UK/EU), Painted Sky Disks (Japan), Underhill Records (Spain), 1999.
- Oh Tahoe – Trust Me Records (Norway), Kasual Recordings (Sweden), Houston Party Records (Spain/EU), Painted Sky Disks (Japan), 2002.
- Who to Salute – Warner Music (Scandinavia, Spain), Thistime Records (Japan), Popboomerang Records (Australia), Reveal Records (UK/WW), 2005.
- Music to the life of the late Olivia Mordecai – Division Records, 2006.
- Tomorrow – Sellout! Music (WW excl. Japan), Thistime Records (Japan) 2014
- Peace Jazz – Sellout! Music (Norway), Moorworks (Japan) 2019
