= Chris T-T =

English singer-songwriter

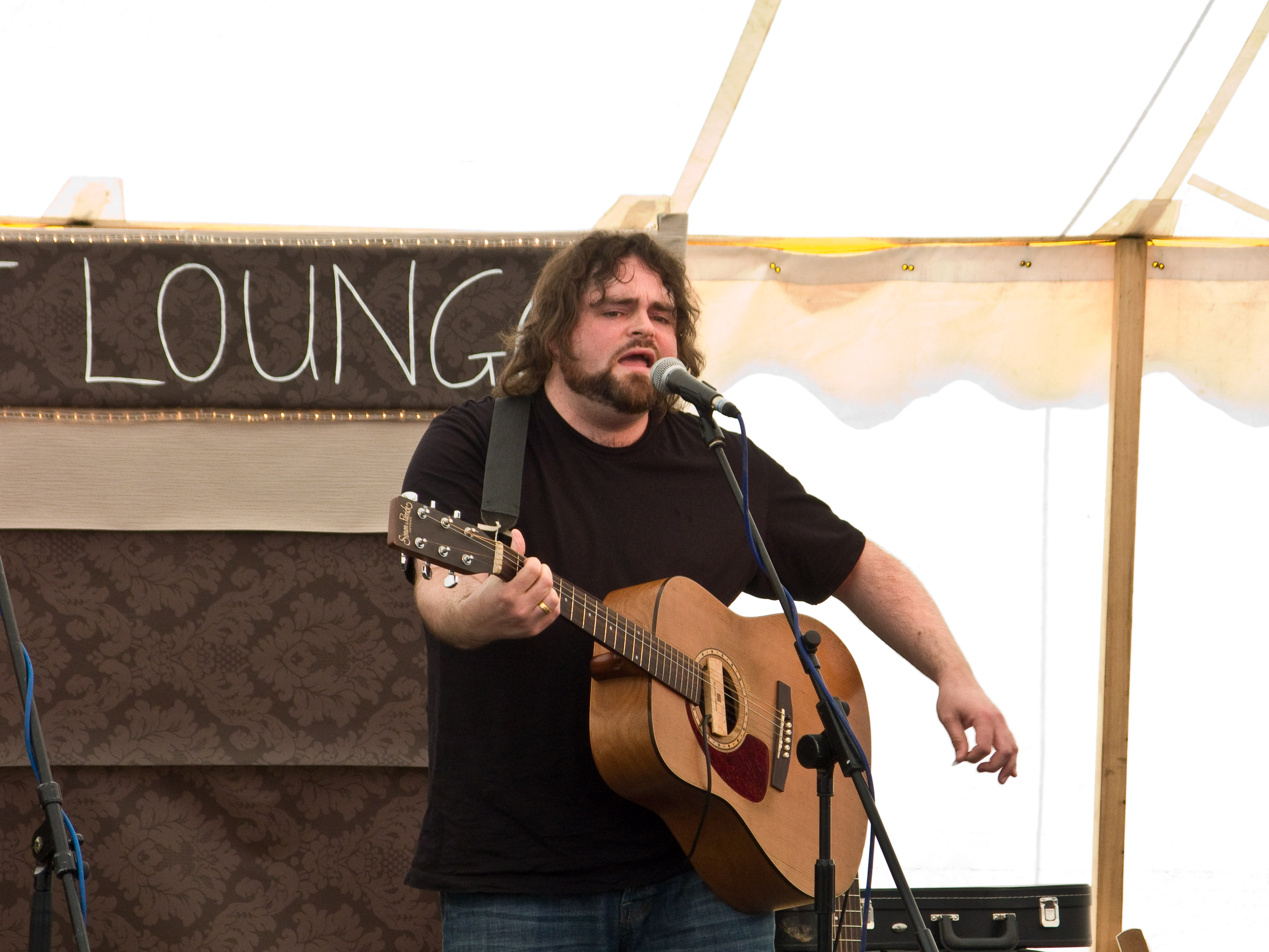
- Chris T-T in the Leaf Lounge at 2000 Trees Festival July 2008

Background information
- Born: Christopher Jon Thorpe-Tracey; 16 September 1974 (age 52); Winchester, England
- Genres: Alternative; folk
- Occupations: Writer; singer-songwriter
- Instruments: Piano; guitar; vocals
- Years active: 1997–2017; 2025
- Labels: Wine Cellar; Snowstorm; Xtra Mile; Lo Fi Arts
- Website: christt.com

Christopher Jon Thorpe-Tracey (born 16 September 1974), known professionally as Chris T-T, is an English retired writer, singer-songwriter and record producer based in Brighton. In a 20-year career he released 10 studio albums, two live collections and a number of collaborations. Thorpe-Tracey is also an author, piano accompanist, activist and radio presenter, and he has written for a range of publications. For several years he contributed a weekly column on the arts to the left-wing newspaper The Morning Star. T-T's final commercial release was Best Of Chris T-T, a career retrospective double-CD released on 19 May 2017 by London-based independent label Xtra Mile Recordings.

While Chris T-T did not achieve mainstream success, his influence as an underground artist is widely felt and his music was consistently praised by critics over two decades.

== Biography ==
=== Early life ===
Christopher Jon Thorpe-Tracey was born and raised in Winchester, England. After performing in school bands, in 1993 he began an honours degree in Popular Music Studies at Bretton Hall College (Leeds University). In 1996, T-T gained his degree and joined Norfolk band Magoo as bass player, as they signed to Chemikal Underground Records. In May 1997, Chris T-T moved to London to work at the Press Association.

In 1999, T-T's debut album Beatverse was released on his own Wine Cellar Records. BBC Radio 1 DJ Steve Lamacq played the song 'Shit From All Angles'. Following Beatverse, T-T signed to London-based independent label Snowstorm Records.

=== 2000–2005 ===
T-T's second album Panic Attack at Sainsbury's was released in autumn 2000. First single 'You Can Be Flirty', was panned in NME but in early 2001 second single, 'Dreaming of Injured Popstars' gained better reviews. In December he performed a live session on Steve Lamacq's Radio 1 Evening Session.

The albums The 253 (2001) and London Is Sinking (2003) followed. Both highly praised, each featured in the Sunday Times Top 5 Albums Of The Year for that year. In autumn 2003 Chris T-T gave up full-time work and moved to Brighton.

In 2005, Snowstorm Records released 9 Red Songs, an album of political folk-protest songs.

=== 2007–2013 ===
In 2007, T-T signed to Xtra Mile Recordings and in 2008 his sixth album Capital was released, preceded by the 'This Gun Is Not A Gun' EP. With larger-scale production than his previous work, it included appearances from Andy Burrows (ex Razorlight drummer), Phil Sumner (British Sea Power cornettist), Jim Bob (Carter USM), Jon Boden (Bellowhead and Spiers & Boden fiddler) and Emmy The Great. Two further singles, 'A-Z' and '(We Are) The King of England' were also released.

T-T recruited a stable band line-up, Hoodrats, including Ben Murray (ex Le Frange) on drums, Johny Lamb (Thirty Pounds of Bone, Lynched Recordings) on bass and long-term collaborator Jen Macro (Graham Coxon, My Bloody Valentine, Robyn Hitchcock) on lead guitar. Through 2008 and 2009 T-T toured Capital in the UK, US and Europe.

In May 2008, T-T joined Frank Turner's touring band on keyboards, also accompanying Turner in a duo format.

In July 2009, T-T performed on the fourth plinth in Trafalgar Square as part of Anthony Gormley's One & Other project.

In March 2010, Xtra Mile Recordings released T-T's seventh album Love Is Not Rescue, accompanied by the single 'Nintendo'. Recorded in Norfolk and Los Angeles, this focused on personal themes. The second UK single 'Words Fail Me' was released on 25 April 2011.

In early 2011 T-T wrote, scripted and composed the score to 'Imagine A Health Worker', a short animated film commissioned by the World Health Organization's Global Health Workforce Alliance. The film opened their world conference in Bangkok and was then made available online.

Through August 2011, T-T performed a one-man show, Disobedience: Chris T-T Sings A.A. Milne, at Edinburgh Fringe Festival. This comprised A.A. Milne's children's poems set to new music composed by T-T on guitar and piano. In October 2011 he self-released a download-only studio album of the songs.

In October 2012, T-T gave a TED talk at TEDxBrighton on the theme 'The Generation Gap'. The talk was made available online.

In January 2013, Chris T-T was the inaugural Artist-In-Residence (Popular Music) at Leeds Metropolitan University.

From March 2013, for six months he was the inaugural Blogger-In-Residence at Brighton's Royal Pavilion.

Chris T-T's ninth album, The Bear, recorded with his band Hoodrats, was released in October 2013. In 2014 Lindsey Scott (ex Le Reno Amps) replaced Johny Lamb as bassist in Hoodrats.

=== 2014–2017 ===
In September 2014, T-T joined Thee Concerned Citizens (Thee Cee Cees) as lead singer. In April 2015 Thee Cee Cees released their debut album Solution Songs on Blang! Records.

In May 2015, T-T released a duo album of covers with folk singer Gill Sandell, Walk Away, Walk Away, on Rowan Tree Records. T-T and Sandell also performed the theme song for horror film The Outer Darkness, produced by BloodyCuts.

In May 2016, T-T released his 10th and final solo album 9 Green Songs on Xtra Mile Recordings, a sequel to his 2005 album 9 Red Songs. Through summer 2016 T-T was the inaugural National Trust Creative Fellow at The Workhouse, Southwell, composing A Ballad For Southwell; a new set of ballads telling stories of workhouse life.

In November 2016 Jim Bob released Jim Bob Sings Again, an album of piano and voice versions of songs from across his catalogue, featuring Chris T-T as piano accompanist.

In March 2017, Xtra Mile Recordings announced Best Of Chris T-T; a double-album career retrospective marking his 20th anniversary, to be released on 19 May.

=== Giving up music ===
In April 2017, Chris T-T announced he was giving up his music career and that a farewell gig in London in autumn would be his final live concert. His final tour was the previously booked May 2017 solo tour promoting his Best Of double album. Chris T-T performed his final live concerts in London on 2 and 3 December 2017.

In November 2025, Chris T-T performed a one-off London headline concert at the 100 Club, to promote vinyl reissues of earlier albums London Is Sinking and 9 Red Songs.

== Other work ==
=== DJ work ===
From October 2014 to June 2018, T-T presented a weekly two-hour folk-oriented radio programme on Juice 107.2 called Midnight Campfire, which lasted until the closure of the radio station. In 2006 and 2007, he presented a weekly live radio programme on Phoenix FM which gave first live sessions to artists including Tom Williams & The Boat and Emmy The Great.

T-T has been club DJ at live concerts by bands including Dinosaur Jr, The Thermals, Okkervil River, Jolie Holland & Samantha Parton and Efterklang.

=== Writing ===
In 2008, Chris T-T started a regular column in the Arts section of The Morning Star which ran for four years. He has written articles and short fiction for The Quietus, Dark Mountain, Louder Than War, ecnmy.org, Huffington Post, NME and others. His Empties photo series was published in the book Dark Mountain Volume 2 and his short story Five Dead Badgers in Dark Mountain Volume 3.

=== #IAmSpartacus ===
In November 2010, Chris T-T was identified as the instigator of the #IAmSpartacus Twitter hashtag, an act of mass online civil disobedience to show support for accountant Paul Chambers, after he lost his appeal against a conviction for a joke he had made on Twitter, earlier in the year. Thousands of people copied Chambers' original message with the #IAmSpartacus hashtag and for a day it was the most popular Twitter hashtag in the world, attracting worldwide media coverage to the case.

The tweet, including the 'Spartacus' reference, was repeated on the floor of the House of Commons by Liberal Democrat MP Julian Huppert.

== Discography ==
=== Albums ===
- Best Of Chris T-T (19 May 2017, career retrospective double album Xtra Mile Recordings)
- 9 Green Songs (3 June 2016, Xtra Mile Recordings)
- Solution Songs (5 May 2015, as lead singer of Thee Cee Cees, Blang!)
- Walk Away, Walk Away (23 March 2015, as Gill Sandell & Chris T-T, Rowan Tree Records)
- The Bear (7 October 2013, as Chris T-T & The Hoodrats, Xtra Mile Recordings)
- Disobedience: Chris T-T Sings A.A. Milne (28 October 2011, Lo Fi Arts)
- Love Is Not Rescue (15 March 2010, Xtra Mile Recordings)
- Capital (17 March 2008, Xtra Mile Recordings)
- 9 Red Songs (October 2005, Snowstorm Records)
- London Is Sinking (October 2003, Snowstorm Records)
- The 253 (November 2001, Snowstorm Records)
- Panic Attack at Sainsbury's (September 2000, Snowstorm Records)
- Beatverse (1999, Wine Cellar Records)

=== Live albums ===
- Live at Trowbridge Town Hall (live concert recording, April 2017, released 2020)
- 9 Red Songs 10th Anniversary Night (live concert recording, February 2016, Lo Fi Arts)
- Good Songs in Small Rooms: Live 2005–2011 (live collection, February 2013, Lo Fi Arts)
- Live Tonight (live collection, June 2004, Wine Cellar Records)

=== EPs ===
- Love Me I'm A Liberal (October 2016, Xtra Mile Recordings, download ep)
- A Beaten Drum EP (June 2014, Xtra Mile Recordings, download ep)
- Words Fail Me (April 2011, Xtra Mile Recordings, download ep)
- Nintendo EP (March 2010, Xtra Mile Recordings, iTunes Exclusive download ep)
- This Gun Is Not A Gun (November 2007, Xtra Mile Recordings, CDep)
- 500 Miles EP (March 2002, Snowstorm Records, CDep)
- You Can Be Flirty (September 2000, Snowstorm Records, CDep)

=== Singles ===
- "A Hole Full Of Submarines (band version)" (April 2017, Xtra Mile Recordings, digital download)
- "The English Earth" (February 2017, Xtra Mile Recordings, digital download)
- "#WorstGovernmentEver" (June 2016, Xtra Mile Recordings, digital download)
- "Bury Me with a Scarab" (10 February 2014, Xtra Mile Recordings, digital download)
- "The Bear" (October 2013, Xtra Mile Recordings, 7"/digital download)
- "Binker" (February 2012, Lo Fi Arts, digital download)
- "Nintendo" (March 2010, Xtra Mile Recordings, digital download)
- "We Are The King of England" (27 October 2008, Xtra Mile Recordings, digital download)
- "A-Z" (10 March 2008, Xtra Mile Recordings, digital download)
- "You Can't Stop The Machine"/"Bored of the War" (May 2004, Isota Records, 7")
- "Eminem Is Gay"/"The Headcold Bit of the Winter" (March 2003, Snowstorm Records, 7"/CD)
- "English Man" (March 2001, Snowstorm Records, 7")
- "Dreaming of Injured Popstars" (March 2001, Snowstorm Records, 7")
- "You Can Be Flirty"/"Sideshow Mel" (September 2000, Snowstorm Records, 7")

=== Split singles ===
- "The Bear" (October 2013, Xtra Mile Recordings, split single with To Kill A King)
- "Tomorrow Morning" (September 2004, R*E*P*E*A*T Records, split single with Cosy Cosy)
- "Cull" (August 2004, Wrath Records, split single with stuffy/the fuses)
- "The Idris Lung/Strings" (May 1997, under the moniker Duckyfuzz, split single with Faded)
