= Xtra Mile Recordings =

British independent record label

- Founded: 2003
- Founder: Charlie Caplowe
- Distributor(s): ADA, Proper Music Distribution
- Genre: Rock music
- Country of origin: United Kingdom
- Location: London
- Official website: XtraMileRecordings.com

Xtra Mile Recordings are a British independent record label based in London, England. The label was founded in 2003 by Charlie Caplowe and they release an eclectic mix of genres with a focus on rock and folk.

== History ==
The label first signed the artists Million Dead and Reuben in 2003 and subsequently released Frank Turner's solo albums after the split of Million Dead in 2005. While signed with Xtra Mile, Frank Turner has gone on to perform at the opening ceremony of the London 2012 Olympics and sell out Wembley Arena.

On 8 August 2011 Xtra Mile were badly affected by the 2011 England riots, when the Sony Music warehouse that stored their records was set on fire.

Since the label's inception it has continued to support and break new artists and bands. Xtra Mile has released numerous charting albums from acts including Skinny Lister and Will Varley. In recent years the label has announced distribution deals outside the UK in countries such as the US & Canada.

On 4 July 2017, Xtra Mile were featured on BBC Radio 1's Independents' Day Takeover hosted by Huw Stevens.

== Artists ==
=== Current ===
List of artists on Xtra Mile Recordings:

- Against Me!
- Algiers
- Beans on Toast
- Ben Marwood
- BERRIES
- Billy Pettinger
- Cheap Girls
- Chris T-T
- Counterfeit
- Deux Furieuses
- Dive Dive
- Frank Turner
- Glossary
- God Fires Man
- Half Noise
- Jonah Matranga
- Joshua English
- Lights.Action!
- The Maybes?
- Möngöl Hörde
- Northcote
- Oxygen Thief
- Pet Needs
- Recreations
- Rob Lynch
- A Silent Film
- Saint Leonard's Horses
- Skinny Lister
- Stapleton
- Straight Lines (formerly Said Mike)
- Sucioperro
- To Kill A King
- The Xcerts

=== Alumni ===
List of artists no longer with Xtra Mile Recordings:

- DARTZ!
- Future Of The Left
- Million Dead
- My Luminaries
- My Vitriol
- Reuben
- The Rifles
- Sonic Boom Six
- This Et Al
- Will Varley

== See also ==
- List of record labels
