= The Xcerts =

British alternative rock band

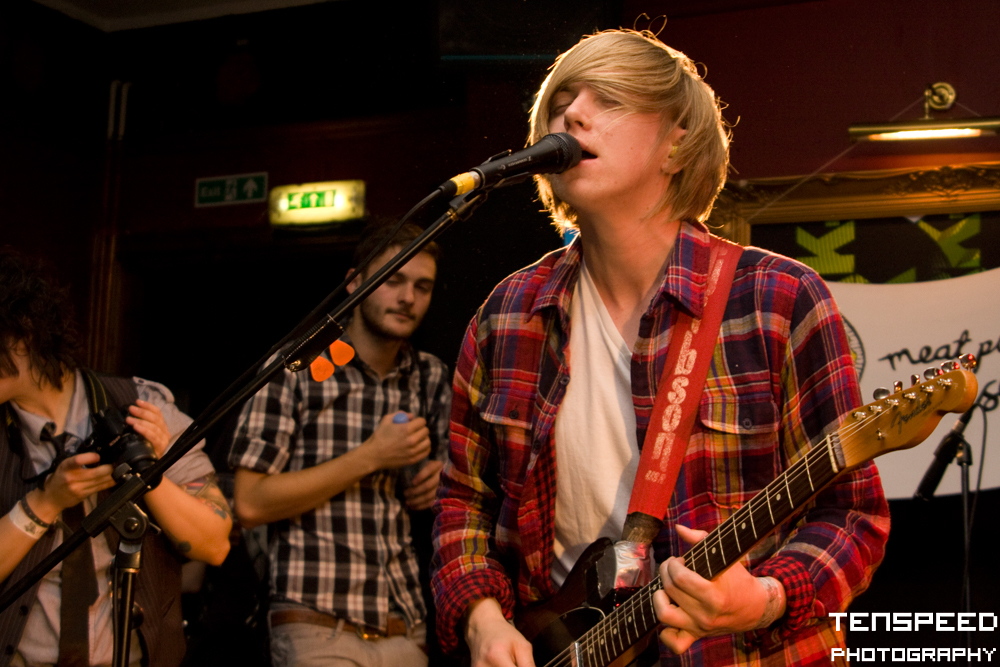
- The Xcerts in 2009

Background information
- Origin: Aberdeen, Scotland, UK
- Genres: Alternative rock, indie rock, power pop, post-hardcore (early)
- Years active: 2001–present
- Label: UNFD Raygun Music
- Members: Murray Macleod; Jordan Smith; Tom Heron
- Past members: Ross McTaggart
- Website: www.thexcertsband.com

The Xcerts (stylised as The XCERTS) are a Scottish alternative rock band, originally formed in Aberdeen, Scotland in 2001. They have released six studio albums, with their latest being i think i want to go home now. on July 10, 2026.

== Biography ==
The Xcerts were originally formed by 13-year-olds Murray Macleod and Jordan Smith after meeting in the headmasters room at Robert Gordon's College in Aberdeen. When school friend Ross McTaggart joined on drums, The Xcerts went on to record two EPs at the local recording studio Captain Tom's.

In order to progress, the band moved to Brighton, England in 2006, where Macleod went to college with future Architects vocalist, Sam Carter, and would later become roommates with Architects bassist Alex Dean.

Shortly afterwards, The Xcerts parted ways with their old drummer McTaggart. A replacement was found in Tom Heron, originally from Exeter, who was living in Brighton with a mutual friend and had also become close friends with Murray and Jordan. With the newly formed trio created, the band began writing the songs that would start to spread the word of The Xcerts nationally.

The Xcerts then went on to release two singles through One Records in Glasgow. Breathtaking Fight, which was recorded at Ridge Farm with Ben Watkins, was then followed shortly after by My Book Laughs. After the success of these two singles, the band were headhunted by Get Cape. Wear Cape. Fly frontman, Sam Duckworth, via MySpace who subsequently released two further singles – Just Go Home and Do You Feel Safe? – through his label, Mannequin Republic.

Recorded at The Dog House by Adam Whittaker, Just Go Home received regular airplay on MTV2, and the band recorded three acoustic tracks for MTV's Spanking New Sessions series. The band have also recorded sessions for Tiscali, BBC Radio 1, BBC Radio Scotland, XFM Scotland and XFM London. Cover versions of Radiohead's "All I Need" and The Pixies' "Gigantic" featured in the XFM Scotland and XFM London sessions respectively.

'Do You Feel Safe?' was recorded with Dave Eringa (Idlewild, Manic Street Preachers) and released in early 2008.

The Xcerts have toured with Get Cape. Wear Cape. Fly, Make Model, Fighting with Wire, Fightstar and Twin Atlantic, and performed at numerous festivals in 2008 including T in the Park, RockNess, Belladrum Tartan Heart Festival, Zoo8, Offset and Connect Music Festival.

On 22 January 2009, The Xcerts confirmed that their album, In The Cold Wind We Smile would be released on 23 March 2009 through Xtra Mile (Reuben, Million Dead, Frank Turner) and King Tuts Recordings (The Dykeenies, Twin Atlantic). This date was however pushed back to the 30th. They also confirmed that they would release the single "Crisis In The Slow Lane" on 9 March at the end of their tour with Copy Haho.

The Xcerts debut album, In The Cold Wind We Smile, was released on 30 March 2009 through Xtra Mile. It was produced by Dave Eringa. On 1 August 2009 they played at the inaugural Hevy Music Festival held in Folkestone, UK.

In 2010 they completed another headline tour, supported The Get Up Kids and played many festivals notably playing the main stage at Rockness. They will also be embarking on a tour With Get Cape Wear Cape Fly, as well as a September tour supporting Futures.

The Xcerts announced on their Facebook and Myspace in July 2010 that their new album would be named Scatterbrain and released in October. This album was recorded by Mike Sapone in his home studio in America, The Xcerts are the first Scottish Band to work with Sapone.

The second single from Scatterbrain was "Young (Belane)" starring actor Jamie Campbell Bower as an obsessed fan who kidnaps the band. Jamie has acted in such films as The Demon Barber of Fleet Street, Harry Potter and the Deathly Hallows – Part 1 and The Twilight Saga: New Moon.

In 2012, The Xcerts toured extensively supporting Brand New, Manchester Orchestra and Taking Back Sunday on their UK tours. They were also due to open for Guns N' Roses at the Glasgow, Birmingham and London dates of The Up Close and Personal Tour. However, due to "logistical reasons" all the opening support bands, including The Xcerts, were forced to drop off of the tour. The Xcerts would go on to open for Cursive and Kevin Devine instead.

In 2014, vocalist Macleod appeared on the track "Youth Is Wasted On The Young", from the album Lost Forever // Lost Together by Brighton metalcore band Architects. He has also appeared live on stage with the band to sing his segment of the song during UK shows.

The Xcerts' third album There Is Only You was released on 3 November 2014, through Raygun Music. It was produced by Dave Eringa, with additional orchestration by long-term friend and producer Paul Steel. Within its first week of release, it reached number 96 in the UK Album Chart and number 8 in the Rock Album Chart.

In 2017, The Xcerts appeared at a number of festivals, 2000 Trees (Cheltenham), Reading, 2Q (Lincoln) and Neighbourhood (Manchester) included.

The band released the songs "Feels Like Falling in Love", "Hold On To Your Heart" and "Daydream" in 2017 and "Drive Me Wild" in January 2018, all taken from their fourth studio album Hold On To Your Heart, which was released on 19 January 2018.

To support the release of Hold On To Your Heart, a short run of intimate instore shows were announced across Scotland and in Kington, London for January 2018. These shows were in a break in the Nothing But Thieves European tour, for which The Xcerts were the main support (with Airways as the opener). Shortly after this, they embarked on their 12 date UK and Ireland tour, also with Airways as support) across February and March 2018. The Cardiff show was later postponed to April due to severe weather.

In late April and May, the band set out on their first European headline tour. They also appeared at Live at Leeds, 2000 Trees and Reading festivals in the summer.

On 15 January 2021, the band released their covers EP So No One Told You Life Was Gonna Be This Way. Their album I think i want to go home now. is scheduled to release on July 10, 2026.

== Cover art ==
One of the recurring theme within The Xcerts is each band member featuring on the front of the artwork for each album they have released. Drummer, Tom Heron is on the cover of 2009's In The Cold Wind We Smile, Scatterbrain features bassist Jordan Smith on the cover and Murray Macleod appears on the cover of their third album There Is Only You. All three members feature on the cover of their fourth album, Hold On To Your Heart. "Kick It" taken from the album There Is Only You is played at halftime during home matches for the band's hometown football team, Aberdeen FC.

== Band members ==
Current

- Murray Macleod – guitar, lead vocals (2001–present)
- Jordan Smith– bass, piano, backing vocals, T-shirt printing (2001–present)
- Tom Heron – drums (2006–present)

Former

- Ross McTaggart – drums (2001–2006)

== Discography ==
=== Studio albums ===
- In the Cold Wind We Smile (2009)
- Scatterbrain (2010)
- There Is Only You (2014)
- Hold On to Your Heart (2018)
- Learning How to Live and Let Go (2023)
- Afterthoughts On Letting Go (2024)
- i think i want to go home now. (2026)

=== Live albums ===
- Live at King Tut's (2009)

=== EPs ===
- One Time Too Many (2001)
- The X-certs EP (2003)
- Stairs to Noise (2011)
- Live Like This (2014)
- I Don't Care (2015)
- Late One Night (2018)
- Wildheart Dreaming (2019)
- So No One Told You Life Was Gonna Be This Way (2021)
- Afterthoughts On Letting Go (2024)

=== Singles ===
List of singles, with selected details
Name	Label	B-side(s)	Release date	Album
"Breathtaking Fight"	One Records	"Stay the Same"	18 December 2006	Non-album singles
"My Book Laughs"	One Records	"Weather Warning"	30 April 2007	Non-album singles
"Just Go Home"	Mannequin Republic	"Aberdeen 1987"	19 November 2007	In the Cold Wind We Smile
"Do You Feel Safe?"	Mannequin Republic	"Listen, Don't Panic"	14 April 2008	In the Cold Wind We Smile
"Crisis in the Slow Lane"	Xtra Mile/King Tuts Recordings	"Weather Warning"	9 March 2009	In the Cold Wind We Smile
"Slackerpop"	Xtra Mile Recordings	N/A	7 June 2010	Scatterbrain
"Young (Belane)"	Xtra Mile Recordings	"I Am Home"	27 September 2010	Scatterbrain
"Shaking in the Water"	Raygun Music	N/A	21 July 2014	There Is Only You
"Pop Song"	Raygun Music	N/A	7 October 2014	There Is Only You
"Feels Like Falling in Love"	Raygun Music	N/A	2 July 2017	Hold On to Your Heart
"Daydream"	Raygun Music	N/A	28 September 2017	Hold On to Your Heart
"Hold On to Your Heart"	Raygun Music	N/A	1 December 2017	Hold On to Your Heart
"Drive Me Wild"	Raygun Music	N/A	12 January 2018	Hold On to Your Heart

=== Other appearances ===
- "I Hate the Way You Dance" – features on Fat Hippy Sampler Vol I, released 17/10/05
- "Weather Warning" – features on Fat Hippy Sampler Vol II, released 04/12/06
- "Do You Feel Safe?" – features on Fat Hippy Sampler Vol III, released 29/09/08
- "I See Things Differently" – features on Cider Smiles Vol III (Hide and Seek Records) released 01/07/10
- "Youth Is Wasted on the Young" - features on Lost Forever // Lost Together, released on 11/03/2014
- "Helena" (My Chemical Romance cover) - features on Kerrang! Ultimate Rock Heroes!, released 02/06/15
- "When I Come Around" (Green Day Cover) - features on Kerrang! Green Day 30th Anniversary, released 04/12/2016
- "Ruin My Life" - features on As It Is, to be released 17/07/26
