= List of noise rock bands =

This is a list of notable noise rock bands.

== 0–9 ==
- '68

== A ==
- AIDS Wolf
- An Albatross
- Arab on Radar

== B ==
- Babes in Toyland
- Barkmarket
- Big Black
- The Birthday Party
- Blacklisters
- Black Midi
- Blind Idiot God
- Blonde Redhead
- The Body
- Boredoms
- Boris
- Brainbombs
- Brainiac
- The Butthole Surfers

== C ==
- Carsick Cars
- Cattle
- Chat Pile
- Cherubs
- The Chinese Stars
- Cows
- Crunt

== D ==
- Daisy Chainsaw
- Daughters
- Dazzling Killmen
- Death from Above 1979
- Deerhoof
- Deerhunter
- Dinosaur Jr.
- Distorted Pony
- Dope Body
- Drive Like Jehu
- Drunk Tank
- DZ Deathrays

== E ==
- Ed Hall

== F ==
- Feedtime
- Flipper
- Foot Village
- Fudge Tunnel

== G ==
- Gilla Band
- Girls Against Boys
- God Bullies
- godheadSilo
- Gore
- Grong Grong
- Glenn Branca
- Guerilla Toss

== H ==
- Half Japanese
- Halo of Flies
- Health
- Hella
- Helmet
- Her New Knife
- High Rise

== I ==
- Irk
- Itchy-O

== J ==
- The Jesus Lizard
- Jucifer

== K ==
- KEN Mode
- Killdozer
- Kinski

== L ==
- Les Rallizes Denudes
- Les Savy Fav
- Live Skull
- Lightning Bolt
- The Locust
- Lou Reed
- Lubricated Goat

== M ==
- Magik Markers
- Mandy, Indiana
- mclusky
- Melt-Banana
- Melkbelly
- Melvins
- The Membranes
- METZ
- Thurston Moore
- Michael Gira
- Model/Actriz

== N ==
- Neptune
- Nightstick
- Nirvana

== O ==
- Oxbow

== P ==
- Pain Teens
- Part Chimp
- Polvo
- Pussy Galore
- Pixies
- Prostitute

== Q ==
- Queenadreena

== R ==
- Red Krayola
- Replicator
- Royal Trux
- Ruins
- Rapeman

== S ==
- Scratch Acid
- Season to Risk
- Shellac
- Shorty
- Show Me the Body
- Six Finger Satellite
- Sonic Youth
- Sprain
- Steel Pole Bath Tub
- Steve Albini
- The Stooges
- Stretchheads
- Swans

== T ==
- Tad
- Tar
- Thinking Fellers Union Local 282
- Totimoshi
- Tropical Fuck Storm
- Today Is the Day

== U ==
- U.S. Maple
- Uboa
- Unsane
- Unwound
- Uzi
- The U-Men

== V ==
- The Velvet Underground

== W ==
- White Hills
- White Zombie
- Whores
- Will Haven

== Z ==
- Zs
- Zeni Geva
