= Chunk (collective) =

Musical collective and arts space in Leeds

- Chunk's Meanwood Road premises
- Interactive map of Chunk
- Address: 275 Meanwood Road, Leeds, UK
- Coordinates: 53°48′57″N 1°32′48″W
- Capacity: 50
- Events: Noise rock; hardcore punk; electronic; math rock; post-punk; noise

Construction
- Opened: 2013
- Closed: 2020

Chunk (stylised in all caps) was an English musical collective and worker cooperative arts space in Leeds. Its premises housed a music venue, studios for rehearsing, recording and screen printing, as well as a darkroom, hosted music lessons and was home to the record label Voice of Chunk. It encompassed a wide variety of experimental musical styles such as grindcore, math rock, sludge metal, noise music and hip-hop. The collective fostered a crossover of heavy rock styles like noise rock and hardcore punk with electronic music and dance music, which helped to establish the 2010s post-punk revival and push the boundaries of electronic music. It was a countercultural and left wing political hub for Leeds and widely influential across the city and Northern England.

Following the closure of prominent Leeds venues such as Royal Park Cellars, Josephs Well and the Cockpit, members of bands including Bearfoot Beware and Cattle founded Chunk as a rehearsal space and occasional venue in 2013. Its original location was Shannon Street. In 2015, it moved to 275 Meanwood Road, where it would remain until its dissolution in 2020. At its Meanwood location, the collective widened to include DJs and clubnights such as Slut Drop and Come Thru. Chunk closed temporarily during the COVID-19 lockdown in the United Kingdom; however the collective were no longer able to pay its rent, leading to its closure.

== Characteristics ==
Journalists have variously described Chunk as a collective, art space, rehearsal studio, recording studio and music venue. It also housed a darkroom, screen printing room, the record label Voice of Chunk and music lessons. God is in the TV called it "more a collection of rehearsal and storage spaces for musicians than a venue". In 2016, Vice Media called it a movement.

The space was run as a non-profit worker cooperative run horizontally. Each band paid rent, while people not in the collective could use the space temporarily. All events were organised by the members of the collective or their friends, with non-collective members who booked including Hookworms, Trust Fund and Joanna Gruesome. The venue and collective were gender inclusive. Bands would often also perform at the Brudenell Social Club, Packhorse and Wharf Chambers.

The Chuck collective included acts who played a variety of styles including post-punk bands, punk rock bands, noise rock bands like Two Trick Horse, math rock bands like ZoZo, hardcore punk bands the Afternoon Gentlemen, Lugubrious Children and Famine, noise music and improvisation performers such as Territorial Gobbing and electronic music like Slut Drop. Its musical diversity encouraged the community to be more experimental. Thank vocalist Freddy Vinehill-Cliffe described the collective's sound "There was a really diverse selection of bands but also the music they were making, it was a really fertile scene where it felt like there were no real boundaries: there was kind of the general thing that it was like noisy guitar, but we’re taking that in all kinds of different directions". Bearfoot Beware credited their 2018 change in sound to the bands surrounding them at Chunk. Drowned in Sound said it was mostly known for "loud, in your face rock", while the Guardian named it as hosting "Leeds' next generation of leftfield heroes", naming Hookworms and Bearfoot Beware as examples and Clash said it "exist[ed] to propagate provocative music to the weirdos of music scenes".

== History ==
=== 2013–2015: Founding on Shannon Street ===
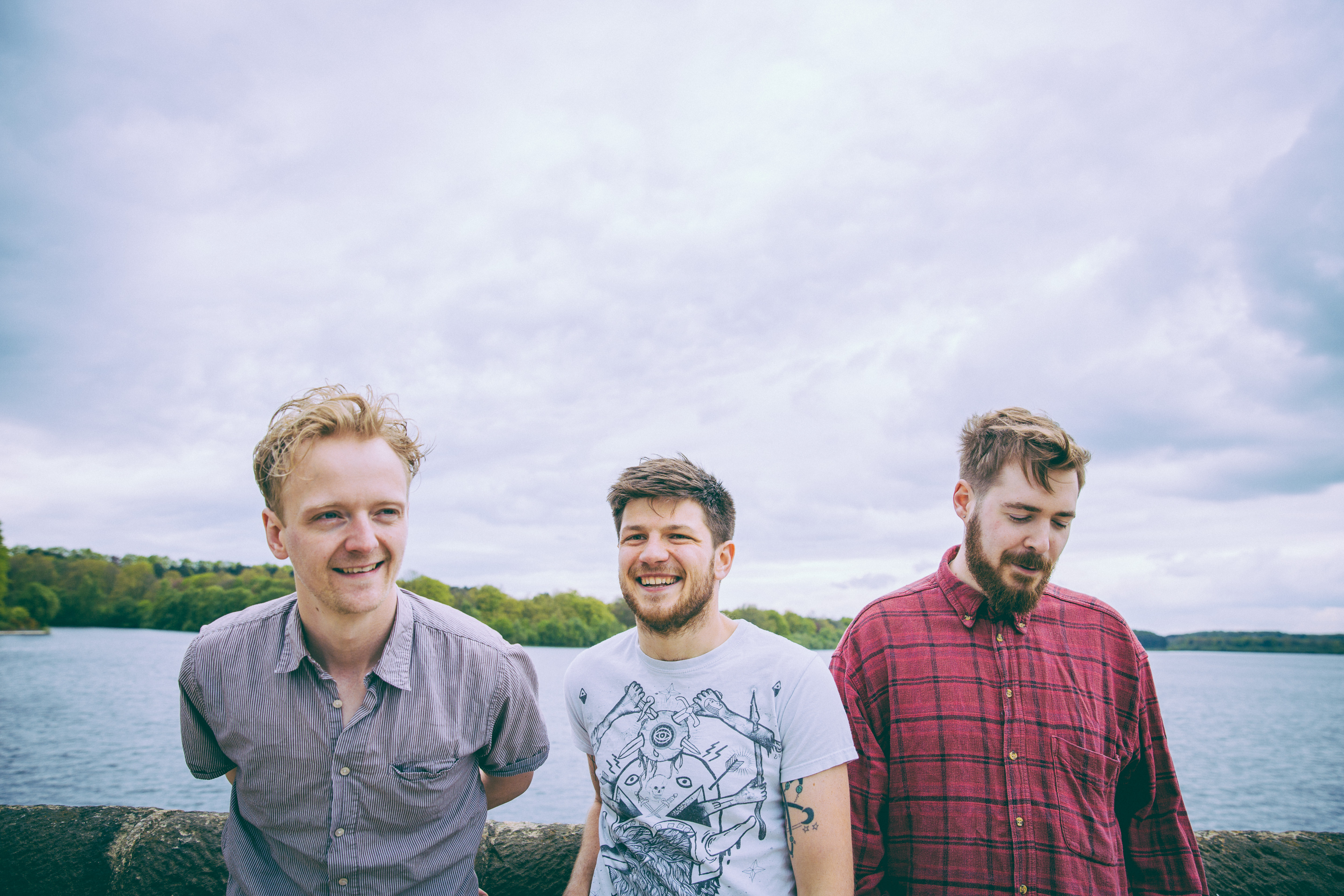
Bearfoot Beware were amongst the founding Chunk bands

Steve Myles, drummer for Cattle, had been manager of Royal Park Cellars, a venue which was a part of Royal Park Pub and central to earlier iterations of the Leeds music scene. When the pub brought in new management in 2013, all performances were cancelled and Myles was let go from his job. Around the same time other prominent venues in the city closed, such as Josephs Well and the Cockpit, as well as institutions End of British Wildlife Festival and Brew Records. Myles helped to found Chunk, explaining it as due to how other units had high rates for rehearsal and storage, stating "Seeing as everyone was aiming to jam more than once a week, all the ferrying about with gear was getting daft" Another founder, Tom Bradley, of Bearfoot Beware, had previously lived in Manchester, but was disillusioned by the prominence of pay-to-play shows and lack of DIY community in the city and saw opening a space in Leeds as an escape.

Chunk was founded in 2013, with its original premises being on Shannon Street, which lasted only one year. This space was a warehouse with only two rooms, with a third being built by the collective, only allowed to rehearse after 5pm due to its upstairs space being used by another business. It was inspired by the "more collaborative way of making music" of earlier Leeds bands Blacklisters and Pulled Apart by Horses, and absorbed many musicians in the sludge metal, math rock and grindcore scenes in the city, which Royal Park Cellars had been central to. In 2014, they started the record label Voice of Chunk to release Irk's EP Bread and Honey, then releasing Bearfoot Beware's album World Owes You Nowt (2015).

=== 2015–2020: Relocation to Meanwood Road ===
Lady Leshurr performed at Chunk in 2015

In 2015, Chunk relocated to Independent House, at 275 Meanwood Road. As the space was derelict, the landlord gave the bands a reduced rental rate in order to develop it. To raise money for repairs, the collective organised a series of all-day fundraisers at the Brudenell Social Club. The space was purpose built and had six rooms and a 50-person capacity. The collective sometimes called the space "Chunk 2", with its founders being Beige Palace, Cattle, Esper Scout and Bearfoot Beware.

Around 2015, it had absord the DJ collective Slut Drop, who began to host their nights at the venue. Around the same time, Freddie Vinehill-Cliffe of Beige Palace and Fred M-G of ZoZo organised the live music night House Full of Garbage, a "weird night" focused on punk and dance fusions which saw Ideal and the South Yorkshire Mick Hucknall. Bands also began to be formed internally amongst the collective's members, with members of Super Luxury and Cattle forming Clentsch, while members of Get Machine Destroy and Bearfoot Beware formed New Woman. Come Thru also began holding a club night in the venue, which saw performances by Lady Leshurr and Dälek. By 2016, it had 40 members, including Beige Palace, Thank, Irk, Zozo, Unwave, Cowtown, Bronzed, Esper Scout, Bearfoot Beware, Super Luxury, Cattle, Clentsch, Oil, Groak, Famine, Ona Snop, Hex, the Girlsweat Pleasure Temple Ritual Band, Hamer and Black Gorgon, with its most prominent acts being Cattle, Irk and Slut Drop.

Around this time, it began to attract a wider audience. Writing for Vice Media, Marcus Clarke credited the collective's popularity to the high density of university students living in nearby Hyde Park, whose houses had basements. Time Out called it the "go-to for many of those escaping austerity". Kerrang writer Kiran Acharya stated it build "the kind of environment where bands can coalesce and disperse for the weirdest of reasons", citing Thank and Virgin Dad as examples. It became a part of a wave of similar collectives across the UK that also included Nottingham's JT Soar and Sheffield's Delicious Clam and the Audacious Art Experiment.

Chunk hosted the 2016 pre-show for Strangeforms festival, hosting Cattle, Falls and Monster Killed By Laser. On 19 May 2016, ZoZo released a music video for the single "International Waters", filmed at Chunk. On 22 July 2016, they held a fundraiser for both Chunk and Partisan Collective. On 16 September 2016, Chest Pains, Thee MVPs and New Woman performed at the venue. On 16 December 2016, Cattle performed the launch show for their album Nature's Champion at Chunk. On 21 January 2017, a fundraiser for the venue, the Shape of Chunk to Come, was held at the Brudenell Social Club. On 25 July 2017, Cat Apostrophe and Breakfast Muff performed at the venue. Hoof Glove recorded their 2018 self-titled album at Chunk.

Chunk closed temporarily during the COVID-19 lockdown in the United Kingdom; however with no money coming in, the collective were no longer able to pay its rent. By September 2020, they was looking for a new venue. Some of its members went on to found Damaged Goods, which operates under similar principles. Some of its members also gravitated towards Magbate Bleach.

== Legacy ==
The early bands of the members of Yard Act would frequently play Chunk

Gavin Butt, author of No Machos and Pop Stars, described it as one of the points of "impetus" for the 2010s post-punk revival. The work of Slut Drop helped to push boundaries in electronic music. By 2015, Leeds List had observed that "There’s a growing influence emanating from the self-styled musical collective that’s gradually beginning to bear fruit". In 2016 Vice "the place that epitomises your insatiable lust for boundless creative noise... producing some of the most interesting and prolific bands in the scene right now". Moshville Times named it as one element of what "Leeds has become famous for in recent years and has been at the heart of the city's musical revival". the Skinny said "Every city needs something like Chunk" and later as "everyone’s new favourite" space. In 2017, the Line of Best Fit called Chunk "a bastion of all things weird, wonderful and uncouth in Leeds for time immemorial".

In 2018, Clash said it "helped increase the city's pulse rate, with the DIY art space / rehearsal room / venue growing from minute origins to become a real powerhouse for the surrounding area". In 2019 V13 said "The power of the current [Leeds] scene can very much be, at least, partially attributed to" Chunk. In 2019, Mixmag stated "Without places like Wharf Chambers and Chunk, it’s hard to imagine so many of Leeds’ ground-breaking, creative parties existing". James T. McKay of the Cosmic Dead and Acid Cannibals stated "Chunk are a community centre which hold an incredible amount of influence in that special strip of England we could refer to as ‘the South of the North’ and it's incredibly inspiring to see how they operate" AllMusic writer Rich Wilson described releases from the collective as an "integral part of the Leeds D.I.Y. scene". Scenemusicmedia called it "notorious".

The running of the cooperative has been cited as an influence by Living Body, WIHT and Fuzz Lightyear. Yard Act came up playing the venue. Its end was mourned by Louder Than War, Brighton and Hove News, Tinnitist and God is in the TV. In 2019, the Guardian writer Dave Simpson and Alice Nutter of Chumbawamba named Chunk as one the main spaces of Leeds counterculture and far-left politics.

== See also ==
- Music in Leeds
- Windmill scene
