= Cattle (band) =

English rock band

- Origin: Leeds, West Yorkshire, U.K.
- Genres: Noise rock; sludge metal; post-punk
- Years active: 2012–2020
- Label: Hominid Sounds
- Past members: Chris Jacobs; Tom Goodall; Steve Myles; Jambo Simpson; Lewis Millward; Toby Green; Anthony Bedford; Miles Spilsbury

Cattle were an English rock band from Leeds. Formed in 2012, the band originally consisted of Chris Jacobs (vocals), Tom Goodall (bass) and Anthony Bedford (drums), with no guitar player. Following the release of their debut EP Cattle (2013), they hired second drummer Steve Myles, leading to further shaping of their sound around instruments uncommon in rock music, such as theremins and saxophones. They released their debut full-length Nature's Champion in 2016, which was followed by Live at Assembly House, a collaborative live EP with Girl Sweat. Cattle were one of the founders and most prominent acts in the Chunk collective, which grew an experimental music scene in Leeds and helped to establish the 2010s post-punk revival. Cattle disbanded in 2020, as a result of the COVID-19 lockdown in the United Kingdom.

== History ==
Cattle formed in 2012, as a three-piece, consisting of Chris Jacobs (vocals), Tom Goodall (bass) and Anthony Bedford (drums). They released their debut, self-titled EP on 13 February 2013, then became less active as members focused on their other band, Super Luxury. Soon, they hired second drummer Steve Myles, explaining their decision in an interview with the Quietus as being because "we decided that you can be noisy as you like as long as the rhythm is infectious."

They self-recorded their debut album in February 2015. In February 2016, they performed at Strangeforms festival. On 4 July, they announced their debut full-length Nature's Champion would be released on 1 August; however it was not. On 14 December, they released the single "Moon Crawling". It was a part of Nature's Champion, then released on 16 December. A release show for the album took place the same day, with support from Thank, Lugubrious Children, Zozo, Droves, Dadrock and Yuri.

They performed at Supernormal Festival 2017. The set was filmed and released by IMPA TV. In 2018, they revealed they were working on collaborative EPs with Algernon Cornelius and Girl Sweat as well as their second full-length, describing it as "a bit darker". On 11 February 2019, they released Live at Assembly House, a collaborative live EP recorded on 1 July 2017. A launch show for the EP took place at the Brudenell Social Club on the day of release. In March 2019, they opened for Pigs Pigs Pigs Pigs Pigs Pigs Pigs. They performed at Arctangent 2019. On 5 February 2020, they announced Toby Green (of Chiyoda Ku and Pave) had joined as drummer, replacing Simpson.

Cattle disbanded due to complications during the COVID-19 lockdown in the United Kingdom. Myles went on to form Grub Nap and Pleb. He also joined Thank.

== Musical style ==
Critics categorised Cattle's music as sludge metal, post-punk and noise rock. They incorporated elements of grunge, electronic music, jazz music, electronica, noise music, psychedelic rock and funk music.

Cattle did not have a guitar player, with instrumentals being based around bass and two drummers. They used unconventional instruments for rock music, including theremins, woodwinds and saxophones. Their music was groove-centric, incorporating intricate drum patterns and layered rhythms. They often made use of funk grooves, angular riffs, fuzz-effected bass tones and breakdowns. Their sound was theatrical and emotional. Jacobs' vocals were shouted and sometimes screamed. Quiet and Loud noted the elements of Mark E. Smith's vocal delivery in his style. His vocals were often modified using modulation effects. Idioteq called them "frankly bonkers" and the Fire Note described them as Slint mixed with Dope Body.

Cattle cited influences including LCD Soundsystem, Big Business, godheadSilo, Corrupted, Black Sabbath, MC5, Zu, Mars Volta, Brand New, Dälek, Death Grips, Fela Kuti, Wayne Shorter, jazz and new wave music.

== Legacy ==
Alongside Irk, Cattle were a part of a wave of Leeds noise rock bands that built upon the foundation laid by Blacklisters. They were one of the most prominent acts to come from the Chunk collective, and one of its founders. The collective's musical diversity encouraged the community to be more experimental. Gavin Butt, author of No Machos and Pop Stars, described Chunk as one of the points of "impetus" for the 2010s post-punk revival. By 2015, Leeds List had observed that "There’s a growing influence emanating from the self-styled musical collective that’s gradually beginning to bear fruit". In 2017, The Line of Best Fit called Chunk "a bastion of all things weird, wonderful and uncouth in Leeds for time immemorial". Louder than War noted the band as an example of Leeds' "gloriously incestuous" music scene, with Jacobs also playing in Soft Issues and Myles playing in Hoof Glove.

Cattle have been cited as a favourite by the Lovely Eggs, Bearfoot Beware and James Smith of Post-War Glamour Girls and Yard Act. Weirds cited them as one of the reasons they relocated to Leeds.

== Members ==
Final lineup

- Chris Jacobs – vocals, electronics (2012–2020)
- Tom Goodall – bass (2012–2015)
- Steve Myles – drums (2013–2020)
- Jambo Simpson – drums (2015–2020)
- Lewis Millward – electronics (2017–2020)
- Toby Green – drums (2020)

Former

- Anthony Bedford - drums (2012–2015)
- Miles Spilsbury – saxophone (2016–2017)

== Discography ==
Studio albums

- Nature's Champion (2016)

EPs

- Cattle (2013)

Live

- Live at Assembly House (2019; collaboration with Girl Sweat)
