= Black Moth =

British stoner rock/metal band

- Also known as: The Bacchae (2008–2010)
- Origin: Leeds, West Yorkshire, UK
- Genres: Stoner rock; doom metal; grunge; garage punk
- Years active: 2008–2019
- Label: New Heavy Sounds
- Past members: Harriet Bevan; Jim Swainston; Dave Vachon; Dom McCready; Rob the Fox; Nico Carew; Federica Gialanze
- Website: themothpit.co.uk

Black Moth were an English rock band from Leeds.

== History ==
In a 2012 interview, vocalist Harriet Bevan described Black Moth as "an ever-evolving project that eventually developed a purpose". She cited its original form as a band featuring her and guitarist Jim Swainston that the pair formed in high school. The band had bonded over a shared interest in grunge, particularly Nirvana and Alice in Chains, and would perform covers of the Pixies and Nirvana. Upon starting university, bassist Dave Vachon joined and the band took the name the Bacchae, also recruiting drummer Dom McCready and organ-player Rob the Fox. This band began by performing covers by the Thirteenth Floor Elevators, the Seeds and Chocolate Watchband, then progressing to Roxy Music, T. Rex and the Stooges. Once they started writing original music, they began to post their recordings on MySpace.

In 2010, they changed their band name Black Moth, in reference to the poem "Lament for the Moths" by Tennessee Williams. The choice was inspired by Manic Street Preachers' frequent moth motif. They performed their first show as Black Moth in Bradford, in support of That Fucking Tank. In 2012, they recruited second guitarist Nico Carew. The band released three full-length albums, all produced by Jim Sclavunos (Grinderman, Nick Cave and the Bad Seeds). Carew would leave the band in 2015 to focus on his other group (X-Ray Cat Trio) and was subsequently replaced by Federica Gialanze. Their second album, Condemned to Hope, had its cover created by Roger Dean. It generated mixed to positive reviews from reputable websites like TeamRock, Prog and PopMatters.

In September 2019, the band announced the end of their activities, with a farewell show booked for 6 December of the same year.

== Musical style and influences ==
Critics categorised Black Moth's music as stoner rock, doom metal, garage punk and grunge. Their music as the Bacchae was mostly garage punk-influenced, beginning to write more metal-influenced material following their name change.

They cited influences including Black Sabbath, the Stooges, Mastodon, Red Fang, Pissed Jeans, Drunk in Hell, Kvelertak, Uncle Acid & the Deadbeats, Turbowolf, Blacklisters, Nick Cave and the Bad Seeds, Swans, Bo Ningen, Goat and Arabrot, L7, Alice in Chains, Nirvana, PJ Harvey, Mick Jagger, Lux Interior and the Sonics.

Metal Hammer called them "a linchpin in a late-00s Leeds scene that was bursting with heavy, energetic and varied bands". In 2018, Musicradar named them as an example of why "Leeds is rapidly becoming the UK’s capital of alt-heavy" alongside Pulled Apart by Horses, Hawk Eyes and Dinosaur Pile-Up. Kerrang! called them "one of the brightest lights in the British stoner/doom scene".

== Discography ==
=== Albums ===
- The Killing Jar (2012)
- Condemned to Hope (2014)
- Anatomical Venus (2018)

=== Singles ===
- "The Articulate Dead" (2010)
- "Black Moth" / "XM-3A" (split single, 2011)
- "Savage Dancer" / "Tree of Woe" (2013)
- "Sisters of the Stone" (2018)

== Members ==
- Harriet Bevan – vocals (2008–2019)
- Jim Swainston – guitars (2008–2019)
- Dave Vachon – bass (2010–2019)
- Dom McCready – drums (2009–2019)
- Rob the Fox – organ (2009–2010)
- Nico Carew – guitars (2012–2015)
- Federica Gialanze – guitars (2015–2019)
