= Tigercub =

English rock band

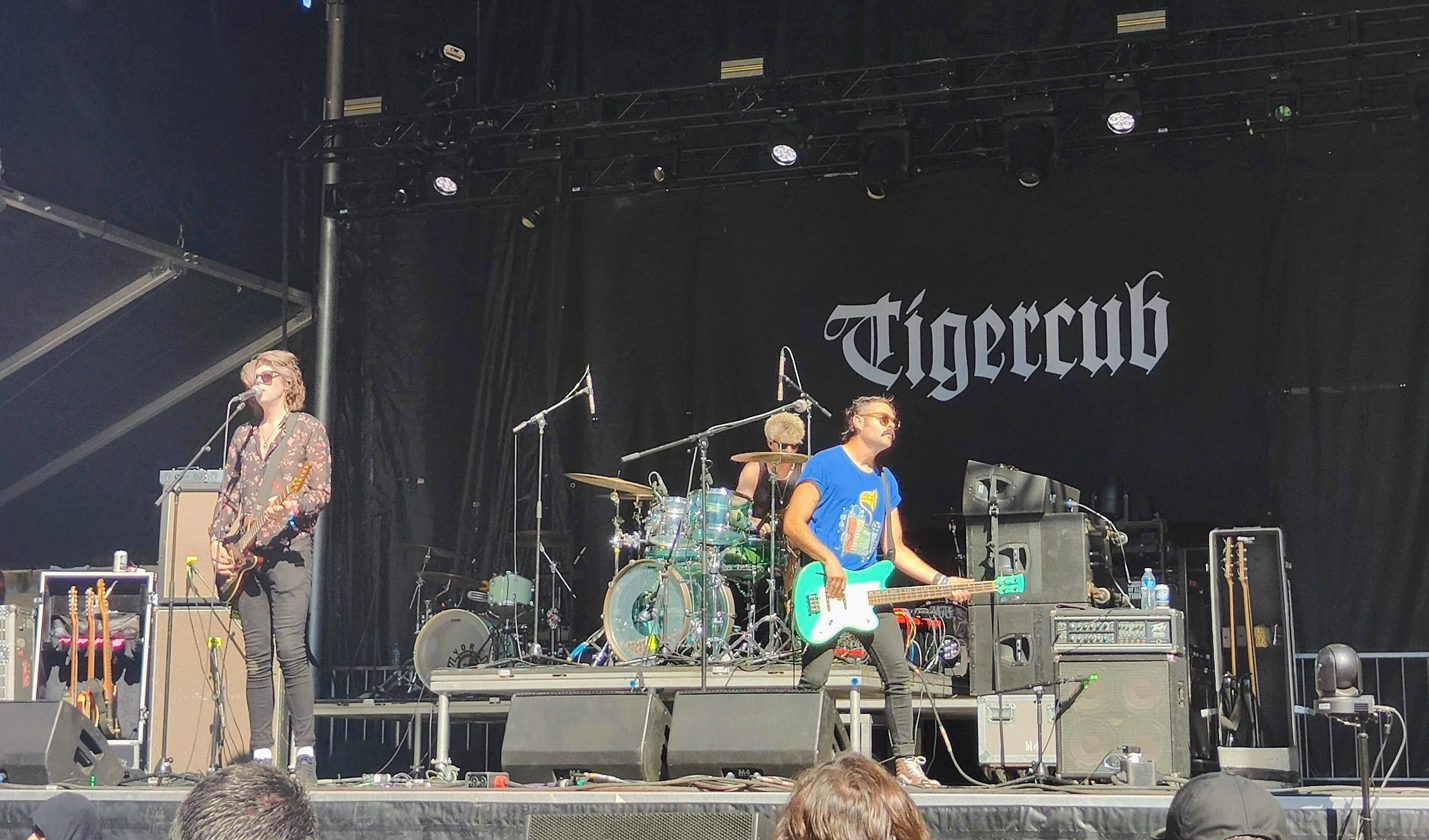
- Tigercub performing live in 2023.

Background information
- Origin: Brighton, East Sussex, UK
- Genres: Alternative rock; stoner rock; grunge
- Years active: 2011–present
- Labels: Raygun; P-Vine; Smack Face; Loosegroove; Alcopop!; Venn
- Members: Jamie Stephen Hall; James Allix; Jimi Wheelwright
- Website: tigercubtigercub.com

Tigercub are an English rock band from Brighton. Formed in 2011, they began as a duo consisting of singer and guitarist Jamie Stephen Hall, drummer James Allix. They grew to a trio in 2012, with the hiring of bassist Jimi Wheelwright, releasing their debut EP Hands the next year. The EP caught the attention of Dinosaur Pile-Up who led into an increase noteriety for the band, as well as linking them with Tom Dalgety for the recording of the single "Blue Blood". Around 2014, Tigercub befriended Royal Blood, who brought them further noteriety. Tigercub's debut album Abstract Figures in the Dark was released in 2015 through Alcopop! Records. It was followed by the Evolve or Die EP in 2017. Tigercub's fusion of grunge and stoner rock made them a prominent player in the 2010s grunge revival, which also included Pulled Apart by Horses and Milk Teeth. Soon, the band entered a hiatus, when Hall focused on his soloproject Nancy. Their hiatus ended the early 2020s, releasing their second album As Blue as Indigo in 2021. In 2023, they released The Perfume Of Decay, followed by Nets to Catch the Wind in 2026.

== History ==
=== Formation and early releases (2011–2016) ===
Tigercub was formed by Jamie Stephen Hall (vocals and guitar) and James Allix (drums) in 2011. The founding members met at their university in Brighton. In 2012, Hall and Allix were joined by Jimi Wheelwright (bass). The band recorded and self-released the Hands EP at Brighton Electric in 2013. The release caught the attention of Matt Bigland, vocalist of Dinosaur Pile-Up, who requested for the band to open for them on their next tour. They accept, and on the tour Bigland took interest in Tigercub's unreleased song "Blue Blood", leading to him to co-produce the single alongside Tom Dalgety. It was released as a single on Raygun Records in 2014 and became the band's first commercial release. Meeting through both using rehearsal rooms in Brighton Electric, Tigercub met Royal Blood. Between 13 and 26 February 2014, Tigercub toured the UK with Royal Blood.

The band went back into Brighton Electric to record a double A-side "Centrefold"/"Trendsetter" with Dalgety, which was released on Jazz Life in 2014. In November 2014, Tigercub toured Europe with Blood Red Shoes. On 6 March 2015, they released the demo single "Hold On". Tigercub released the double A-side "Destroy"/"You" on limited-edition vinyl with Too Pure Records, and digitally with Brighton label Cannibal Hymns. An exclusive CD compilation Meet Tigercub was released with P-Vine Records in Japan and with Smack Face Music in Australia. Tigercub signed to Venn Records to release Repressed Semantics in November 2015. The EP was supported by Tigercub's first UK headline tour, followed by a series of dates across Europe with Dilly Dally. The Guardian described Repressed Semantics as "a self-contained world for you to discover and get lost in", and Crack Magazine called Tigercub "one of Brighton's most promising up-and-coming bands". Between 14 and 26 November 2015, they toured the UK supporting Muskets, alongside the New Tusk.

=== Abstract Figures in the Dark and Evolve or Die EP (2016–2021) ===
Tigercub's first full-length album, Abstract Figures in the Dark, was released on 11 November 2016, via Alcopop! Records. The album was produced by Alex Newport and mastered by John Greenham. The press response was positive and highlighted the album's difficult themes and genre-defying content. Clash said that the release was "jagged and harsh. It is a pill that isn't easily swallowed, nor digested; it is emotionally overwhelming and entirely self-aware. It doesn't fit neatly into a box on the shelf marked 'punk' or 'grunge.'"

Tigercub released their second EP Evolve or Die in 2017 via Alcopop! Records. Dork said, "Throughout the four-track offering every moment counts, adding up to a journey that feels fleeting but necessary. New depths are explored with 'Into The Ashes' conjuring imagery of dystopian-type fallout, while 'It's Only Love' begins as a melancholic number, but soon morphs into a different beast entirely, with a funk-driven heart (...) every second yields either complete devotion or self-realisation." Between 23 May and 2 September, they toured Europe with support from Shit Girlfriend and Nelson Can. They performed at Reading and Leeds Festivals 2017. Between 16 and 27 October,they headlined a tour of the United Kingdom with support from Weirds, Cassels and Husky Loops. After constant touring, the band took a break to pursue other creative outlets, including Hall's side-project Nancy.

=== As Blue as Indigo, The Perfume of Decay and Nets to Catch the Wind (2021–present) ===
As Blue as Indigo was written by Hall and co-produced by Hall and Adrian Bushby. Bushby also engineered the record. As Blue as Indigo was later mixed by Tom Dalgety and released on BLAME Recordings. The title of the album hints at Hall's introspective approach to lyrical themes, exploring personal topics including anxiety, depression, toxic masculinity, the death of his grandmother, and the recent suicide of a close friend. As Blue as Indigo reached number one on the Independent Album Breakers, number five on the UK Rock & Metal chart, number 11 on the UK Independent Albums chart, number 12 on the Vinyl Chart, and number 30 on the UK Physical Albums Chart. Kerrang! writer Mischa Pearlman listed it as one of top albums of the year. During this period, the band toured extensively with Royal Blood. The band recorded an Amazon Original track, "Overload", in August 2021.

When beginning to write their third album, Hall found himself "so baked into my own process, I was just getting the same results being thrown up over and over again". This led him to co-wrote some of the tracks with Dominic Craik, guitarist for Nothing but Thieves. The Perfume of Decay was written and produced by Hall. It was released on Stone Gossard's Loosegroove Records on 2 June 2023. The album's song "Cut the Eyes Out the Photographs" was originally envisioned to feature Faris Badwan, vocalist of the Horrors. When approached Badwan turned the offer down, leading Hall to instead ask Neil Fallon of Clutch, who accepted. On 6 February 2024, Stone Gossard released a remix of the Tigercub song "Show Me My Maker".

On 10 April 2026, they released the single "I'm Breaking Out", coinciding with the release of their fourth studio album Nets to Catch the Wind. A release show for the Nets to Catch Wind took place at the Koko in London, which was "their biggest-ever headline show".

== Musical style and influences ==
Critics have categorised Tigercub's music as stoner rock, grunge and alternative rock. Nightshift magazine called them "nu grunge". They incorporate elements of sludge metal, noise rock, pop rock, indie rock, heavy metal, garage rock, psychedelic rock, atmospheric music, noise music and progressive rock. Before their album, their music was faithful to the sound of grunge, but they began to experiment more on Burning Effigies. Abstract Figures in the Dark leaned further into grunge and punk. Evolve Or Die moved away from grunge and embraced a greater use of electronic music elements.

Their music riff-based, making use of fuzz, and emphasising the bass. AllMusic called them both "Muse-meets QOTSA-style art-metal and brash but melodic indie/alt-rock". Noizze said that their music "bares the hallmarks of alt-rock, neo-grunge, stoner metal and more without ever committing fully to a singular genre nor style." New Noise called them "Queens of the Stone Age with a British bend". Kerrang! described their sound as being "as if you pumped Royal Blood full of steroids, added the falsetto fusion of Matt Bellamy with Josh Homme, and cranked it all up to 11". Amped said Hall's "voice carries echoes of Jarvis Cocker's theatrical baritone".

Tigercub have cited influences including Queens of the Stone Age, Black Flag, Fugazi, Nirvana, Rage Against the Machine, Led Zeppelin, the Dandy Warhols, Jeff Buckley and Pulp. On Abstract Figures in the Dark (2016), they were inspired by Audioslave, Ash, Muse and Radiohead's album The Bends (1995). On Nets to Catch the Wind (2026), they were inspired by Sisters of Mercy, the Cure, Bauhaus, Joy Division, Killing Joke and the Chameleons.

Alongside Milk Teeth and God Damn, Tigercub were a part of the 2010s grunge revival. They took part in a heavier strand of the movement, which also included Pulled Apart by Horses. Tigercub have been cited as an influence by Fangclub and Delaire the Liar. They have been cited as a favourite by Royal Blood.

== Members ==
- Jamie Stephen Hall – vocals, guitar (2011–present)
- James Allix – drums (2011–present)
- Jimi Wheelwright – bass (2012–present)

== Discography ==
Studio albums

- Abstract Figures in the Dark (Alcopop! Records, 2016)
- As Blue as Indigo (BLAME Recordings, 2021)
- The Perfume of Decay (Loosegroove Records, 2023)
- Nets to Catch the Wind (2026)

Compilation albums

- Meet Tigercub (P-Vine Records, Japanese exclusive CD, 2015)

EPs

- Repressed Semantics (VENN Records, 2015)
- Evolve or Die (Alcopop! Records, 2017)

Singles

Song	Year	Peak chart positions	Album	Link
Song	Year	US Main.	Album	Link
"Blue Blood"	2014	—	Non-album singles	
"Centrefold"/"Trendsetter"	2014	—	Non-album singles	
"Destroy"/"You"	2015	—	Non-album singles	
"Stop Beating on My Heart (Like a Bass Drum)"	2021	—	As Blue as Indigo	
"Beauty"	2021	—	As Blue as Indigo	
"Blue Mist In My Head"	2021	—	As Blue as Indigo	
"The Perfume of Decay"	2022	28	The Perfume of Decay	
"Play My Favourite Song"	2023	—	The Perfume of Decay	
"Fall In Fall Out"	2025	—	Nets to Catch the Wind	
"I'm Breaking Out"	2026	—	Nets to Catch the Wind	
"A Black Moon"	2026	—	Nets to Catch the Wind	

Music videos

List of music videos, showing year released and album/EP name
Title	Year	Directors
"Centrefold"	2014	Unknown
"Antiseptic"	2016	Unknown
"Omen"	2016	Unknown
"Memory Boy"	2016	Unknown
"Control"	2017	Unknown
"By Design"	2017	Unknown
"The Divided States of Us"	2017	Glashier
"Stop Beating My Heart (Like a Bass Drum)"	2021	Michael Bedwell
"Funeral"	2021	Avocado Baby
"Blue Mist In My Head"	2021	SKUMBAGOVICH
"I.W.G.F.U (I Wanna Get Fucked Up)"	2021	Michael Bedwell
"The Perfume of Decay"	2023	Michael Bedwell
"Show Me My Maker"	2023	Unknown
"Fall In Fall Out"	2025	Unknown
"I'm Breaking Out"	2026	Three Bros Media
"Silver Smile"	2026	Daniel Goode
