= Irk (band) =

English rock band

- Origin: Leeds, West Yorkshire, UK
- Genres: Noise rock; math rock; post-punk; mathcore; experimental rock
- Years active: 2013–present
- Labels: Voice of Chunk, Nefarious Industries
- Members: Jack Gordon; Ed Snell; Matt Deamer

Irk is an English rock band from Leeds. Formed in 2013 by J.S. Gordon (vocals), Matthew Deamer (drums) and Ed Snell (bass), they released their debut EP Bread and Honey in 2014. Their debut album Recipes From the Bible was released in 2018, which was followed by The Seeing House in 2025. Merging elements of noise rock, mathcore and post-punk, Irk were one of the most prominent acts in the Chunk collective, which grew an experimental music scene in Leeds and helped to establish the 2010s post-punk revival.

== History ==
Irk was formed in 2013, by J.S. Gordon (vocals), Matthew Deamer (drums) and Ed Snell (bass). They emerged from the Leeds hardcore punk and noise rock scenes. In 2014, they started the record label Voice of Chunk to release Irk's EP Bread and Honey, which was released on 24 May. On 16 March 2015, they released a split EP with Wren.

On 27 September 2018, they released the single "Spectre At the Fiesta" announcing it would be a part of their debut album Recipes from the Bible. They also released the single "I Bleed Horses". On 30 October, they released the single "Life Changing Porno". On 3 December, they released the single "Insect Worship". Recipes from the Bible was released on 7 December.

On 15 September 2025, they released the single "Wedding, Berlin", announcing it would be a part of their second album The Seeing House, released on 26 September.

== Musical style ==
Critics have categorised Irk's music as post-punk, math rock, mathcore, experimental rock and noise rock. They incorporate elements of no wave, sludge metal, grunge, heavy metal, dance rock, metalcore, punk rock, progressive rock and jazz. Drowned in Sound called their music "shronk".

Having no guitarist, Irk's songs are generally around bass and rhythms. Some bass lines were effected by fuzz and a looper pedal. They make use of unconventional instruments for rock music, such as saxophones, cellos and beer keg percussion. Their songs are often dissonant, abrasive and unpredictable, using a mid-tempo and staccato playing style. They experiment with time signatures and make use of angular riffs. They use the production of modern hardcore punk with the songwriting of 1990s noise rock. Their albums feature a variety of sounds, often switching between complex, progressive tracks and shorter hardcore tracks Gordon's vocals are screamed often high pitched fry screams. He sometimes uses a spoken word delivery His lyrics make use of left-field humour and surrealism.

Ghost Cult said their sound "harkens back to what Nirvana were doing on the Bleach album", while Already Heard called them a "a rawer, more mathy Slaves or Idles". Punktastic described them as "like the Jesus Lizard took a dose of mathcore pills", and Wonderbox called them "the bastard offspring of noise rock, post-punk and mathcore".

Their songs are typically written through recording jam sessions between Snell and Deamer. The pair then pick out their favourite elements of each jam, and jam against around only those elements. Once they are happy with the instruments, they will then send their recording to Gordon to write his parts.

Irk have cited influences including Kong, Converge, the Mountain Goats, Daughters, Yeah Yeah Yeahs, Couch Slut, Shellac, Lightning Bolt, the Jesus Lizard, Usane, Zs, This Heat, Glenn Branca, Ruins, Little Women, Sleeping People, Slint, Polvo, Yowie, Don Caballero, Meet Me in St. Louis, Mclusky, Gilla Band, Death From Above 1979, Arab on Radar, the Locust, Meshuggah, System of a Down, Tool, Primus, Wesley Willis, Björk, John Coltrane and Krzysztof Penderecki.

== Legacy ==
Alongside Cattle, Irk were a part of a wave of Leeds noise rock bands that built upon the foundation laid by Blacklisters. Post-Trash as within a "tradition of incredible noise rock bands from the UK", including Mclusky, Blacklisters, Kong and Biege Palace. Distorted Sound credited them as pioneering a sound between sludge metal, the post-Brexit new wave of Idles and the hardcore punk of Every Time I Die.

They were one of the most prominent acts to come from the Chunk collective. The collective's musical diversity encouraged the community to be more experimental. Gavin Butt, author of No Machos and Pop Stars, described Chunk as one of the points of "impetus" for the 2010s post-punk revival. By 2015, Leeds List had observed that "There’s a growing influence emanating from the self-styled musical collective that’s gradually beginning to bear fruit". In 2017, The Line of Best Fit called Chunk "a bastion of all things weird, wonderful and uncouth in Leeds for time immemorial".

Irk have been cited as an influence by Blacklisters and Bearfoot Beware. They have been cited as a favourite by USA Nails and James Smith of Post-War Glamour Girls and Yard Act.

== Members ==
- Jack Gordon – vocals
- Ed Snell – bass
- Matt Deamer – drums

== Discography ==
Studio albums

- Recipes From the Bible (2018)
- The Seeing House (2025)

EPs

- Bread and Honey (2014)
- Irk / Wren (2015; split EP with Wren)
