= Love Now =

Love Now may refer to:

- Love, Now, 2012–2013 Taiwanese television show
- Love Now (film), 2007 South Korean film
- "Love Now", song on English band Mott's 1975 album Drive On
- "Love Now", song on Scottish DJ Calvin Harris' 2014 album Motion

== See also ==
- Love Now, Pay Later, 1959 West German drama film
- Why Love Now, 2017 album by American band Pissed Jeans
