= Eleven Eleven (Dinosaur Pile-Up album) =

Studio album by Dinosaur Pile-Up
- Released: 16 October 2015
- Genre: Alternative rock, post-grunge
- Label: SO Recordings, A-Sketch
- Producer: Tom Dalgety

Dinosaur Pile-Up chronology
11:11 (2015)	Eleven Eleven (2015)	Celebrity Mansions (2019)

Singles from Nature Nurture
- 1. "11:11" Released: 2015

Alternative cover
- Japan Edition cover

Eleven Eleven is the third studio album by British alternative rock band Dinosaur Pile-Up. The album was produced by Tom Dalgety and was released on 16 October 2015 in Europe, 21 October 2015 in Japan and 26 August 2016 in the United States. It was supported in Japan with the release of the country-exclusive 11:11 EP, which was released on 22 July 2015 and included four tracks, including the deluxe edition bonus track. Unlike the previous album Nature Nurture, there were no bonus tracks included on the Japanese album.

== Critical reception ==
Professional ratings
Review scores
Source	Rating
Renowned for Sound	2.5/5 stars
Rolling Stone Australia	4/5 stars
Sound Fiction	8.5/10 stars

The album has received mostly moderate to favourable reviews. Rod Yates of Rolling Stone Australia stated "the likes of 'Friend Of Mine' and 'Willow Tree' are like sonic shots of adrenaline, 'Anxiety Trip' is as sludgy as molasses, while 'Crystalline' proves the trio know their way around a good chorus. Textured closer 'Cross My Heart' suggests the band are capable of broadening their sonic palette."

== Track listing ==
Standard edition
No.	Title	Length
1.	"11:11"	4:04
2.	"Red and Purple"	3:36
3.	"Grim Valentine"	3:04
4.	"Friend of Mine"	2:19
5.	"Nothing Personal"	3:43
6.	"Anxiety Trip"	3:40
7.	"Might As Well"	3:53
8.	"Gimme Something"	1:38
9.	"Bad Penny"	2:48
10.	"Crystalline"	3:41
11.	"Willow Tree"	3:09
12.	"Cross My Heart"	4:01
Total length:		37:36

Deluxe Edition (iTunes)
No.	Title	Length
13.	"Replace Me"	3:35
Total length:		40:11

== Charts ==
Chart (2015)	Peak position
Japan (Oricon Albums Chart)	255
UK (UK Albums Chart)	169
