= Fangclub =

Irish alternative rock band

- Origin: Rush, County Dublin, Ireland
- Genres: Grunge; garage punk; pop-punk; punk rock; noise rock
- Years active: 2013–present
- Label: Vertigo
- Members: Steven King; Kevin Keane; Dara Coleman
- Website: fangclubmusic.com

Fangclub are an Irish alternative rock band from Rush, County Dublin. Formed in 2013, they quickly signed to Vertigo Records, who released their debut self-titled album in 2017. Fangclub became one of the most prominent Irish bands in the 2010s grunge revival. They released their second album Vulture Culture in 2019.

== History ==
Steven King (guitar/vocals), Kevin Keane (bass) met while attending school in Rush, County Dublin, and performed in various bands together. The pair met Dara Coleman (drums) at a party, having previously seen his old bands perform. They formed Fangclub in 2013. They played their first live show in December 2014.

They went to the coastal village of Ballyheigue in County Kerry to record over 25 tracks, which was self-financed. In early 2015 while on one of their DIY tours, they came to the attention of Universal Music's Irish team. Suitably impressed that Fangclub had already recorded an albums worth of music, Universal signed the band in August 2015. They became apart of the Univeral Music subsidiary Vertigo Records.

Largely comprising songs from their original D.I.Y. efforts, their second EP, Coma Happy, appeared in 2016. They then took to the road, headlining a sold-out show at Whelan's, Dublin and concluding the festival season with two sets at Electric Picnic. Fangclub made their U.K. live debut in 2016 with Welsh group Pretty Vicious, and also toured with Twin Atlantic.

Their self-titled debut album was released in 2017. The album reached number 5 on the Irish album charts and received positive reviews from critics, with The Irish Times calling it "one of the best hard rock albums of 2017". In January 2018, the album was nominated for the Choice Music Prize. Between 7 and 20 May 2017, they headlined a tour of the United Kingdom. On the live circuit, Fangclub have supported bands such as Metallica, Smashing Pumpkins, Pixies, Muse, Biffy Clyro, Twin Atlantic, Nothing But Thieves, The Cribs, Swmrs and Frank Carter and the Rattlesnakes.

The band released their second album Vulture Culture on 5 July 2019. Vulture Culture received positive reviews, with Hot Press writing; "this 11-track opus is most certainly the jewel in the Irish alt-rock kings’ crown to date."

The single "Attention" was released on 1 March 2024. On 19 April of the same year, Out Of My Head, released on various streaming platforms. On the 14 June 2024, the EP 'All Good' was released. It included singles Attention and Out Of My Head, with an additional three tracks (Natural, You Had Me At Hello, and Exit Oblivion).

== Musical style and influences ==
Critics have categorised Fangclub's music as grunge, punk rock, garage punk, noise rock and pop-punk.

NME have stated that "Fangclub are a fully formed thrash pop monster; melodic, frenzied and phenomenal. Imagine a beefed-up Tribes, or Cloverfield glam. If Fontaines are piloting the new Irish punk blitz, Fangclub are the Big Boys in the bomb bay." The Guardian wrote that the group "are obviously a leftover band from the 90s grunge scene who slipped through some sort of time portal and are stuck here, thrashing their guitars against the raging of the sun."

Fangclub were a part of the 2010s grunge revival. They were one of its most prominent Irish acts, alongside Bitch Falcon and Gilla Band.

Fangclub have cited influences including Dinosaur Pile-Up, Pulled Apart by Horses, Marmozets, Tigercub, Royal Blood, Death from Above 1979, Reuben, Foo Fighters, Queens of the Stone Age, Smashing Pumpkins, Weezer, Radiohead, Soulwax, Supergrass, Black Rebel Motorcycle Club, Interpol, the Subways, Yeah Yeah Yeahs, the Cribs, the Strokes, the Hives, Cage the Elephant, Jeff the Brotherhood, Metric, Sonic Youth, Heatmiser, Placebo, My Bloody Valentine, Rozwell Kid, Pond, Wavves, Courtney Barnett, Violent Soho, Fidlar, Basement, Jimmy Eat World, Alkaline Trio, Bad Religion, Rancid, Frank Iero, Touché Amoré, the Bronx, Whipping Boy, Local H, the Muffs, P.J. Harvey, Beck, Alice in Chains, Soundgarden, Nirvana, Nine Black Alps, Elliott Smith, Blur, the Offspring, the Distillers, NOFX, the Vines, Green Day and the Pixies. In a 2018 interview with Itsallindie, King stated of their influences "We are very influenced by whatever cool creeps into Ireland so for instance, I’m completely influenced by a lot of American culture".

== Members ==
Current

- Steven King – lead vocals, guitar (2013–present)
- Kevin Keane – bass guitar (2013–present)
- Dara Coleman – drums, percussion (2013–present)

Touring Members

- Ed Scanlan – guitar (2019–present)

== Discography ==
Fangclub discography
- Studio albums: 2
- EPs: 3
- Singles: 2
- Music videos: 12

=== Studio albums ===
Year	Details	Peak chart positions
Year	Details	IRL
2017	Fangclub: Released: 4 August 2017; Label: Vertigo; Formats: CD, download	5
2019	Vulture Culture: Released: 5 July 2019; Label: Vertigo; Formats: CD, download	31

=== Singles / EPs ===
Year	Title	Label	Track list
2016	Bullet Head: Released: 30 March 2016; Label: Headwire; Formats: 10" vinyl, download	Headwire Records	1. Bullet Head; 2. Young Blood; 3. Loner; 4. Role Models
2016	Coma Happy: Released: 18 November 2016; Label: Vertigo; Formats: 10" vinyl, download	Vertigo Records	1. Dreamcatcher; 2. Follow; 3. Inside Joke; 4. Coma Happy
2018	All Fall Down: Released: 16 March 2018; Label: Vertigo; Formats: Download	Vertigo Records	1. All Fall Down
2018	True Love: Released: 29 June 2018; Label: Vertigo; Formats: 10" vinyl, download	Vertigo Records	1. Knife; 2. Heart Is A Landmine; 3. Smother; 4. Sweater Forever; 5. High
2019	Viva Violent: Released: 25 October 2019; Label: Vertigo; Formats: Download	Vertigo Records	1. Viva Violent; 2. All Fall Down (Acoustic)
2024	Attention: Released: 1 March 2024; Label: Headwire; Formats:	Headwire Records	1. Attention
2024	Out Of My Head: Released: 19 April 2024; Label: Headwire; Formats:	Headwire Records	1. Out Of My Head
2024	All Good: Released: 14 June 2024; Label: Headwire; Formats:	Headwire Records	1. Attention; 2. Out Of My Head; 3. Natural; 4. You Had Me At Hello; 5. Exit Oblivion
2025	So Easy: Released: August 29th 2025; Label: Headwire; Formats:	Headwire Records	1. So Easy
2025	Champagne Problems: Released: September 19th 2025; Label: Headwire; Formats:	Headwire Records	1. Champagne Problems
2025	Half Life: Released: October 10th 2025; Label: Headwire; Formats:	Headwire Records	1. Half Life
2025	Half Life: Released: October 31st 2025; Label: Headwire; Formats:	Headwire Records	1. So Easy; 2. Champagne Problems 3. Devotion Sickness 4. Half Life 5. Neighbourhood

== Awards and nominations ==
=== Choice Music Prize ===
Year	Nominated work	Award	Result
2017	Fangclub	Album of the Year	Nominated
