= Growing Pains (Dinosaur Pile-Up album) =

Studio album by Dinosaur Pile-Up
- Released: 4 October 2010
- Recorded: Late 2009–early 2010
- Genre: Alternative rock, post-grunge, punk rock, noise rock
- Label: Friends vs. Records
- Producer: James Kenosha, Matt Bigland, Kevin Vanbergen

Dinosaur Pile-Up chronology
The Most Powerful EP in the Universe!! (2009)	Growing Pains (2010)	Peninsula (2013)

Singles from Growing Pains
- 1. "Birds And Planes" Released: 24 August 2010; 2. "Mona Lisa" Released: 27 September 2010; 3. "My Rock N Roll" Released: 28 March 2011

Growing Pains is the debut studio album from the English alternative rock band Dinosaur Pile-Up. The album was released for CD, vinyl and digital download on 4 October 2011 on the Friends vs Records label.

== Background ==
The whole album was recorded solely by lead singer and guitarist Matt Bigland in a homemade studio in Bridlington between late 2009 and early 2010. Also around this time, Steve Wilson (drums) and Tom Dornford-May (bass) left the band to pursue other projects. This meant whilst Matt was recording Growing Pains he had to bring in new members Harry Johns (bass) and Mike Shiels (drums). The album was released 4 October 2010. In September 2009, an early version of "All Around the World" was featured in the video game Colin McRae: Dirt 2.

== Reviews ==
The reviews for Growing Pains have been moderate to favorable.

NME rated Growing Pains a 7/10, saying that "DP-U don’t give the most fleeting of shits about anything even remotely modern. Having said that, seeing as most of the attention focused on them thus far has focused on their being either (kindly) grunge revivalists or (unkindly) Nirvana copyists, it’s worth making clear that 'Growing Pains' is significantly better than either description suggests. Sure, there's more than a hint of the Cobain in the ragged guitars and slightly self-centred lyrical conceits, but rather than just aping Nirvana they instead share similar influences – particularly Pixies and Melvins – as well as update the mid-'90s college rock sound that Archers of Loaf, Guided By Voices and Built To Spill made their own."

The Guardian gave the album 4/5 stars, saying, "Growing Pains is part Nirvana with the confrontation dialled down, part Foo Fighters with the punkishness turned up. It's great, rowdy fun, though, and nothing gets in the way of the tunes: Never That Together keeps teasing the listener with a brief lift from the Beatles' "Please Please Me", and former singles Mona Lisa, My Rock'n'Roll and Traynor should have been hits."

AddictMusic.com gave the album 3/5 stars and have stated, "On the album there is only one track that leaves the relentless guitar chugging behind and opts for a softer direction – 'Hey You'. It is a shame because 'Hey You' is very beautiful, and shows the guys do have musical talent. More importantly it shows they are not afraid to deviate from their archetypal sound, yet for some reason they choose not to". The review also lists 'Birds and Planes', 'Never That Together' and 'Maybe Its You' as favorites and says, "Dinosaur Pile-Up have huge potential and they are definitely ones to look out for in the future, but 'Growing Pains' is just a little too repetitive to make it more than just another alt-rock album."

== Track listing ==
All songs written and composed by Matt Bigland.

No.	Title	Length
1.	"Birds and Planes"	3:28
2.	"Barce-loner"	3:11
3.	"Never That Together"	2:42
4.	"Mona Lisa"	3:56
5.	"Broken Knee"	3:29
6.	"Hey Man (Home You Ruin)"	5:17
7.	"My Rock n Roll"	4:01
8.	"Maybe It's You"	3:16
9.	"Love to Hate Me"	3:27
10.	"Traynor"	2:58
11.	"Hey You"	5:34
12.	"All Around the World" (ends at 6:08, secret track starts at 16:06)	17:37

== Personnel ==
- Matt Bigland – vocals, guitar
- Mike Sheils – drums
- Harry Johns – bass, vocals
