= Honeys (album) =

Studio album by Pissed Jeans
- Released: February 12, 2013
- Genre: Punk rock, hardcore punk, noise rock
- Length: 35:21
- Label: Sub Pop
- Producer: Alex Newport

Pissed Jeans chronology
| King of Jeans (2009) | Honeys (2013) | Why Love Now (2017) |

Honeys is the fourth studio album released on February 12, 2013, by the Allentown, Pennsylvania based band Pissed Jeans, and their third since signing to US label Sub Pop.

== Style ==
Lyrically, the album revolves around frontman Matt Korvette coming to terms with adulthood and working a middle class job. He stated that "I think we've certainly moved further into adulthood and more responsibilities. We all have families of our own at this point, and generally just feel less like wild and immature kids and more like adults, which is a pretty horrifying prospect in a lot of ways....There's less teenage/post-teenage angst in our lives. Now it's all adult angst." Korvette has affirmed that most of his lyrics are self-directed, and range from addressing his misogyny ("I know I've been guilty of that in the past. And that song was just the apology for being misogynist throughout my life.") to coming to grips with his own mortality ("I think about cancer a lot. It's a horrible thing. I wonder if that's what my demise will be. If I got hit by a bus, that would be so much nicer.")

== Reception ==
Professional ratings
Aggregate scores
| Source | Rating |
|---|---|
| AnyDecentMusic? | 7.7/10 |
| Metacritic | 82/100 |
Review scores
| Source | Rating |
| AllMusic | 4/5 stars |
| Pitchfork | 8.1/10 |
| PopMatters | 8/10 |
| Slant Magazine | 4/5 stars |
| Spin | 8/10 |

Metacritic gave the album a score of 82, indicating "universal acclaim" based on 33 critics. Praising Honeys for its "roomier, more open sound" that gives "the album more of a snarling quality than its more guttural predecessor," Gregory Heaney wrote for Allmusic that "Honeys is punk rock for everyone who's had to dedicate less time to their ideals and more time toward paying the cable bill and buying diapers". Describing the album as the band's best to date, Ian Cohen wrote for Pitchfork that "Pissed Jeans allow themselves enough versatility to keep Honeys intense and interesting throughout, fashioning a loser's history of alt.rock that honors some of the most abrasive bands to get a deal post-Nevermind. Noting how Honeys further refined Pissed Jeans' sound, PopMatters' Matthew Fiander lauded the album as "scathing and brilliant".

== Track listing ==
Honeys track listing
| No. | Title | Length |
|---|---|---|
| 1. | "Bathroom Laughter" | 2:38 |
| 2. | "Chain Worker" | 2:52 |
| 3. | "Romanticize Me" | 2:12 |
| 4. | "Vain In Costume" | 2:26 |
| 5. | "You're Different (In Person)" | 2:34 |
| 6. | "Cafeteria Food" | 3:36 |
| 7. | "Something About Mrs. Johnson" | 1:22 |
| 8. | "Male Gaze" | 4:07 |
| 9. | "Cathouse" | 2:35 |
| 10. | "Loubs" | 4:50 |
| 11. | "Health Plan" | 2:16 |
| 12. | "Teenage Adult" | 3:53 |
