= Shallow (album) =

Studio album by Pissed Jeans
- Released: January 20, 2005
- Genre: Hardcore punk, noise rock, grunge
- Length: 32:42
- Label: Parts Unknown Records, Sub Pop

Pissed Jeans chronology
Shallow (2005)	Hope For Men (2007)

Shallow is the debut studio album by Pissed Jeans. Released in 2005, the album features elements of noise rock and hardcore punk. The album can be described what "sounds like a big pile of mud and broken glass ripping through your stereo speakers in the most killer way imaginable."

== Track listing ==
No.	Title	Length
1.	"I'm Sick"	2:23
2.	"Boring Girls"	3:36
3.	"Ugly Twin"	7:23
4.	"Ashamed of My Cum"	1:50
5.	"Closet Marine"	4:18
6.	"I Broke My Own Heart"	4:37
7.	"Little Sorrell"	2:47
8.	"Wachovia"	5:48
Total length:		32:42

Remastered Edition Bonus Tracks
No.	Title	Length
1.	"Throbbing Organ"	2:37
2.	"Night Minutes"	3:47
