= Fangclub (album) =

Studio album by Fangclub
- Released: 4 August 2017
- Recorded: Spring 2017
- Genre: Alternative rock; punk rock
- Length: 33:52
- Label: Vertigo

Fangclub chronology
Coma Happy (2016)	Fangclub (2017)	True Love (2018)

Singles from Fangclub
- 1. "Bullet Head" Released: 2016; 2. "Coma Happy" Released: 2016; 3. "Bad Words" Released: 2017

Fangclub is the debut album by Irish alternative rock band, Fangclub. The album was released on 4 August 2017 through Vertigo Records.

== Track listing ==
All lyrics are written by Steven King; all music is composed by Steven King.

No.	Title	Length
1.	"Bullet Head"	2:01
2.	"Role Models"	3:24
3.	"Lightning"	3:41
4.	"Dreamcatcher"	3:28
5.	"Bad Words"	4:27
6.	"Best Fake Friends"	2:16
7.	"Common Ground"	3:11
8.	"Loner"	4:02
9.	"Better to Forget"	3:53
10.	"Animal Skin"	3:29
Total length:		33:52

== Charts ==
Chart (2017)	Peak position
Irish Albums (IRMA)	5
