= Nets to Catch the Wind =

Studio album by Tigercub
- Released: 10 April 2026
- Length: 42:30
- Label: Loosegroove
- Producer: Tom Dalgety

Tigercub chronology
The Perfume of Decay (2023)	Nets to Catch the Wind (2026)

Nets to Catch the Wind is the fourth studio album by British rock band Tigercub. It was released by Loosegroove Records on 10 April 2026 and features sole production from Tom Dalgety.

== Background and promotion ==
Tigercub announced Nets to Catch the Wind on 7 January 2026.

Nets to Catch the Wind was supported by three singles. Its lead single, "Fall In Fall Out", was released on 13 November 2025. Its final single, "A Black Moon", was released on 13 March 2026.

== Critical reception ==
Professional ratings
Review scores
Source	Rating
The Arts Desk	4/5 stars
Kerrang!	4/5
Spill Magazine	7/10

Tom Carr of The Arts Desk said, "With Nets to Catch the Wind, Tigercub feel primed to stake their well-earned claim on a larger stage". Rishi Shah of Kerrang! said its "nothing totally new, but they've subtly upskilled what they know they do best. If they're in this for the long game, such marginal gains will stand them in good stead". Jasmine Bhoodwah of Spill Magazine said it "is still something that would definitely be enjoyable to those that listen to alternative rock".

== Track listing ==
All tracks are written by Tigercub.

Nets to Catch the Wind track listing
No.	Title	Length
1.	"Silver Smile"	3:06
2.	"Fall In Fall Out"	3:47
3.	"Stuck in the Melancholy"	2:52
4.	"I'm Breaking Out"	3:33
5.	"A Black Moon"	3:14
6.	"Head Over Heels"	3:30
7.	"Nightmares"	6:19
8.	"My Paper Heart"	4:29
9.	"Golden Sands"	0:12
10.	"Magic Sleep"	3:16
11.	"Cut the Eyes Out of the Photographs"	4:17
12.	"Sadness, Don't You Worry"	3:55
Total length:		42:30

== Credits and personnel ==
Credits are adapted from Tidal.

Tigercub

- James Allix – drums
- Jamie Stephen Hall – lead vocals, electric guitar (tracks 1–8, 10–12); piano (9)
- James Wheelwright – electric bass guitar (1–8, 10–12)

Additional contributors

- Tom Dalgety – production, mixing
- Howie Weinberg – mastering
- Neil Fallon – spoken word (11)

== Charts ==
Chart performance for Nets to Catch the Wind
Chart (2026)	Peak position
UK Albums Sales (OCC)	46
UK Independent Albums (Official Charts)	23
UK Rock & Metal Albums (Official Charts)	7
