= Pissed Jeans =

American hardcore punk band

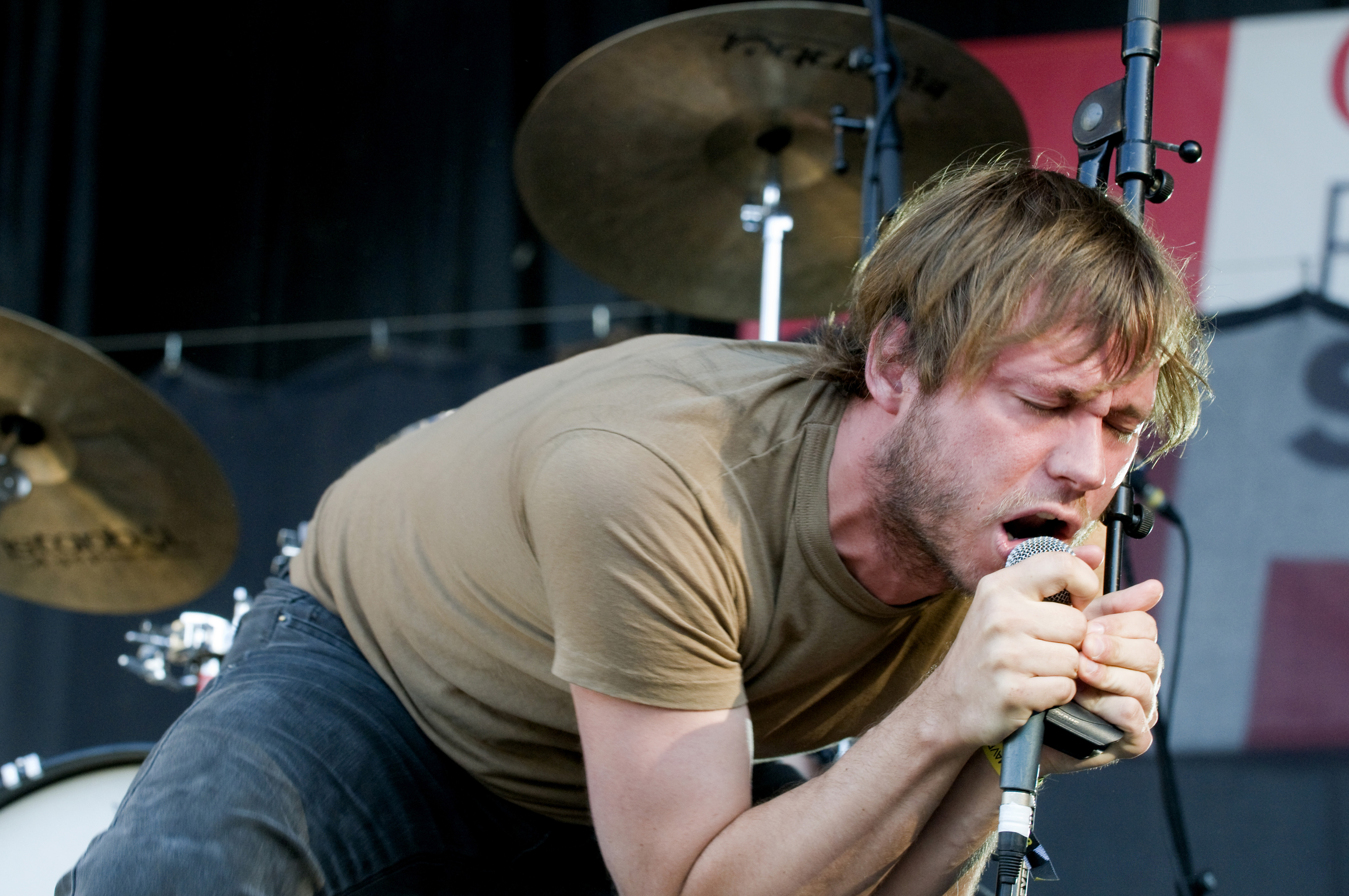
- Pissed Jeans in 2008

Background information
- Origin: Allentown, Pennsylvania, U.S.
- Genres: Hardcore punk; noise rock; post-hardcore
- Years active: 2004–present
- Labels: Sub Pop; Parts Unknown
- Members: Bradley Fry; Randy Huth; Matt Korvette; Sean McGuinness
- Past members: Dave Rosenstraus; Tim Wynarczuk

Pissed Jeans is an American hardcore punk band from Allentown, Pennsylvania. The band claims to play "loud, heavy, noisy, punk rock" and is influenced by 1980s hardcore punk and post-hardcore bands. The sound has been described as "the musical equivalent of watching a toilet flush." The band has released six albums and seven singles, and are currently signed to record label Sub Pop in Seattle.

== History ==
The members of Pissed Jeans all attended Nazareth Area High School in Nazareth, Pennsylvania in the Lehigh Valley region of eastern Pennsylvania, with the exception of drummer Sean McGuinness, who attended Lower Merion High School in Ardmore, Pennsylvania.. The band initially planned to use the name Unrequited Hard-On before ultimately settling on Pissed Jeans. As Matt Korvette explains,

The idea was to start a different kinda punk band focused on dead ended carnal cravings, sexual depression...that sort of thing. Mainly we just wanted to bludgeon the listener with dull, monotonous droning rock music that just sucks the energy out of you, the musical equivalent to watching a toilet flush.

Pissed Jeans released its debut, Shallow, in 2005 on Parts Unknown Records. This was followed by Hope for Men (2007), King of Jeans (2009) and Honeys (2013), all released on Sub Pop Records.

The New York Times wrote that the band was "bring(ing) back '80s memories of hard, slovenly noise, when punk bands realized they could slow down and let their music fall apart a bit"; however, the article also observed the "aggressive, nasty" reaction of attendees at a 2008 show, who evidently were unprepared for Pissed Jeans sonics. The concert goers "started to huddle defensively on the sides," with "the columns of speakers on either side of the band...being used as something to hold on to. Average hipsters started to look like sailors clinging to a mast in a storm," The New York Times reported.

Their album Honeys was released in February 2013. AllMusic noted that "Fortunately, when the world has you feeling trapped, Pissed Jeans are there to help you rage out for a bit while you find some perspective."

In March 2013, Pissed Jeans was named one of Fuse TV's 30 must-see artists at SXSW.

Pissed Jeans' fifth album Why Love Now was released in February 2017.

On January 8, 2024, the band announced their sixth album, Half Divorced. The album was released on March 1 by Sub Pop.

== Influences and legacy ==
Pissed Jeans have cited influences including Brainbombs, Flipper, Black Flag, the Jesus Lizard, the Birthday Party, Nirvana, Stick Men with Ray Guns, the Crucifucks, Fang, X, Green Day, Rage Against the Machine, Wolf Eyes, Geto Boys and Too Short.

They have been cited as an influence by Blacklisters, Black Moth, Gilla Band, Ditz and Amyl and the Sniffers.

== Discography ==
=== Albums ===
- Shallow (Parts Unknown, 2005)
- Hope for Men (Sub Pop, 2007)
- King of Jeans (Sub Pop, 2009)
- Honeys (Sub Pop, 2013)
- Why Love Now (Sub Pop, 2017)
- Half Divorced (Sub Pop, 2024)

=== EPs ===
- Throbbing Organ/Night Minutes (Parts Unknown, 2004)
- Don't Need Smoke to Make Myself Disappear/Love Clown (Sub Pop, 2006)
- Sam Kinison Woman/The L Word (Sub Pop, 2010)
