= I've Felt Better =

Studio album by Dinosaur Pile-Up
- Released: 22 August 2025
- Length: 39:09
- Label: Mascot
- Producer: Matt Bigland; Larry Hibbitt; Mike Horner; Martin Terefe; Scott Stevens

Dinosaur Pile-Up chronology
Celebrity Mansions (2019)	I've Felt Better (2025)

Singles from I've Felt Better
- 1. "'Bout to Lose It" Released: 13 March 2025; 2. "My Way" Released: 12 April 2025; 3. "Sick of Being Down" Released: 19 June 2025

I've Felt Better is the fifth studio album by the English alternative rock band Dinosaur Pile-Up. It was released on 22 August 2025, via Mascot Records digitally.

== Background ==
The first album by the band in six years since Celebrity Mansions in 2019, I've Felt Better consists of twelve songs."'Bout to Lose It" was released on 13 March 2025 as the lead single. "My Way" was released as the second single on 12 April 2025. "Sick of Being Down" followed as the third single on 19 June 2025.

== Reception ==
Professional ratings
Review scores
Source	Rating
The Arts Desk	3/5 stars
Clash	7/10
Kerrang!	4/5

Kerrang!'s James Hickie, rating the album four out of five and comparing it with the band's previous releases, noted "It's hard to say, given the high standard they've always maintained, though the experience and depth it brings to a band who've never had a problem penning rock bangers may just edge it into first place."

The album received a three-star rating from the Arts Desk, whose reviewer Thomas Green stated, "And there's a load more of Dinosaur Pile-Up's well-honed, easy-going good time. 12 songs in 40 minutes. Indeed, it picks up where they left off. One can only hope their fans do too." Writing for Clash, Paulina Subia described it as "a joyous listen" and noted, "Even when it favors melancholy, each song is performed with a spirited energy that proves irresistible to sing along to."

== Track listing ==
All lyrics are written by Matt Bigland; all music is composed by Bigland, except where noted.

I've Felt Better track listing
No.	Title	Music	Producer(s)	Length
1.	"'Bout to Lose It"		Matt Bigland; Larry Hibbitt	3:41
2.	"I've Felt Better"		Bigland; Martin Terefe	2:53
3.	"Punk Kiss"		Bigland; Hibbitt	2:56
4.	"Sick of Being Down"		Bigland; Terefe	3:24
5.	"My Way"		Bigland; Hibbitt	3:24
6.	"Big Dogs"		Bigland; Hibbitt	2:44
7.	"Big You and Me"		Bigland; Hibbitt	2:55
8.	"Love's the Worst"	Bigland; Scott Stevens	Bigland; Mike Horner; Stevens	2:47
9.	"Quasimodo Melonheart"	Bigland; Blair Daly; Marti Frederiksen; Zac Maloy; Stevens	Bigland; Horner; Stevens	3:53
10.	"Sunflower"		Bigland; Horner	3:59
11.	"Unfamiliar"		Bigland; Hibbitt	3:33
12.	"I Don't Love Nothing and Nothing Loves Me"		Bigland; Terefe	3:00
Total length:				39:09

== Personnel ==
Credits adapted from Tidal.

=== Dinosaur Pile-Up ===
- Matt Bigland – vocals, guitar
- Jim Cratchley – bass guitar
- Mike Sheils – drums

=== Additional contributors ===
- Mike Horner – mixing (all tracks), programming (1, 2, 4), engineering (1, 2), vocals (9)
- Robin Schmidt – mastering
- Larry Hibbitt – guitar, keyboards, percussion (tracks 1, 3, 5–7, 10); engineering (1, 3), vocals (6, 7, 10)
- Karen Dió – vocals (6, 9)
- Oliver Bailey – vocals (6)
- Scott Stevens – vocals (8, 9), guitar (8)

== Charts ==
Chart performance for I've Felt Better
Chart (2025)	Peak position
UK Albums Sales (OCC)	79
UK Independent Albums (OCC)	28
UK Rock & Metal Albums (OCC)	13
