= Hawk Eyes =

English rock band

- Also known as: Chickenhawk (2004–2011)
- Origin: Leeds, West Yorkshire, UK
- Genres: Alternative metal; progressive rock; math rock; stoner rock; noise rock; hardcore punk (early)
- Years active: 2004–2015; 2019
- Labels: New Damage, Fierce Panda, Sound Devastation, Brew, Dance to the Radio
- Past members: Paul Michael Astick; Robert James Stephens; Ryan Thomas Clark; Mathew Graham John Reid; Steve Wilson; John MacKenzie

Hawk Eyes (formerly Chickenhawk) was an English rock band from Leeds, formed in 2004 and released their debut album Modern Bodies on 1 November 2010 through Brew Records.

== History ==
=== Early years (2004–2009) ===
Paul Michael Astick met Ryan Thomas Clark upon moving to Leeds. At the time, Clark was busy in a hardcore punk, but Astick was unable to find anybody else willing to start a band with him due to being a geek. In a 2012 interview, Astick said this difficult experience led the band to be a "band that hated everybody". They took the name "Chickenhawk" in reference to Robert Mason's 1983 novel of the same name.

The band played a part in the Leeds underground DIY metal and hardcore scene. They released their first demo in 2005. Some small CD splits and self-released CD-r's appeared during this time, all recorded with Ross Halden in his home basement studio Ghost Town Studios. Following years of house shows, small releases and self-organised tours, Brew Records picked up on the band and included them on their first release in 2007, a compilation entitled Volume 1 featuring other local bands part of the same DIY scene. This was to become a much stronger relationship as time passed. The band next decided to make an album of all the material they had to date and recorded it in sessions between Chris Fielding at Foel Studio in Wales and Jason Sanderson in Barnsley. Nottingham based label Sound Devastation released the self-titled debut on a limited run in 2008 and soon after Reid joined the band to complete the line-up and continue touring. The album and compilation both received great praise from the press. In mid-2008, the band decided to film their first music video for the track 'NASA Vs ESA' (taken from the self-titled debut) and shortly after its release local Leeds label Brew Records, offered to add Hawk Eyes to their growing roster (I Concur, Kong, These Monsters, Castrovalva). They saw the year out with further touring and writing.

=== A. Or Not? and Modern Bodies (2009–2011) ===
In March 2009, they returned to Jason Sanderson's studio to record their first material with latest member Reid. An EP entitled A. Or Not? (named after a close friend/promoter), and in support of the EP's release, they produced their second video for the track "I Hate This, Do You Like It?" in collaboration with the NME and SPIN magazine photographer Danny North. The EP was released in the late summer of 2009 following Hawk Eyes' first festival appearance on the BBC Introducing stage at the Leeds and Reading festivals and a UK tour with label mates Kong. At this point another Leeds independent label Dance To The Radio, asked the band to contribute a track towards their '4 X 12' series'. The track used was called Scorpieau - recorded by old friend Ross Halden at his newly located penthouse Ghost Town Studios mark II. Both the EP and the 12" split received positive national recognition. They closed the year off with their largest tour to date supporting US outfit the Fall of Troy across the UK.

Hawk Eyes started the year 2010 touring with The Computers and Outcry Collective, and were invited by Mike Davies to record at BBC's Maida Vale Studio in London for the Radio 1 punk rock show during the tour. The band played over 10 festivals across the country including Leeds & Reading, Hevy Festival and Sonisphere. Brew then released Modern Bodies, a selection of songs taken from previous limited releases, collected together on one new album. Remixed By Kevin Vanbergen, remastered and featuring brand new artwork by Reid and North. The album received critical acclaim worldwide. A UK tour supporting We Are the Ocean and a UK/European tour supporting Alexisonfire followed with positive reviews. They performed at Kendal Calling 2010.

=== Name change, Ideas and Everything is Fine (2011–2014) ===
On 8 March 2011, Chickenhawk changed their name to Hawk Eyes, due to other bands having similar names and the band being ridiculed for their use of "chicken". On 21 November, they released a single "Crack Another One", announcing it would be a part of the EP Mindhammers. Between January and October the band recorded the follow-up releases, Mindhammers and Ideas. During November Hawk Eyes toured the UK with Turbowolf and The JCQ. In December, Hawk Eyes toured as main support for Ginger Wildheart. On 12 December, Hawk Eyes released Mindhammers, a 5 track EP available by download and on limited 10" vinyl.

Hawk Eyes released Ideas on 21 March 2012 through Vinyl Junkie in Japan and 26 March 2012 on Fierce Panda in the UK. It was revealed that their drummer Matt Reid had left the band and that Steve Wilson, the former drummer of Japanese Voyeurs and Dinosaur Pile-Up, had joined the band. During 2012 Hawk Eyes toured extensively throughout the UK, Europe and Japan. Ideas received high praise from the rock press including 5Ks in Kerrang, being nominated for Best Newcomer at 2012's Kerrang awards. Whilst still touring, Hawk Eyes released a new EP in 2013 titled That's What This Is via Pledgemusic. It received a four-star rating from DIY Magazine. The band also commenced writing & recording a new album.

In 2014, the band continued to record their third album with producer Andy Hawkins. The new album 'Everything is Fine' will be released in February 2015, pre sale being announced in October 2014. They also announced a 9 date UK tour for February. Lead single 'Die Trying' is released in November, having been premiered on Dan Carter's Radio 1 rock show. On 31 May 2014, they performed at Camden Rocks Festival.

=== Hiatuses and Advice (2015–present) ===
The band entered a period of inactivity around 2015, ending in 2019, with the announcement of their album Advice. In 2023, the band posted on Facebook that they had been inactive since 2019, stating "occasionally we get a nice message asking if we're still a band. The truthful answer is that we have never said never - just not now. In other words, it's unlikely that we will be doing anything as band in the foreseeable future. " Reid founded Endless Hum promotions.

== Musical style and influences ==
Critics have categorised Hawk Eyes' music as progressive rock, stoner rock, noise rock, math rock and alternative metal.

Their work when named Chickenhawk was hardcore punk. Following a medical incident, Astick stopped screaming around the time they changed their name. In a 2013 interview, the band also attributed the sound change on That is What This is to the addition of Steve Wilson, with Stephens stating "Matt was much more of an up tempo aggressive drummer, Steve is much more groove based, it was something we wanted to explore more".

DIY called them the "heavier cousins" of Dinosaur Pile-Up and Pulled Apart By Horses. Writing for NME, Abby Tayleure described Hawk Eyes and Pulled Apart By Horses as a part of "the 'spit in your face and scream in your throat' sweaty school of rock." Counterfeit described them as "mixing hardcore riffs with some Rolo Tomassi-esque soft, keyboard-led breakdowns". Their music contrasts heavy riffs with soft, math rock arpeggios.

Hawk Eyes cited influences including the Melvins, Danny Elfman, Django Reinhardt, the Dillinger Escape Plan, Dream Theater, Shellac, Neurosis, Cursed, St. Vincent, Smashing Pumpkins, Led Zeppelin, Black Sabbath, Electric Wizard, Uncle Acid & the Deadbeats, Fu Manchu, Red Fang, Smoke and Smoke, godheadSilo, Serpentine Path, Unearthly Trance, Shooting Guns, Brant Bjork, Turbonegro, the Hellacopters, Biters, Ty Segall, Dinosaur Jr., Unsane, Tomahawk, Helmet, Metallica, Motörhead, Iron Maiden, Thin Lizzy, AC/DC, Alice Cooper, Kiss, Kvelertak and Swans. Stephens has cited his guitar influences as including Buckethead, Billy Corgan of Smashing Pumpkins, Omar Rodríguez López of At the Drive-In and Mars Volta, Robert Fripp from King Crimson and John Petrucci of Dream Theatre.

On Advice, they were influenced by the Foo Fighters, Fugazi and A Perfect Circle.

They have been cited as an influence by Blacklisters, Vessels and Heck. They have been cited as a favourite by While She Sleeps and Haggard Cat.

== Members ==
- Paul Michael Astick – vocals (2004–2019), drums (2004–2008), guitar (2008–2019)
- Robert James Stephens – guitar (2004–2019)
- Ryan Thomas Clark – bass (2004–2019)
- Mathew Graham John Reid – drums (2008–2012)
- Steve Wilson – drums (2012-2015)
- John MacKenzie – drums (2015–2019)

== Discography ==
=== Studio albums ===
- Modern Bodies (2010, CD digipak)
- Ideas (2012)
- Everything Is Fine (2015)
- Advice (2019)

=== EPs ===
- A or Not? (2009, enhanced CD digipak)
- Mindhammers (2011, vinyl + download)
- That's What This Is

=== Demos ===
- 2005 - CD

=== Split releases ===
- "I Breathe Spears"/"With Scissors Split" (2006, CD)
- "Hawk Eyes"/"Castrovalva"/"Dolphins"/"Blacklisters" (2011, 10" vinyl)

=== Compilation appearances ===
- Salt the Wound Records - The Sky Is Bleeding (2007, CD)
- Dance to the Radio - 4x12" Vol 3 (2009, 12" vinyl)
- Exploding in Sound - Battery Acid Audio (2011, free download)
