= Half Divorced =

Studio album by Pissed Jeans
- Released: March 1, 2024
- Recorded: March–June 2023
- Studio: Tonal Park, Takoma Park, Maryland
- Length: 30:08
- Label: Sub Pop
- Producer: Pissed Jeans; Dan Godwin

Pissed Jeans chronology
| Why Love Now (2017) | Half Divorced (2024) |

Singles from Half Divorced
- 1. "Moving On" Released: January 8, 2024

Half Divorced is the sixth studio album by American hardcore punk band Pissed Jeans, released on March 1, 2024, through Sub Pop. It is their first album in seven years, following 2017's Why Love Now. The album was produced by the band with Dan Godwin, and was preceded by the lead single "Moving On", released alongside the album announcement on January 8.

== Background and recording ==
The band recorded the album at Tonal Park in Takoma Park, Maryland. Singer Matt Korvette stated that "Half Divorced has an aggression within it, in terms of saying, 'I don't want this reality'. There's a power in being able to say, 'I realize you want me to pay attention to these things, but I'm telling you that they don't matter.' I'm already looking elsewhere."

== Critical reception ==
Professional ratings
Aggregate scores
| Source | Rating |
|---|---|
| Metacritic | 84/100 |
Review scores
| Source | Rating |
| Kerrang! | 4/5 |
| Mojo | 4/5 stars |
| Uncut | 8/10 |

Half Divorced received a score of 84 out of 100 on review aggregator Metacritic based on four critics' reviews, indicating "universal acclaim". Stereogum gave the album their "Album of the Week" designation, with the website's Tom Breihan writing that "much of Half Divorced is as surly and mean as everything else in the band's catalog" and calling it "some real prime '90s sludge ugliness". Uncut wrote that "Matt Korvette is a misanthropic force of nature whether ticking off the negatives of cities from Boston to Rome ('Everywhere Is Bad') or addressing adult responsibility ('Helicopter Parent')". Mojo felt that "Pissed Jeans' fist-pumping tunes, thrilling noise and acidic wit ensure their permanent bummer is always a good time".

Olly Thomas of Kerrang! opined that "this time round, Pissed Jeans have pushed their typical pace from slurred sludge into hardcore territory" and concluded, "this fantastically punchy piece of work is so much more fun than you'd expect from anybody's sixth album". Reviewing the album for The Quietus, Jon Buckland found it to be "packed full of pep", writing that "Seatbelt Alarm Silencer" is "a ramshackle speed race in constant danger of tripping over itself whilst the Philadelphians skate their closest yet to NOFX-style belters on both 'Cling to a Poisoned Dream' and the Pink Lincolns cover, 'Monsters'. Similarly, opener 'Killing All the Wrong People' sets the tone in both bludgeoning buzzsaw energy and as a conduit for their upturned world view".

== Track listing ==
All lyrics are written by Matt Korvette; all music is composed by Pissed Jeans, except "Monsters", with lyrics and music by Marshall Dickson.

Half Divorced track listing
| No. | Title | Length |
|---|---|---|
| 1. | "Killing All the Wrong People" | 2:19 |
| 2. | "Anti-Sapio" | 1:40 |
| 3. | "Helicopter Parent" | 2:54 |
| 4. | "Cling to a Poisoned Dream" | 1:29 |
| 5. | "Sixty-Two Thousand Dollars in Debt" | 1:54 |
| 6. | "Everywhere Is Bad" | 3:35 |
| 7. | "Junktime" | 5:31 |
| 8. | "Alive with Hate" | 1:36 |
| 9. | "Seatbelt Alarm Silencer" | 1:27 |
| 10. | "(Stolen) Catalytic Converter" | 1:51 |
| 11. | "Monsters" | 1:24 |
| 12. | "Moving On" | 4:28 |
| Total length: | | 30:08 |

== Personnel ==
Pissed Jeans

- Bradley Fry – all guitars, production, mixing, art direction, design
- Randall Huth – bass guitar, production, mixing, art direction, design
- Matt Korvette – vocals, production, mixing, art direction, design
- Sean McGuinness – drums, percussion, production, mixing, art direction, design

Additional contributors

- Don Godwin – production, mixing, engineering
- Arthur Rizk – mastering
- Mike Petillo – engineering
- Kento Iida – artwork
- Dusty Summers – art direction, design
- Ebru Yildiz – portraits
- Mary Regalado – additional vocals on "Seatbelt Alarm Silencer"

== Charts ==
Chart performance for Half Divorced
| Chart (2024) | Peak position |
|---|---|
| Australian Digital Albums (ARIA) | 42 |
| UK Album Downloads (OCC) | 93 |
| UK Independent Albums (OCC) | 30 |
| UK Rock & Metal Albums (OCC) | 13 |
