= Hope for Men =

Studio album by Pissed Jeans
- Released: June 5, 2007
- Genre: Hardcore punk, noise rock, grunge
- Length: 41:39
- Label: Sub Pop

Pissed Jeans chronology
Shallow (2005)	Hope for Men (2007)	King of Jeans (2009)

Professional ratings
Review scores
Source	Rating
AllMusic	2.5/5 stars
Drowned in Sound	8/10
Pitchfork	8.1/10
Tiny Mix Tapes	4/5 stars

Hope for Men is the second studio album by Pissed Jeans. The lyrics of many of the songs are about very mundane subjects, such as eating ice cream and scrapbooking, in sharp contrast to the frenzied vocals and loud, off-key instrumentals. The tracks "Scrapbooking" and "The Jogger" are essentially spoken-word tracks, the latter with a crashing guitar backdrop.

== Track listing ==
1. "People Person" – 4:58
2. "Secret Admirer" – 3:27
3. "A Bad Wind" – 3:06
4. "Scrapbooking" – 5:13
5. "I've Still Got You (Ice Cream)" – 3:07
6. "Fantasy World" – 3:38
7. "I'm Turning Now" – 3:20
8. "Caught Licking Leather" – 3:58
9. "The Jogger" – 3:10
10. "My Bed" – 7:42
