= King of Jeans =

Studio album by Pissed Jeans
- Released: September 18, 2009
- Genre: Hardcore punk, noise rock
- Length: 39:36
- Label: Sub Pop
- Producer: Alex Newport

Pissed Jeans chronology
Hope for Men (2007)	King of Jeans (2009)	Honeys (2013)

Professional ratings
Aggregate scores
Source	Rating
AnyDecentMusic?	7.7/10
Metacritic	82/100
Review scores
Source	Rating
AllMusic	3/5 stars
Alternative Press	4/5 stars
The A.V. Club	A−
Drowned in Sound	9/10
Mojo	4/5 stars
MusicOMH	4/5 stars
NME	4/5 stars
Pitchfork	8.3/10
PopMatters	8/10
Slant Magazine	3/5 stars

King of Jeans is the third studio album by noise rock/hardcore punk band Pissed Jeans, released on September 18, 2009. It is their second album for Sub Pop Records, and their first album working with English producer Alex Newport. Like most of the band's releases, the album features banal lyrics and atonal and abrasive guitar rock. It has been well received by critics.

== Track listing ==
1. "False Jesii Part 2" – 2:34
2. "Half Idiot" – 2:33
3. "Dream Smotherer" – 4:21
4. "Pleasure Race" – 2:11
5. "She Is Science Fiction" – 2:09
6. "Request for Masseuse" – 2:46
7. "Human Upskirt" – 2:11
8. "Lip Ring" – 3:03
9. "Spent" – 7:32
10. "R-Rated Movie" – 3:01
11. "Dominate Yourself" – 3:14
12. "Goodbye (Hair)" – 4:00
