= Why Love Now =

Studio album by Pissed Jeans
- Released: February 16, 2017
- Studio: Spice House Sound, Philadelphia
- Genre: Post-punk; heavy metal; noise punk; hardcore punk
- Length: 37:06
- Label: Sub Pop
- Producer: Pissed Jeans; Lydia Lunch; Arthur Rizk

Pissed Jeans chronology
| Honeys (2013) | Why Love Now (2017) | Half Divorced (2024) |

Singles from Why Love Now
- 1. "The Bar is Low" Released: November 15, 2016; 2. "Ignorecam" Released: January 11, 2017

Why Love Now is the fifth studio album by American hardcore punk band Pissed Jeans, debuting via streaming on February 16, 2017 through Noisey and released to other formats by Sub Pop on February 24. The album covers issues related to gender relations, misogyny, and white male privilege, one critic labeling it as "preëmptive self-critique, an attempt to defang male aggression by letting it feed on itself." The band produced Why Love Now with no wave artist Lydia Lunch, who strictly controlled how the group worked on the record, and metal musician Arthur Rizk, who handled the technical aspects. Why Love Now was positively received by critics, who praised its use of uncomfortable lyrical themes, and landed at number 24 on the American Billboard Heatseekers Albums chart.

== Production ==
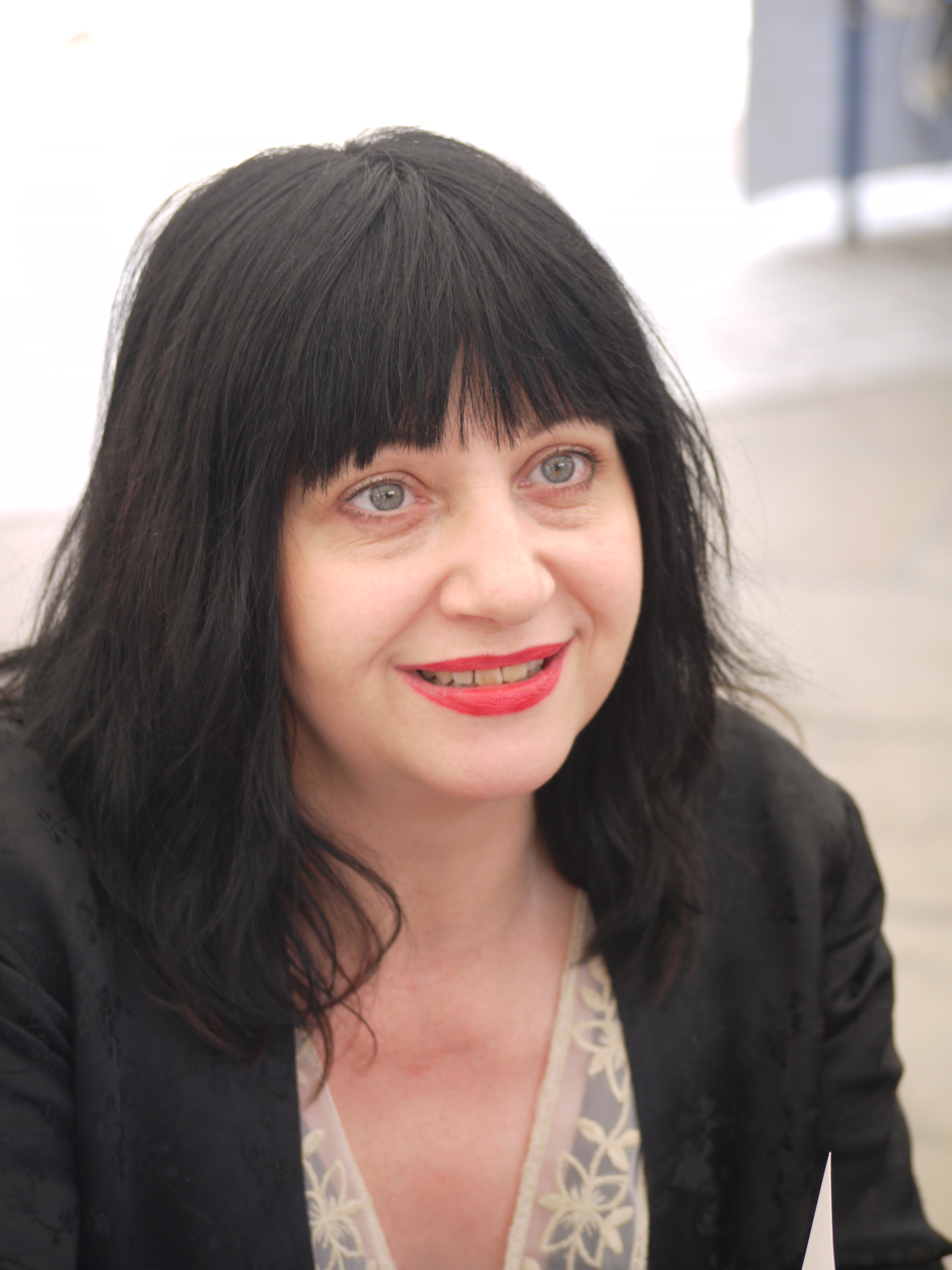
No wave artist Lydia Lunch was one of the producers on Why Love Now.

Two people handled the production of Why Love Now: metal musician Arthur Rizk was responsible for the technical aspects, and No wave singer Lydia Lunch controlled the behavior of the band as well as contributed to the feminine undertones of the album's themes. As Lunch recalled her time being contacted by the group to contribute to the album, "My first question was, 'What's the lyrical content?' Matt told me, 'I have a song about women getting paid to ignore men on the Internet.' Then I was like, 'Yeah? I'm in!" Lunch was very strict towards the band, which singer Matt Korvette praised: "I knew she wasn’t a traditional producer. I like how she’s so cool and really intimidating. She ended up being so fucking awesome and crazy. She was super into it, constantly threatening to bend us over the bathtub."

== Composition ==
Sub Pop's press release states the lyrics of Why Love Now are about the "mundane discomforts of modern life" and "the bursting seams that are barely holding 21st-century life together." A major theme is problems resulting from gender relations, misogyny, and white male privilege. Writer Dan Piepenbring categorized the album as a "preëmptive self-critique, an attempt to defang male aggression by letting it feed on itself." While themes of male privilege existed on previous Pissed Jeans albums, they're the "deepest" on Why Love Now, wrote Pitchfork's Evan Rytlewski. Rytlewski also analyzed the lyrics occasionally goes into "Korvette’s usual digressions" such as "sugary snacks, laugh-tracked sitcoms, astrology, and the like" in order to "balance" the album's tone. The LP also features the same type of workplace commentary as on the band's previous album Honeys (2013), such as on the song "Have You Ever Been Furniture?," which lambasts "menial, underappreciated jobs," PopMatters stated. Musically, Why Love Now is the most high fidelity and melodic release in Pissed Jeans' discography, one critic noting that it would be "virtually unidentifiable as a Pissed Jeans [album] if not for Korvette’s phlegmy ogre routine."

Novelist Lindsay Hunter appears on the spoken word track "I'm A Man" to deliver an office-based discussion involving innuendo spoken through objects such as pens and coffee. Korvette became friends with Hunter after she mentioned the Pissed Jeans song "False Jesii Part 2" in a Fanzine interview. He was shocked by Hunter's writing for the song, reasoning that it was about a "plausible, real person" rather than "a ghoul that does sickening, gory things." He said in an interview with Noisey, "Even when I heard it for the first time I was totally cringing and running down the list of descriptions she had for this character that I'm like "fuck, I've probably done that." "Not Even Married" is Korvette's "response" to "regular" men in their mid-20s getting depressed after breaking up. Korvette said in regards to his inspiration of the song, "You don't know what you're talking about till you sell your house and living above a bar trying to see your kids on weekends."

"It’s Your Knees" criticizes males who make fun of the anxiety of other women. "Ignorecam" is about a man who gets pleasure from a webcam model's lack of interest in him. "Love Without Emotion" regards males who are callous to females, Korvette singing, "You’re vomiting next to me / While I finish my ice cream." "Cold Whip Cream" is about "the pressures of being straight," a commentary on the fears of men that come with their sexual attraction: "Nervous and excited with all these thoughts / Lying awake in bed / Ever since a teen wondering when you’d finally catch a smell / But what if you go to hell?" "The Bar Is Low" criticizes systems that honor all males for doing everything, even the smallest of things: "You haven’t climbed a mountain / Barely walked up a hill / But that’s good as gold / ’Cause you’ve never killed / Held down a job / Even snagged a raise / Right there you’re due for / Effusive praise."

== Release and promotion ==
Two singles were released from Why Love Now: "The Bar is Low" on November 15, 2016 and "Ignorecam" on January 11, 2017. Noisey premiered the album via streaming on February 16, 2017 before Sub Pop issued it to other formats (Compact disc, digital, cassette tape, and vinyl) on February 24. A music video for "The Bar is Low" was released the same day. Directed by Joe Stakun, who previously directed videos for other Pissed Jeans songs such as "Bathroom Laughter" and "Romanticize Me," the video is a "clinic on all the things not to do at the gym," Billboard summarized. A five-show tour supporting it lasted from February 23 to March 11, 2017, shows located in Philadelphia, Brooklyn, Washington, D.C., and Somerville, Massachusetts.

== Critical reception ==
Professional ratings
Aggregate scores
| Source | Rating |
|---|---|
| AnyDecentMusic? | 7.3/10 |
| Metacritic | 76/100 |
Review scores
| Source | Rating |
| AllMusic | 3.5/5 stars |
| Classic Rock | 3/5 stars |
| Drowned in Sound | 9/10 |
| The Guardian | 4/5 stars |
| Magnet | 8/10 stars |
| Mojo | 3/5 stars |
| The Observer | 4/5 stars |
| Pitchfork | 7.9/10 |
| PopMatters | 7/10 |

Drowned in Sound called Why Love Now a "glorious, if uncomfortable, masterpiece." The Line of Best Fit stated that it was a "tour de force of high octane refrains and filth-driven focus," "lay[s] waste to rationalisation and set[s] standards straight." Spin magazine opined it "furthers the argument for Pissed Jeans as one of our era’s best punk bands," praising the group's experimentation with their sound and Korvette's panache method of delivering the lyrical themes: "By sending up everyday drudgery and casual cruelty with such inimitable style, the band offers an alternative to lowering your head and grinding through each day until you wake up one morning without a soul." Paul Carr, in a PopMatters review, praised Korvette's "harsh, wild man howl and caustic wit," claiming "he is in inspired form throughout with lines begging to be unpacked over time." He also applauded the increased flexibility in the group's sound. DIY magazine noted the "united sense of purpose" from all members of the group: "Each has their individual moments to shine, but all seem united and firmly committed to the common cause of rallying against the kind of masculinity that it seems absurd we still need to oppose in 2017."

A common praise was Why Love Now's uncomfortable subject matter. Critic Josh Gray humorously called it a "brash ballache of an album that will make you hate yourself as much as it makes you hate the world." Gray also noted how "truly terrifying" the LP was in that some of its disturbing lyrics are "familiar" in the real world. Rolling Stone claimed, "Whereas yesterday's shock-jock punks provoked show-goers with SS garb and imagery, or seasoned their lyrics with racial slurs and homicidal fantasies, Korvette has crafted a remarkably different kind of strategy for startling his audiences: making men like himself seem insignificant – or at least gruelingly self-aware – in the spaces they once dominated." On Louder Than War's list of the 100 best albums of 2017, Why Love Now placed number 24.

== Track listing ==
Why Love Now track listing
| No. | Title | Length |
|---|---|---|
| 1. | "Waiting On My Horrible Warning" | 4:16 |
| 2. | "The Bar Is Low" | 3:15 |
| 3. | "Ignorecam" | 2:58 |
| 4. | "Cold Whip Cream" | 2:36 |
| 5. | "Love Without Emotion" | 4:00 |
| 6. | "I'm a Man" | 2:39 |
| 7. | "(Won't Tell You) My Sign" | 2:43 |
| 8. | "It's Your Knees" | 3:33 |
| 9. | "Worldwide Marine Asset Financial Analyst" | 1:26 |
| 10. | "Have You Ever Been Furniture" | 2:38 |
| 11. | "Activia" | 4:27 |
| 12. | "Not Even Married" | 2:35 |
| Total length: | | 37:06 |

== Personnel ==
Music

- Produced at Spice House Sound in Philadelphia by Pissed Jeans, Lydia Lunch, and Arthur Rizk
- Engineered by Arthur Rizk
- Vocals by Matt Korvette
- Guitar by Bradley Fry
- Bass and keyboards on "Waiting On My Horrible Warning" by Randy Huth
- Percussion by Sean Mcguinness
- Vocals on "Waiting On My Horrible Warning" by Mary Lattimore
- "I'm a Man" written, produced, and recorded by Lindsay Hunter (lyrics) and Sean Mcguinness (music)

Artwork

- Direction by Dusty Summers and Matt Korvette
- Photography by Gene Smirnov
- Image editing by Hungman Ma
- Additional work by Derek Erdman

== Charts ==
Chart performance for Why Love Now
| Chart (2017) | Peak position |
|---|---|
| US Heatseekers Albums (Billboard) | 24 |

== Release history ==
Release history and formats for Why Love Now
| Region | Date | Format(s) | Label |
|---|---|---|---|
| Worldwide | February 16, 2017 | Streaming | Noisey |
| Worldwide | February 24, 2017 | Cassette; CD; digital download; vinyl | Sub Pop |
