= Japanese Voyeurs =

English rock band

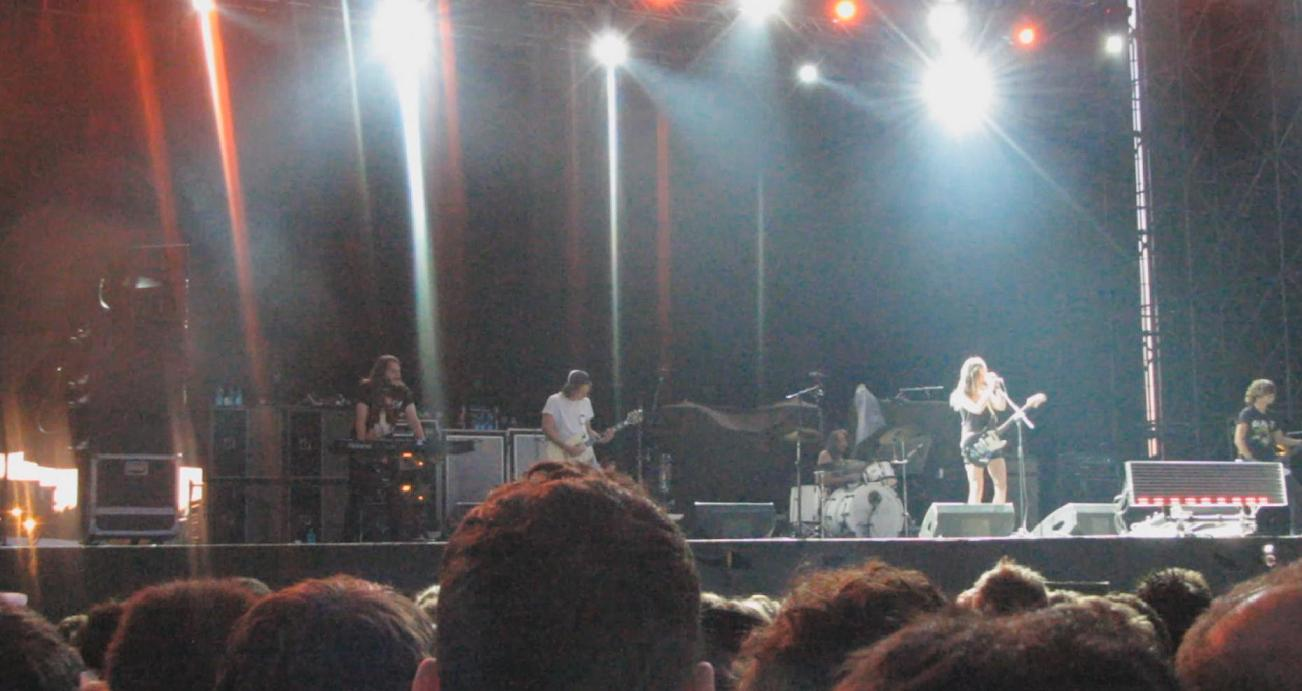
- Japanese Voyeurs in 2011

Background information
- Origin: London, England
- Genres: Grunge; alternative metal
- Years active: 2007–2012
- Past members: Romily Alice; Johnny Seymour; Tom Lamb; Rikki Waldron; Steve Wilson

Japanese Voyeurs were a British band from London, England. Formed in 2007 by Romily Alice (vocals/guitar), Rikki Waldron (keyboard), Johnny Seymour (bass) and Tom Lamb (guitar), they were joined by Steve Wilson (drums) in 2009. They were one of the most prominent bands in Britain's late 2000s and early 2010s grunge revival. They released their debut EP Sicking and Creaming in 2009, followed by their 2011 full-length Yolk. They disbanded on 8 March 2012, citing financial issues.

== History ==
Japanese Voyeurs formed in 2007. It founders Romily Alice (vocals/guitar), Rikki Waldron (keyboard) attended school together and were introduced to Johnny Seymour (bass) and Tom Lamb (guitar) by a mutual friend. Early on, the band performed alongside Dinosaur Pile Up, whose member Steve Wilson joined Japanese Voyeurs as drummer in 2009. In October 2009, they toured the United Kingdom, supporting Johnny Foreigner, alongside Tellison. The band's first release was Sicking and Creaming, a 2009 EP. On 18 December 2010, they released the double A-side of "That Love Sound" and "Blush".

In March 2011, they flew to Vancouver, British Columbia, Canada, to record their debut album, Yolk, with Garth Richardson. They released Yolk on 11 July 2011. In July 2011, they opened for Slash at a number of concerts. They performed at Download Festival 2010. In December 2010, they supported Young Guns on their UK tour. In February 2011, they toured the UK as a part of the Rock Sound Exposure tour alongside the Xcerts and Dinosaur Pile-up, rotating who headlines each night. They performed at the 2011 Camden Crawl.

On 8 March 2012, the band split up, stating on their Facebook page that 'we simply can't afford to keep doing the band'. Seymour went on to join Dinosaur Pile-Up, Wilson joined Hawk Eyes. and Alice became a visual artist.

== Musical style and influences ==
Critics have categorised Japanese Voyeurs' music as alternative metal and grunge. Drowned in Sound called them "spaz-grunge revival".

Alongside Dinosaur Pile-Up, the band were central to the British grunge revival of the late 2000s and early 2010s. In reference to the label Wilson stated "We’re obviously into all those bands but you just get labelled with the bloody grunge revivalist thing," while Lamb stated he accepts the "grunge metal" tag. Drowned in Sound called their instrumentals "textbook grunge-punk" but Romily's vocals turn them "into far more expressive beasts". The BBC compared their style to Nirvana and the Melvins, noting that they have "often been labelled grunge... that's not entirely accurate: there are heavier forces at work here, riffs and ideas from metal bands such as Pantera, Down". Clash called them "one of the most inventive and challenging bands of 2011". Soundsphere stated "they mix the schizophrenic and chaotic tones of Queenadreena with the Melvins' grunge stomp". The Guardian stated "[KatieJane] Garside [of Queenadreena and Daisy Chainsaw is Alice's most obvious forerunner. She has one of those... demented-ickle-gurl voices". They made use of fuzz distortion.

Japanese Voyeurs cited influences including Melvins, Tool, the Dillinger Escape Plan, Mogwai, Down, Pantera, Beyonce, Kyuss and the Jesus Lizard.

They have been cited as an influence by Milk Teeth, who took their name from the Japanese Voyeurs song of the same name.

== Band members ==
- Johnny Seymour – bass
- Rikki Waldron – keyboard
- Romily Alice – vocals, guitar
- Steve Wilson – drums
- Tom Lamb – guitar

== Discography ==
=== EPs ===
- Sicking and Creaming (2009)

=== Albums ===
- Yolk (2011)
- B-Sides and Rarities (2012)

=== Singles ===
- "Smother Me" (2010)
- "Milk Teeth" (2010)
- "That Love Sound" / "Blush" (2010)
- "Get Hole" (2011)
- "Cry Baby" (2011)
