= Nature Nurture =

Studio album by Dinosaur Pile-Up
- Released: 17 June 2013
- Recorded: Late 2012–early 2013
- Genres: Alternative rock, post-grunge, noise rock
- Label: SO Recordings
- Producers: James Kenosha, Matt Bigland, Kevin Vanbergen

Dinosaur Pile-Up chronology
Peninsula (2013)	Nature Nurture (2014)	11:11 (2015)

Singles from Nature Nurture
- 1. "Arizona Waiting" Released: 2013; 2. "Peninsula" Released: 2013

Alternative cover
- Japan Edition cover

Nature Nurture is the second studio album by British alternative rock band Dinosaur Pile-Up. The album was released on 17 June 2013 and 25 February 2014 in the United Kingdom and the United States, respectively. The album failed to chart in either of those countries. However, the band's newfound popularity in Japan, along with the release of the Peninsula EP by A-Sketch months prior to the album's 22 October 2014 release, saw it chart at #168 in the country. The single "Arizona Waiting" reached #68 on the Billboard Japan Radio Songs chart shortly after the album's release. A-Sketch also released two "Japan Limited" music videos, both consisting of live performance footage, for "Peninsula" and "Arizona Waiting."

The song "Peninsula" was the most played song on SiriusXM's Alt Nation channel for the week ending 27 February 2014.

The song "Draw A Line" was featured in the fifth episode of season 14 of Degrassi, in the scene where Eli punches Drew in the face.

== Critical reception ==
Professional ratings
Aggregate scores
Source	Rating
Metacritic	68/100
Review scores
Source	Rating
NME	6/10 stars
The 405	7.5/10
The Line of Best Fit	6.5/10 stars

Nature Nurture has received mostly positive. Metacritic, which assigns a normalized rating out of 100 to reviews from critics, gave the album an average score of 68, which indicates "generally positive reviews".

== Track listing ==
Standard edition
No.	Title	Length
1.	"Arizona Waiting"	3:04
2.	"Derail"	3:31
3.	"Peninsula"	3:31
4.	"Heather"	2:55
5.	"Summer Gurl"	2:40
6.	"White T-Shirt and Jeans"	3:14
7.	"The Way We Came"	3:23
8.	"Draw a Line"	2:55
9.	"Start Again"	2:56
10.	"Lip Hook Kiss"	3:39
11.	"Nature Nurture"	4:14
Total length:		34:02

iTunes version
No.	Title	Length
12.	"Bruise Violet"	2:53
13.	"Should"	3:31
Total length:		39:46

Japan Edition (Note: The digital copy contains only the first 11 tracks.)
No.	Title	Length
12.	"Bruise Violet"	2:53
13.	"Should"	3:31
14.	"Bella"	2:46
15.	"Hanging By A Thread"	3:35
16.	"You Drive Your Car"	3:28
17.	"In My Room"	3:20
