= Blacklisters =

English rock band

- Also known as: Blklstrs
- Origin: Leeds, West Yorkshire, UK
- Genres: Noise rock; math rock; hardcore punk; garage rock
- Years active: 2008–present
- Labels: Brew; Smalltown America; Childhoodsweetheart; British Wildlife; Best Enemies; Too Pure; Learning Curve
- Members: Billy Mason-Wood; Alistair Stobbart; Dan Beesley; Steve Hodson
- Past members: Owen Griffiths

Blacklisters (or Blklstrs) are an English rock band from Leeds, West Yorkshire. Formed in 2008 by vocalist Billy Mason-Wood, drummer Alistair Stobbart, guitarist Dan Beesley and bassist Owen Griffiths, they released their debut album Blklstrs in 2012. Alongside Hookworms, Hawk Eyes and Pulled Apart by Horses, they helped to establish a noise rock and garage punk scene that arose in Leeds, as a reaction against the commerciality of New Yorkshire. Their second album, Adult, was released in 2015. In 2017, Griffiths departed, replaced by Dan Beesley, who performed on their third album Fantastic Man (2020). Blacklisters slowed operations around 2021, during which time they released the Why Deny It EP in 2022 and This Is Not an Album compilation in 2024.

== History ==
Blacklisters' founding lineup was vocalist Billy Mason-Wood, drummer Alistair Stobbart, guitarist Dan Beesley and bassist Owen Griffiths. The band formed in 2008 in Hyde Park, Leeds over a shared love of Gang of Four and Devo. Began playing in the Leeds noise rock scene that also included Hawk Eyes, Kong and Pulled Apart by Horses. They released their debut single "Swords" in 2009, then their debut EP Belt Party in 2010. The band began to gain attention for their chaotic and aggressive live shows. They performed at Reading and Leeds Festivals 2010, then opened in 2011. In 2012, they toured with Japanese Voyeurs.

On 27 February 2012, they released the single "Trickfuck", announcing they'd signed to Brew Records, an important label for chaotic British bands, also signing Humanfly, Carnivores, USA Nails, Castrovalva, Holy State, I Concur and Negative Pegasus. Between 16 and 24 March, they headlined a tour of the UK. The band released their debut album Blklstrs on 30 April 2012. On 20 July 2015, they released the single "Shirts", accompanied by a music video directed by Tom Hudson and Tommy Davidson of Pulled Apart by Horses.

On 3 August, they released the single "I Knock Myself Out". They were both a part of their second album Adult released on 18 September. Between 18 September and 19 October, they headlined a tour of the United Kingdom. During November 2016, they supported Future of the Left. In 2017, USA Nails guitarist Steve Hodson joined as bassist, replacing Griffiths. On 8 September 2017, they released the single "Drag", announcing it would be a part of their EP Dart, which released on 29 September 2017. By 2018, Mason-Wood had relocated to Berlin.

Blacklisters released their third studio album, Fantastic Man, on 28 August 2020, their operations slowed around 2021. The band entered the studio in 2022, releasing the EP Why Deny It on 1 November of that year. They entered the studio again in 2023. Their first live performance in two years was at the 2023 Endless Hum Festival in Shipley. On 14 June 2024, they released the compilation album This Is Not an Album.

== Musical style ==
Critics have categorised Blacklisters' music as noise rock, math rock, hardcore punk, pigfuck and garage rock. They incorporate elements of post-rock, post-punk, sludge metal, doom metal and heavy metal.

Their music makes use of guitar feedback, screamed vocals, polyrhythms unorthodox time signatures, psychedelic rock-inspired instrumentals, tribal drum beats, lo-fi production and atmospheric parts driven by the bass. Their Basslines are often melodic and songs are often based around building tension. On Adult (2015), their structures became less erratic and more drawn out, with some of the songs pursuing a soft sound. On Leisure Centre (2022), they abandoned many of their hardcore-inspired elements. Punktastic writer Glen Bushell described their sound as "broken, ugly, and takes you back to the dissonance of Seattle in the early 90s". Echoes and Dust writer Jared Dix described it as "somewhere between USA Nails and Girl Band, with the obvious shared roots in Am Rep and post hardcore".

Blacklisters cite influences including Pulled Apart by Horses, Hawk Eyes, Rapeman, Slint, the Offspring, Pearl Jam, Nirvana, Queens of the Stone Age, Pink Rick, Super Luxury, Irk, Kong, the Melvins, the Jesus Lizard, Big Black, Shellac, Daughters, Pissed Jeans, Gang of Four, Devo, Battles, Liars and Morrissey.

=== Legacy ===
Alongside Hookworms, Eagulls and Broken Arm, Blacklisters helped to establish a noise rock and garage punk scene that arose in Leeds as a reaction against the commerciality of the city's indie rock bands like the Pigeon Detectives and Kaiser Chiefs. They were widely influential on the British underground. By 2023, Louder than War writer Andy Brown called them "noise rock heroes".

They have been cited as an influence by Ditz, Black Moth and Post War Glamour Girls.

== Members ==
Current

- Billy Mason-Wood – vocals (2008–present)
- Alistair Stobbart – drums (2008–present)
- Dan Beesley – guitar (2008–present)
- Steve Hodson – bass (2017–present)

Former

- Owen Griffiths – bass (2008–2017)

== Discography ==
Studio albums

- Blklstrs (2012)
- Adult (2015)
- Fantastic Man (2020)

EPs

- Belt Party (2010)
- Dart (2017)
- Leisure Centre (2022)
