= Bearfoot Beware =

English rock band

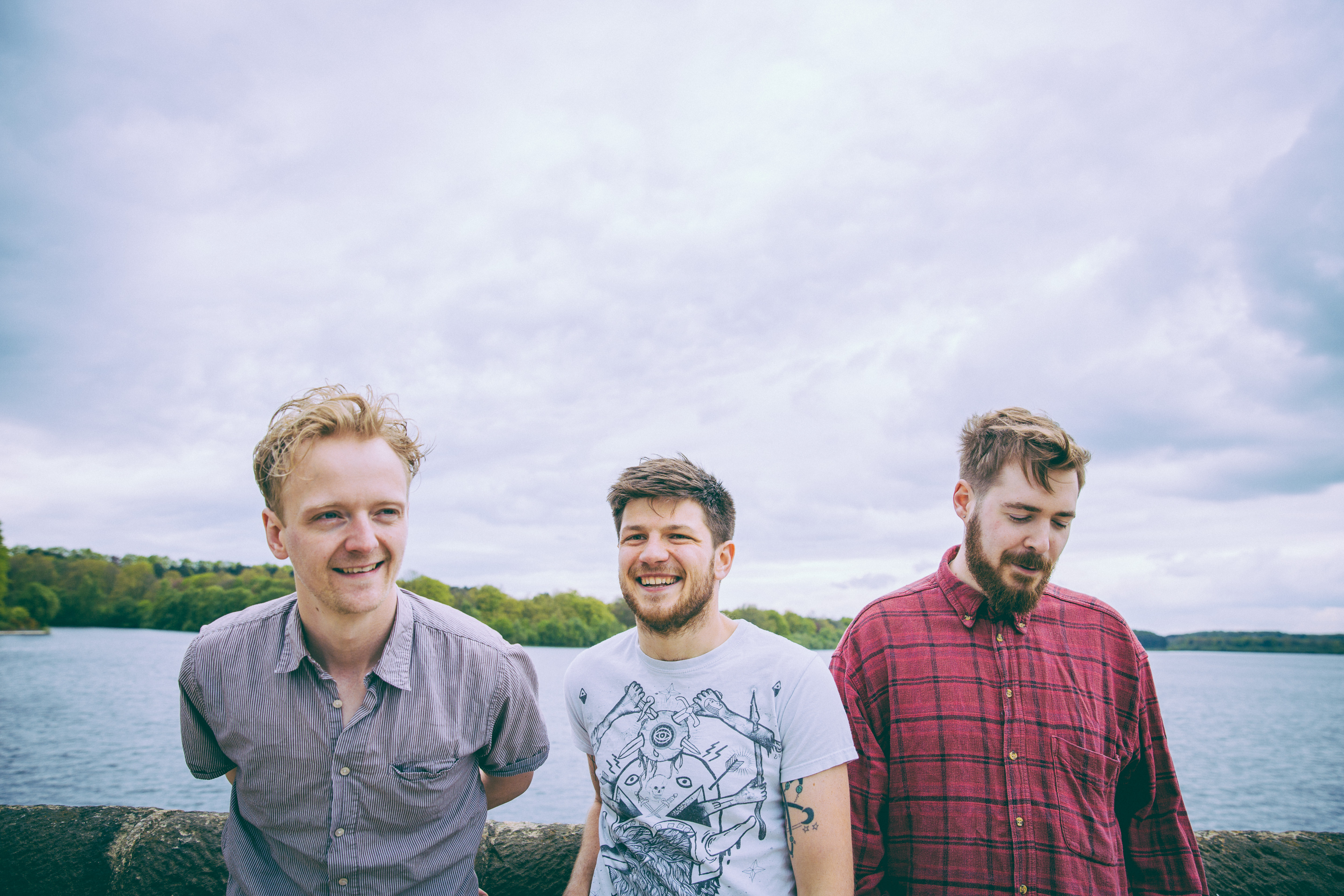
- Bearfoot Beware promotional photo at Eccup Reservoir in 2017

Background information
- Origin: Leeds, West Yorkshire, England
- Genres: Alternative rock, math rock, post-hardcore
- Years active: 2010–2019
- Labels: Superstar Destroyer Records, Voice of Chunk
- Members: Thomas Bradley; Michael Osborne; Richard Vowden
- Website: bearfootbeware.co.uk

Bearfoot Beware were an English rock trio from Leeds, West Yorkshire, England.

== History ==
Bearfoot Beware was formed in late 2010 by guitarist and vocalist Thomas Bradley and bassist Richard Vowden; the line-up was completed with the addition of drummer Michael Osborne.

In 2012 the band released its second EP Bass Lane, performed on the BBC introducing stages at Reading and Leeds Festival, earned a headline slot on the musicians stage at Bingley Music Live, and perform dozens of shows across the country - including at Live at Leeds, the Brudenell Social Club, and British Wildlife Festival.

One of the songs from the record, "Tending to the Slim Pickings on the Floor", was also issued as a 7" split vinyl single with fellow Leeds band Moody Gowns to celebrate Record Store Day. The vinyl edition sold out in stores within a few days, and also received national and local airplay from BBC DJs Tom Robinson (BBC Radio 6) Gideon Coe (BBC Radio 6) and Alan Raw (BBC West Yorkshire).

Between 2013 and 2015, the band continued to perform in Leeds and around the UK and established Chunk, a DIY practice space/venue. They worked on an album, World Owes You Nowt, which was self released on label Voice of CHUNK in 2015.

In 2016, they performed at the StrangeForms Festival in Leeds. In 2018 their 2nd album, Sea Magnolia, was released by Superstar Destroyer Records. They subsequently toured Europe with the noise rock band Irk and performed at ArcTanGent Festival in Bristol

== Releases ==
- No Face's Gold. Self Released EP (2011)
- Split 7" Vinyl w/ Moody Gowns. Self Released 7" Vinyl (2012) 250 copies released as a limited run split with fellow Leeds band Moody Gowns in celebration of Record Store Day.
- Bass Lane. Self Released EP (2012)
- Bruises and Business (2013)
- World Owes You Nowt (2015)
- Sea Magnolia (2018)
