= Gavin Butt =

British art historian

Gavin Butt (born 1967) is a writer and academic based in Brighton, UK.

== Overview ==
Gavin Butt is a transdisciplinary scholar working across the areas of performance studies, queer studies, visual culture, and popular music. He received his PhD from the University of Leeds in 1998 with the dissertation Men on the Threshold: The Making and Unmaking of the Sexual Subject in American Art 1948-1965, later revised and published in 2005 under the title Between You and Me: Queer Disclosures in the New York Art World 1948-1963 by Duke University Press. In 2004 Butt edited the much praised anthology After Criticism - New Approaches to Art and Performance. Here, as in his more recent work on cultural seriousness, he argues for the importance of the paradoxical: criticism that works against the doxa of received wisdom. Butt has written extensively on artists such as Andy Warhol, Larry Rivers, Joe Brainard, Jasper Johns, as well as performance artists such as Kiki and Herb, Oreet Ashery, and David Hoyle.

In 2013 he made his first feature-length documentary film, co-directed with journalist Ben Walters. This is Not a Dream explores artist’s DIY use of moving image technology including original interviews with Vaginal Davis, Dara Birnbaum, David Hoyle, Kalup Linzy, Holestar, Nao Bustamante, Dickie Beau and others. Butt was also co-director of Performance Matters (2009-2013), a creative research project which brought together artists, curators, activists, performance organizers, and academics to investigate the cultural value of performance.

In No Machos or Pop Stars: When the Leeds Art Experiment went Punk, Duke University Press, (2022), "Gavin Butt tells the fascinating story of the post-punk scene in Leeds, showing how England’s state-funded education policy brought together art students from different social classes to create a fertile ground for musical experimentation. Drawing on extensive interviews with band members, their associates, and teachers, Butt details the groups who wanted to dismantle both art world and music industry hierarchies by making it possible to dance to their art. Their stories reveal the subversive influence of art school in a regional music scene of lasting international significance."

Butt is currently Professor of Fine Art at Northumbria University, Newcastle.

== Bibliography ==
=== Books ===
- ed. After Criticism: New Approaches to Art and Performance, Blackwell Publishing, 2004.
- Between You and Me: Queer Disclosures in the New York Art World, Duke University Press, 2005.
- with Irit Rogoff, Visual Cultures as Seriousness, ed. Jorella Andrews, Sternberg Press, 2013.
- ed., with Kodwo Eshun and Mark Fisher (theorist). Post-Punk Then and Now, Repeater Books, 2016.
- No Machos or Pop Stars: When the Leeds Art Experiment went Punk, Duke University Press, 2022

=== Articles ===
- ‘Hoyle’s Humility’, (interview with David Hoyle), in Dance Theatre Journal, Vol. 23, No. 1, 2008.
- ‘Should We Take Performance Seriously?’, in Oreet Ashery, Dancing with Men, 2008.
- ‘How I Died For Kiki and Herb’, in Henry Rogers (ed.), The Art of Queering in Art, Article Press, 2007.
- ‘Stop that Acting! Performance and Authenticity in Shirley Clarke’s Portrait of Jason’, in Kobena Mercer (ed.), Pop Art and Vernacular Cultures, MIT Press / InIVA, 2007.
- ‘Joe Brainard’s Queer Seriousness, or, How to Make Fun Out of the Avant-Garde’, in David Hopkins (ed.), Neo-Avant-Garde, Rodopi Press, 2006.
- ‘Scholarly Flirtations’, in Angelika Nollert, Irit Rogoff, Bart de Baere, Yilmaz Dziewior, Charles Esche, Kerstin Niemann und Dieter Roelstraete (eds.), A.C.A.D.E.M.Y, Revolver 2006.
- ‘America and its Discontents: Art and Politics 1945-1960’, in Amelia Jones (ed.), Contemporary Art Since 1945, Blackwell, 2006.
- ‘Happenings in History, or, The Epistemology of the Memoir’, Oxford Art Journal, Vol. 24, No. 2, 2001.

=== Interviews ===
Mathias Danbolt, Dismantling the Serious Machine - An Interview with Gavin Butt in Trikster - Nordic Queer Journal #3, 2009.
