= Dinosaur Pile-Up =

English alternative rock band

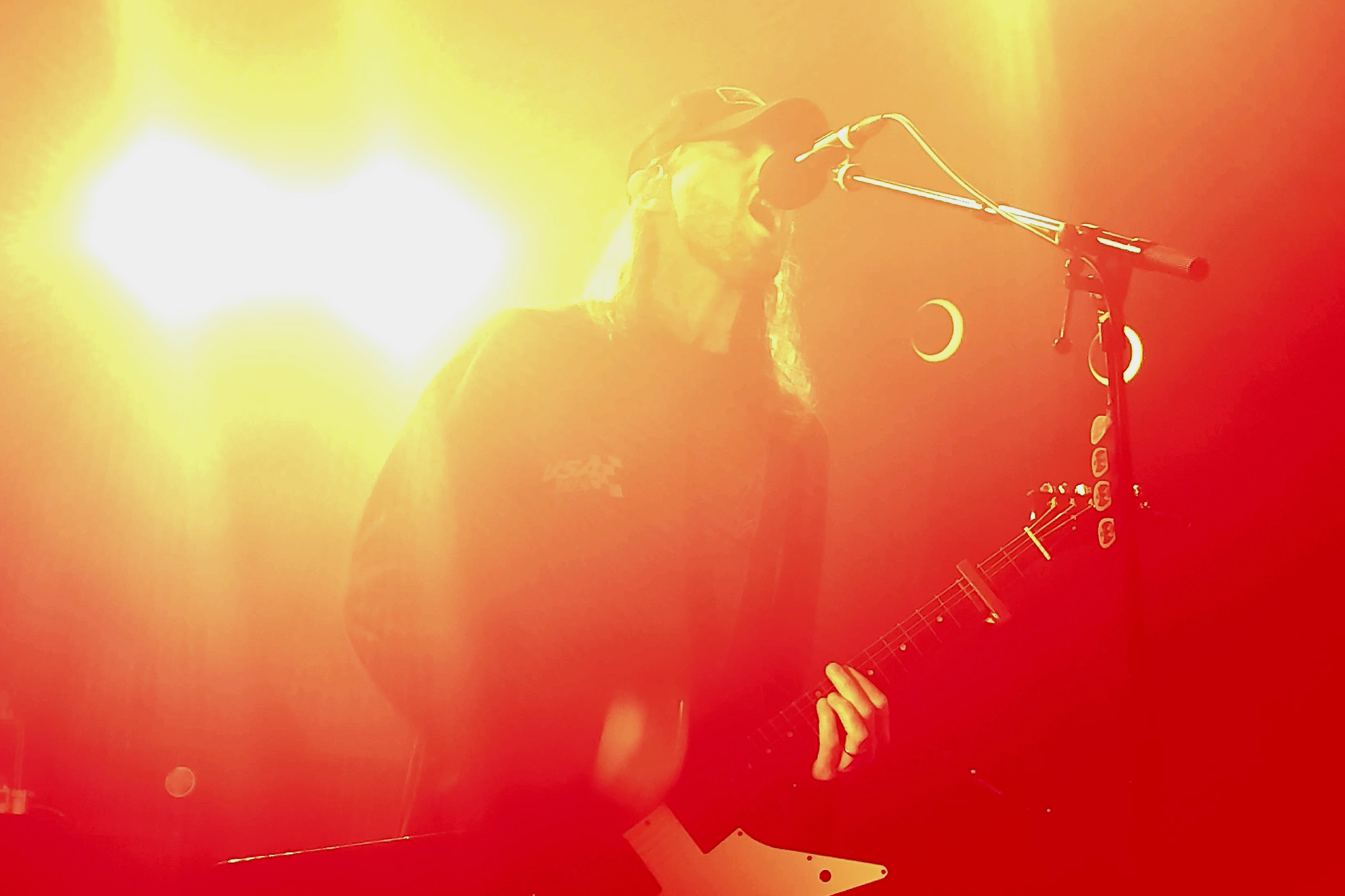
- Dinosaur Pile-Up in 2025

Background information
- Origin: Leeds, West Yorkshire, England
- Genres: Alternative rock; grunge; post-grunge; pop punk; garage rock
- Years active: 2007–present
- Labels: So Recordings, Big Brain, Mascot Records
- Members: Matt Bigland; Mike Sheils; Jim Cratchley
- Past members: Tommy Davidson; James Sacha; Tom Dornford-May; Johnny Seymour; Steve Wilson; Harry Johns
- Website: dinosaurpileup.com

Dinosaur Pile-Up is an English alternative rock band formed in late 2007, hailing from Leeds, West Yorkshire. Current members are lead singer and guitarist Matt Bigland, drummer Mike Sheils and bassist Jim Cratchley. Their past members include Steve Wilson (2008–2010), Tom Dornford-May (2008–2010), Tommy Davidson (2008), Harry Johns (2010–2011), and James Sacha (2013).

== History ==
=== Formation and early EPs (2007–2010) ===
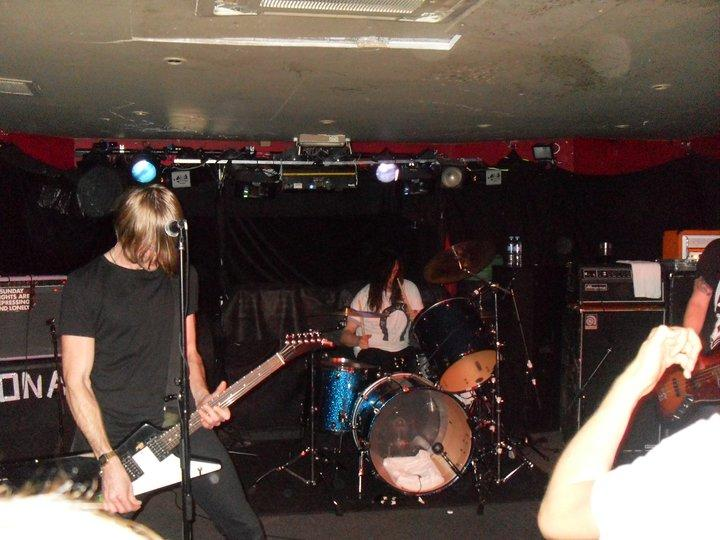
Dinosaur Pile-Up performing live in 2010

In 2007, while a member of Mother Vulpine, the band's guitarist and vocalist, Matt Bigland, began writing. He would record demos of the songs afterhours at the Brudenell Social Club, playing every instrument. By the end of the year, Bigland had made the decision to end Mother Vulpine and focus solely on this new project. He named the project Dinosaur Pile-Up, based on a scene from the 2005 film King Kong. Matt Bigland has said in an interview; "I watched the remake of King Kong. Which was pretty bad! It was ages ago, before this band, or even the idea of this band ever existed. Anyway, there was this part in it where this stampede of dinosaurs, the front one is shot in the leg or something, and it trips up, and then all these huge dinosaurs trip up, roll down this hill, and it just ends up in this massive pile up, and everything in between them survives. I thought it was ridiculous, and as a joke I said, I have to start a band called Dinosaur Pile-Up." Bigland recruited Tom Dornford-May of U R Penetrators on bass and Steve Wilson of This Et Al on drums to complete the line up.

Dinosaur Pile-Up then released My Rock 'n' Roll EP in late 2008 and the Traynor 7" and The Most Powerful EP in the Universe in 2009. Also in 2009, they played on the BBC introducing stage at Leeds Festival Between 9 and 16 October 2009, they supported the Pixies on their European headline tour. ln 2010, Tom Dornford-May and Steve Wilson left the band; Wilson joined Japanese Voyeurs, and Dornford-May joined the punk rock band Fake Death. They were replaced by bassist Harry Johns from The Old Romantic Killer Band, and drummer Mike Shells, formerly of the Brownies.

=== Growing Pains (2010–2013) ===
Dinosaur Pile-Up performing live in 2011

Matt Bigland then went into the studio alone to record Dinosaur Pile-Up's debut album Growing Pains, and bassist Harry Johns and drummer Mike Sheils were recruited for the rhythm section for live shows. The recording of Growing Pains took place between late 2009 and early 2010 in the space of about two and a half months. Growing Pains was recorded solely by Matt Bigland playing all the parts on the album in a home studio in Bridlington. After the release of Growing Pains in October 2010, Dinosaur Pile-Up began a full UK tour, also playing in the rock exposure tour and various dates across Mexico, as well as supporting slots with bands such as Feeder, Cage the Elephant, Turbowolf and Twin Atlantic. By August 2011, the band had finished their tour and are set to record their follow up album due to be released at the beginning of 2012. On 1 December, they uploaded to their SoundCloud and Facebook accounts demos of two tracks, "In My Room" and "Thread", which were said to be featured on their second album, 'Nature Nurture', but never made it onto the album, they only appeared as B-sides.

In November 2011, Matt Bigland posted on the Dinosaur Pile-Up website that Harry Johns had left the band to concentrate on his solo project and that two people known as Alessio and Scott were filling in on bass and second guitar. Also, On 8 March 2012, Japanese Voyeurs had announced their breakup and said on their Facebook that their bassist Johnny Seymour had joined Dinosaur Pile-Up. Matt Bigland has also said he was currently in the studio recording the second album and would be recording every instrument on the record as he did on Growing Pains.

=== Nature Nurture (2013–2014) ===
On 22 January 2013, Dinosaur Pile-Up announced the follow-up to Growing Pains, 'Nature Nurture', with the free-download of 'Lip Hook Kiss' off the band's website. The album was released in the UK in June 2013 and in the U.S. in February 2014 on So Recordings, the rock imprint of Silva Screen Records. To coincide with the band's debut U.S. tour supporting You Me At Six, they released a video for the song 'Peninsula' as well as the U.S. exclusive Peninsula EP. In late February 2014, the band undertook another U.S. tour supporting Middle Class Rut with additional showcases at South by Southwest. They also supported Brand New on a U.S. tour in July 2014. They continued to tour until December 2014, ending their tour in Delhi.

=== Eleven Eleven (2014–2019) ===
On 14 December 2014, Dinosaur Pile-Up announced the recording of their third album, 'Eleven Eleven', via an Instagram post. They also revealed to be working with the greatly acknowledged producer Tom Dalgety, who had worked with successful acts like Royal Blood and Turbowolf, in Rockfield Studios. Throughout the next months, various teasers were released on images and videos of the band in the studio, including a YouTube video on working with the famous producer in Rockfield. In the middle of March 2015, after the constant teasing of something being announced at 11:11 of random days, revealed a brand new song entitled '11:11' via a SoundCloud stream and the album title 'Eleven Eleven'. They revealed a teaser for a brand new music video in April of the same year. In May 2015, they also announced the 2nd EP release limited to Japan to be released on 22 July, entitled '11:11 - EP', consisting of new tracks from the album including bonus track 'Replace Me'. The album was set for release worldwide on 16 October 2015, with album bundles including signed vinyl and exclusive T-shirts.

Due to lack of a worldwide distributor, the release of Eleven Eleven was delayed by almost a year before being finally released to the rest of the world, meaning, in certain parts of the world, the band were touring an album that had already been out for months in the UK, but were new everywhere else. This outraged the band, with drummer, Mike Sheils stating in a 2017 interview in the US, 'it's really strange, yeah, as it seems like a lifetime ago we recording the whole thing now, but over here it's fresh as a daisy. It is what it is, mind you, and we're just lucky we finally managed to get it out, there, you know? People seem to be enjoyin' it and we love playing it. It's a new direction for us.'

=== Celebrity Mansions and I've Felt Better (2019–present) ===
Dinosaur Pile-Up performing live in 2022

The band's fourth studio album, Celebrity Mansions, was released on 7 June 2019. The lead single from the album, "Thrash Metal Cassette", was released in March 2019. The band released their second single from the album "Back Foot" in May 2019 and third single "Round the Bend" in June 2019. Loudwire named the album one of the 50 best rock albums of 2019.

The band's fifth studio album, I've Felt Better was released on 22 August 2025 via the band's new label Mascot Records.

The lead single from the album was "Bout to Lose It" released in March 2025, with the follow-up single "My Way" in April 2025, accompanied by a music video.

In 2026, the band started a tour of the United States along with stints on the USA Warped Tour as part of the I've Felt Better promotional tour.

== Musical style ==
Critics have categorised Dinosaur Pile-Up's music as post-grunge, grunge, pop punk, alternative rock and garage rock.

Dinosaur Pile-Up have alternative rock influences from bands like the Pixies, Queens of the Stone Age, Mudhoney, Foo Fighters, Weezer, Nirvana, the Smashing Pumpkins, Pavement and Rage Against the Machine, rock acts from the 1960s like the Beach Boys and the Beatles, and metal groups such as Slayer and Deftones. NME described their style as "equal parts Foo Fighters and Weezer, add a pinch of Pavement and just a touch of Biffy".

Since Nature Nurture, the band usually play in drop C sharp tuning or E♭ tuning with or without a capo, tuning down half a step from standard tuning and drop D tuning as was used on earlier material.

Alongside Japanese Voyeurs, the band were central to the British grunge revival of the late 2000s and early 2010s.

They have been cited as an influence by Muskets, Fizzy Blood and Fangclub.

== Band members ==
Current

- Matt Bigland – vocals, guitar (2007–present)
- Jim Cratchley – bass (2013–present)
- Mike Sheils – drums (2010–present)

Former

- Tom Dornford-May – bass (2008–2010)
- Steve Wilson – drums (2008–2010)
- Harry Johns – bass (2010–2012)
- Johnny Seymour – bass (2012)
- James Sacha – bass (2013)

== Discography ==
=== Studio albums ===
| Title | Details | Peak chart positions | |
| Title | Details | UK | JPN |
|---|---|---|---|
| Growing Pains | Released: 4 October 2010; Label: Friends vs. Records; Formats: CD, digital download, vinyl | 108 | — |
| Nature Nurture | Released: 17 June 2013; Label: SO; Formats: CD, digital download, vinyl | — | 168 |
| Eleven Eleven | Released: 16 October 2015; Label: SO; Formats: CD, digital download, vinyl | 169 | 255 |
| Celebrity Mansions | Released: 7 June 2019; Label: Parlophone; Formats: CD, digital download, vinyl | — | — |
| I've Felt Better | Released: 22 August 2025; Label: Mascot Records; Formats: CD, digital download, vinyl | — | — |
"—" denotes a title that did not chart or was not released.

=== Extended plays ===
| Year | Title |
|---|---|
| 2008 | My Rock 'n' Roll EP: Label: Friends vs. Records; Formats: CD, vinyl |
| 2009 | Traynor 7": Label: Friends vs. Records; Formats: CD, vinyl |
| 2009 | The Most Powerful EP in the Universe!!: Released: 24 August 2009; Label: Friends vs. Records; Formats: CD, vinyl, digital download |
| 2013 | Peninsula: Released: 29 October 2013, 14 July 2014 (Japan); Label: So Recordings/ Silva Screen Recordings Ltd., A-Sketch (Japan); Formats: Digital download, CD (Japan) |
| 2014 | Nurtured EP: Released 15 December 2014; Label: So Recordings/ Silva Screen Recordings Ltd.; Formats: Digital download |
| 2015 | 11:11: Released: 22 July 2015 (Japan exclusive); Label: A-Sketch; Formats: Digital download, CD |

=== Singles ===
| Year | Title | Chart positions | | | | | | Album |
| Year | Title | CAN Rock | JPN Air | NZ Hot | US Air | US Main | US Rock | Album |
|---|---|---|---|---|---|---|---|---|
| 2009 | "Traynor" | — | — | — | — | — | — | Growing Pains |
| 2010 | "Birds & Planes" | — | — | — | — | — | — | Growing Pains |
| 2010 | "Mona Lisa" | — | — | — | — | — | — | Growing Pains |
| 2011 | "My Rock N Roll" | — | — | — | — | — | — | Growing Pains |
| 2013 | "Arizona Waiting" | — | 68 | — | — | — | — | Nature Nurture |
| 2013 | "Peninsula" | — | — | — | — | — | — | Nature Nurture |
| 2015 | "11:11" | — | — | — | 39 | 13 | — | Eleven Eleven |
| 2015 | "Grim Valentine" | — | — | — | — | — | — | Eleven Eleven |
| 2019 | "Thrash Metal Cassette" | — | — | — | — | — | — | Celebrity Mansions |
| 2019 | "Back Foot" | 22 | — | 32 | 18 | 5 | 35 | Celebrity Mansions |
| 2020 | "Round the Bend" | — | — | — | — | 32 | — | Celebrity Mansions |
| 2025 | "Bout to Lose It" | — | — | — | — | 24 | — | I've Felt Better |
| 2025 | "My Way" | — | — | — | — | — | — | I've Felt Better |
"—" denotes a title that did not chart or was not released.

=== Music videos ===
| Year | Title | Director(s) |
|---|---|---|
| 2010 | "Mona Lisa" | Matt Bigland and Matt Maude |
| 2011 | "My Rock n Roll" | The Blind Club |
| 2013 | "Derail" | Remy Cayuela |
| 2013 | "Peninsula" | Jonathan & Jonathan |
| 2014 | "Nature Nurture" | Ralph Fuller |
| 2015 | "11:11" | Jay Maude |
| 2019 | "Back Foot" | Grain Freeze |
| 2020 | "Round the Bend" | Toon53 Productions |
| 2020 | "It's Tricky" | Grain Freeze |
| 2025 | "'Bout to Lose It" | |
| 2025 | "My Way" | |
