= Gaffa Tape Sandy =

English garage rock band

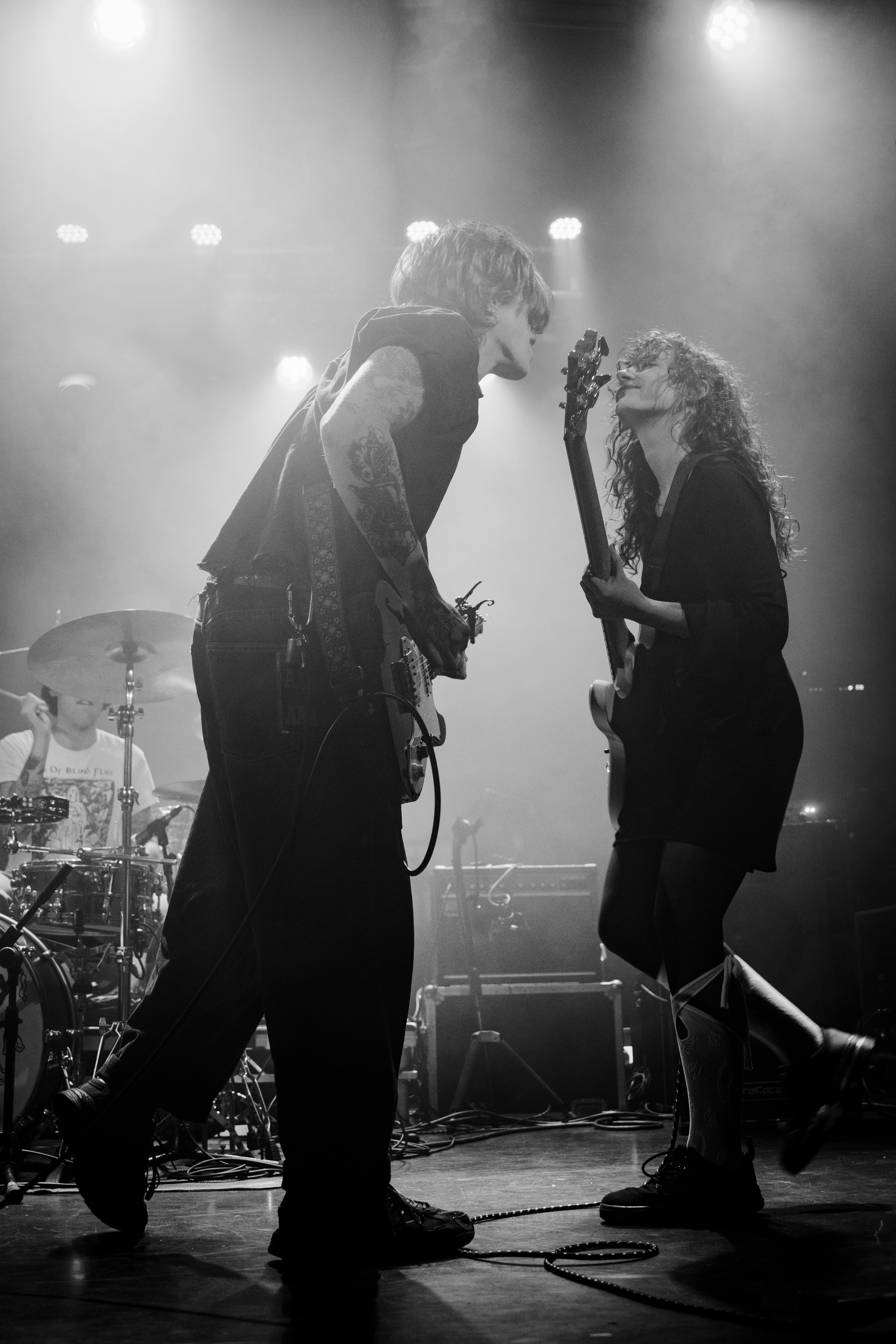
- Gaffa Tape Sandy performing at the Electric Ballroom in London in 2025

Background information
- Origin: Bury St Edmunds, England
- Genres: Garage rock, garage punk, alternative rock, indie rock
- Years active: 2015–present
- Labels: Antigen Records, Alcopop! Records, Counter Intuitive Records
- Members: Kim Jarvis; Catherine Lindley-Neilson; Robin Francis
- Website: www.gaffatapesandy.co.uk

Gaffa Tape Sandy are an English garage rock band, formed in 2015 in Bury St Edmunds and now based in Brighton, England. The band is composed of singer-guitarist Kim Jarvis, singer-bassist Catherine Neilson and drummer Robin Francis.

== History ==
=== Formation and early releases (2016–2018) ===
The band formed after meeting while studying music & music technology at West Suffolk College in Bury St Edmunds, before releasing their debut single "Smart Dressed Guy" in February 2016 to critical acclaim, followed by their debut EP Spring Killing in April 2017.

This resulted in the band being chosen to perform at Glastonbury Festival in June 2017 on the BBC Music Introducing Stage. The band then released their single "Beehive" in October 2017 on Antigen Records, described by NME as "Skittish time signatures à la Ty Segall and Thee Oh Sees kick things off, but when the group operate at full throttle in the chorus things rightly kick things up a gear"

Often asked where the name "Gaffa Tape Sandy" came from, the band would make up a story about it on the spot, saying "We usually just come up with stuff as it’s just a bad pun to be perfectly honest. Because gaffa tape is handy."

In February 2018, Gaffa Tape Sandy embarked on their first support tour with Kent-based band Indoor Pets around the UK, alongside fellow support band Peaness.

Their next single "Meat Head" was released in June 2018, with the band describing it as "an attack on the type of mind-sets people harbour which involve believing that they somehow own or have the right to the body of another person." The release proved to be provocative early on when the digital release was almost delayed when its artwork was flagged as "nudity/pornagraphic", with Antigen Records challenging this upon release by writing "It’s good to know that over a hundred years after the censure of Les Demoiselles d’Avignon by Picasso, abstract representations of the female form can still arouse dangerous levels of sexual excitement in men, to the extent that they must be removed from public view."

Gaffa Tape Sandy were named as one of NME's 100 Essential Acts for 2018 before embarking on numerous festival appearances, including: Live At Leeds, Liverpool Sound City, The Great Escape Festival, Truck Festival, Y Not? Festival, Latitude Festival, and Iceland Airwaves.

=== Family Mammal (2019–2022) ===
With the release of their single "Headlights" on 20 March 2019, Gaffa Tape Sandy announced that they had signed with Alcopop! Records for the release of their next EP.

On 8 August 2019, Gaffa Tape Sandy released their EP "Family Mammal". It was well reviewed gaining 4/5 from The Skinny, saying: "Gaffa Tape Sandy combine melodic indie notes, raw garage rock and rowdy punk references for their sophomore EP", and Punktastic saying "...every track is infectious and almost demands repeat listening, with more hooks and earworms than a fishing tackle shop."

Gaffa Tape Sandy embarked on their first headline tour in March 2020, before being cut short due to the UK covid-19 lockdown. The remainder of 2020 saw the band performing digital festivals, such as "Homeschool" in aid of NHS Charities Together.

In 2022, after a number of rescheduling attempts, Gaffa Tape Sandy performed at Sniester Festival in Den Haag, and V11 in Rotterdam. This was followed by a short tour in France in June, and performing on the BBC Sounds stage at Latitude Festival in July 2022.

=== Hold My Hand, God Damn It (2023–present) ===
2023 saw Gaffa Tape Sandy join The Subways on their UK tour in January, supporting Mom Jeans in February, and performing at 2000trees in July.

The band released "Split", their first single in 3 years, on 28 November 2023 with their debut album "Hold My Hand, God Damn It" following on 31 May 2024, released on Alcopop! Records (UK) and Counter Intuitive Records (USA). September & October 2024 saw a UK headline tour to promote their debut album release, before supporting Destroy Boys on their January & February 2025 tour of the United Kingdom & European Union.

== Band members ==
=== Current members ===
- Kim Jarvis – lead vocals, guitar
- Catherine Lindley-Neilson – lead vocals, bass
- Robin Francis – drums

== Discography ==
=== Studio albums ===
- Hold My Hand, God Damn It (2024) - Alcopop! Records & Counter Intuitive Records

=== Extended plays ===
- Spring Killing (2017) - Antigen Records
- Family Mammal (2019) - Alcopop! Records

=== Singles ===
- Smart Dressed Guy (2016) - Self Release
- Water Bottle (2017) - Self Release
- Beehive (2017) - Antigen Records
- Pink Neck/Train Wreck & Manager (2017) - We Are Hurd (limited 7" vinyl)
- Smart Dressed Guy (2018) - Repeat Records (Record Store Day 2018 limited flexi vinyl)
- Meat Head (2018) - Antigen Records
- Headlights (2019) - Alcopop! Records
- They Want Us To Die (2020) - Repeat Records (Collaborative single alongside Tundra, Kulk, B.U.H., and Seymour Quigley)
- Split (2023) - Alcopop! Records
- Scrapbook (2024) - Alcopop! Records
- Dead To Me (2024) - Alcopop! Records
