= Our Guest Can't Be Named =

Studio album by The Wytches
- Released: 22 September 2023
- Genre: Rock
- Length: 42:55
- Label: Alcopop!
- Producer: The Wytches

The Wytches chronology
Three Mile Ditch (2020)	Our Guest Can't Be Named (2023)

Singles from Our Guest Can't Be Named
- 1. "Maria" Released: 4 July 2023; 2. "Unsure" Released: 6 February 2024

Professional ratings
Review scores
Source	Rating
Distorted Sound	7/10
DIY	4/5 stars
Far Out	3.5/5 stars
The Spill	3.5/5

Our Guest Can't Be Named is the fourth studio album by British rock band The Wytches. It was released on 22 September 2023 through Alcopop! Records, making it the band's first album for the label. Production was handled by the Wytches themselves. The album was supported with singles "Maria" and "Unsure". Music videos were shot for "Maria" directed by Mark Breed, "Zep Step" directed by Breed and Wolfgang Dubieniec, and "Unsure" directed by Breed, Kristian Bell and Ellie Dolphin.

In the United Kingdom, the album peaked at No. 97 on the Scottish Albums Chart, No. 78 on the Albums Sales Chart, No. 73 on the Physical Albums Chart, Np. 26 on the Vinyl Albums Chart, No. 11 on the Record Store Chart, No. 32 on the Independent Albums Chart, and No. 6 on the Independent Album Breakers Chart.

== Track listing ==
No.	Title	Writer(s)	Length
1.	"Zep Step"	The Wytches	2:46
2.	"Maria"	The Wytches	3:09
3.	"Sloped Old Tower"	kristian Bell	3:58
4.	"Bats"	Kristian Bell	5:44
5.	"Unsure"	Kristian Bell	4:33
6.	"Spark"	Kristian Bell	3:46
7.	"Something to Fall Back On"	The Wytches	3:52
8.	"Our Guest Can't Be Named"	The Wytches	4:14
9.	"Bill Blood"	Kristian Bell	5:37
10.	"Fool"	Kristian Bell	5:16
Total length:			42:55

== Personnel ==
- Kristian Bell – vocals, guitar, keyboards, drums
- Dan Rumsey – bass
- Mark Breed – backing vocals, guitar, keyboards, piano, bow bass, drums
- Luke Oldfield – Hammond organ, tambourine, whistle, recording, mixing, mastering
- Samuel Gull – artwork, design

== Charts ==
Chart (2023)	Peak position
Scottish Albums (Official Charts)	97
UK Independent Albums (Official Charts)	32
