= Speakeasy (Freeze the Atlantic album) =

Studio album by Freeze the Atlantic
- Released: 17 September 2012
- Genre: Alternative rock
- Length: 34:24
- Label: Alcopop! Records
- Producer: Guy Davis

Freeze the Atlantic chronology
Colour by Numbers (2011)	Speakeasy (2012)	Freeze the Atlantic (2014)

Professional ratings
Review scores
Source	Rating
The 405	8/10 stars
Absolute Punk	75%
Dead Press!	8/10 stars
Shout 4 Music	8/10 stars
Ultimate Guitar	8/10 stars

Speakeasy is the debut studio album from Farnborough based rock band Freeze the Atlantic. The album features a re-recorded version of "The Alibi" as well as a full band version of "Broken Bones" from their Colour by Numbers EP.

== Track listing ==
All music is composed by Freeze the Atlantic and Jon Pearce except where noted.

No.	Title	Length
1.	"Shivering & Dazed"	2:49
2.	"Conflict! Conflict!"	2:39
3.	"Broken Bones"	2:45
4.	"Le Track"	3:12
5.	"Volcanoes" (Freeze the Atlantic/Jon Pearce/Liv Puente)	3:17
6.	"This Isn't Maths, This Is Rock 'N' Roll" (Freeze the Atlantic/Jon Pearce/Liv Puente)	3:05
7.	"Crestfallen"	3:42
8.	"Loses All The Romance"	3:22
9.	"The Colour"	3:15
10.	"The Alibi"	2:18
11.	"Feather In A Hurricane"	4:05
Total length:		34:24

== Personnel ==
Freeze the Atlantic

- Chris Knott - vocals
- Andy Gilmour - guitar/vocals
- Tom Stevens - guitar/piano/vocals
- Sean Shreeve - bass/vocals
- Guy Davis - drums/percussion

Guest vocalists

- Liv Puente – vocals on "Volcanoes"
- Colin Doran – vocals on "Loses All The Romance"
- JP Reid – vocals on "The Alibi"

Additional personnel

- Harry White – strings on "Crestfallen"
