= Freeze the Atlantic (album) =

Studio album by Freeze the Atlantic
- Released: 16 June 2014
- Genre: Alternative rock
- Length: 43:38
- Label: Alcopop! Records
- Producer: Guy Davis

Freeze the Atlantic chronology
Speakeasy (2012)	Freeze the Atlantic (2014)	The People Are Revolting (2017)

Professional ratings
Review scores
Source	Rating
7 Bit Arcade	(favorable)
Kerrang	4/5 stars
NME	7/10 stars
Rock Sound	7/10 stars
Shout 4 Music	8/10 stars

Freeze the Atlantic is the eponymously-titled second studio album by the Farnborough-based rock band of the same name. The album was produced and mixed by drummer Guy Davis and released on 16 June 2014 through Alcopop! Records. It is the first record with Liv Puente as the bands permanent vocalist and the last album to feature Sean Shreeve who would go on to leave the band at the end of 2014.

== Track listing ==
All music is composed by Freeze the Atlantic.

No.	Title	Length
1.	"Welcome Back To Nibelheim"	2:44
2.	"The Last Great Train Robbery"	3:18
3.	"Hectares"	3:37
4.	"Stompbox"	2:35
5.	"Like Gravity"	2:48
6.	"There Is A Spark"	3:45
7.	"Idiot Check"	4:33
8.	"Occams Razor"	4:13
9.	"Bound"	3:09
10.	"Tusen Takk"	2:50
11.	"You Drove Me To Taxidermy"	5:01
12.	"Everything All The Time"	2:14
13.	"This Fight"	2:59
Total length:		43:38

== Personnel ==
Freeze the Atlantic

- Liv Puente - vocals
- Andy Gilmour - guitar/vocals
- Tom Stevens - guitar/piano/vocals
- Sean Shreeve - bass/vocals
- Guy Davis - drums/percussion

Guest vocalists

- Chris Knott – vocals on "Bound"
