= Fenne Lily =

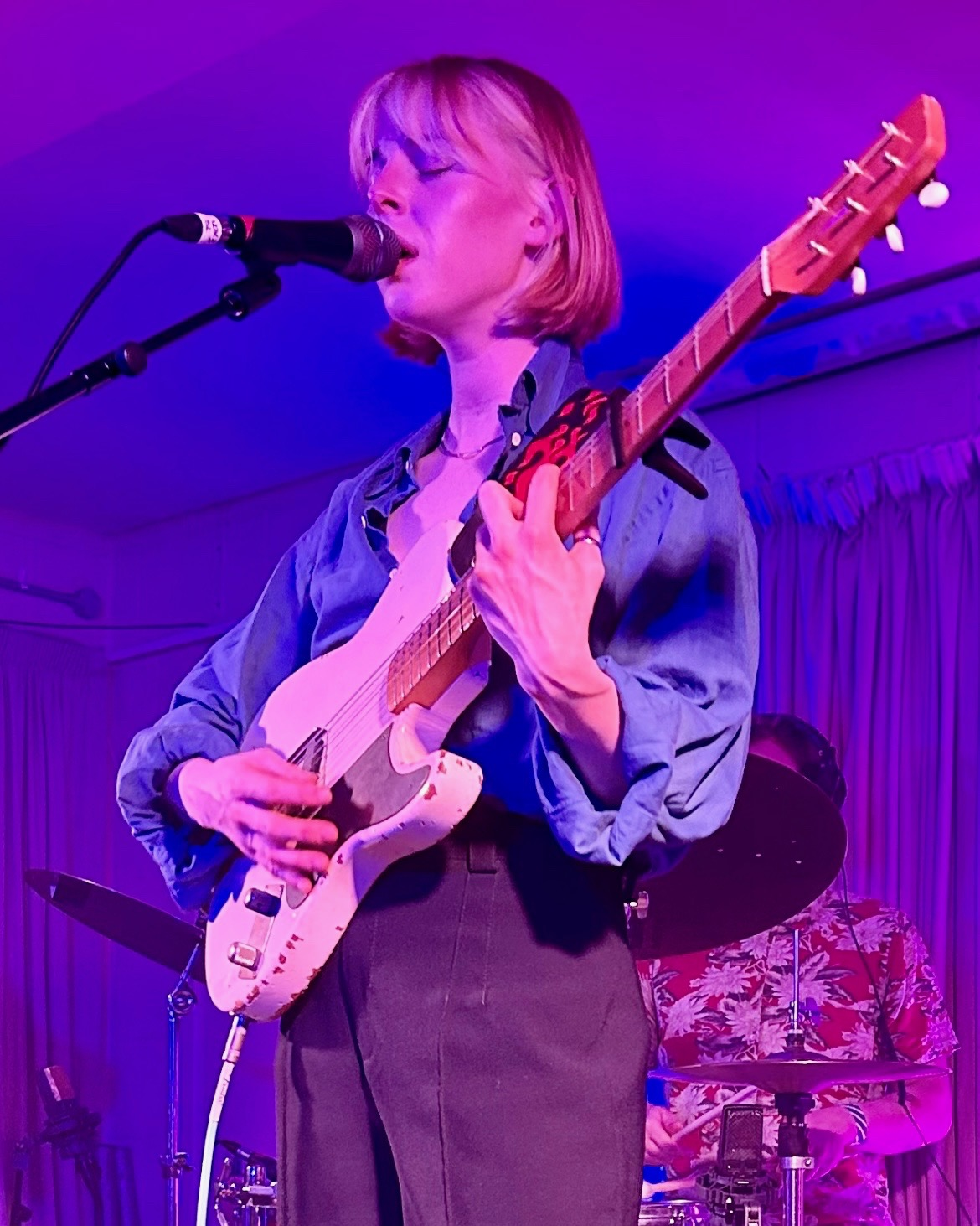
- Lily performing at the Pink Room at Yes in Manchester, England, 2023

Background information
- Born: 20 January 1997 (age 29); Dorset, England
- Genres: Indie folk
- Occupation: Singer-songwriter
- Instruments: Vocals; guitar
- Years active: 2016–present
- Labels: Dead Oceans; publisher: Universal
- Website: fenne-lily.com

Fenne Lily (born 20 January 1997) is an English folk singer-songwriter. Her debut studio album, On Hold, was released in 2018.

== Early life ==
Fenne Lily was born in Dorset, England. She has a brother, to whom her song "Brother" is dedicated. She attended Beaminster School until the age of 16 and began playing concerts in Bristol at around the age of 15.

During her teens, Lily worked in a record shop in Bridport, Dorset.

== Career ==
=== 2016–2017 ===
In 2016, Lily began to play at music festivals around the UK. At T in the Park Festival, she was asked to play a session on the BBC Music Introducing stage. That year, Fenne Lily also played at Larmer Tree Festival, Latitude Festival, Bluedot Festival, Farmfestival, Port Eliot Festival, Seven Layers, Sŵn Festival and at High and Lonesome Festival.

In 2017, Lily was awarded a Momentum grant by the Performing Rights Society. In late 2017, Lily supported Sivu, Siv Jakobsen and Paul Thomas Saunders on a UK tour.

=== 2018: On Hold ===
Her debut studio album, On Hold, was self-released in early 2018. During this time, she also supported Dodie during her 2018 UK tour.

In August 2018, Lily played on the Rising stage at the Green Man Festival in Wales. A support slot with Lucy Dacus followed in the autumn, and the pair later toured the US together. Lily was warmly received in the US. She returned to the UK in mid-2019.

=== 2020–present: Breach and Big Picture ===
In 2020, Lily released "Hypochondriac", her first single on Dead Oceans, followed by her second single "To Be a Woman Pt. 2" which was released in April 2020. In June 2020, she released her lead single titled "Alapathy" from her upcoming studio album as well as a music video to go along with it and launched details for her studio album, Breach. On August 26, 2020, Lily released the single "Solipsism" with an accompanying music video.

On 18 September 2020, she released her second studio album, Breach.

In the fall of 2021, Lily embarked on a headline British tour. She was supported by fellow Bristolians Langkamer and by Northampton-based singer-songwriter Katie Malco.

On 17 January 2023, she released the first single "Lights Light Up" from her forthcoming studio album Big Picture and announced European and US tour dates. Big Picture was released on 14 April 2023.

== Discography ==
Studio albums

- On Hold (2018)
- Breach (2020)
- Big Picture (2023)
- Win Win (2026)
