= Colour by Numbers (disambiguation) =

Colour by Numbers most commonly refers to the second studio album by Culture Club.

Colour by Numbers may also refer to:

- Colour by Numbers (Freeze the Atlantic EP), 2011
- Colour by Numbers (art installation), an interactive light exhibit in Telefonplan
- Colour by number, a painting technique
