= False advertising (disambiguation) =

False advertising is the use of deliberately false statements or deception in advertising.

False Advertising may also refer to:

- False Advertising (song), on Lifted or The Story Is in the Soil, Keep Your Ear to the Ground, the fourth album by Bright Eyes
- False Advertising (band), an alternative rock group from England
