= Am I Dead Yet =

Am I Dead Yet may refer to:

== Books ==
- Am I Dead Yet: A Journalist's Perspective on Terror, a book by John Scully

== Music ==
- "Am I Dead Yet?", a song on the 2018 album Deportation Blues
- "Am I Dead Yet?", a song on the 1993 album Life in the Dirty District
- Am I Dead Yet, a band formed by Mary Byker and Noko
