= Romantic Errors of Our Youth =

Studio album by Brawlers
- Released: 6 April 2015
- Genre: Punk rock; indie rock
- Length: 25:15
- Label: Alcopop! Records

Brawlers chronology
I Am a Worthless Piece of Shit (2014)	Romantic Errors of Our Youth (2015)

Romantic Errors of Our Youth is the debut studio album from Leeds based punk rock band Brawlers. It was released on April 6, 2015 through Alcopop! Records.

== Track listing ==
All music is composed by Brawlers.

No.	Title	Length
1.	"Annabel"	1:47
2.	"Drink & Dial"	1:53
3.	"Holding Back"	2:15
4.	"High Again"	2:06
5.	"N.O.R.E.S.T."	2:19
6.	"Two Minutes"	2:01
7.	"(I'm Having A) Nervous Breakdown"	2:25
8.	"Windowmisser"	3:31
9.	"Medicine"	2:34
10.	"Romantic Errors of Our Youth"	4:24
Total length:		25:15

== Personnel ==
Brawlers

- Anthony Wright - Bass
- Tom Knox - Drums
- Matthew Wright - Guitar
- Harry Johns - Vocals
