= Brawlers (band) =

English punk rock band

- Origin: Leeds, England
- Genres: Punk rock; indie rock
- Years active: 2013–present
- Label: Alcopop! Records
- Members: Harry Johns; Anthony Wright; Pert; Matt Wright
- Past members: Tom Knox

Brawlers are an English punk rock band from Leeds, West Yorkshire, England.

== History ==
=== Formation and debut EP ===
The band were formed in the summer of 2013 by Harry Johns and Anthony Wright following Johns departure from Dinosaur Pile-Up and the hiatus of Castrovalva, who teamed up with former Leftöver Crack drummer Tom Knox and We Were Frontiers guitarist Matt Wright. In early 2014 the band released their debut EP, I Am a Worthless Piece of Shit was released on Alcopop! Records. Towards the end of 2014, Kerrang! magazine named Brawlers as one of the 20 hottest bands in the world.

=== Romantic Errors of Our Youth ===
Tom Knox left the group in early 2015 and was replaced by Pert, formerly of Beretta Suicide. On 14 January 2015 Brawlers announced that their debut album would be called Romantic Errors of Our Youth and would be released on 6 April 2015 through Alcopop! Records followed by a co-headlineing tour with Max Raptor.

The band have since toured with Set if Off, Decade, Real Friends, Allusondrugs, Lower Than Atlantis, Mooseblood and As It Is. 2016 saw the band head to Australia for a tour with Luca Brasi.

== Band members ==
=== Current ===
- Anthony Wright – bass (2013–present)
- Harry Johns – vocals (2013–present)
- Matthew Wright – guitar (2013–present)
- Pert – drums (2015–present)

=== Former ===
- Tom Knox – drums (2013–2015)

== Discography ==
=== Studio albums ===
- "Romantic Errors of Our Youth" - Alcopop! Records (2015)

=== EPs ===
- "I Am a Worthless Piece of Shit" - Alcopop! Records (2014)

=== Music videos ===
- Mothers & Fathers (2014)
- Two Minutes (2014)
- Annabel (2015)
