= Paint by number (disambiguation) =

Paint by number is a painting technique where each area is marked with a number that corresponds to a particular color.

Paint by number(s) may also refer to:

== Music ==
=== Albums ===
- Paint by Number, by the band 3
- Paint by Number Songs, by Sole
- Paint by Numbers, by Christian Walz

=== Songs ===
- "Paint by Numbers", by Self
- "Paint by Numbers", by ACODA
- "Paint by Numbers", by Max George
- "Paint by Numbers", by Hybrid Minds featuring Charlotte Haining
- "Paint by Numbers", from Whoop Dee Doo by the Muffs
- "Paint by Numbers", from 24 Carrots by Al Stewart
- "Paint by Numbers", from Kiss All the Time. Disco, Occasionally by Harry Styles
- "Paint by Number Heart", from Metro Music by Martha and the Muffins
- "Paint by Numbers Day", from New Day New World by Spoons
- "Painted by Numbers", from Dying to Say This to You by the Sounds

== Television ==
- "Paint by Numbers", Dangerous Curves season 2, episode 6
- "Paint by Numbers", Timothy Goes to School season 1, episode 5

== Other uses ==
- Paint by Numbers, a short story by Maria V. Snyder
- Paint by Numbers, one of Michael Brown's murals of Chapel Hill
- Nonogram, a type of picture logic puzzle often called Paint by Numbers

== See also ==
- Colour by Numbers (disambiguation)
