= The Blinders =

English alternative rock band

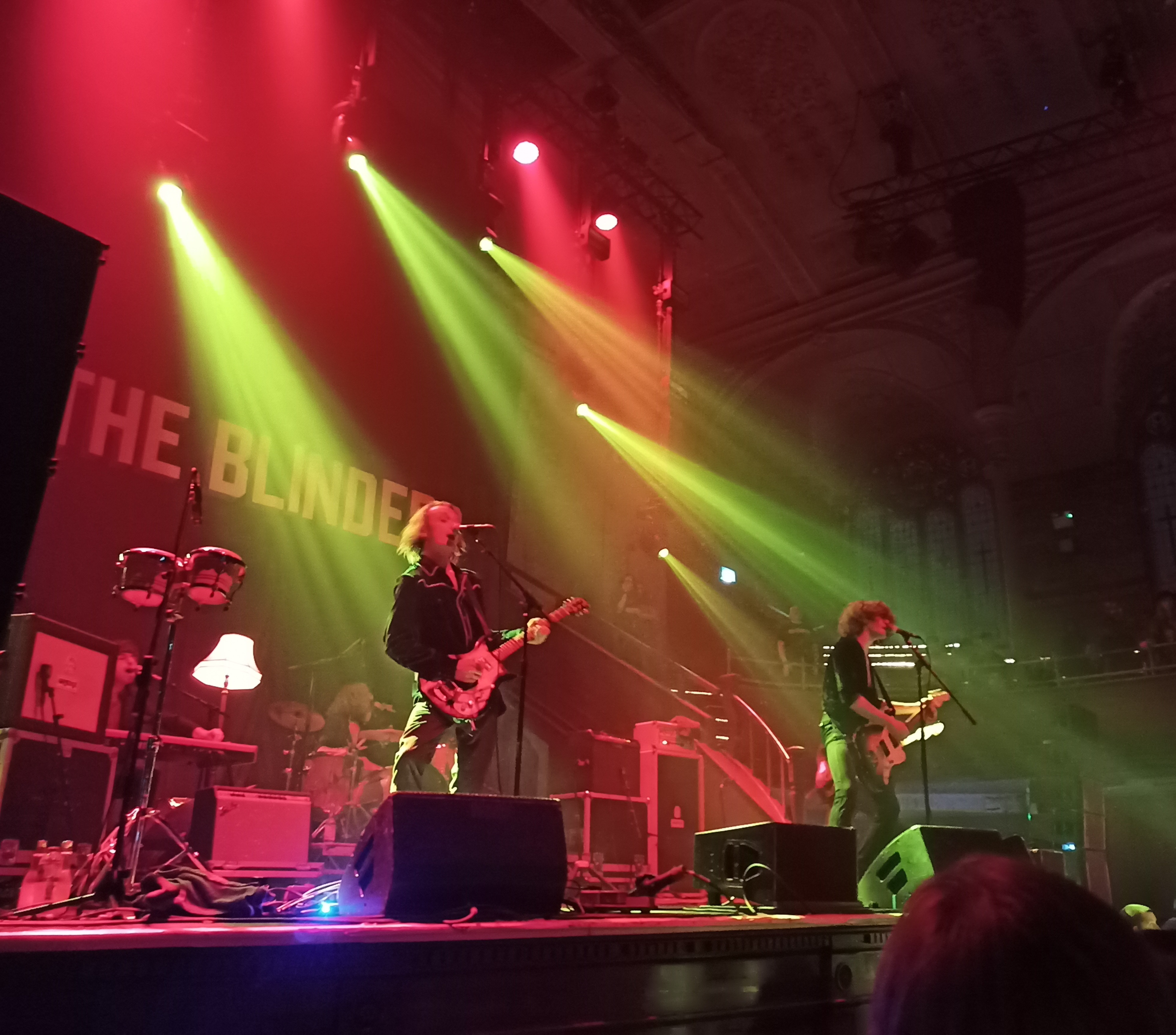

Background information
- Origin: Doncaster, England
- Genre: Alternative rock
- Years active: 2014–2024(on hiatus)
- Labels: EMI, Modern Sky, Crocodile Men Records
- Spinoffs: Tidetied
- Members: Thomas Haywood; Charlie McGough; Thomas Castrey; Johnny James
- Past members: Mat Neale; Eoghan Clifford
- Website: theblindersofficial.com

The Blinders are an English alternative rock band from Doncaster, based in Manchester. The band currently consists of vocalist and guitarist Thomas Haywood, bass guitarist Charlie McGough, drummer Thomas Castrey, and keyboardist Johnny James. They released their debut EP Hidden Horror Dance in 2016, followed by their first LP Columbia in 2018, and second LP Fantasies Of A Stay At Home Psychopath in 2020 both on Modern Sky Entertainment. Following the departure of Mat Neale in 2020, the band released Electric Kool Aid: a 2-part EP released on 17 June 2022. On 30 October 2023 the band revealed details on the new album “Beholder” which was released on 1 March 2024.

Shortly after the album's release and subsequent cancellation of the European leg of their tour, various social media posts from the band suggested that they were to take an indefinite hiatus. A message appeared on the band's official website thanking fans, stating "It's time to take a break for us" and that the band are to "take a step back [and] pursue something else for a while".

== History ==
The band was formed in 2014 while its members studied at Manchester University. They spent 2015 touring the local circuit while writing and recording their first EP which would follow in 2016.

Bass guitarist Charlie McGough spoke of the band's formation: "We all knew each other from school and had played in school bands together, so to speak. After secondary school Thomas and I went off to the same Six Form and Matt went off to some music college. Thomas then spent a couple of months nagging Matt to leave this band he was playing in and come down for a jam."

In October 2017 the band announced that they had signed to Modern Sky UK.

=== Hidden Horror Dance EP ===
On 26 May 2016, The Blinders released a four-song EP titled Hidden Horror Dance, recorded at Vibe Studio in Manchester.

=== Columbia ===
September 2018 saw the release of The Blinder's debut album Columbia. The album was produced by Gavin Monaghan (Editors, The Sherlocks, Goldblade) and was recorded in a month at his studio Magic Garden in Wolverhampton.

The album is loosely based around the concept of Columbia as "an alternate world informed by reality" and follows the fictional persona of Johnny Dream on a spiritual awakening. The album is inspired by the literary touchstones of George Orwell and Jack Kerouac as well as artists such as Nick Cave, Kanye West, and The Wytches.

Columbia also features the 2017 single "Brave New World", familiar from its use in a William Hill TV advert.

=== Live At The Ritz ===
Following the release of their debut album Columbia the band played a sold-out show at The Ritz in Manchester. The band released a live recording of the set titled Live At The Ritz, released in collaboration with Blood Records.

The album features three previously unheard songs taken from the band's forthcoming second album, entitled Fantasies of a Stay at Home Psychopath. Limited to 500 copies, the album sold out within a week of its release The Live at the Ritz album was launched at a fan event at 33 Oldham Street in Manchester on the 2 November 2019.

=== Fantasies of a Stay at Home Psychopath ===
The Blinders second studio album was released on 17 July 2020. Upon the record's completion, drummer Matthew Neale left the band for personal reasons.

=== Electric Kool Aid parts 1 and 2 ===
After Matt left the band in 2020, The Blinders de-signed from Modern Sky UK at the end of 2021 and recruited 3 more band members to complete a new lineup. They released a 2-part EP called "Electric Kool Aid", on June 17th on vinyl and digital via the band's own self-run Crocodile Men records. The first part was released on 1 January 2022, and the final part was released on 13 May 2022.

=== Beholder ===
On 30 October 2023 the Blinders announced their third album “Beholder” which was released on 1 March 2024. On the same day as the announcement guitarist Eoghan Clifford confirmed that he will be leaving the Blinders. Followed by a tour that, in a social media post by the band, was confirmed to be 'the last for a while' leaving their future unknown. The European leg of the tour was also cancelled.

== Touring ==
To date the band have toured within the UK and Europe with The Charlatans, The View, Cabbage, and Blossoms.

Alongside this, the band has a long list of festival performances under their belt, including headlining the BBC introducing stage at Reading and Leeds Festivals in 2018 and a main stage appearance at Kendal Calling.

2019 saw the band perform at South_by_Southwest and a set at Glastonbury Festival 2019 on the Leftfield Stage.

For their April 2019 UK tour The Blinders teamed up with Safe Gigs for Women, adding "Making our gigs a safe place is something we are deeply committed to as a band, and we urge anyone who sees anything untoward to speak out"

Ahead of the 2019 UK general elections the trio embarked on the 'For The Many' tour, from which all proceeds have been donated to the local Labour Party.

In a review of the band's 2024 tour in support of Beholder, journalist Dave Holgado described their performance at London's Scala as 'super tight' and that, despite the recent announcement of their impending hiatus, they 'certainly left the crowd in Scala wanting more'.

== Musical style and influences ==
The band is described as being "known for their energetic performances and politically driven lyrics, and in-your-face punk attitude". Their influences include Bob Dylan, Iggy Pop, Nick Cave and The Amazing Snakeheads. A particularly formative influence for both Charlie and Thomas came from an arena gig by Pink Floyd co-founder, Roger Waters. “We watched Roger Waters do ‘The Wall’ in Wembley and that was completely life-changing, it was theatre, it was performance,” said Thomas. Other influences they have cited include the Wytches, Queens of the Stone Age, the Strokes, the Arctic Monkeys, Cabbage, Avalanche Party, Strange Bones, John Lennon, Jim Morrison and David Bowie.

The band are most commonly categorised as alternative rock, though they have also been referred to as punk rock and new wave.

== Members ==
Current members

- Thomas Haywood - vocalist/guitarist (2014–2024)
- Charlie McGough - bass guitarist (2014–2024)
- Thomas Castrey - drums (2020–2024)
- Johnny James – keyboards (2020–2024)

Former members

- Matthew Neale - drums (2016–2020)
- Eoghan Clifford - guitarist (2020–2023)

== Discography ==
=== Studio albums ===
- Columbia (2018)
- Fantasies of a Stay at Home Psychopath (2020)
- Beholder (2024)

=== Live albums ===
- Live at The Ritz (2019)

=== Extended plays ===
- Hidden Horror Dance (2016)
- Electric Kool Aid - Part 1 (2022)
- Electric Kool Aid - Part 2 (2022)

=== Singles ===
- "ICB Blues" (2016)
- "Swine" (2016)
- "Ramona Flowers" (2017)
- "Brave New World" (2017)
- "Gotta Get Through" (2018)
- "L’Etat C’est Moi" (2018)
- "Brave New World (Radio Edit)" (2018)
- "Rat In A Cage (Radio Edit)" (2019)
- "Circle Song" (2020)
- "Forty Days and Forty Nights" (2020)
- "Lunatic With A Loaded Gun" (2020)
- "Mule Track" (2020)
- "Black Glass" (2020)
- "City We Call Love" (2021)
- "Fight For It" (2022)
- "Breaklights" (2023)
- "Always" (2023)
