= Annabel Dream Reader =

Studio album by The Wytches
- Released: 25 August 2014
- Studio: Toe Rag Studios (Hackney, London)
- Genres: Surf rock; grunge; garage rock; stoner rock
- Length: 46:45
- Label: Heavenly
- Producers: Bill Ryder-Jones; Kristian Bell

The Wytches chronology
Annabel Dream Reader (2014)	All Your Happy Life (2016)

Professional ratings
Aggregate scores
Source	Rating
Metacritic	69/100
Review scores
Source	Rating
AllMusic	3/5 stars
Consequence of Sound	C+
DIY	4/5 stars
Drowned in Sound	6/10
Exclaim!	8/10
The Guardian	3/5 stars
The Line of Best Fit	7/10
musicOMH	3.5/5 stars
NME	4/5 stars
Paste	9.1/10
Pitchfork	5.8/10

Annabel Dream Reader is the debut studio album by English rock band The Wytches. It was released on 25 August 2014 through Heavenly Recordings. Recording sessions took place over two days at Toe Rag Studios in Hackney, London. Production was handled by Bill Ryder-Jones and member Kristian Bell. The album was met with generally favorable reviews from music critics. It peaked at number 50 on the UK Albums Chart.

== Track listing ==
All tracks are written by Kristian Bell.

No.	Title	Length
1.	"Digsaw"	3:21
2.	"Wide at Midnight"	3:19
3.	"Grave Dweller"	2:48
4.	"Fragile Male for Sale"	3:47
5.	"Burn Out the Bruise"	3:14
6.	"Wire Frame Mattress"	3:47
7.	"Beehive Queen"	2:33
8.	"Weights and Ties"	4:33
9.	"Part Time Model"	3:59
10.	"Summer Again"	4:48
11.	"Robe for Juda"	4:25
12.	"Crying Clown"	3:18
13.	"Track 13"	2:53
Total length:		46:45

== Charts ==
Chart performance for Annabel Dream Reader
Chart (2014)	Peak position
UK Albums (Official Charts)	50
UK Independent Albums (Official Charts)	15
