= Ditz (band) =

English rock band

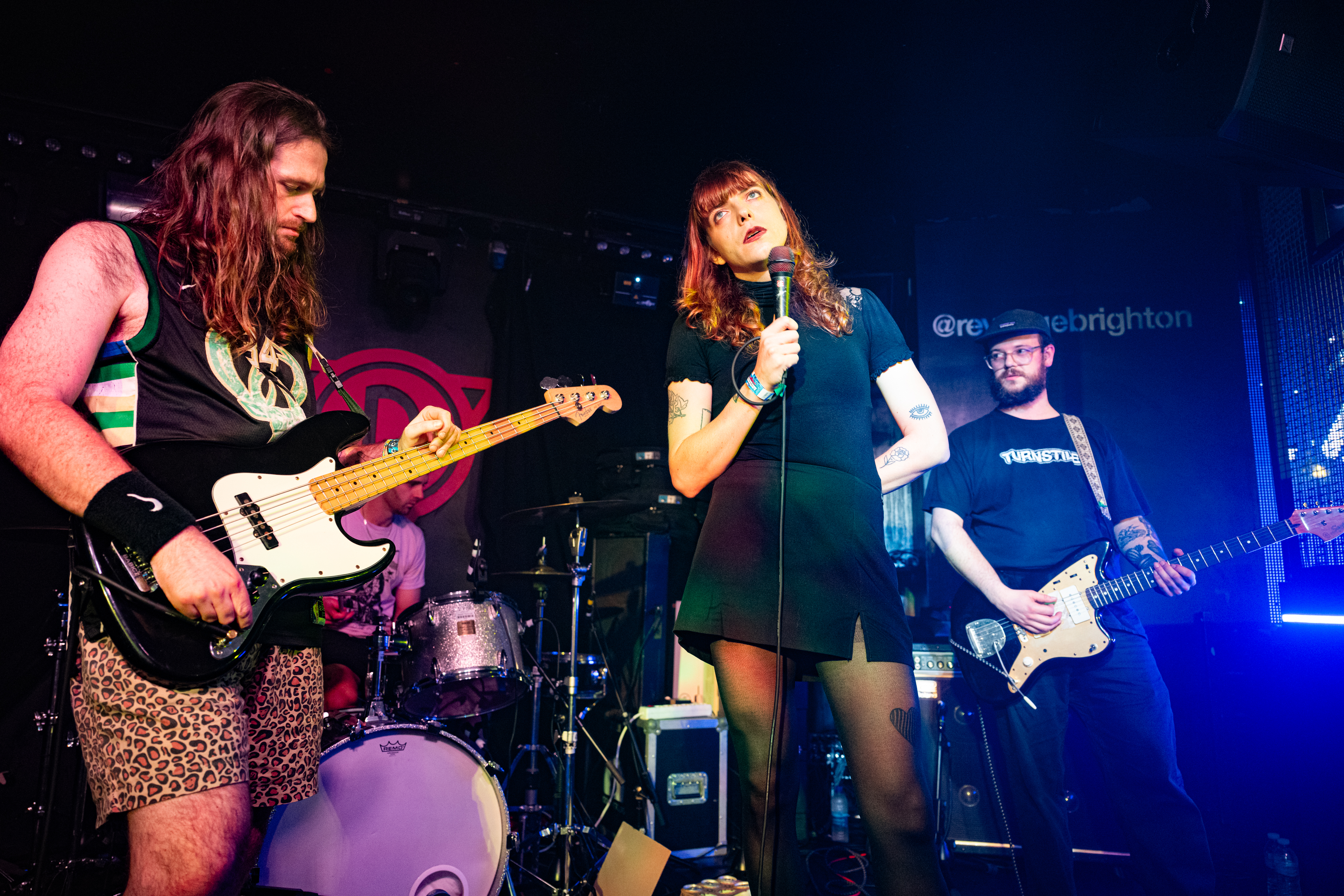
- At Mutations Festival, Brighton UK, 7 November 2025

Background information
- Origin: Brighton, England
- Genres: Hardcore punk; post-punk
- Years active: 2016–present
- Labels: Permanent Creeps; Alcopop!; Suicide Squeeze; Republic Of Music
- Members: Cal Francis; Caleb Remnant; Anton Mocock; Jack Looker; Samuel Evans
- Past members: Archie Brewis-Lawes; Myles Waring
- Website: ditzband.com

Ditz (often stylised DITZ) are an English rock band that formed in Brighton in 2016. The band consists of Cal Francis (vocals), Caleb Remnant (bass), Anton Mocock (Guitar), Jack Looker (Guitar), Sam Evans (Drums).

== Background ==
The band formed in 2016 in Brighton, with the members being involved in the various music scenes in the city. The original founders, Cal Francis, and Caleb Remnant grew up together in Gloucestershire, and had tried to form bands with limited success. Later that year, Mocock joined the band followed by then drummer Looker in 2016, with Evans finalising the lineup in early 2019.

In 2020, the band released their EP, 5 Songs, which included a collection of singles previously released in 2018 to 2019. Around this time, the band signed on to Alcopop! Records. In 2022, they released their debut studio album, The Great Regression, which was met to critical acclaim.

The band's sophomore studio album, Never Exhale, was independently released in 2025.

== Style ==
The band has been compared to Blacklisters, Lightning Bolt, Metz, Ought, IDLES, Yak, Daughters and Gilla Band.

== Discography ==
=== Studio albums ===
- The Great Regression (2022)
- Never Exhale (2025)

=== Live albums ===
- On the Bai'ou - Live from the Louisiana (2023)

=== Extended plays ===
- EP1 (2016)
- 5 Songs (2020)

=== Singles ===
- "Rupert Grint" (2016)
- "Seeking Arrangement" (2018)
- "Gayboy" (2019)
- "Total 90" (2019)
- "Role Model" (2020)
- "Fuck the Pain Away" (2020)
- "Ded Würst" (2021)
- "The Warden" (2021)
- "I Am Kate Moss" (2022)
- "Summer of the Shark" (2022)
- "Riverstone" (2023)
- "Space/Smile" (2024)
- "Taxi Man" (2024)
- "Four" (2025)
