= BC Camplight =

American songwriter

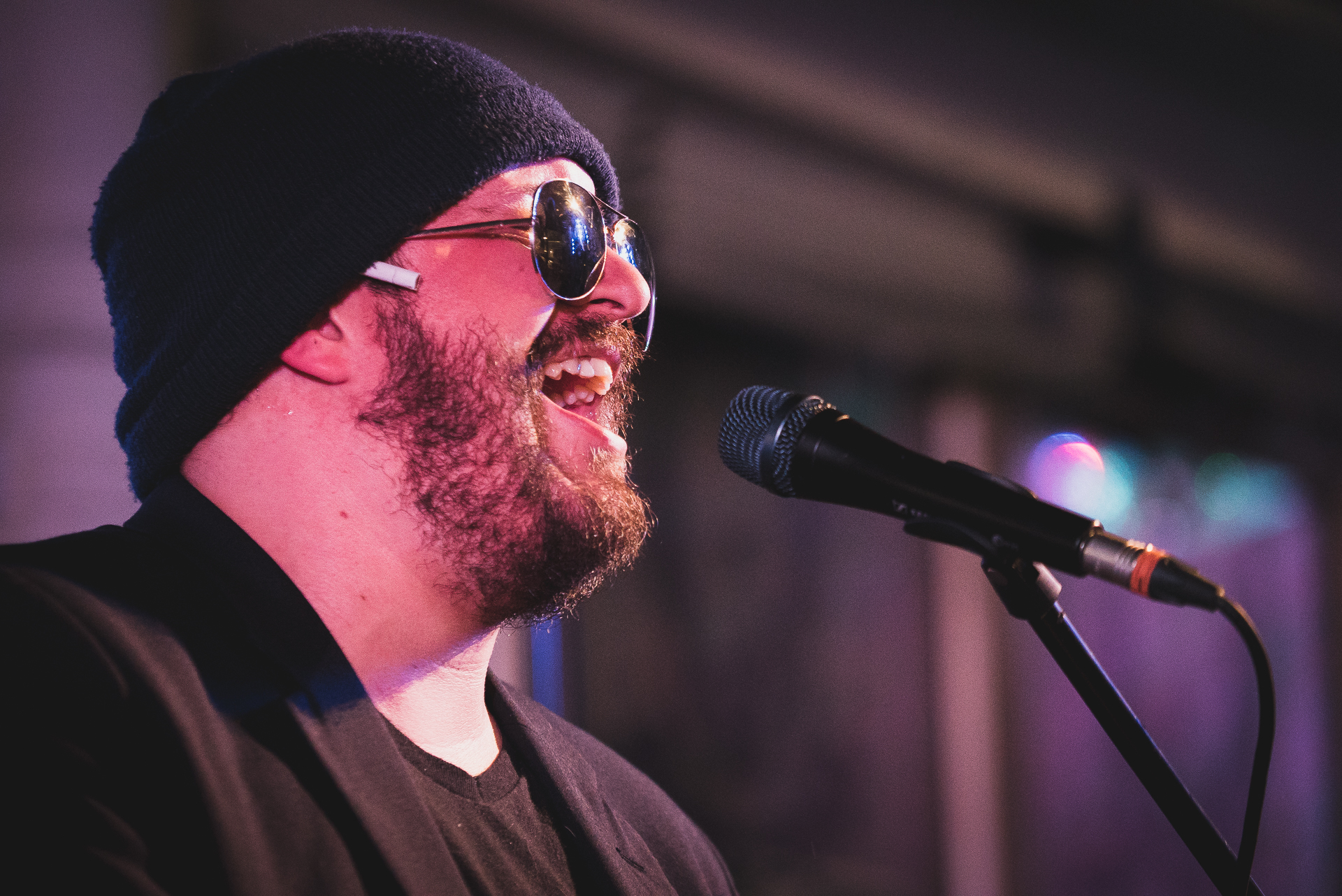
- BC Camplight performing in 2016

Background information
- Born: Brian James Christinzio; 31 May 1979 (age 47); New Jersey, United States
- Genres: Indie rock, lo-fi
- Occupations: Singer-songwriter, musician
- Years active: 2002–present
- Labels: One Little Indian, Bella Union
- Website: bccamplight.co.uk

Brian James Christinzio (born May 31, 1979), known professionally as BC Camplight, is a Manchester-based American songwriter and multi-instrumentalist.

His 2005 album Hide, Run Away was released by One Little Indian and featured Cynthia G. Mason on vocals. Camplight's follow-up, Blink of a Nihilist, was released in 2007, and his third album came out in January 2015 on Bella Union. Christinzio's later lyrics regularly explore his personal life and self-destructive tendencies, including struggles with depression and alcohol.

== Biography ==
Originally from Wenonah, New Jersey, Christinzio relocated to Philadelphia, Pennsylvania, United States, in 2003. He soon signed a record deal with One Little Indian and established himself on the city's live music scene. He played live with members of The War on Drugs and appeared as a session piano player on Sharon Van Etten's 2011 album Epic, among other collaborations.

Under the One Little Indian record label, Christinzio released two albums, one in 2005 and another in 2007. Although they garnered critical acclaim, the albums did not achieve commercial success. He was dropped by the label and nearly quit music altogether while struggling with mental health issues, drugs and alcohol.

Christinzio relocated to Manchester, England in 2012, following the advice of a fan on social media. There he recuperated and returned to writing and performing. In October 2014 Bella Union announced it would be releasing BC Camplight's already-recorded third album, How to Die in the North, in January 2015.

However, in early 2015 Christinzio overstayed his visa permissions due to a severe leg injury and was made to leave the UK, resulting in the cancellation of his band's summer tour which was to include performances at the Green Man and End of the Road festivals and an appearance on Later... with Jools Holland. Gigs in other countries went ahead as planned, including a debut tour in the US. Christinzio temporarily resided in Paris and Philadelphia. In the spring of 2016, he toured the West Coast of America for the first time. He then re-settled in Manchester with an Italian passport, care of his grandparents, and has since been granted a permanent Settled status.

In 2017 Christinzio recorded a new album, Deportation Blues, released on Bella Union in summer 2018. Some of the album chronicled his experience with the UK immigration system. His most successful at the time, the release was nonetheless followed by another difficult personal period, including the sudden loss of Christinzio's father.

In April 2020 BC Camplight released his fifth album, Shortly After Takeoff, again on Bella Union. It marked the completion of his so-called "'Manchester Trilogy", which also includes his previous two albums released on the same label. It became Christinzio's most commercial and critically-successful record to date, with The Guardian calling it "a masterpiece".

Up to 2021, the BC live band consisted of Christinzio (piano/vocals), Luke Barton (vocals/synth/guitar), Stephen Mutch (bass), Thom Bellini (guitar), Adam Dawson (drums) and Francesca Pidgeon (vocals/synth/percussion/saxophone).

In May 2023, Christinzio released The Last Rotation of Earth, an album written after the breakup of his long-term relationship. The album peaked at number 31 on the UK Albums Chart. The release of the album was followed by both solo and full-band tours, with the band consisting of longtime members Adam Dawson, Luke Barton, Francesca Pidgeon and Thom Bellini, with the new addition of multi-instrumentalist Jolan Lewis.

On April 8, 2025, BC Camplight announced his seventh studio album A Sober Conversation with new single "Two Legged Dog" featuring vocals from Abigail Morris of The Last Dinner Party. The subsequent full band tour saw Adam Dawson continuing on drums, Thom Bellini moving to bass, Jolan Lewis on guitar, keyboards and vocals, with new additions Peaness' Jess Branney on guitar and vocals, and James Davis on keyboards and saxophone

== Discography ==
Studio albums

- Hide, Run Away (One Little Indian, 2005)
- Blink of a Nihilist (One Little Indian, 2007)
- How to Die in the North (Bella Union, 2015)
- Deportation Blues (Bella Union, 2018)
- Shortly After Takeoff (Bella Union, 2020)
- The Last Rotation of Earth (Bella Union, 2023)
- A Sober Conversation (Bella Union, 2025)
