= A Sober Conversation =

Studio album by BC Camplight
- Released: June 27, 2025
- Genre: Pop
- Length: 35:20
- Label: Bella Union

BC Camplight chronology
The Last Rotation of Earth (2023)	A Sober Conversation (2025)

Singles from A Sober Conversation
- 1. "Two Legged Dog" Released: April 4, 2025

A Sober Conversation is the seventh studio album by American songwriter and multi-instrumentalist BC Camplight. It was released on June 27, 2025, via Bella Union in vinyl, CD and digital formats.

== Background ==
Consisting of tracks ranging between two and four minutes, with a total runtime of approximately thirty-five minutes, the album was noted as a pop album.

Succeeding Camplight's 2023 project, The Last Rotation of Earth, the album features the lead single, "Two Legged Dog", a collaboration with British rock band The Last Dinner Party's lead vocalist Abigail Morris, which was released on April 4, 2025.

== Reception ==
Professional ratings
Review scores
Source	Rating
AllMusic	4/5 stars
The Guardian	4/5 stars
Mojo	4/5 stars
MusicOMH	4.5/5 stars

The album received a four and a half-star rating from British online magazine MusicOMH's reviewer Ben Hogwood, who remarked that Camplight reflected on past abuse he experienced in his early years more "directly" on A Sober Conversation than on his previous albums.

AllMusic noted the album as relating to "youthful trauma", noting it as "a top-shelf pop album that also has something important to tell us."

The Guardian assigned it a rating of four stars and described it as "an eccentric rock opera about repression, depression and anger told with the meta-theatrical, tragicomic style that has won Christinzio a cult following."

Tom Doyle of Mojo rated the album four stars and remarked, "Ultimately, A Sober Conversation amounts to a brilliant and bold record that is all the more powerful for its deployment of life-affirming grooves and melodies."

== Track listing ==
A Sober Conversation track listing
No.	Title	Length
1.	"The Tent"	4:49
2.	"Two-Legged Dog"	4:26
3.	"A Sober Conversation"	4:04
4.	"When I Make My First Million"	3:51
5.	"Where You Taking My Baby?"	4:33
6.	"Bubbles in the Gasoline"	3:44
7.	"Rock Gently in Disorder"	3:41
8.	"Drunk Talk"	3:57
9.	"Leaving Camp Four Oaks"	2:15
Total length:		35:20

== Personnel ==
Credits for A Sober Conversation adapted from AllMusic.

- Daniel Woodward – engineer, producer
- Robert Whiteley – engineer
- James Bragg – mastering
- Brian Christinzio – arranger, bass, composer, guitars, organ, piano, producer, synthesizer, vocals
- Abigail Morris – vocals
- Thom Bellini – electric guitar, background vocals
- Jolan Lewis – clavinet, acoustic guitar, electric guitar, organ, synthesizer, synthesizer bass, background vocals
- Jess Branney – effects, percussion, vibraslap, vocals
- Adam Dawson – drums
- Alexander Huxley – trumpet
- Callum McMorran – flute
- Evelyn Halls – cello
- Luke Jarvis – design
- Matt Lawton – upright bass
- Rachel Nicholas – viola
- Sidonie Hand-Halford – drums, percussion
- Tom Spencer – trombone
- Marieke Macklon – cover photo

== Charts ==
Chart performance for A Sober Conversation
Chart (2025)	Peak position
Scottish Albums (OCC)	5
UK Albums (OCC)	61
UK Independent Albums (OCC)	3
