= All Your Happy Life =

Studio album by The Wytches
- Released: 30 September 2016
- Studio: Chapel Studios (South Thoresby, Lincolnshire); Toe Rag Studios (Hackney, London)
- Genre: Garage punk; alternative rock; indie rock
- Length: 36:03
- Label: Heavenly Recordings
- Producer: The Wytches; Jim Sclavunos; Luke Oldfield

The Wytches chronology
Annabel Dream Reader (2014)	All Your Happy Life (2016)	Three Mile Ditch (2020)

All Your Happy Life is the second studio album by English rock band The Wytches. It was released on 30 September 2016 via Heavenly Recordings. Recording sessions took place at Chapel Studios in South Thoresby, Lincolnshire and at Toe Rag Studios in Hackney, London. Production was handled by the Wytches, Luke Oldfield and Jim Sclavunos.

== Critical reception ==
Professional ratings
Aggregate scores
Source	Rating
AnyDecentMusic?	6.7/10
Metacritic	76/100
Review scores
Source	Rating
AllMusic	3.5/5 stars
Crack Magazine	6/10
DIY	4/5 stars
Dork	4/5 stars
The Line of Best Fit	7/10
Loud and Quiet	6/10
Record Collector	3/5 stars
The Spill Magazine	3.5/5 stars

All Your Happy Life was met with generally favorable reviews from music critics. At Metacritic, which assigns a normalized rating out of 100 to reviews from mainstream publications, the album received an average score of 76 based on seven reviews. The aggregator AnyDecentMusic? has the critical consensus of the album at a 6.7 out of 10, based on nine reviews.

Emma Swann of DIY describes the album "gloomy, grey but definitely not dull" adding "The Wytches have cast another stellar spell". AllMusic's Timothy Monger called it "a challenging listen but there's plenty of craft here, making it an improvement upon their debut". Ryan Lunn of The Line of Best Fit wrote: "They never really embrace as much lyrical darkness as they did on their debut album, though, and they don't exactly reach for the occasional glimpse of light either. As a result, All Your Happy Life is a lightswitch that keeps awkwardly flickering, intentionally making the mise-en-scène as unsettling as possible".

In mixed reviews, Sammy Jones of Crack Magazine stated: "a leap forward for a band that's still dripping with potential". Joe Goggins of Loud and Quiet said: "They still haven't quite figured out how to channel the raw energy they conjure up so readily onstage into the sort of nervous tension that might suit their songwriting style better". Jake Kennedy of Record Collector said: "slower, heavier and maybe a little bit more messed up than before, while not stabbing at the same loud/quiet buttons, All Your Happy Life is a most welcome, if mildly unhinged continuation".

== Track listing ==
All tracks are written by The Wytches and Mark Breed.

No.	Title	Producer(s)	Length
1.	"Intro"	The Wytches; Luke Oldfield	0:24
2.	"C-Side"	The Wytches; Luke Oldfield	3:18
3.	"Can't Face It"	The Wytches; Luke Oldfield	4:18
4.	"A Feeling We Get"	The Wytches; Luke Oldfield	3:28
5.	"Throned"	Jim Sclavunos	2:49
6.	"Ghost House"	The Wytches; Luke Oldfield	4:03
7.	"Bone-Weary"	Jim Sclavunos	3:19
8.	"Crest of Death"	Jim Sclavunos	2:55
9.	"A Dead Night Again"	Jim Sclavunos	1:57
10.	"Dumb-Fill"	The Wytches; Luke Oldfield	5:34
11.	"Home"	Jim Sclavunos	3:58
Total length:			36:03

== Personnel ==
- Kristian Bell – main artist, vocals, guitar, organ, percussion, songwriter, producer (tracks: 1–4, 6, 10), arranger (tracks: 2, 7)
- Dan Rumsey – main artist, backing vocals, bass, songwriter, producer (tracks: 1–4, 6, 10), arranger (tracks: 2, 7)
- Gianni Honey – main artist, drums, percussion, songwriter, producer (tracks: 1–4, 6, 10), arranger (tracks: 2, 7)
- Mark Breed – organ & mellotron (tracks: 2, 6, 11), piano (track 10), additional songwriter
- Jim Sclavunos – producer (tracks: 5, 7–9, 11), arranger (tracks: 2, 7), mixing (tracks: 8, 9)
- Luke Oldfield – producer & recording (tracks: 1–4, 6, 10)
- Mikey Young – mixing (tracks: 1–7, 10, 11), mastering
- Tim Morris – recording (tracks: 5, 7–9, 11)
- Guy Davie – additional mastering
- Samuel Gull – artwork
- Tim Hampson – layout

== Charts ==
Chart performance for All Your Happy Life
Chart (2016)	Peak position
UK Independent Albums (OCC)	23
UK Vinyl Albums (OCC)	20
UK Record Store (OCC)	7
