= Colour by Numbers (Freeze the Atlantic EP) =

EP by Freeze the Atlantic
- Released: 18 April 2011
- Genre: Alternative rock, pop punk
- Length: 8:20
- Label: Alcopop! Records

Freeze the Atlantic chronology
Colour by Numbers (2011)	Speakeasy (2012)

Professional ratings
Review scores
Source	Rating
Alter The Press	4/5 stars

Colour by Numbers is the debut release from the alternative rock band Freeze the Atlantic.

== Track listing ==
All music is composed by Freeze the Atlantic.

No.	Title	Length
1.	"Waking Up"	3:10
2.	"The Alibi"	2:20
3.	"Broken Bones (Acoustic)"	2:50
Total length:		8:20

== Personnel ==
Freeze the Atlantic

- Jon Pearce - bass
- Guy Davis - drums
- Chris Knott - vocals
- Andy Gilmour - guitar
- Tom Stevens - guitar
