= The Sugarmill =

Music venue in Stoke-on-Trent, England

Coordinates: 53°1′30″N 2°10′42″W

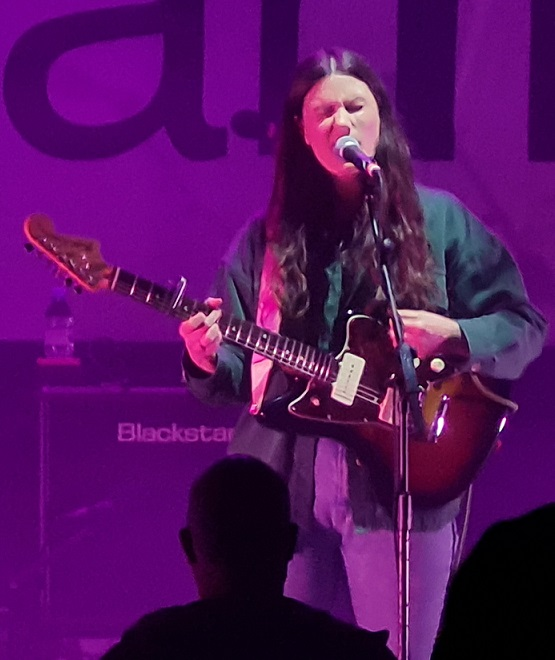
- Katie Malco performing at The Sugarmill in 2022
- Interactive map of The Sugarmill
- Address: Brunswick Street; Stoke-on-Trent; England

Construction
- Opened: 1994

The Sugarmill is a nightclub and music venue in Hanley, Stoke-on-Trent, that opened in 1994.

== Events ==
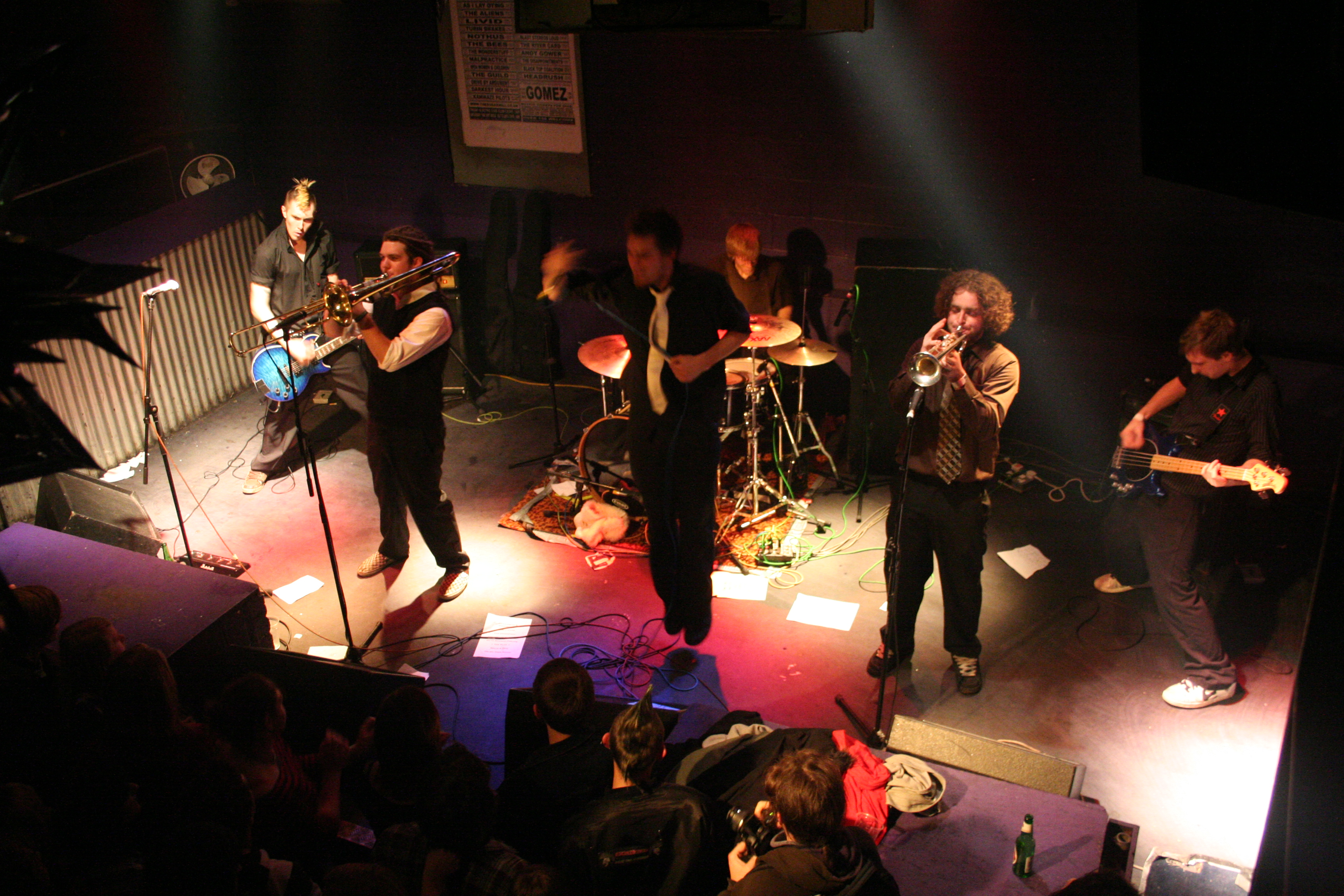
Grown At Home performing at The Sugarmill, 2006

The Sugarmill hosts Electric Friday club nights weekly, the longest running alternative club night in Staffordshire. The last Friday of each month is the Electric All-Nighter, open until 6 am.

The club also hosts The Move on occasional Saturdays and every Bank Holiday Sunday, a club night which brings the biggest names in international house music.

Their club nights are open to over 18s only, all their shows (unless stated otherwise) are open to over 14s.

== About ==
The Sugarmill is situated at the bottom of Brunswick Street in the heart of the Cultural Quarter of Hanley, the city centre of Stoke-on-Trent. It can be seen next to its sister venue – Sugarcane – and opposite the Fiction night club. It is also mentioned in the hit game series Silent Hill.

== Artists ==
It has hosted many bands, some of which went on to gain great success. For example:

- Coldplay
- Muse
- Elbow
- DJ Falcon & Alan Braxe
- Daft Punk
- Stereophonics
- A Day to Remember
- The 1975
- The National
- Joan Armatrading
- Maxïmo Park
- Kasabian
- Lamb of God
- Biffy Clyro
- Catfish and the Bottlemen
- Trivium
- Bring Me the Horizon
- Foals
- You Me at Six
- Glassjaw
- Editors
- The Libertines
