= Three Mile Ditch =

Studio album by The Wytches
- Released: 13 November 2020
- Recorded: Autumn 2019
- Studio: Tile House Studios (London, UK)
- Genre: Surf rock; hard rock
- Length: 42:08
- Label: Cable Code Records
- Producer: Luke Oldfield; The Wytches

The Wytches chronology
All Your Happy Life (2016)	Three Mile Ditch (2020)	Our Guest Can't Be Named (2023)

Three Mile Ditch is the third studio album by English rock band The Wytches. It was released on 13 November 2020 through Cable Code Records. Recording sessions took place at Tile House Studios in London during Autumn 2019.

In the United Kingdom, the album peaked at number 6 on the Record Store Chart, number 38 on the Independent Albums Chart and number 8 on the Independent Album Breakers Chart.

== Critical reception ==
Professional ratings
Aggregate scores
Source	Rating
Metacritic	79/100
Review scores
Source	Rating
Beats Per Minute	78%
Classic Rock	8/10
DIY	3/5 stars
Gigwise	9/10 stars
The Line of Best Fit	8.5/10

Three Mile Ditch was met with generally favourable reviews from music critics. At Metacritic, which assigns a normalized rating out of 100 to reviews from mainstream publications, the album received an average score of 79 based on four reviews.

Cameron Sinclair-Harris of Gigwise praised the album, giving it nearly perfect 9 out of 10 score. Susan Hansen of The Line of Best Fit called the album "raw and absorbing", adding "it deserves our full attention". Classic Rock reviewer labelled the work as "a spellbynding brew". Ana Leorne of Beats Per Minute stated: "Three Mile Ditch is living proof that lightning does indeed strike the same place twice — and sometimes with a vengeance. Rumours of their death have been highly exaggerated, as The Wytches have never felt so alive". In her mixed review for DIY, Lisa Wright wrote: "the signs for the band's third aren't too rosy, and yet their latest does go some way to showing the defter touch they first struck out with".

== Track listing ==
All tracks are written by Kristian Bell, except 1, 2, 4, and 7 written with the Wytches.

No.	Title	Length
1.	"Cowboy"	4:28
2.	"Three Mile Ditch"	3:59
3.	"Midnight Ride"	5:07
4.	"Fly Inside"	3:17
5.	"A Love You'll Never Know"	4:15
6.	"Meat Chuck"	4:33
7.	"Everyone's Friend"	3:14
8.	"White Cliffs"	3:36
9.	"Silver Trees"	4:04
10.	"You Looked Happy To Me"	5:31

== Personnel ==
- Kristian Bell – vocals, lyrics, guitar, drums, mellotron, Rhodes
- Dan Rumsey – bass, drums, guitar
- Mark Breed – guitar, bass, drums, Hammond, mellotron
- Luke Oldfield – piano, tambourine, farfisa, whistle, mellotron, warpspeed, recording, mixing
- Noel Summerville – mastering
- Samuel Gull – artwork, design

== Charts ==
Chart (2020)	Peak position
UK Record Store (OCC)	6
UK Independent Albums (OCC)	38
UK Independent Album Breakers Chart (OCC)	8
