= Cynthia G. Mason =

American songwriter

Cynthia G. Mason is a songwriter based in Philadelphia, Pennsylvania. She self-released albums (as cassettes) on her own label, Spiderwoman. She was featured on the cover of the Philadelphia City Paper and her version of Richard Buckner's "Surprise, AZ" was included on a compilation of covers produced by The Believer magazine. In January 2007, she released her first nationally distributed album, Quitter's Claim, on the High Two label. The album was produced by and features guitarist Larry D. Brown, who records under the Grey Reverend moniker and is a member of The Cinematic Orchestra. She also sings on BC Camplight's 2005 album Hide, Run Away on the One Little Indian label.
