= Freeze the Atlantic =

English alternative rock band

- Origin: Farnborough, Hampshire, England
- Genres: Alternative rock, emo
- Years active: 2008–2018
- Label: Alcopop! Records
- Spinoff of: Reuben, Hundred Reasons
- Members: Guy Davis; Liv Puente; Andy Gilmour; Tom Stevens; Jon Pearce
- Past members: Daniel Flay; Chris Knott; Sean Shreeve
- Website: freezetheatlantic.co.uk

Freeze the Atlantic were an English alternative rock band based in Farnborough, Hampshire. The band were formed in late 2008 by Guy Davis, Jon Pearce and Andy Gilmour following the hiatus of both Reuben and Hundred Reasons. The group's name is taken from a song by English alternative rock band Cable from their 1997 album, When Animals Attack.

The band announced their split in September 2018.

== History ==
=== Formation and debut EP ===
Started initially by Andy Gilmour with Jon Pearce and Guy Davis following the hiatus of both Reuben and Hundred Reasons, the band then recruited second guitarist Tom Stevens (formerly of Archie & the Instincts). The band placed instrumental demos on Myspace to help audition for a vocalist, and in 2009 Daniel Flay (The Travis Waltons) joined the band. Although not appearing on any official releases, Flay did record several demos of songs that would eventually find official release. In 2010 Flay left the band and Chris J Knott was swiftly brought in on vocals to complete the line-up. The band spent much of the next 2 years touring the UK. Jon Pearce left the group in 2010 and was replaced by Sean Shreeve. In 2011 the band released their debut EP, Colour by Numbers was released on Alcopop! Records.

=== Speakeasy ===
Freeze the Atlantic's debut album Speakeasy was released the following year featuring Colin Doran of Hundred Reasons and JP Reid of Sucioperro/Marmaduke Duke as guest vocalists. The album's lead single Volcanoes would feature Liv Puente of Laruso as a guest vocalist. Liv Puente would go on to join the band permanently after Chris Knott departed in late 2012.

=== Second album ===
In 2013, Freeze the Atlantic began work on their second studio album. The band announced that the album would be self-titled and "Stompbox" would be the first single to be released from the album. Freeze the Atlantic was released on 16 June 2014 to positive reviews, with former vocalist Chris Knott making a guest appearance on the album. It was announced in November 2014 that Sean Shreeve would be departing the band to focus on other projects with original bass player Jon Pearce returning to the line-up as his full-time replacement.

The songs "welcome back to nibelheim" and "stompbox" were featured in S3:E11 "that's too much, man!" of the TV show Bojack Horseman

=== Third album ===
The People Are Revolting – Alcopop! Records (2017) was the band's third studio album with 11 tracks including the anthemic namesake "The People Are Revolting."

=== Split ===
On 26 September 2018 the band announced on Instagram that they were splitting up. They played their final gig on 20 October 2018, which was also their 10-year anniversary show.

== Band members ==
Current

- Guy Davis – drums (2008–2018)
- Andy Gilmour – guitar (2008–2018)
- Tom Stevens – guitar (2008–2018)
- Jon Pearce – bass (2008–2010) (2014–2018)
- Liv Puente – vocals (2012–2018)

Former

- Daniel Flay – vocals (2009–2010)
- Chris Knott – vocals (2010–2012)
- Sean Shreeve – bass (2010–2014)

== Discography ==
=== Studio albums ===
- Speakeasy – Alcopop! Records (2012)
- Freeze the Atlantic – Alcopop! Records (2014)
- The People Are Revolting – Alcopop! Records (2017)

=== EPs ===
- Colour by Numbers – Alcopop! Records (2011)

=== Splits ===
- Samoans / Freeze the Atlantic (Split with Samoans) – Apres Vous Records (2015)

=== Music videos ===
- "Waking Up" (2011)
- "Volcanoes" (2012)
- "This Fight" (2012)
- "Shivering & Dazed" (2013)
- "Stompbox" (2014)
- "The Last Great Train Robbery" (2015)
