= Katie Malco =

British singer-songwriter

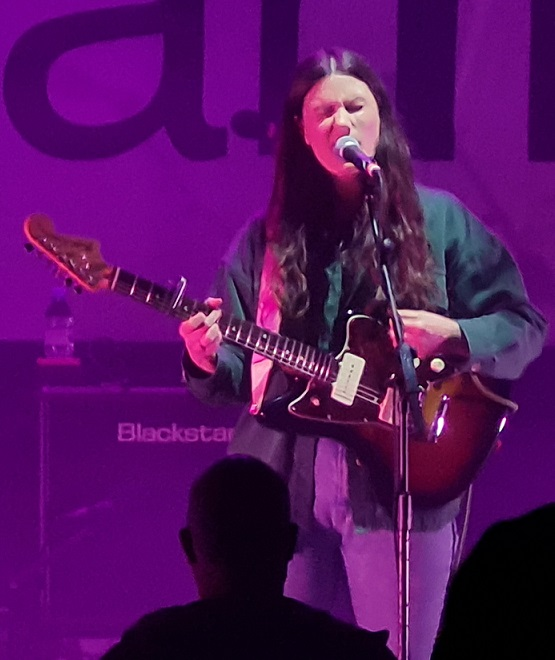
- Malco at Stoke Sugarmill in 2022 supporting Bob Mould

Background information
- Also known as: Kate Malco
- Born: Katie Anne Malcolmson
- Genres: Folk rock, indie rock
- Occupation: Musician
- Instruments: guitar, vocals, piano
- Website: http://www.katiemalco.com

Katie Malcolmson, known professionally as Katie Malco, is a British indie rock musician based in Northampton, England.

== Career ==
Malco began her career releasing an EP in 2011 titled Katie Malco and the Slow Parade on Alcopop! Records. Malco released her second EP in 2013 titled Tearing Ventricles. In 2020, Malco signed to Richmond, Virginia-based record label 6131 Records. Her debut album, Failures, was released through the label on 5 June 2020. The album was one of NPR Music's "Best New Albums" upon the week of its release. Malco has toured with Julien Baker, Alvvays, Jenny Lewis, Bob Mould, Fenne Lily, Dawes, Hurray for the Riff Raff, Laura Stevenson, Medium Build and Peter Buck (R.E.M.), as well as opening for The Lumineers at their 2023 Crystal Palace Park show. Malco released a new single in 2024 featuring Laura Stevenson, called Fatal Attraction.

== Personal life ==
Malco was born in Dunfermline, Fife to Scottish parents. She, her parents and her siblings moved to Northampton when she was a child.

== Discography ==
=== Studio albums ===
Year	Title	Label	Format
2020	Failures	6131 Records	12" vinyl LP, CD, Digital

=== EPs ===
Year	Title	Label	Format
2024	Failures Remixed	6131 Records	Digital
2022	Failures Revisited	6131 Records	Digital
2013	Tearing Ventricles	Alcopop! Records	12" vinyl EP, Digital
2011	ThreEPeople (with Matt Emery and Warren Mallia)	Alcopop! Records	Digital
2011	Katie Malco and the Slow Parade	Alcopop! Records	Digital
2010	Four Goodbyes	Tree Bone Records	Digital

=== Singles ===
Year	Title	Associated EP or Album	Label	Format
2016	Be Good At Christmas	None	6131 Records	Digital
2019	Creatures	Failures	6131 Records	Digital
2019	Colorblind (with S.T. Manville)	None	Difficult	Digital
2020	Animal	Failures	6131 Records	Digital
2020	Brooklyn	Failures	6131 Records	Digital
2020	Fractures	Failures	6131 Records	Digital
2021	Cloudbusting (Kate Bush Cover)	None	6131 Records	Digital
2021	The First Snow (Alternate Version)	Failures Revisited	6131 Records	Digital
2022	Creatures (Alternate Version)	Failures Revisited	6131 Records	Digital
2022	Brooklyn (Alternate Version)	Failures Revisited	6131 Records	Digital
2022	Animal (Alternate Version)	Failures Revisited	6131 Records	Digital
2022	Let's Go To War (Alternate Version)	Failures Revisited	6131 Records	Digital
2022	Fractures (Alternate Version)	Failures Revisited	6131 Records	Digital
2024	Fatal Attraction (with Laura Stevenson)	None	Katie Malco	Digital
2024	Babette (with SOAK)	None	Katie Malco	Digital
2025	Auld Lang Syne (Robert Burns Cover)	None	Katie Malco	Digital
