= The Wytches =

English rock band

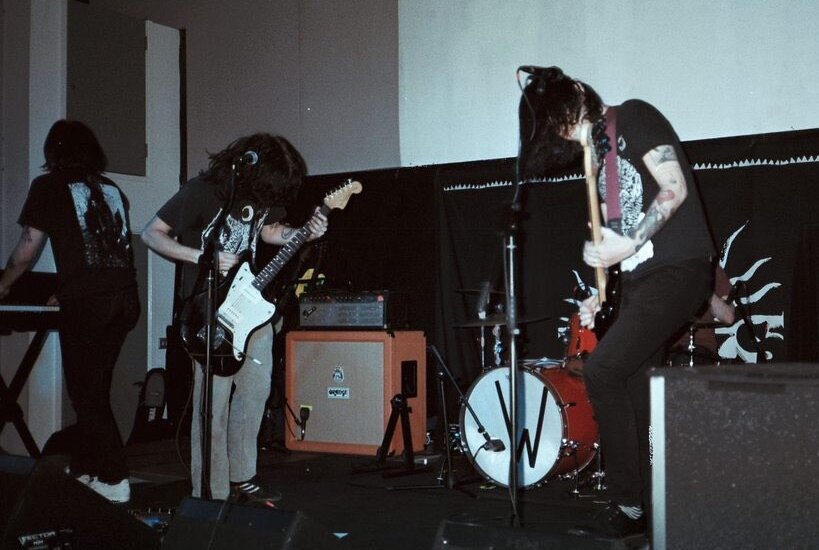
- The Wytches - John Peel Centre, Stowmarket, in 2016

Background information
- Also known as: The Witches (2011–2012)
- Origin: Peterborough, Cambridgeshire, UK
- Genres: Surf rock; psychedelic rock; grunge; stoner rock; post-punk
- Years active: 2011–present
- Labels: Hate Hate Hate; Heavenly; Partisan; Cable Code; Alcopop!
- Members: Kristian Bell; Daniel Rumsey; Mark Breed; Bhavin Thaker
- Past members: Gianni Honey; Demelza Mather
- Website: Official Site

The Wytches are an English rock band founded in 2011. Formed in Peterborough, as the Witches, by Kristian Bell (guitar/vocals), Gianni Hone (drums) and Mark Breed (bass), the band relocated to Brighton within a year. Breed did not move to the city with his bandmates, leading them to hire Daniel Rumsey and in 2012 changed their name's spelling to the Wytches. Their fusion of surf rock, psychedelic rock, grunge and stoner rock established as one of the most prominent acts in the latter years of the 2010s grunge revival. They released their debut single "Beehive Queen" in June 2013, follow up the Thunder Lizard Revisited EP in September, then single "Robe for Juda" in November. Their debut full-length Annabel Dream Reader was released by Heavenly Recordings in 2014, followed by All Your Happy Life in 2016, their first album with Mark Breed rejoining, now as guitarist. Honey departed from the band in 2019, replaced by Demelza Mather. Their next to albums were Three Mile Ditch (2020) and Our Guest Can't Be Named (2023). In 2024, they hired Bhavin Thaker to fill Mather's role then released their fifth album Talking Machine in 2025.

== History ==
=== Formation and early releases (2011–2013) ===
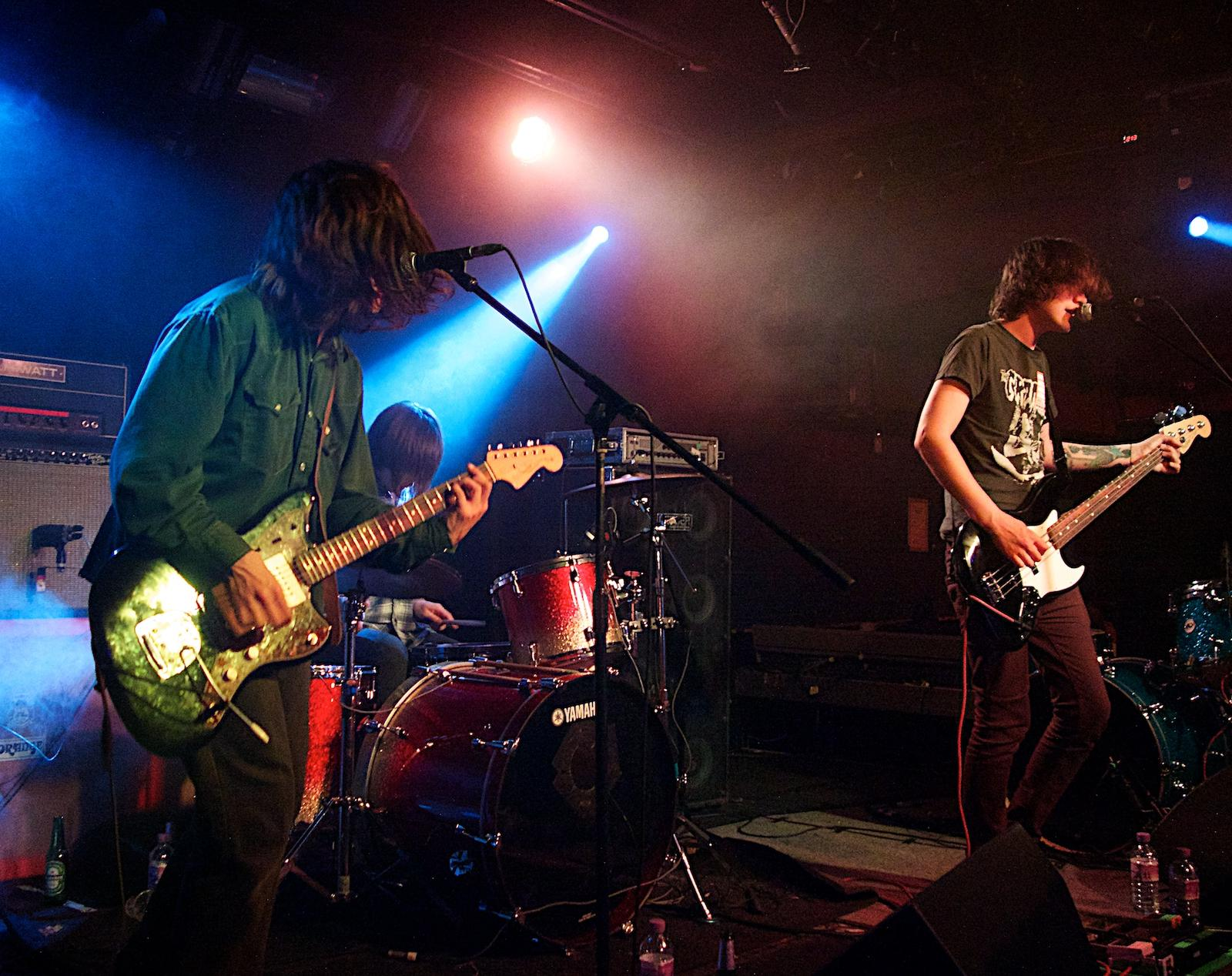
The Wytches performing in 2013

Kristian Bell and Gianni Honey had previously played together in the Crooked Canes in their hometown of Peterborough. The Wytches was formed by Kristian Bell (guitar/vocals), Gianni Hone (drums) and Mark Breed (bass) in Peterborough. Breed soon moved to guitar. They initially named the band the Witches, "We just wanted it to be one of those standard sort of names, y’know? Like the Hives [or] the Vines", and "'it sounds really vintage, like the Smiths... the idea of having a "new surname," and ours is Wytches". As the Peterborough hardcore scene decline in the early 2010s, Bell and Honey moved to Brighton for university. Breed did not join them, leaving the band. In Brighton, they advertised around campus for a bassist for a grunge band. Daniel Rumsey was the only person to respond and joined the band. Rumsey was a singer-songwriter originally from Dorset who had fronted the horror punk band Fall Victim before moving to Brighton where he fronted Dan Rumsey & the Bitter End and the Voyage Andromeda.

In 2012, the band changed their name's spelling to Wytches. In a 2013 interview, they explained the change as being in order to make them more easily found on Google, while in a 2014 interview, they said it was because the name was already being used by, Nine Black Alps bassist, Karl Astbury's sideproject. Their first live performance was at the Buffalo Bar in 2013. The band released their debut single "Beehive Queen" in June 2013 via Hate Hate Hate Records and follow up single "Robe for Juda" in November 2013. In September 2013 the band released a low key limited edition cassette Thunder Lizard Revisited. The band released their debut US single "Crying Clown" (originally the b-side to the band's debut UK single) via Fat Possum Records in November 2013.

=== Annabel Dream Reader and All Your Happy Life (2014–2019) ===
On 4 February 2014, the band announced they had signed with Heavenly Recordings and released "Gravedweller" as a free digital single. The band also signed to Partisan Records in the US. The band released their debut album Annabel Dream Reader in August 2014. The album was recorded over two days at Toe Rag Studios in Hackney, London and co-produced by Bell and former Coral guitarist Bill Ryder-Jones. The album was recorded and mixed by Luke Oldfield on an 8-track Studer A80. It reached number 50 in the UK Albums Chart.

In August 2016, Mark Breed re-joined the band as a permanent member. The band released an EP of self recorded songs titled Home Recordings in June 2016. In September 2016 they released their second album All Your Happy Life. In 2018, the band parted ways with their UK record label Heavenly Recordings and US record label Partisan, leaving them unsigned. In March 2019, the band pulled out of a planned UK support tour with Drenge plus several warm up dates, citing "unforeseen circumstances". In October 2019, the band played 3 gigs as a 3-piece with Honey replaced by session player Demelza Mather.

=== Three Mile Ditch and Our Guest Can't Be Named (2020–2024) ===
In May 2020, Daniel Rumsey released an EP called The Darkest Day from a new side project called Dan Rumsey & the Dark Days. On 10 June 2020, the band released the single "Cowboy" via their own label Cable Code Records. It was also confirmed at this time that Gianni Honey had officially left the band, with Bell stating "we were disheartened by the whole thing. All the work that goes into getting a band off its feet and into the public felt like something we'd have to try all over again". On 2 October 2020 the band released their third album Three Mile Ditch via Cable Code Records. In November 2021, Kristian Bell released a solo album Backfire through Cable Code Records. Demelza Mather had toured with the band as a session drummer since Honey's departure in 2019 and was announced as an official member of the group in March 2023.

In June 2023, the band announced they had signed to Alcopop! Records and would be performing a tour of the UK and Europe in October 2023. On 4 July 2023 the band released the single "Maria" and also announced their upcoming fourth album Our Guest Can't Be Named would be released in September 2023. The music video for Maria was directed by band member Mark Breed. On 24 August 2023 the band released Zep Step, the second single from Our Guest Can't Be Named. A limited edition 7" pressing of the single was released printed on X-ray films in the style of Ribs, a historically black market method of smuggling and distributing music banned from the public. On 22 September 2023 The Wytches released their fourth album Our Guest Can't Be Named. The album received largely positive reviews, with DIY Magazine describing it as "A wave-ride of glorious surf-sludge".

On 5 July 2024, the band released the Replica EP via Alcopop! Records. As well as Pentagram, it also features covers of tracks by Porter Wagoner, Chet Baker and John Cale. Through mid-2024, the band began performing with new drummer Bhav Thaker, who also plays with the band Mademaker.

=== Talking Machine (2024–present) ===
On 12 August 2025, The Wytches released a new single called 'Black Ice'. Alongside the single, the band announced that an upcoming album titled Talking Machine was scheduled for release on 10 October via Alcopop! Records. According to Bell, the album’s concept draws a parallel between Thomas Edison’s “Tone Tests”—events designed to fool audiences into thinking they were listening to live musicians—and the contemporary anxiety surrounding AI and its potential to replace human jobs. Reviews for the album were largely positive, with DIY Magazine describing it as "a commendable addition to The Wytches’ canon", whilst Kerrang said "fired up with attitude and a dash of gothic coldness, Talking Machine is a dark and dreamy mystery". In October/November 2025, the band embarked on a 25 date tour of the UK and EU to support the new album.

On 30 October 2026, they will release All Your Happy Life (10 Year Anniversary EP), an EP in commemeration of ten years since All Your Happy Life, featuring five previously unreleased tracks.

== Musical style and legacy ==
Critics have categorised the Wytches' music as surf rock, psychedelic rock, grunge, stoner metal and post-punk. Exclaim! writer Lisa Sookraj said they merge elements of gothic rock, the post-punk revival and surf rock that results in a sound similar to grunge-influence garage rock. They self-identify as "surf-doom" due to their use of doom metal-inspired riffs and surf rock's slapback delay.

They cited influences including the Doors, Rush, Deep Purple, Nirvana, the Horrors, Bright Eyes, Black Sabbath, Daniel Johnston, Elliott Smith, Nick Cave, Slipknot, Pulled Apart by Horses, Metz, the Growlers, the Offspring, Misfits, Alkaline Trio, AFI, the Cure, Interpol, Whitney Houston, Joanna Newsom, the Birthday Party, Leonard Cohen, Million Dead and doom metal. Bell also the Arctic Monkeys' album Humbug (2009), stating "just that album, nothing else. I found it really moving. I loved the guitar sounds".

During the 2010s, the Wytches were a prominent part of the latter years of the grunge revival. They have been cited as an influence by the Blinders, Pulled Apart by Horses and Muskets.

== Band members ==
Current members

- Kristian Bell – lead vocals, guitar (2011–present)
- Daniel Rumsey – bass guitar, backing vocals (2011–present)
- Mark Breed – keyboards, guitar (2011–2012, 2016–present), bass (2011)
- Bhavin Thaker – drums (2024–present)

Former members

- Gianni Honey – drums (2011–2019)
- Demelza Mather – drums (2023–2024)

== Discography ==
=== Studio albums ===
List of studio albums, with selected chart positions
Title	Album details	Peak chart positions
Title	Album details	UK
Annabel Dream Reader	Released: 25 August 2014; Label: Heavenly; Formats: CD, LP, download	50
All Your Happy Life	Released: 30 September 2016; Label: Heavenly; Formats: CD, LP, download	78
Three Mile Ditch	Released: 2 October 2020; Label: Cable Code; Formats: CD, LP, cassette, download	—
Our Guest Can't Be Named	Released: 22 September 2023; Label: Alcopop!; Formats: CD, LP, download	97
Talking Machine	Released: 10 October 2025; Label: Alcopop!; Formats: CD, LP, download	

=== EPs ===
- The Witches (2012, self released)
- Thunder Lizard Revisited (2013, Hate Hate Hate)
- Gravedweller (2014, Heavenly)
- Thunder Lizard's Reprieve (2015, Scion Audio/Visual)
- Home Recordings (2016, self released)
- Double World (2017, self released)
- Replica (2024, Alcopop!)
- All Your Happy Life (10 Year Anniversary EP) (2026)

=== Singles ===
Title	Year	Album
"Robe for Juda"	2013	Annabel Dream Reader
"Crying Clown"	2013	Annabel Dream Reader
"Digsaw" / "House of Mirrors"	2013	Annabel Dream Reader
"Gravedweller"	2014	Annabel Dream Reader
"Wire Frame Mattress"	2014	Annabel Dream Reader
"Burn Out the Bruise"	2014	Annabel Dream Reader
"C-Side"	2016	All Your Happy Life
"Crest of Death"	2016	All Your Happy Life
"Double World"	2017	non-album single
"Cowboy"	2020	Three Mile Ditch
"A Love You'll Never Know"	2020	Three Mile Ditch
"Maria"	2023	Our Guest Can't Be Named
"Zep Step"	2023	Our Guest Can't Be Named
"Black Ice"	2025	Talking Machine
"Is The World Too Old?"	2025	Talking Machine
