= We Are a Unit =

Studio album by Castrovalva
- Released: April 12, 2010
- Recorded: July 2009–January 2010 at Ghost Town Recordings (Leeds, United Kingdom),
- Genre: Noise rock
- Length: 26.07 Minutes
- Label: Brew Records
- Producer: Ross Halden, Castrovalva

We Are a Unit is the debut studio album by British noise punk band Castrovalva. It was released on April 12, 2010

== Reviews ==
Professional ratings
Review scores
Source	Rating
NME	4/5 stars
Drowned In Sound	(8/10)
Artrocker	5/5 stars
Rocksound	(7/10)
Subba-Cultcha	(9/10)
UK Music Review	5/5 stars

Drowned In Sound Words by Paul Stephen Gettings:

"We Are a Unit is Castrovalva's first LP as a three piece, promoting sometime band artist Leemun Smith up to the mic and perhaps as importantly, from collaborator to visionary. As a two-piece, bassist Anthony Wright and Drummer Daniel Brader played many of the songs here as instrumentals, and it worked; they made a name for themselves as one of the premiere bands of the Leeds houseparty scene, their angular, breakneck grooves packing out sweaty basements wherever they roamed. But with the addition of Smith, they've stumbled upon pure alchemy.

At only 27 minutes long, and with so many changes of pace and style, We Are a Unit is a breathtaking listen. But it's this brevity and diversity that allows Castrovalva to shine where other fearsome live acts have failed - to make a record that does their performances justice. Maybe you can't see the sweat on their brows or feel the cheap lager being thrown overhead, but whenever this album comes clattering into your ears, your gonna have to be fighting pretty damn hard not to be doing some table-somersaulting of your own."
