= False Advertising (band) =

UK-based band

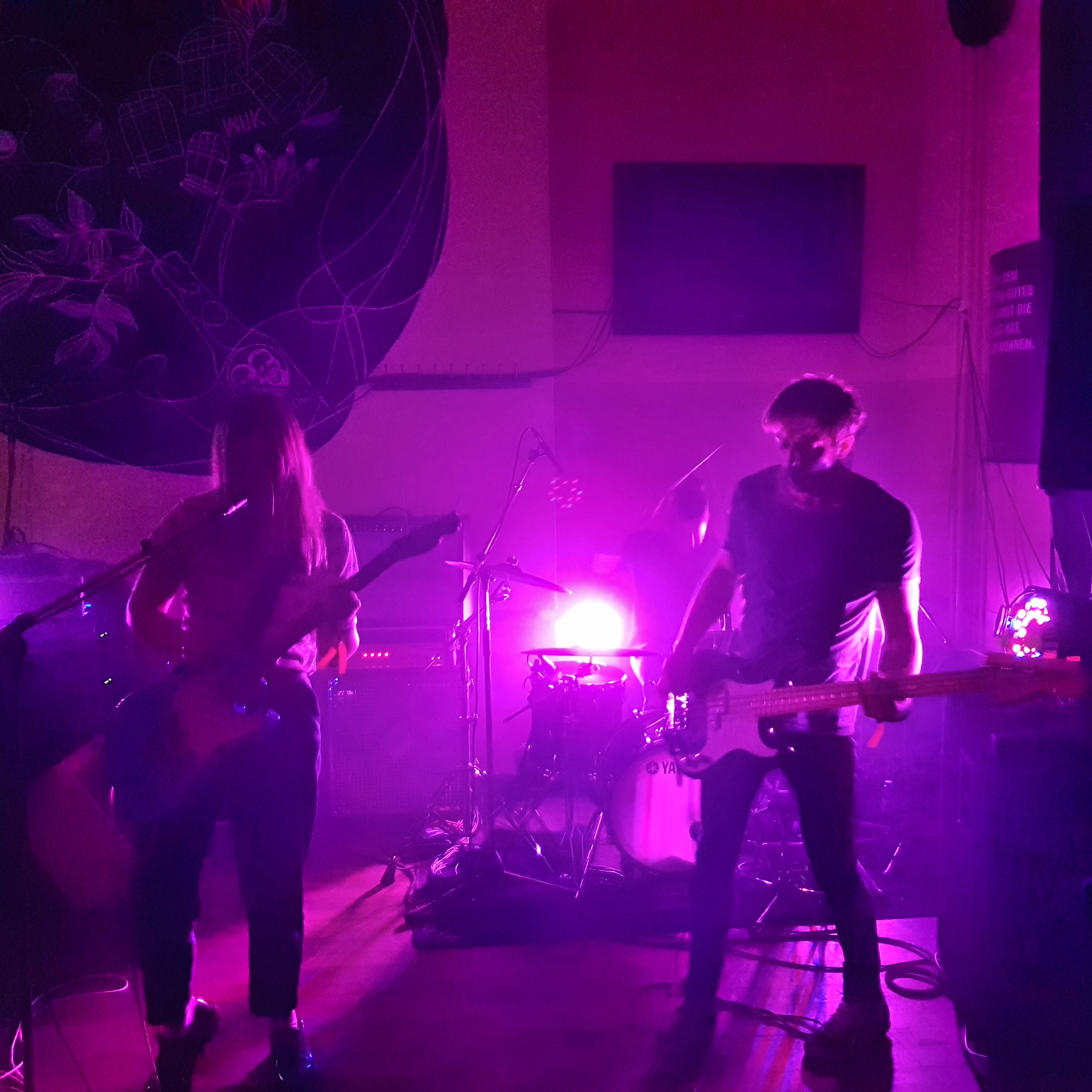
- False Advertising at Waves Vienna, 2018

Background information
- Origin: Manchester and Oxford, England
- Genres: Alternative rock, grunge, noise pop
- Years active: 2013–present
- Labels: Alcopop! Records, Too Pure
- Members: Jen Hingley; Josh Sellers
- Past members: Chris Warr
- Website: www.falseadvertising.co

False Advertising are a British three-piece alternative rock group from Manchester and Oxford, England.

== Biography ==
False Advertising was formed by Jen Hingley and Chris Warr in 2013, with Josh Sellers completing the lineup in 2014. Upon deciding that between them they could produce and release their own music, they set about writing and self recording their debut album. The band released their first single ‘Dozer’ and self-titled album False Advertising in 2015, in June 2016 they released a 7" single on Too Pure Singles Club. The band are noted for their live instrument swapping.

The band received coverage by Total Guitar, The Skinny, DIY (magazine), NME, The Independent, Drowned In Sound and MusicRadar, where Jen was cited #8 in Music Radar's ‘Best New Guitarists in the world right now’ poll.

They have played festivals including Two Thousand Trees Festival, Truck Festival, SXSW, Liverpool Sound City, Meltdown (festival) (curated by Robert Smith), Kendal Calling, Zandari Festa Waves Vienna. In 2018 they put on their own festival in Manchester called ‘Falsetival’.

In October 2018, the band were chosen as recipients of PRS for Music's Momentum Fund.

Jen Hingley's uncle is Tom Hingley, who was previously the singer of The Inspiral Carpets.

In December 2024, the band announced that founding member Chris Warr had left the group.

== Band members ==
- Jen Hingley - lead vocals, guitar, drums (2013–present)
- Josh Sellers - bass (2014–present)

== Former members ==
- Chris Warr - lead vocals, drums, guitar (2013–2024)

== Discography ==
Albums

- False Advertising (2015, self-released)
- Belligerent (2018, 2670 Records - Japanese exclusive)
- Brainfreeze (2019, Alcopop! Records)

EPs

- Brainless (2016, self-released)
- I Would Be So Much Happier If I Just Stopped Caring (2017, self-released)

Singles

- "Dozer" (2015, self-released)
- "Alopecia" (2016, self-released)
- "Give It Your Worst" / "Scars" - (2016, Too Pure)
- "Not My Fault" (2017, self-released)
- "Honest" (2017, self-released)
- "Hey You" (2017, self-released)
- "You Said" (2018, self-released)
- "You Won't Feel Love" (2019, Alcopop! Records)
- "Influenza" (2019, Alcopop! Records)
- "Wasted Days" (2019, Alcopop! Records)
- "Personal Space" (2021, Alcopop! Records)
- "Don't Ask Me" (2024, Alcopop! Records)
