= Peaness =

British band

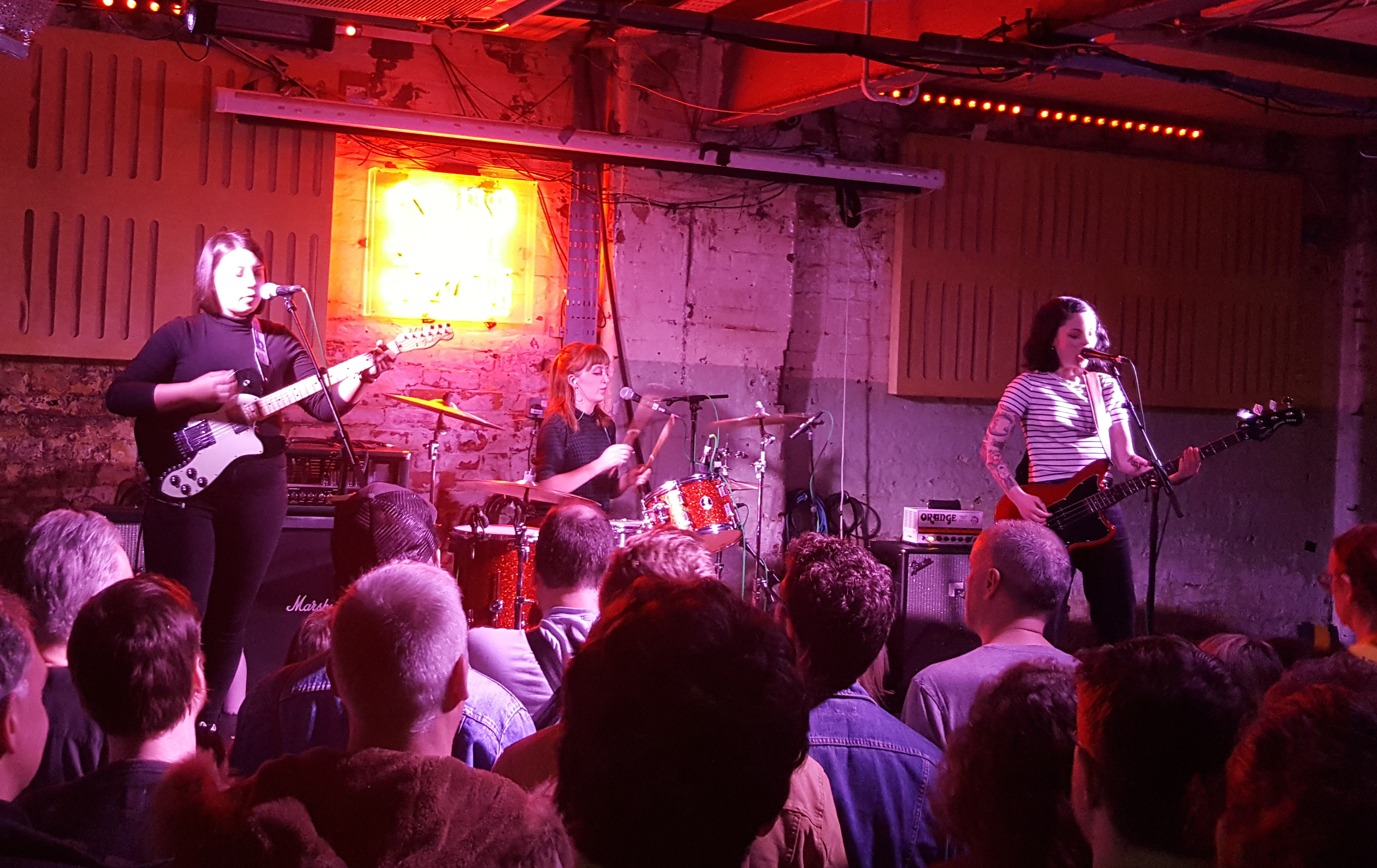

Background information
- Origin: Chester, England
- Genres: Indie pop, pop-punk
- Years active: 2013–present
- Labels: Totally Snick, Alcopop! Records, Odd Box Records, Kingfisher Bluez
- Members: Carleia "Balla" Balbenta; Jess Branney; Rach Williams
- Website: www.peanessband.com

Peaness are a band from Chester, England formed in 2013. Their all-female line-up is Balla (guitar and vocals), Jess (bass and vocals) and Rach (drums). Their sound has been described as "melodic indie pop", "DIY punk" and "shiny shiny pop with an infectious energy and tunes as sharp as their fringes".

== Formation and early releases ==
The band met at University of Chester and formed in 2013. Their name was chosen as a joke. Jess said: "It was a joke name when we started off, and it just stuck because we couldn’t think of anything better or worse. For us, it’s just funny, but for others it’s not, which makes it even funnier.”

Their first release, in 2015, was a four-track EP entitled No Fun. In a positive review, Bearded Magazine said, "An excellent short story done and dusted in an ultra-compact 13 minutes, the set more than sates the appetite before the arrival of full length novel." This was followed in 2016 by the 7-inch single "I'm Not Your Problem"/"Fortune Favours the Bold" on the Canadian label Kingfisher Bluez.

== "Are You Sure?" ==
In 2017, Peaness released the 10-track EP Are You Sure? on Alcopop! Records, with two of the tracks, "Same Place" and "Seafoam Islands", also featuring on a 7-inch single on Odd Box Records. Are You Sure? Received mostly positive reviews. Invicta Magazine called it "the perfect collection of tracks to soundtrack a summer", while VultureHound said it was "a delightful introduction to one of the UK’s most exciting new bands."

== Marc Riley sessions, "Breakfast" and "Kaizen" ==
In May 2019, Peaness recorded a session for Marc Riley's show on BBC Radio 6 Music. The following month, they released a new song, "Breakfast", on their Bandcamp page. The lyrics are described as "a light-hearted take on Brexit". The video for the song premiered on the UK music website The 405.

In January 2020, the band recorded a second Marc Riley session and announced the release of a new song, "Kaizen", which was available digitally and as a limited edition 7" vinyl single, with "Breakfast" on the b-side.

== "World Full Of Worry" ==
In May 2022 Peaness released their long-awaited debut album, "World Full Of Worry" (WFOW) on their own label, Totally Snick Records.

It was well reviewed gaining 4/5 from Kerrang, saying: "This is an album that meets us where we are, offers a hand. It’ll also be a treat at a live show. This is the sound of the summer." and making it onto Time magazine's mid-year list of the Best Albums of 2022 So Far saying: "hooky, terse guitar pop, balancing existential malaise with an ebullient chorus [and] sugar-sweet vocal harmonies..."

The album reached number 16 in the UK independent album charts and number 21 in the UK vinyl album charts.

== Other Initiatives ==
During the 2020 UK covid-19 lockdown, Peaness started a podcast: "Happeaness". It features the band catching up, talking about life and (occasionally) special guests including members of The Orielles and We Are Scientists.

== Jessica BonBon ==
Jess released a 5-track EP, The Lights Are Out Another Week in December 2024 under the name Jessica Bonbon. The collaboration (with Joel Anthony Patchett) began in 2020 but was only completed in 2024. It includes contributions from members of The Orielles and BC Camplight. It has received radio play from several BBC stations.

== Discography ==
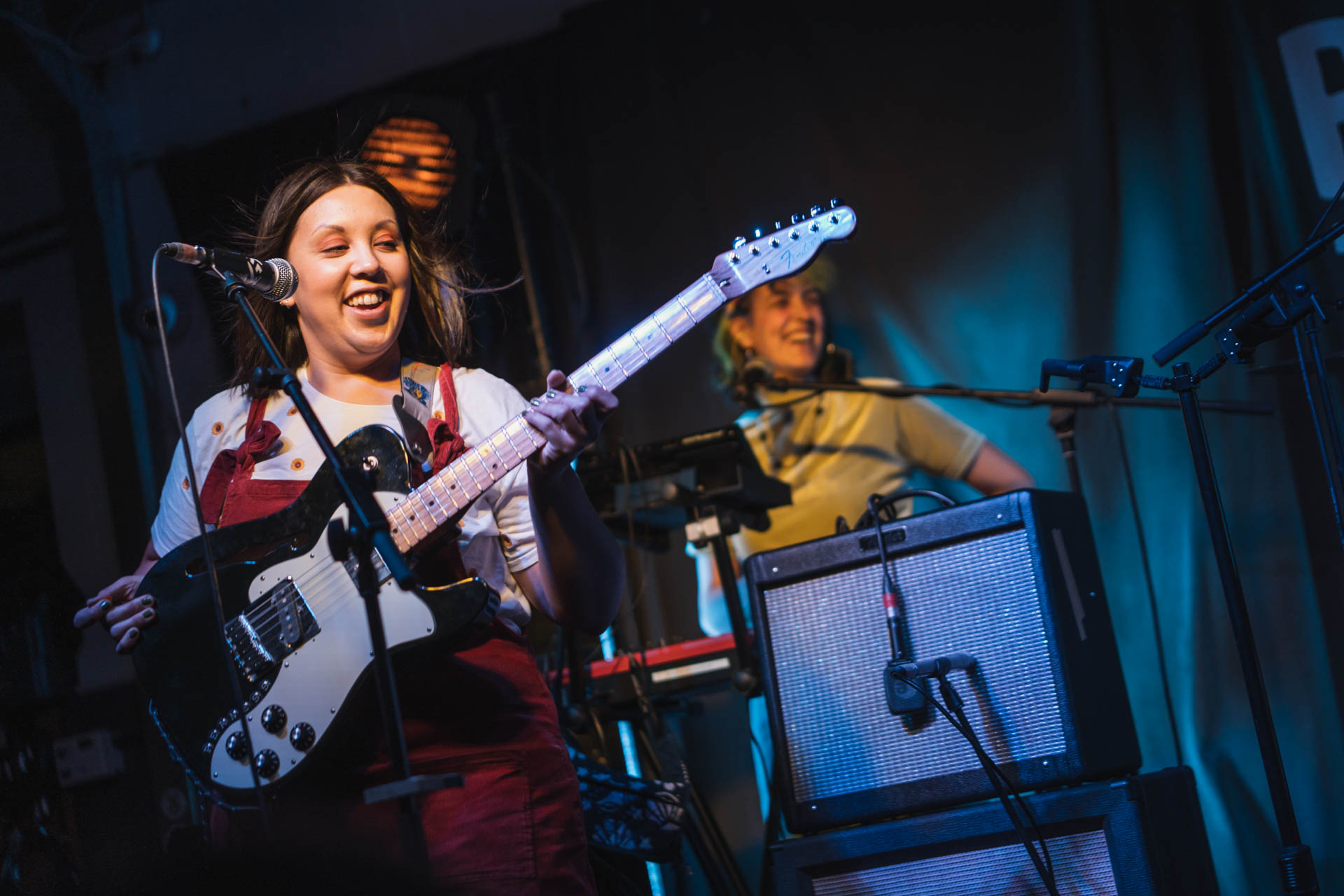
Peaness at Rough Trade Bristol in May 2022

=== Singles and EPs ===
- No Fun - cassette EP (Winter Mute, 2015)
- I'm Not Your Problem / Fortune Favours the Bold - 7" single (Kingfisher Bluez, 2016)
- Same Place / Seafoam Islands - 7" single (Odd Box Records, 2017)
- Breakfast - digital single (2019)
- Kaizen - digital single (2020)
- Kaizen / Breakfast - limited edition 7" single (self released, 2020)
- Kiss Me Sweet Pea - digital and 7" single (2023)

=== Albums ===
- Are You Sure? (Alcopop! Records, 2017)
- World Full Of Worry (2022), Self released CD; limited edition 12" blue vinyl, 12" standard black vinyl
- Are You Sure? (2023, Record Store Day re-issue)

=== Compilation appearances ===
- Piccadilly Records Sampler (Piccadilly Records, 2022) - "IRL"
- Music Against Misogyny (Two-Piers Records, 2023) - "How I’m Feeling"
