= Colour by Numbers (art installation) =

Coordinates: 59°17′53″N 17°59′33″E

Colour by Numbers, video of interactiv light, in 2011

Colour by Numbers is an interactive light installation inside a tower in Telefonplan in the Midsommarkransen area in Stockholm, Sweden. The artwork is made by Erik Krikortz, Loove Broms and Milo Lavén.

== Tower ==
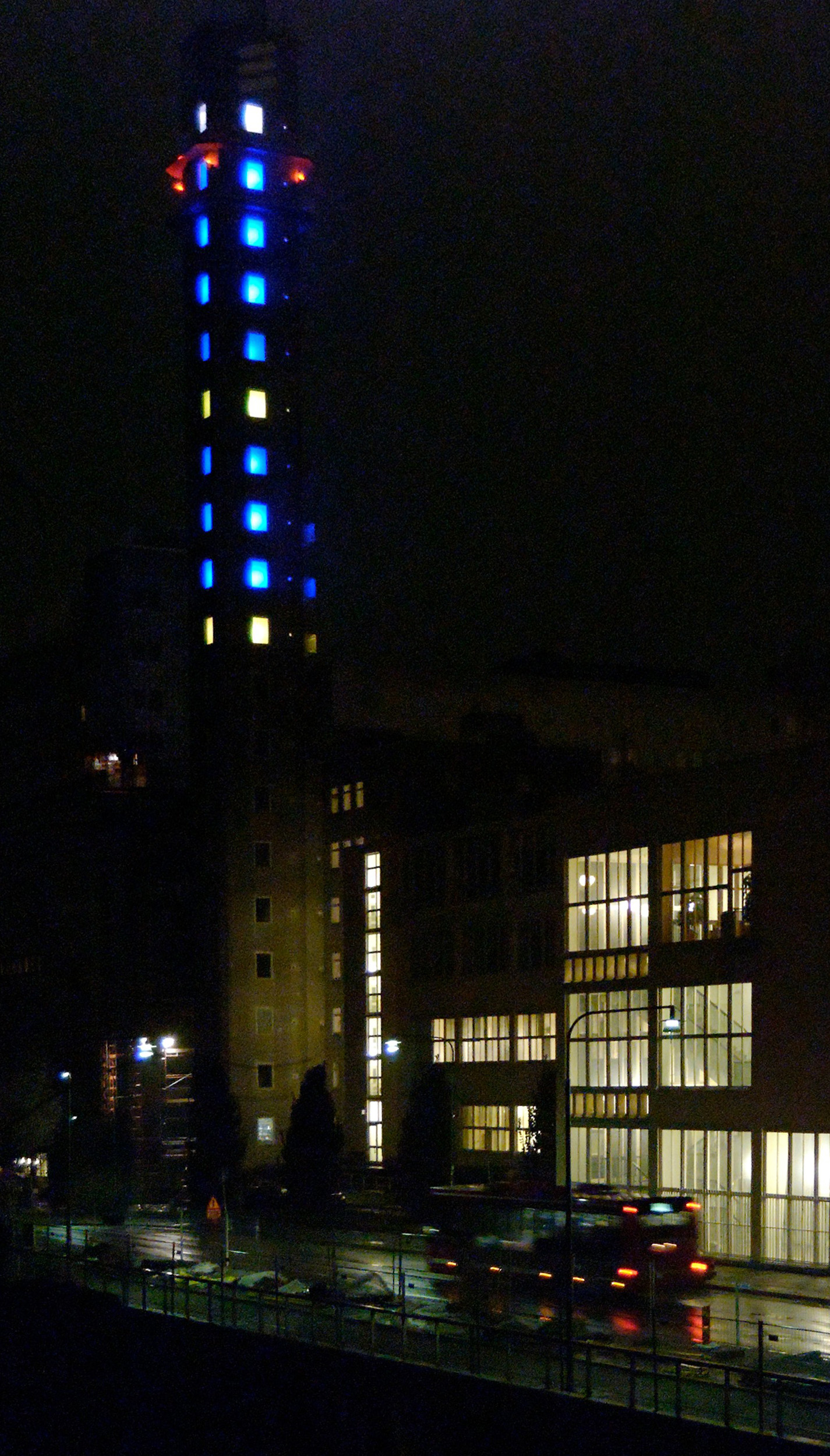
Colour by Numbers (November 2006)

Colour by Numbers was installed between 2006 and 2007 at the LM Ericsson building in Telefonplan, Stockholm. Anyone can control the light by downloading an app, then control the lights inside the tower.
