= Castrovalva (band) =

English noise rock band

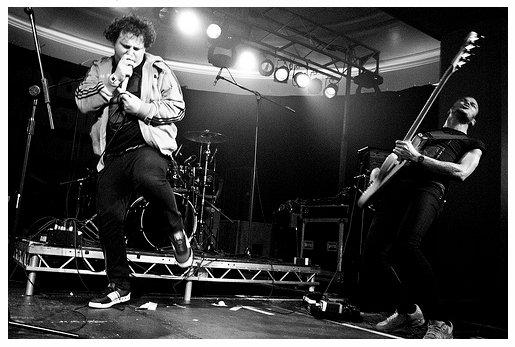
- Live at Leeds 2010

Background information
- Origin: Leeds, West Yorkshire, England
- Genres: Dance-punk, grindie, Nintendocore
- Years active: 2007–2012
- Label: Brew
- Members: Daniel Brader; Anthony Wright; Leemun Smith
- Website: pumppump.co.uk

Castrovalva are an English noise rock band, formed in 2007 in Leeds, West Yorkshire, England. Originally a duo of Daniel Brader (drums) and Anthony Wright (bass guitar), they expanded to a trio with the addition of Leemun Smith (vocals) in 2009. Smith had previously guested on the band's self-titled debut album and provided the cover art.

== History ==
In 2009 the band released their eponymous debut album and toured with bands such as Pulled Apart by Horses and Monotonix. Their second album, We Are a Unit was released in April 2010 on the independent label Brew Records, to positive reviews. The NME described it as "a fine display of this Leeds trio's skills", while Drowned in Sound called it "a breathtaking listen", Subba-Cultcha described the album as "a mind blowing sonic buffet". while Tasty described it as "raw punk music played with a metallic intensity by a group of individuals who are no doubt as drastically unhinged as their bizarre name suggests". Artrocker made it album of the month, giving it a 5/5 rating.

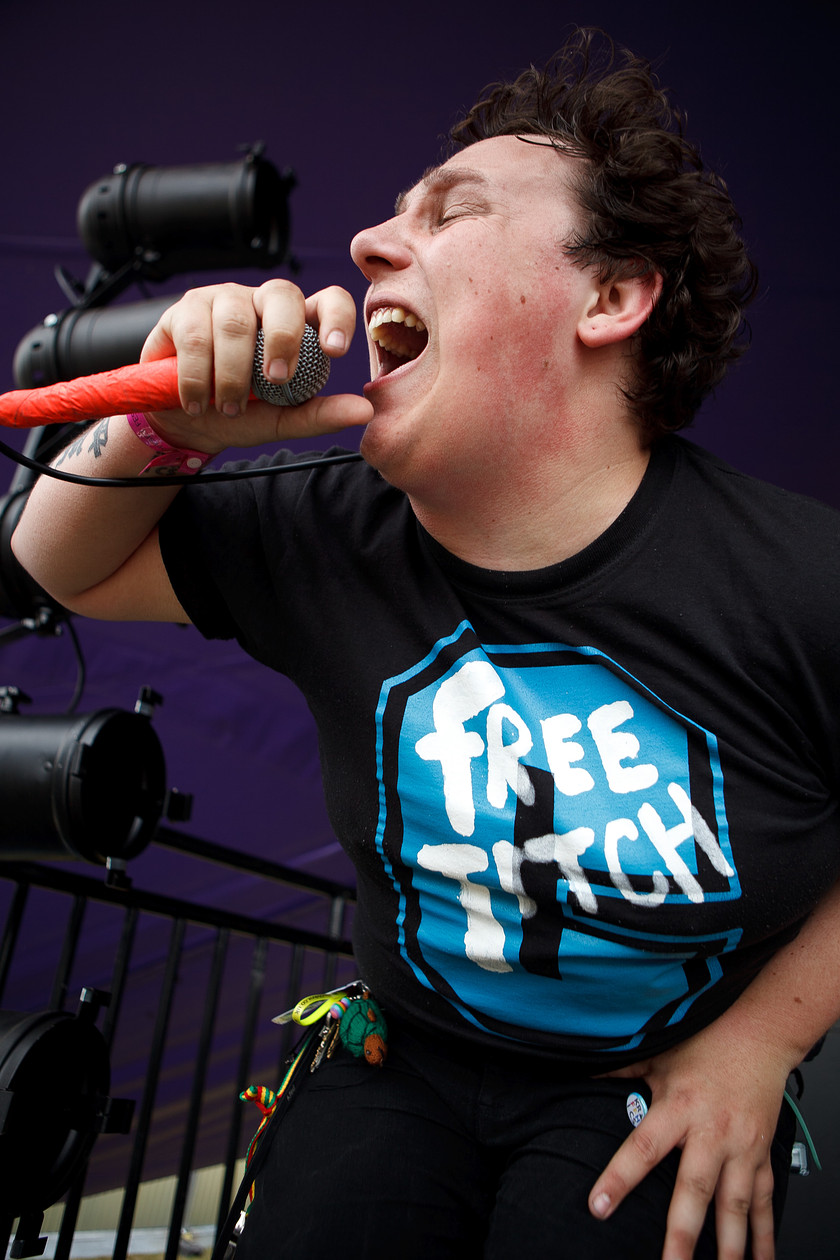
Leemun Smith Offset Festival in support of We Are A Unit

== Discography ==
=== Albums ===
- Castrovalva (2009), Brew
- We Are a Unit (2010), Brew
- You're Not In Hell, You're In Purgatory My Friend (2012), Brew

=== Singles ===
- "Thug Poetry" (2009), Brew
- "Senorita (on Brew/DTTR split)" (2011), Brew/DTTR
- "In Our Prime (on Brew split)" (2011), Brew
- "I Am The Golden Widow / Senorita" (2012), Brew
