= Liverpool Sound City =

Annual music festival in Liverpool, England

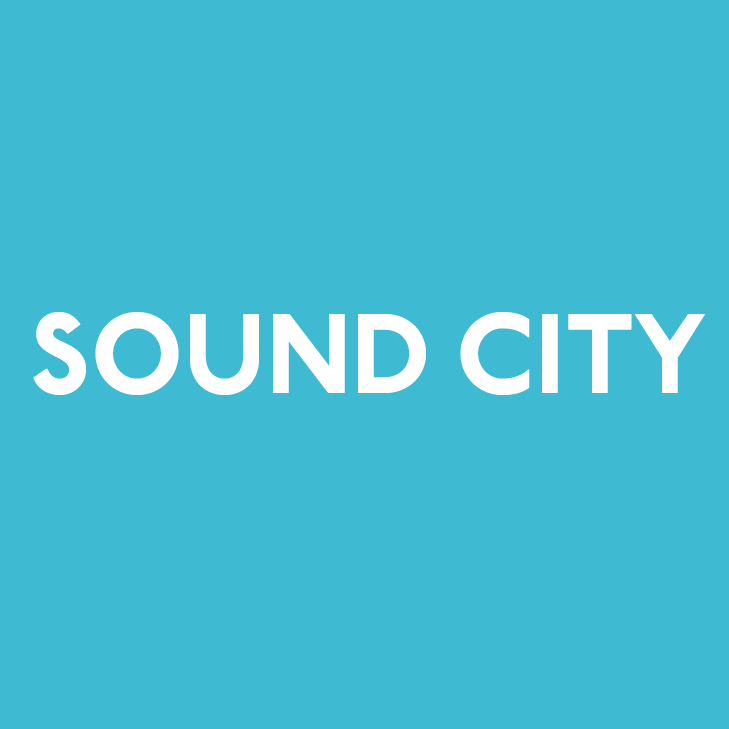

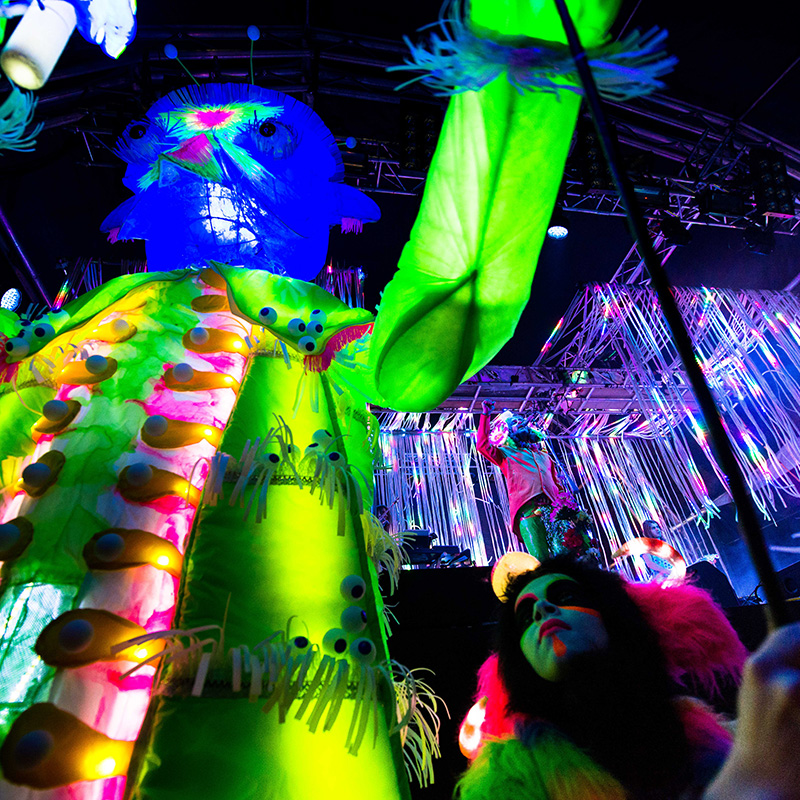
- The Flaming Lips frontman Wayne Coyne performing at Sound City 2015
- Genre: Indie, Alternative, Electronic, Rock
- Locations: Liverpool, England
- Years active: 2008–present
- Website: liverpoolsoundcity.co.uk

Liverpool Sound City is an annual music festival and industry conference held in Liverpool, England. It was founded in 2008 by Dave Pichilingi. Sound City was located in Liverpool City Centre venues, such as The Kazimier, The Zanzibar and the Liverpool Cathedral, until 2015 when it was relocated to Bramley-Moore Dock in Liverpool's historic docklands.

In 2015, the festival took place on Friday 22 May through Sunday 24 May, with headliners The Vaccines, The Flaming Lips and Belle and Sebastian and several artists including, Everything Everything, Peace and The Cribs. Previous artists included Florence and the Machine, The Maccabees, The xx, The Kooks and Ed Sheeran.

The Sound City conference is a one-day music industry conference with keynotes, in conversations and workshop sessions from key digital industry figures. In 2015, the conference took place on Thursday 21 May - Friday 22 May in the Titanic Hotel at Stanley Dock. Speakers included Wayne Coyne of The Flaming Lips, Ramones manager Danny Fields and Mark E. Smith of The Fall.

In 2025 the Sound City conference announced a partnership with UK record industry trade body BPI to incorporate BPI's In Tune With Tomorrow Summit as part of the conference.

== Previous line-ups ==
=== 2008 ===
- Reverend and The Makers
- Mystery Jets
- Laura Marling
- The Wombats
- Santigold
- Lightspeed Champion

=== 2009 ===
- White Lies
- Black Lips
- The xx
- The Rascals
- White Denim

=== 2010 ===
- Paloma Faith
- The Maccabees (band)
- Speech Debelle
- Gil Scott-Heron
- British Sea Power
- The Fall
- Delphic
- Chilly Gonzales

=== 2011 ===
- The View
- Frank Turner
- The Kooks
- The Black Lips
- Funeral Party
- Jamie xx
- Ed Sheeran
- Miles Kane
- Clinic

=== 2012 ===
- The Temper Trap
- Alt-J
- Mystery Jets
- Professor Green
- James Vincent McMorrow
- Ghostpoet
- Django Django
- Niki and The Dove

=== 2013 ===
- Noah and The Whale
- Dexys Midnight Runners
- Reverend and The Makers
- The Walkmen
- Everything Everything
- Darwin Deez
- Delphic
- Unknown Mortal Orchestra
- Enter Shikari
- AlunaGeorge

=== 2014 ===
- Kodaline
- Albert Hammond Jr
- Jon Hopkins
- Gruff Rhys
- The Hold Steady
- Royal Blood
- Clean Bandit
- Jungle
- Courtney Barnett
- Jagwar Ma
- Years and Years
- The Kooks

=== 2015 ===
- The Vaccines
- The Flaming Lips
- Belle and Sebastian
- Everything Everything
- Gaz Coombes
- The Cribs
- The Thurston Moore Band
- The Ghost of a Saber Tooth Tiger
- Peace
- Fat White Family
- Swans (band)
- Fucked Up
- Unknown Mortal Orchestra
- Roni Size

=== 2016 ===
- Catfish and the Bottlemen
- The Coral
- Sleaford Mods
- Circa Waves
- Band of Skulls
- The Dandy Warhols
- Pete Doherty
- Dilly Dally
- Young Fathers
- The Big Moon
- Kagoule
- False Advertising (band)

== Arts ==
Screenadelica is a large gig poster exhibition that has toured and exhibited across England, Europe and the world. It is essentially a 'pop up' gallery celebrating the art of the screen printed gig poster. The works include UK and international artists from the gig-poster 'scene'. These artists have full band and management support to design for The Pixies, DJ Shadow, Björk, The Cure, PJ Harvey, Brian Wilson, Kellis, Gogal Bordello and many more. The art works can be bought at an average price of £30 a piece. Screenadelica host a wide variety of styles promoting the bands that the artists love, inspired by the music they hear.

== Film ==
As part of the Liverpool Sound City arts expansion program, films, music videos and shots have been encouraged presenting and demonstrating throughout the years. These come from variety of venues including FACT, Camp&Furnace and Tabac.

== John Peel World Cup ==
Every year, the John Peel World Cup runs in conjunction with the Sound City festival. The five-a-side tournament stocks band members and music industry professionals into different teams. The funds that are acquired from the event go to the British Heart Foundation in memory of John Peel, the namesake of the tournament.

== Photography ==
In 2009, photographer Kevin Cummins discussed his portfolio at the festival. This portfolio played a part in the rise of both "Madchester" and "Britpop" and includes artists such as Joy Division, The Stone Roses, Manic Street Preachers, R.E.M., U2, Patti Smith, Marc Bolan, The Smiths, Oasis, Foo Fighters and Buzzcocks. In 2012, music photographer Gered Mankowitz attended the event as well. Mankowitz has photographed some of the most famous musicians of the 20th century such as The Rolling Stones, Kate Bush and Jim Hendrix. Notable photographers who have attended the festival include Bill Harry, Mark McNulty, Kevin Cummins, and Ernie Paniccioli. Liverpool Sound also works with local universities and communities to provide photography students an opportunity to develop their skills, gain experience and expand their portfolios.
