= Farmfestival =

FarmFestival
- Genre: Rock, Pop, Alternative, Indie rock, Dance music, Electronic music, Folk, Hip hop, Brass band, Comedy, Spoken Word, Reggae
- Dates: Traditionally, the last weekend in July
- Locations: Bruton, Somerset, England
- Years active: 2006–2021
- Website: farmfestival.co.uk

Farmfestival was an annual two-day music festival held near Bruton, Somerset, England. The festival has no corporate sponsorship and was started by a group of friends. It had increased in popularity since its inaugural event in 2006 reaching attendances of 5000+ before its final event in 2021

It was included in The Sunday Times "Top 100 Music Festivals" in 2009.

The festival organisers made donations to various charities during its life, notably Practical Action and African Development charity Send A Cow, along with local causes each year from the event's proceeds.

== Festival history ==
Farmfestival (Farmfest) began in 2006. The first Farmfestival was held on the land of one of the team members, near Pilton, Somerset, with 400 attending.

During the event, a local farmer (who was attending the event, serving his own organic food), offered the use of his own land. The original 2006 site posed many difficulties for organisers and visitors alike with its extremely rural location and its lack of suitable access. The event has been held at Gilcombe Farm each year since.

== Music, art and food at the festival ==
The festival does not favour one specific genre of music and tends to promote all types of signed as well as unsigned bands and artists including DJ's. Several acts that have appeared at the festival have gone on to greater fame, notably Friendly Fires and SixNationState. There are usually two stages (a main stage and an acoustic tent), in 2008 another tent was added playing dub music which has become a regular, and popular feature since. In the years to follow, the introduction of several more stages and popular regulars "The Den", and "The Sett" have wider increased the scope of the entertainment on offer. For 2016, popular from the 1990s and 2000sDJ Gilles Peterson will appear at the event.

The festival also adopts a "Hats Compulsory" policy and competitions are run for the best hats. During the weekend, there is organic food (including vegetarian and vegan) from Gilcombe Farm on sale as well as local cider. The Sunday Times referred to Farmfestival as "The Bargain of the Festival Season", referring to the low ticket and refreshment prices. The Daily Mirror named Farmfestival as one of the "5 Best Budget Music Festivals for 2015"

The festival has a capacity of 5,000.
