= Deportation Blues =

Studio album by B.C. Camplight
- Released: August 24, 2018
- Recorded: 2016–2017
- Length: 39:17
- Label: Bella Union

B.C. Camplight chronology
How to Die in the North (2015)	Deportation Blues (2018)

Professional ratings
Aggregate scores
Source	Rating
AnyDecentMusic?	7.6/10
Metacritic	77/100
Review scores
Source	Rating
AllMusic	3.5/5 stars
MusicOMH	4.5/5 stars
The Skinny	4/5 stars

Deportation Blues is the fourth studio album by American singer-songwriter B.C. Camplight. It was released on August 24, 2018 through Bella Union.

== Track listing ==
No.	Title	Length
1.	"Deportation Blues"	4:44
2.	"I'm In a Weird Place Now"	4:32
3.	"Hell or Pennsylvania"	4:29
4.	"I'm Desperate"	4:09
5.	"When I Think of My Dog"	4:12
6.	"Am I Dead Yet?"	5:26
7.	"Midnight Ease"	4:58
8.	"Fire in England"	3:44
9.	"Until You Kiss Me"	3:03
