= Alcopop! Records =

British independent record label

- Founded: 2006
- Founder: Jack Clothier (AKA Jack pOp); Kevin Douch
- Genre: Indie pop
- Country of origin: United Kingdom
- Location: Oxford, England
- Official website: ilovealcopop.co.uk

Alcopop! Records is a British independent record label, run by Jack Clothier and Kevin Douch formed in East Oxford, 2006. The label works with DITZ, Johnny Foreigner, Fight Like Apes, Anamanaguchi, Peaness, Gaffa Tape Sandy, and The Spook School, among others.

== Inception ==
Alcopop! Records was formally created after a small loan was gambled on the Charlton vs Portsmouth match of 16 September 2006, with money for the first release and show generated from a successful bet on the match. This money was invested in a band from Yeovil called Encyclopedia, with the first single "Emily" (Alcopop001) kicking off the 2006/7 singles club (which also included the likes of Midget, data.select.party and 4 or 5 Magicians). Founder Jack pOp, in a 2020 interview with the Complete Music Update website, said "Alcopop! was born back in 2006 with a three figure loan from my Dad and a fuzzy idea to mix up some classic 90s indie and some awesome new stuff and – via a series of handmade, special three-inch CDs – do our bit to prove that physical music wasn’t dead. We got drunk, bet a large chunk of the money on a football match, and Congolese striker Lomana LuaLua ensured that we had enough cash to get going!"

== Alcopop! anti-UKIP controversy ==
In 2015, Alcopop! stepped in after a hacker cancelled the United Kingdom Independence Party (UKIP) website contract and temporarily purchased the UKIP website. Claiming they’d fill the website with multi-coloured unicorns or donate the website to a pro-immigration agency, the website nevertheless was soon forcibly recovered and returned to the political party by provider GoDaddy. UKIP later blamed 'gremlins in the system'. Alcopop! then proceeded to collaborate with Shikari Sound System to release 7" record "The Wit and Wisdom of Nigel Farage" which was, of course, completely silent. The release profits went to Migrants Rights Network and was in homage to a similar stunt by Stiff Records against Ronald Reagan.

== Alcopop! interesting formats ==
As well as operating more standard album and EP releases on CD and vinyl, Alcopop! Records prides itself on releasing through a host of different formats, and has put out singles and EPs on the likes of frisbees (Johnny Foreigner Certain Songs are Cursed EP), scarves (My First Tooth Sleet and Snow EP), bespoke watches (Gunning for Tamar Time Trophies EP) and a Minidisc (Stagecoach – Say Hi to the Band). When asked about motivation for producing these different formats in a recent interview, Jack pOp stated "For me the it’s more than what is on that record… It’s about the experience from the moment you get it, how the artwork makes you feel, being able to show it to friends – the anticipation of dropping the needle/ pressing the play button… I genuinely love it."

In 2014, Alcopop! re-released the hit song "Steal My Sunshine" on cassette with co-founders Jack and Kev drawn into the re-imagined sleeve alongside some of the original cast.

In 2023, Alcopop! released Zep Step, a single from the album Our Guest Can't Be Named by The Wytches. A limited edition 7" pressing of the single was printed on X-ray films in the style of Ribs, a historically black market method of smuggling and distributing music banned from the public.

== Other notable releases ==
Alcopop! were the first label in the UK to release a podcast on vinyl, collaborating with the QI Elves to put out a special edition of their 'No Such Thing As A Fish' podcast on vinyl – which came with 52 episodes of the podcast on the download card. The record included a bonus track from Corey Taylor of Slipknot fame on the B-side.

Working with Brighton grunge band TIGERCUB in 2017, Alcopop! put out the world's first Pay What You Want 12" vinyl. Preceded by a physical mailout campaign to all existing fans of the band, the original pressing sold out within 24 hours and was considered a success by singer Jamie Hall, who stated "We were worried people wouldn’t give a shit, but it quickly turned into fucking Wikileaks. It escalated fast. We fucking sold out of 'em all pretty much before we went public, so we had to put up a second pressing pre-sale for people who missed out, which is now about to sell out too.

In response to Record Store Day pricing, Alcopop! released Sensible Record Labels volumes 1 and 2 on Record Store Day in 2015 and 2016. Priced at £10, each compilation featured 11 songs from independent labels alongside a download card with hundreds of songs, and each release sold out on the day. Tim Dellow, founder of Transgressive Records, said of Volume 1 that the label was pleased to be involved in a project representing independent artists and labels, offering fans an affordable way to discover new bands and support local independent stores.

Alcopop! gained a reputation for their 'Alcopopular' compilation series. The series has even been branded 'The coolest compilation ever' by NME. Alcopopular has been released as a bike, a 3" CD, a cassette tape, a message in a bottle, a restaurant menu and fold out 'Hithikers Guide to the UK'. Loud and Quiet suggested "We need labels like Alcopop to offer us something a little out of the ordinary. There’s no character in a bunch of mega bites but there’s a hell of a lot in a bottle containing a modern day pirate treasure map that leads you to some audio booty."

== Awards and honours ==
Alcopop! Records were named as the best small label at the AIM Awards 2013, after being nominated in 2012.

Alcopop! were also voted as the best record label in the UK at the Punktastic Reader Awards in 2012.

== Artists with releases on Alcopop! ==
- Anamanaguchi
- Art Brut
- Best Ex
- Brawlers
- Cheekface
- cheerbleederz
- The Crimea
- DITZ
- DZ Deathrays
- El Ten Eleven
- Emperor Yes
- False Advertising
- Fight Like Apes
- Freeze The Atlantic
- Gaffa Tape Sandy
- Get Cape. Wear Cape. Fly
- Happy Accidents
- Helen Love
- Hellogoodbye
- itoldyouiwouldeatyou
- Johnny Foreigner
- Katie Malco
- Kississippi
- Matt Pryor
- No Such Thing as a Fish
- Peaness
- Problem Patterns
- The QI Elves
- The Social Club
- The Spook School
- Stagecoach
- Tellison
- Tigercub
- The Wytches
