= Armor for Sleep discography =

Band discography

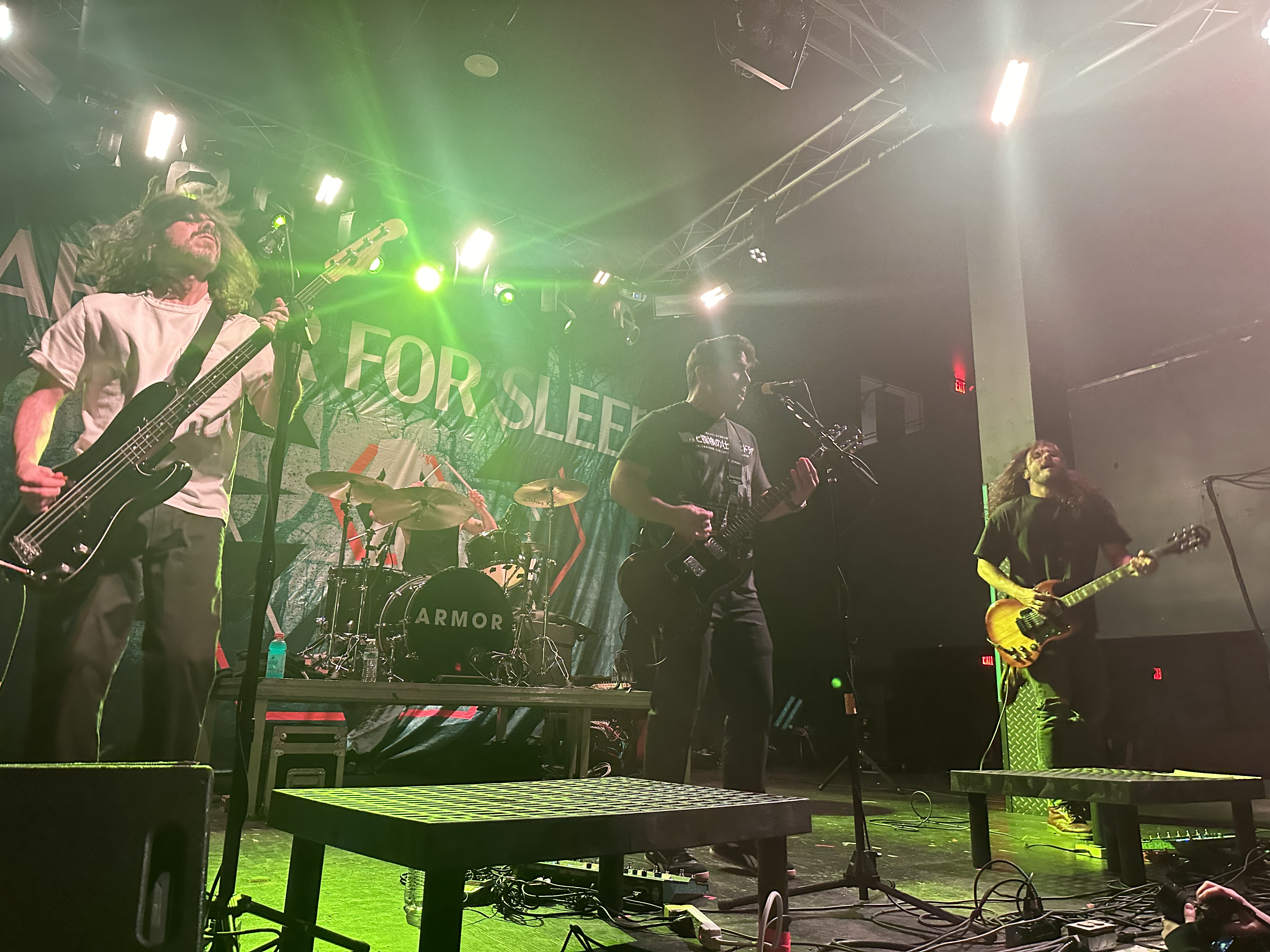
- Armor for Sleep performing in 2026
- Studio albums: 5
- EPs: 1
- Singles: 8

The discography of Armor for Sleep, an American rock band, consists of four studio albums, two extended play and eight singles.

== Studio albums ==
List of studio albums, with selected chart positions
Year	Album details	Peak chart positions		
Year	Album details	US	US Indie	US Heat.
2003	Dream to Make Believe: Released: June 3, 2003; Label: Equal Vision	—	—	—
2005	What to Do When You Are Dead: Released: February 22, 2005; Label: Equal Vision	101	8	1
2007	Smile for Them: Released: October 30, 2007; Label: Sire	93	—	—
2022	The Rain Museum: Released: September 9, 2022; Label: Equal Vision, Rude	—	—	—
2025	There Is No Memory: Released: November 7, 2025; Label: Equal Vision	—	—	—
a "—" denotes an album did not chart

== Extended plays ==
List of extended plays
Year	EP details
2001	Five Song Demo: Released: 2001; Label: self-released
2008	The Way Out Is Broken: Released: September 5, 2008; Label: Sire

== Singles ==
List of singles, showing associated albums
Year	Title	Album
2003	"Dream to Make Believe"	Dream to Make Believe
2004	"My Town"	Dream to Make Believe
2005	"Car Underwater"	What to Do When You Are Dead
2005	"The Truth About Heaven"	What to Do When You Are Dead
2006	"Remember to Feel Real"	What to Do When You Are Dead
2007	"Williamsburg"	Smile for Them
2008	"Hold the Door"	Smile for Them
2022	"How Far Apart"	The Rain Museum
2022	"Whatever, Who Cares"	The Rain Museum
2022	"New Rainbows"	The Rain Museum
2024	"In Another Dream"	There Is No Memory
2024	"What A Beautiful World"	There Is No Memory
2025	"Breathe Again"	There Is No Memory
2025	"The Outer Ring"	There Is No Memory
2025	"Last Days"	There Is No Memory

== Other appearances ==
List of other song appearances
Year	Title	Album
2005	"Very Invisible"	Masters of Horror Soundtrack
2006	"Today" (Smashing Pumpkins cover)	The Killer in You: A Tribute to Smashing Pumpkins
2007	"End of the World"	Transformers - The Album

== Videography ==
=== Music videos ===
List of music videos, showing directors
Year	Title	Director
2003	"Dream to Make Believe"	Christian Winters
2004	"My Town"	Andrew Paul Bowser
2005	"Car Underwater"	Shane Drake
2005	"The Truth About Heaven"	Alan Ferguson
2006	"Remember to Feel Real"	Lex Halaby
2007	"Williamsburg"	Tue Wallin Storm
2008	"Hold the Door"	Tue Wallin Storm
2022	"How Far Apart"	Jesse Korman
2022	"Whatever, Who Cares"	Jesse Korman
2022	"New Rainbows"	Jesse Korman
2025	"Breathe Again"	Dylan Hryciuk & Michael Herrick
2025	"The Outer Ring"	Dylan Hryciuk & Michael Herrick
2025	"Last Days"	Jesse Korman

=== Video albums ===
List of video albums, with notes
Year	Title	Details
2004	Homesick: DVD Compilation, Vol. 1	"Dream to Make Believe" is featured on the compilation DVD
2005	What to Do When You Are Dead Bonus DVD	Initial pressings of What to Do When You Are Dead included a bonus DVD documenting how the record was made
2005	A Comprehensive Guide To Touring	An in-depth view of the band while on-tour and off-tour.
