= Machine (producer) =

American record producer

Machine (born Gene Freeman) is an American record producer and mix engineer known for his work in heavy metal, punk, and rock music. He has produced and mixed albums for bands such as Lamb of God, Clutch, and Every Time I Die, and has been described by Kerrang! as a "metal production legend." In addition to his studio work, Machine has contributed to music-production education, including teaching a mix-breakdown of Lamb of God’s Grammy-nominated song "Redneck" on the Nail the Mix platform.

== Career ==
Machine has been described by Kerrang! as a "metal production legend," noted for helping developing heavy bands refine their sound and for his role in shaping modern American metal production. His production philosophy has also been profiled by Toontrack, where he discussed building mixes around the most important instrument in a given song and avoiding formulaic templates.

In addition to his record-production work, Machine has contributed to music-production education. In 2018, he appeared as a guest instructor on the Nail the Mix platform, providing a full breakdown of his mix for Lamb of God’s Grammy-nominated song "Redneck," including access to multitrack stems and a livestreamed mixing session.

== Discography ==
Machine has worked with a number of artists on their albums:

Year	Artist	Title	Role
2027	Clutch	Wasted Lands	Produced
2026	Haste the Day	Dissenter	Mixing
2025	Vukovi	My God Has Got A Gun	Produced, engineering, mixing, mastering
2024	Haste the Day	Coward (10th Anniversary Remix and Remaster)	Mixing, mastering
2024	Unpeople	The Garden	Produced, engineering, mixing, mastering
2024	The Hu	The HU Live At Glastonbury	Mixing, Mastering
2023	Nothing More	SPIRITS (LIVE)	Mixing, additional production
2023	Post Profit	Self Defeater	Produced, engineering, mixing, mastering
2022	Thousand Thoughts	Better than Never	Mixing, Mastering
2022	Just Friends	Hella	Mixing, Mastering
2021	Press to Meco	Transmute	Produced, engineering, mixing, mastering
2021	Kerri Watt	Neptune's Daughter	Produced, engineering, mixing, mastering
2020	The Amity Affliction	Everyone Loves You... Once You leave Them	Mixing, mastering
2020	The Living Tombstone	zero_one	Produced, engineering, mixing
2019	Bellybuster	When the Morning Comes	Mixing, mastering
2019	Grayscale	Nella Vita	Produced, engineering, mixing
2019	Roam	Smile Wide	Produced, engineering, mixing, mastering
2019	Prophets and Outlaws	Dreamer	Produced, engineering, mixing
2018	As It Is	The Great Depression	Produced, engineering, mixing
2018	Press to Meco	Here's to the Fatigue	Produced, engineering, mixing, mastering
2018	Blue Water Highway	Heartbreak City	Produced, engineering, mixing
2016	Kyng	Breathe In The Water	Produced, engineering, mixing
2016	Crobot	Welcome to Fat City	Produced, engineering, mixing
2015	Clutch	Psychic Warfare	Produced, engineering, mixing
2014	Upon a Burning Body feat. Ice T	Turn Down For What	Production, engineering, mixing, mastering
2014	Crobot	Something Supernatural	Produced, engineering, mixing
2013	Crossfaith	Apocalyze	Produced, engineering, mixing
2013	Clutch	Earth Rocker	Produced, engineering, mixing
2012	House vs. Hurricane	Crooked Teeth	Produced, engineering, mixing
2012	Impending Doom	Baptized in Filth	Mixing, vocal engineering, add production
2012	Miss May I	At Heart	Produced, engineering, mixing
2012	Crossfaith	Zion (EP)	Produced, engineering, mixing
2011	Hit the Lights	Invicta (EP)	Production, mixing
2011	We Came as Romans	Understanding What We've Grown to Be	Produced, engineering, mixing (deluxe edition)
2011	Oh, Sleeper	Children of Fire	Mixing
2011	Protest the Hero	Scurrilous	Mixing
2011	Halestorm	ReAniMate: The CoVeRs eP	Mixing
2011	Brighter Brightest	Right for Me	Produced, engineering, mixing
2010	Chiodos	Illuminaudio	Produced, engineering, mixing
2010	The Amity Affliction	Youngbloods	Produced, engineering, mixing
2010	Four Year Strong	Enemy of the World	Produced, engineering, mixing
2010	Halestorm	Live in Philly, 2010	Mixing
2009	Four Year Strong	Explains It All	Produced, engineering, mixing
2009	Suicide Silence	No Time to Bleed	Produced, engineering, mixing, mastering
2009	A Skylit Drive	Adelphia	Mixing
2009	Cobra Starship	Hot Mess	Co-production, additional engineering, mixing
2009	Dananananaykroyd	Hey Everyone!	Produced, engineering, mixing
2009	The Cab	Take My Hand ft. Cassadee Pope (Remix)	Remix, additional production, mix
2008	Johnny Foreigner	Waited Up 'til It Was Light	Produced, engineering, mixing
2008	The Bronx	The Bronx III	Mixing
2008	The Academy Is...	Fast Times at Barrington High	Mixing
2008	The Cab	Whisper War	Mixing
2007	Bloodsimple	Red Harvest	Produced, engineering
2007	Armor for Sleep	End Of The World - Machine Intelligence Remix	Remix, production, engineering, mixing
2007	Armor for Sleep	Smile for Them	Produced, writing, engineering, mixing
2007	Demon Hunter	Storm the Gates of Hell	Mixing
2007	Haste the Day	Pressure the Hinges	Mixing
2007	Cobra Starship	¡Viva la Cobra!	Produced, engineering, mixing
2006	Gym Class Heroes	As Cruel as School Children	"The Queen and I" bonus remix titled "The Machine and I" (feat. Keith Buckley of Every Time I Die)
2006	Gym Class Heroes	The Quilt	Additional production, additional engineering, mixed
2006	Eighteen Visions	Eighteen Visions	Produced, engineering, mixing
2006	Halifax	The Inevitability of a Strange World	Co-production, engineering, mixing
2006	Lamb of God	Sacrament	Produced, engineering, mixing
2005	Armor for Sleep	What to Do When You Are Dead	Produced, engineering, mixing, additional writing
2005	Demon Hunter	The Triptych	Mixing
2005	Fall Out Boy	Tony Hawk's American Wasteland Soundtrack	Production, engineering, and mixed the track "Start Today"
2005	Emanuel	Soundtrack to a Headrush	Produced, engineering, mixing
2005	Mindless Self Indulgence	You'll Rebel to Anything	Produced, engineering, mixing
2005	Boys Night Out	Trainwreck	Produced, engineering, mixing
2005	Every Time I Die	Gutter Phenomenon	Produced, engineering, mixing
2004	28 Days	Extremist Makeover	Produced, engineering, mixing
2004	Lamb of God	Ashes of the Wake	Produced, engineered, mixed
2004	Clutch	Blast Tyrant	Produced, engineering, mixing
2003	Hed PE	Blackout	Produced, engineering, additional writing
2003	Serafin	No Push Collide	Mixed, additional production for singles
2003	King Crimson	The Power to Believe	Co-produced, engineering, mixing
2003	King Crimson	Eyes Wide Open (disc 1)	Mixed
2003	King Crimson	EleKtrik: Live in Japan	Mixed
2002	Sev	All These Dreams	Produced, engineering, mixing, additional writing
2002	Pitchshifter	PSI	Produced, engineering, mixing
2002	28 Days	Stealing Chairs	Produced, engineering, mixing
2001	Diffuser	Injury Loves Melody	Mixing, additional production
2001	Lostprophets	The Fake Sound of Progress	Mixed the singles
2001	Vision of Disorder	From Bliss to Devastation	Produced, engineering, mixing, additional writing
2001	Clutch	Pure Rock Fury	Produced, engineered
2000	Submarine	Skin Diving	Produced, engineering, mixing
2000	Hed PE	Broke	Produced, engineering, additional writing
1999	The Step Kings	Let's Get It On	Produced, engineering, mixing, additional writing
1999	Coal Chamber feat. Ozzy Osbourne	"Shock the Monkey" (Peter Gabriel cover)	Mixed single
1999	Stony Sleep	A Slack Romance	Produced, engineering, mixing
1999	Shootyz Groove	High Definition	Produced, engineering, mixing, additional writing
1998	Pitchshifter	www.pitchshifter.com	Produced, engineering, mixing
1996	White Zombie	Supersexy Swingin' Sounds	Mixed single
