= Nowhere to Hide (Crobot song) =

Single by Crobot

from the album Something Supernatural
- Released: July 29, 2014
- Genre: Hard rock, heavy metal, psychedelic metal
- Length: 3:03
- Label: Wind-up
- Songwriters: Brandon Yeagley, Chris Bishop, Jake Figueroa, Paul Figueroa

Crobot singles chronology
"Nowhere to Hide" (2014)	"Night of the Sacrifice" (2014)

"Nowhere to Hide" is a song by American hard rock band Crobot. The song was released in mid 2014 as the lead off single from the band's second album, Something Supernatural, and peaked at number 16 on the Billboard Mainstream Rock Songs chart.

== Chart performance ==
The song was the first song by the band to chart, reaching number 16 on the Billboard Mainstream Rock Songs chart, as well as number 49 on the Billboard Rock Airplay chart.

== Charts ==
Chart (2014)	Peak position
US Mainstream Rock (Billboard)	16
US Rock Airplay (Billboard)	49

== Release history ==
Region	Date	Format	Label
United States	July 29, 2014	Digital download	Wind-up Records
