= Transmute (album) =

Studio album by Press to Meco
- Released: 20 August 2021
- Recorded: 7 August – 6 September 2020
- Studios: The Round Tower, Cirencester
- Length: 45:03
- Label: Marshall
- Producer: Machine

Press to Meco chronology
Acoustic (2019)	Transmute (2021)

Singles from Transmute
- 1. "Another Day" Released: 19 February 2021; 2. "Smouldering Sticks" Released: 19 March 2021; 3. "Gold" Released: 7 May 2021; 4. "A Test of Our Resolve" Released: 2 July 2021

Transmute is the third and final album by English alternative rock band Press to Meco. Released on 20 August 2021 through Marshall Records, the record is the band's only album with bassist/vocalist Jake Crawford.

== Background and recording ==
Work on a new album initially began in 2019 with the writing and recording of the song, "Easy Life" and a rough demo of eventual lead single, "Another Day". The band originally planned to work on songs gradually over a loose timeframe to build an album up in stages but plans to work this way were eventually scrapped in favour of working on the album as a whole. The band then aimed on stepping into the studio with Richard Craker, who had handled the production of "Easy Life" – which was released as a standalone single on 19 September 2019 – and their Acoustic EP, but this arrangement would ultimately encounter logistical problems, and plans to work together fell apart. After securing a replacement producer, plans were confirmed for recording to begin the following year. Before this would commence however, the trio first headed to Los Angeles in January 2020 to play the Marshall Amps booth at the NAMM show. It was while there that they bumped into Here's to the Fatigue producer Machine, and with both parties eager to work with one another again plans were hastily amended for Machine to take over the role of producer.

Now scheduled for recording to take place in Texas at the Machine Shop, the band had 75% of the album written before original bassist/vocalist Adam Roffey would depart Press to Meco in late February 2020. ACODA multi-instrumentalist, Jake Crawford was later announced as Roffey's replacement but the effects of the COVID-19 pandemic thwarted album recording plans set up in the United States. Having earlier spent time writing at a remote castle in the Cotswolds, arrangements were instead made to convert the 16th century space into a makeshift studio to record the album. Assembled with minimal equipment and with Machine flying out to England, recording began at the beginning of August with a skeleton crew in line with government COVID guidelines at the time while in-between lockdowns. Recording was completed the following month on 6 September 2020, with mixing later taking place at the Machine Shop.

Prior to the making of the album, guitarist/vocalist Luke Caley later admitted that the band had become disillusioned with continuing on, stating, “When we started writing this, we were pretty sure this was going to be the last thing we ever did.” The guitarist would go on to credit a positive writing experience and the arrival of Crawford as factors reinvigorating the band. The resulting album was officially announced on 19 February 2021, with test pressings and a limited edition “smokey gold” vinyl version being made available alongside physical and digital editions of the album. Lead single, “Another Day” accompanied this announcement, with second single, “Smouldering Sticks” following exactly a month later on 19 March. Just over six weeks before the album's original release date of 11 June 2021 however, it was announced that Transmute had been rescheduled to a 20 August release later that year. In explanation, the band alluded to the delay arising from the continued effects of the coronavirus pandemic, stating, "With everything going on right now, things are moving way more slowly than we had hoped."

== Critical reception ==
Similarly to the band's two preceding albums, Transmute was met with almost unanimous positive critical response. Distorted Sound called the album a "smorgasbord of songwriting mastery", concluding that the record "should be seen as a victory lap for a band who've bounced back from the brink with an album of expansive alt-rock bangers to bring the house down." In a 10 out of 10 review, Rock Sins praised the album for its sequencing, its varied sonic elements and its heart, opining that "Transmute as an album is full of character and feels more than just a body of music". Sam Law, writing in a four out of five star review for Kerrang!, commended the progression of the band on Transmute and for mining the experience of near-disbandment to positive effect. "Harnessing the darkness and disillusionment", Law wrote, "these 13 tracks drive into more turbulent, soul-searching territory than before." Punktastic writer Aaron Jackson also levelled much of his praise at the album for showcasing the band's reaction to the collective hardships they had experienced, stating that, as a consequence, Transmute is "their most challenging, yet most fulfilling album to date". Upset Magazine also awarded the album four out of five stars, concluding the record to be "a great album from a band that inspire in more mays [sic] than one".

== Track listing ==
Transmute track listing
No.	Title	Length
1.	"Transmute"	0:36
2.	"Another Day"	3:46
3.	"Smouldering Sticks"	3:45
4.	"A Test of Our Resolve"	3:40
5.	"Baby Steps"	5:32
6.	"Sabotage"	4:20
7.	"Overdue"	4:14
8.	"Lead"	2:21
9.	"Rusty Nails"	3:44
10.	"Gold"	4:01
11.	"Interlude"	1:13
12.	"Way to Know"	3:09
13.	"Hesitation"	4:42
Total length:		45:03

== Personnel ==
Press to Meco

- Luke Caley – guitar, vocals
- Jake Crawford – bass, vocals
- Lewis Williams – drums, vocals

Additional personnel

- Machine – producer, mixing, mastering, engineer
- Julian Cargiulo – engineer
- Maximillian Malone – art and design

== Charts ==
Chart performance for Transmute
Chart (2021)	Peak position
Scottish Albums (Official Charts)	45
UK Independent Albums (Official Charts)	26
UK Rock & Metal Albums (Official Charts)	4
