= Mother Brain (disambiguation) =

Mother Brain is the main antagonist in the Metroid video game series, and the crossover fiction Captain N: The Game Master cartoon show based on it.

Mother Brain may also refer to:

- Mother Brain, a villain in the video game Chrono Trigger
- Mother Brain, the main antagonist of the video game Phantasy Star II
- Motherbrain, a 2019 album by Crobot
