= Thousand Thoughts (band) =

British alternative rock band

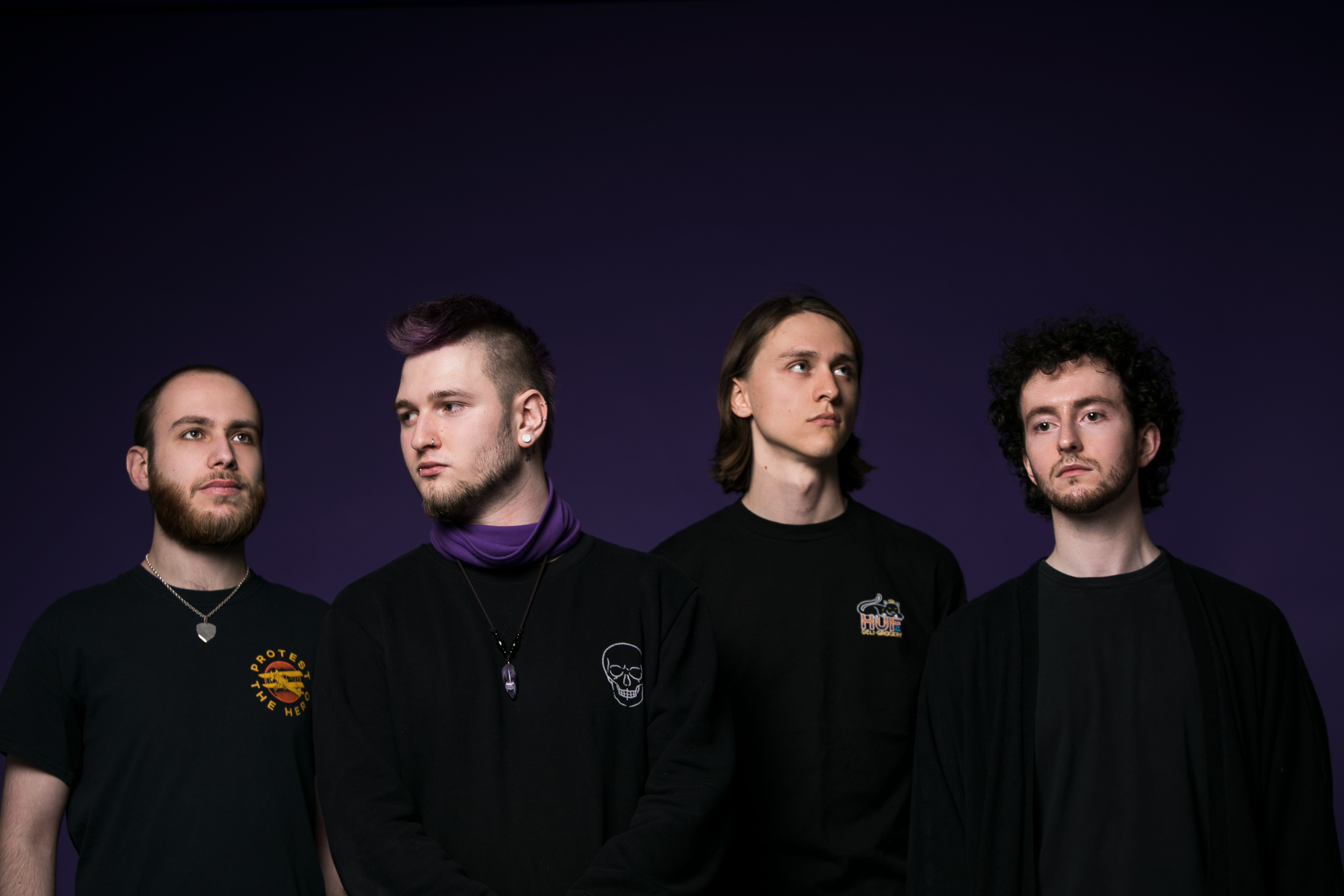
- From left to right: Will Fox, Ethan Lewis, Adam Field and Tom Caine

Background information
- Also known as: TT, Elswhere
- Origin: Enfield, London, England
- Genres: Nu Metal, Alternative Rock
- Years active: 2017–present
- Label: Independent
- Members: Ethan Lewis; Tom Caine; William Fox; Adam Field
- Past members: Ben Kay; Jack Botterill; Matt Morrell
- Website: https://thousandthoughtsmusic.com

Thousand Thoughts (or TT) are a British alternative rock band formed by Ethan Lewis in Enfield, North London. The group consists of lead vocalist Ethan Lewis, guitarist Tom Caine, guitarist William Fox and drummer Adam Field. They were originally known as Elswhere. The band signed to Marshall Records in 2017 and parted ways with Marshall Records in 2021. Their debut EP was released on 29 March 2019.

One of their guitarists, William Fox has his own Twitch Account under the name WillFox. He grew in popularity because of his 100% run of the song Through The Fire And Flames by Dragonforce at 165% speed and one of the guitarists for Dragonforce Herman Li reacted to the video and Praised William on his skills

== Band members ==
- Vocals: Ethan Lewis
- Guitars: Tom Caine
- Guitars: William Fox
- Drums: Adam Field

== Past members ==
- Bass: Matt Morrell
- Guitar: Jack Botterill
- Drums: Ben Kay

== Musical style, influences and band status ==
Thousand Thoughts musical style has been described as alternative rock. Their music takes on elements of nu-metal, pop-punk and alt-rock, interwoven with themes of tragedy and loss.

The band cite Linkin Park, Bring Me the Horizon, Avenged Sevenfold, Papa Roach and Beartooth as influences. On their debut EP, This One's For You, is influenced by the honesty of "Drown" by Bring Me the Horizon. While "Perspectives" has inspiration from Avenged Sevenfold, Linkin Park and Bring Me the Horizon. "Focus" is inspired by the honest dept of 'Black Hole Sun' by Soundgarden and "Ignite" was inspired by the rhythmic flow of "My Curse" by Killswitch Engage.

== Discography ==
Their single "This One's for You" was released on 22 June 2018 and their next single, "Perspectives", was released on 9 November 2018. Both were included on their self-titled EP, Thousand Thoughts, which released on 29 March 2019, also including the tracks "Focus" and "Ignite".

Their single "Saviour" was released on 27 September 2019. Vocalist Ethan Smith explains this track as 'the voice of a broken generation,' and acts as a sequel to 'This One's For You.'

Their single, "Change", was released on 25 October 2019, which featured Daigo Jax, a nu-metal/hip-hop rapper, which made his first ever studio appearance on the track.

The band released their debut album titled “Better Than Never” on 23 September 2022. 2 of the songs on the album (Circles and Undone) had music videos

=== Extended Plays ===
- Thousand Thoughts (2019)
1. This One's For You - 3:47
2. Perspectives - 3:53
3. Focus - 3:39
4. Ignite - 3:34

=== Albums ===
- Better Than Never (2022)
1. Mixtape - 1:54
2. Undone - 3:11
3. Circles - 3:27
4. Flip tha Switch - 3:35
5. Prisoner - 3:28
6. Rollercoaster (feat. Daigo Jax) - 3:42
7. Burnin' Up - 3:20
8. GTFO - 3:35
9. Melomaniac - 3:09
10. Cold - 3:43
11. Tunnel - 2:02
12. Me - 3:23

== Tours ==
Ethan Lewis, Matt Morrell and Jack Botterill from Thousand Thoughts performed an acoustic set supporting Press to MECO on their London tour dates of their acoustic tour.

- London Sixty Six Sounds: 5 March 2019
- London Sixty Six Sounds: 6 March 2019

Thousand Thoughts are supporting Inklings on a tour throughout the UK in 2019.

- Manchester The Castle Hotel: 29 October 2019
- Birmingham, Asylum 2: 30 October 2019
- London, Thousand Island: 3 November 2019

Thousand Thoughts opened for Bad Wolves on 29 January 2020 at Academy Islington in London.
