= Good Intent (album) =

Studio album by Press to Meco
- Released: 16 October 2015
- Recorded: 1 October – 12 November 2014
- Studio: The Ranch Production House, Southampton
- Length: 39:03
- Label: Best Before
- Producer: Neil Kennedy

Press to Meco chronology
Affinity (2013)	Good Intent (2015)	Here's to the Fatigue (2018)

Singles from Good Intent
- 1. "Means to an End" Released: 17 September 2015; 2. "Diffusion of Responsibility" Released: 25 January 2016; 3. "Autopsy" Released: 9 May 2016

Good Intent is the debut album by English alternative rock band, Press to Meco. Released on 16 October 2015 on Best Before Records, the album was produced by Neil Kennedy.

== Background and recording ==
Recording initially began during the first half of 2014 with Dan Weller (SikTh, Enter Shikari) but work had to be halted due to financial problems. Prior to the surfacing of these issues, the band released the track, "Family Ties" as a free download on 10 April 2014 from these sessions. Recording then resumed in October later that year, this time with Neil Kennedy who had handled production of the band's Affinity EP. Funded through a PledgeMusic campaign, the band achieved 144% of their target, with 5% of the goal being donated to the Teenage Cancer Trust. An additional 10% of the money raised over the targeted amount was also donated. Three previous songs from the Affinity EP - "Honestly", "Tired Bones" and title tack, "Affinity" - were re-recorded for the album, with work concluding on the record on 12 November 2014.

Speaking about the lyrical content of the album, drummer and vocalist Lewis Williams explained that, "It's about growing up and becoming far more aware of the world, the people around you and what being human means. Its manic, overthought, tongue-in-cheek and sarcastic at points. It's the stuff I'm trying to get out of my head at 3am." While discussing how the band wanted the record to sound sonically, guitarist and vocalist Luke Caley stated, "We wanted this album to be a lot rawer sounding and less produced than our previous recordings. Neil [Kennedy, producer] really nailed it too." Preceding the album's eventual release the following year on 16 October 2015, the band released lead single, "Means to an End" a month prior on 17 September.

== Critical reception ==
Upon its release, Good Intent received largely positive critical response. Rating the album four out of five, Already Heard summarised that the album was, "an excellent debut record that hits the sweet spot between heavy and melodic to offer a sound that's uniquely refreshing as it is catchy." In a similarly positive review, Hit the Floor described the album as a, "creative melting pot [that] aims to take the listener on a genre journey that will both surprise and inspire [them].", concluding that, "Good Intent is a spark of insanity and an original masterpiece." In another four out of five rated review, the Courier Online wrote: "Filled with math rock-inspired guitar noodles and bass-driven grooves, the band have put together a masterfully melodic debut record that doesn't invite comparisons, because the three-piece are in a league of their own." In a more critical review, Punktastic writer Rob Barbour noted a disconnect between the newer and older material on the album, stating, "We get the sense that the band have included some of these older songs in order to justify the release of a full-length album and subsequently the end result suffers. That's not to say 'Good Intent' is bad by any means, but rather than a cohesive album its simply a collection of good songs."

In August 2016, Good Intent was nominated for Independent Album of the Year at the 2016 AIM Independent Music Awards where it found itself up against the likes of A Moon Shaped Pool by Radiohead, Blossom by Frank Carter & the Rattlesnakes, The Ship by Brian Eno and Konnichiwa by Skepta amongst others. The band ultimately lost out to the Little Simz album, A Curious Tale of Trials + Persons.

== Track listing ==
Good Intent track listing
No.	Title	Length
1.	"Family Ties"	3:54
2.	"Diffusion of Responsibility"	3:15
3.	"Honestly"	3:43
4.	"Means to an End"	3:22
5.	"Autopsy"	3:39
6.	"Manipulate"	3:24
7.	"Affinity"	3:48
8.	"Apprehension"	3:45
9.	"Tired Bones"	3:19
10.	"Ghost"	2:43
11.	"Sacred Grounds"	4:13
Total length:		39:03

== Personnel ==
Press to Meco

- Luke Caley – guitar, vocals
- Adam Roffey – bass guitar, vocals
- Lewis Williams – drums, vocals

Additional personnel

- Neil Kennedy – producer, mixing
- Brad Boatright – mastering
- Ellie Price – piano (track 5)
