= Welcome to Fat City =

Studio album by Crobot
- Released: September 23, 2016
- Genre: Hard rock; blues rock; funk rock
- Label: Wind-up
- Producer: Machine

Crobot chronology
Something Supernatural (2014)	Welcome to Fat City (2016)	Motherbrain (2019)

Welcome to Fat City is the second studio album by Pennsylvania rock band Crobot, it is the last album to feature brothers Jake & Paul Figuero. It was Released 23 September 2016. They started recording the record in January 2016 with record producer Machine in Texas. They announced the album in June 2016 with the first official single "Not for Sale". They have since then released 3 song including title track "Welcome to Fat City", "Plague of the Mammoths" and new single "Play It Cool".

== Track listing ==
All tracks are written by Brandon Yeagley, Chris Bishop, Jacob Figueroa, and Paul Figueroa.

No.	Title	Length
1.	"Welcome to Fat City"	3:59
2.	"Play It Cool"	3:13
3.	"Easy Money"	3:41
4.	"Not for Sale"	2:53
5.	"Hold on for Dear Life"	4:48
6.	"Temple in the Sky"	3:15
7.	"Right Between the Eyes"	3:25
8.	"Blood on the Snow"	3:29
9.	"Steal the Show"	3:46
10.	"Moment of Truth"	4:46
11.	"Plague of the Mammoths"	3:00
Total length:		40:15

== Personnel ==
Crobot

- Brandon Yeagley – lead vocals, harmonica
- Chris Bishop – guitars, backing vocals
- Jacob Figueroa – bass, backing vocals
- Paul Figueroa – drums

Additional personnel

- Machine – production, engineering
- Alan Moulder – mixing
- Paul Blakemore – mastering
- D.J. Mackintosh – package design
- Chris Bishop – original artwork

== Charts ==
Chart (2016)	Peak position
UK Independent Albums (OCC)	31
UK Rock & Metal Albums (OCC)	21
US Top Hard Rock Albums (Billboard)	16
US Heatseekers Albums (Billboard)	14
US Top Rock Albums (Billboard)	38
