= Ben Jorgensen =

American singer (born 1983)

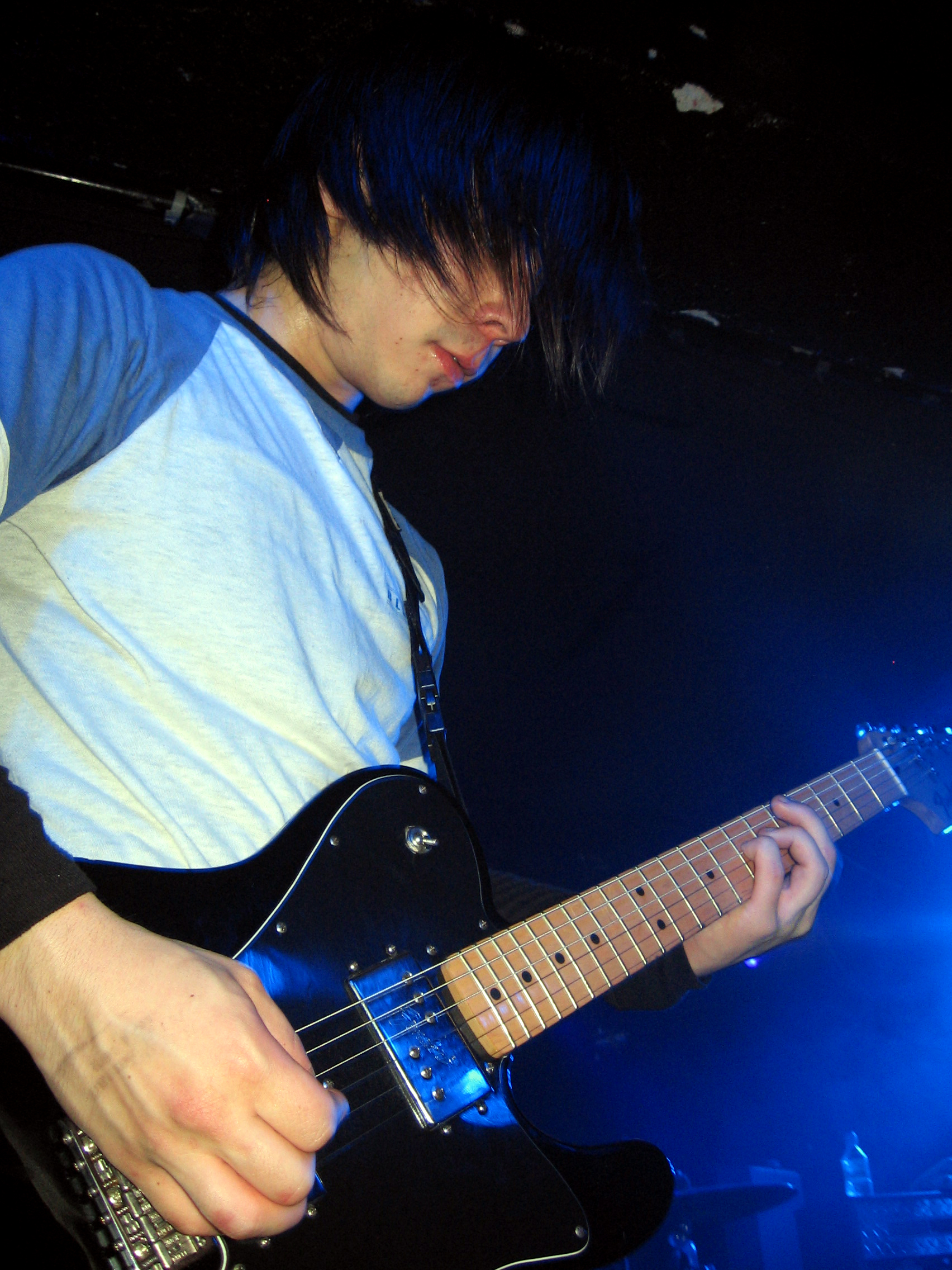
- Jorgensen performing live in 2006

Background information
- Born: Benjamin David Jorgensen; July 4, 1983 (age 43)
- Origin: Teaneck, New Jersey, U.S.
- Genres: Emo; pop punk; alternative rock
- Occupations: Musician; singer; songwriter; guitarist
- Instruments: Vocals; piano; guitar; keyboards; drums
- Labels: Equal Vision; Rude; Sire
- Spouse(s): Katrina Bowden (m. 2013; div. 2020) Kailey Cost (m. 2025)

Ben Jorgensen is an American musician, singer, songwriter and guitarist. He is best known as the lead singer and the guitarist of the rock band Armor for Sleep.

== Early life and education ==
Jorgensen grew up in Teaneck, New Jersey, and is of German, Danish, and Japanese descent. Jorgensen attended the Jewish day school, Solomon Schechter Day School of Bergen County, and the Solomon Schechter of Essex and Union, where he graduated in 2001.

== Musical career ==
Early in his musical career Jorgensen was the drummer for punk band Random Task. Jorgensen then formed Armor for Sleep in 2001. He began writing the first songs during the summer after his first year in college. Jorgensen recorded these songs as a demo CD for $100 at a local recording studio, with Jorgensen playing all the instruments himself. These songs were later re-recorded for Armor For Sleep's debut album, Dream to Make Believe, released in 2003 on Equal Vision Records.

Armor for Sleep disbanded in 2009 (though they would later reunite in 2020), and Jorgensen started an electronic project with Sierra Shardae, named God Loves a Challenge, which only released an unnamed EP of various tracks. Jorgensen recorded his debut solo EP, titled There Is Nowhere Left to Go, at Treehouse Studios in Jersey City, and was released on October 5, 2010 via digital download.

Jorgensen made a cameo appearance in Fall Out Boy's "Dance, Dance" video in 2005, and also in Cobra Starship's video for "The City Is at War," in 2007, playing alongside Pete Wentz as a policeman.

Jorgensen primarily uses Fender Telecaster Deluxe and Gibson SG as his guitars of choice.

== Personal life ==
In 2013, Jorgensen married actress Katrina Bowden. They divorced in 2020.

He is now married to Kailey Cost as of April 2025; Cost appeared in the video for Armor for Sleep's "Last Days", which is featured on the band's 2025 album, There Is No Memory.

== Discography ==
Armor for Sleep

- Dream to Make Believe (2003)
- What to Do When You Are Dead (2005)
- Smile For Them (2007)
- The Way Out Is Broken EP (2008)
- The Rain Museum (2022)
- There Is No Memory (2025)

God Loves A Challenge

- Various tracks (2009) self-released

Solo material

- There Is Nowhere Left To Go EP (October 5, 2010) self-released

=== Singles ===
==== Armor for Sleep ====
Year	Title	Album
2003	"Dream to Make Believe"	Dream to Make Believe
2004	"My Town"	Dream to Make Believe
2005	"Car Underwater"	What to Do When You Are Dead
2005	"The Truth About Heaven"	What to Do When You Are Dead
2006	"Remember to Feel Real"	What to Do When You Are Dead
2007	"Williamsburg"	Smile for Them
2008	"Hold the Door"	Smile for Them
2022	"How Far Apart"	The Rain Museum
2022	"Whatever, Who Cares"	The Rain Museum
2022	"New Rainbows"	The Rain Museum
2024	"In Another Dream"	There Is No Memory
2024	"What a Beautiful World"	There Is No Memory
2025	"Breathe Again"	There Is No Memory
2025	"The Outer Ring"	There Is No Memory
2025	"Last Days"	There Is No Memory
