= Press to Meco (EP) =

EP by Press to Meco
- Released: 9 July 2012
- Recorded: 2011
- Genre: Alternative rock; pop punk; progressive rock
- Length: 14:25
- Label: Self-released
- Producer: Mike Malyan

Press to Meco chronology
Press to Meco (2012)	Affinity (2013)

Press to Meco is the first EP by English alternative rock band, Press to Meco. Recorded in mid-2011 by Monuments drummer Mike Malyan, completion of the extended play endured lengthy delays before being released on 9 July 2012. A music video for opening track, “Burning the Reward” was produced and released to coincide with the EP's eventual release.

== Track listing ==
No.	Title	Length
1.	"Burning the Reward"	4:15
2.	"All the Same"	3:05
3.	"Loose Rooms"	3:21
4.	"Rational Way"	3:44

== Personnel ==
Press to Meco

- Luke Caley – guitar, vocals
- Adam Roffey – bass, vocals
- Lewis Williams – drums, vocals

Additional personnel

- Mike Malyan – producer, didgeridoo, piano, strings
- Paul Antonio Ortiz – mixing, mastering
- Andreu Mariner Piqueres – artwork
