= Affinity (EP) =

EP by Press to Meco
- Released: 27 May 2013
- Recorded: Late 2012 – early 2013
- Studios: The Ranch Production House, Southampton
- Genres: Alternative rock; progressive metal; pop punk; pop
- Length: 18:51
- Label: Self-released
- Producer: Neil Kennedy

Press to Meco chronology
Press to Meco (2012)	Affinity (2013)	Good Intent (2015)

Affinity is the second EP by English alternative rock band, Press to Meco. Released on 27 May 2013, the extended play was recorded at The Ranch Production House with Neil Kennedy – who would go on to produce the band's debut album, Good Intent. Three songs from the EP – "Tired Bones", "Honestly" and title track, "Affinity" – would also later be re-recorded for inclusion on Good Intent.

== Track listing ==
No.	Title	Length
1.	"Affinity"	3:44
2.	"Wasting Time"	3:31
3.	"Honestly"	3:44
4.	"Tired Bones"	3:22
5.	"Love and Reason"	4:30

== Personnel ==
Press to Meco

- Luke Caley – guitar, vocals
- Adam Roffey – bass, vocals
- Lewis Williams – drums, vocals

Additional personnel

- Neil D. Kennedy – producer, mixing
- Jim Harding – assistant engineer
- Robin Schmidt – mastering
- Andreu Mariner – artwork
