= Smile for Them =

Studio album by Armor for Sleep
- Released: October 30, 2007
- Recorded: April – June 2007
- Studio: The Machine Shop, Weehawken, New Jersey; Loho, New York City
- Genre: Emo; post-hardcore
- Length: 46:04
- Label: Sire
- Producer: Machine

Armor for Sleep chronology
What to Do When You Are Dead (2005)	Smile for Them (2007)	The Way Out Is Broken (2008)

Singles from Smile for Them
- 1. "Williamsburg" Released: September 18, 2007; 2. "Hold the Door" Released: February 12, 2008

Smile for Them is the third studio album by American rock band Armor for Sleep, released on October 30, 2007, through Sire Records. Shortly after the release of their second studio album What to Do When You Are Dead (2005), the band were writing material for its follow-up. In early 2006, the band announced they had signed to Sire Records, recording demos not long after. At the end of the year, they started recording with Ben Grosse in California, but after a few months, the songs were scrapped. Recording restarted with Machine as producer, with sessions taking place at The Machine Shop in Weehawken, New Jersey and Loho Studios in New York City. Smile for Them is an emo and post-hardcore album, recalling the works of Foo Fighters, the Smashing Pumpkins and Quicksand, that deals with celebrity culture.

Smile for Them received mixed reviews from critics, some of whom praised the production from Machine, while others found the songwriting to be uninspired. The album peaked at number 93 on the US Billboard 200, after selling 9,400 copies in its first week. "Williamsburg" was released as the lead single from Smile for Them in September 2007. Prior to the album's release, the band supported the Academy Is... on their tour, before playing a few headlining shows towards the end of the year. At the start of 2007, the band went on a co-headlining US tour with Saosin, which was followed by the release of the album's second single, "Hold the Door", in February 2008. They then went on the Bamboozle Roadshow tour for the next three months, appeared at the Bamboozle Left festival, and then trekked across the country as part of the Projekt Revolution in July and August 2008.

== Background and production ==
Armor for Sleep released their second studio album What to Do When You Are Dead through Equal Vision Records in February 2005. It was promoted with two tours of the United States, leading up to an appearance on the 2005 Warped Tour. They recorded some material on their bus using Pro Tools while on the latter tour. Shortly after this, the band performed a new song, titled "The Way Out Is Broken". On January 12, 2006, the group released a demo of the song. The band had been reportedly working on the track for their third album, which was planned for release later in 2006. The following month, frontman Ben Jorgensen revealed that the band had their next album fully written and was planning to record it after current touring engagements had ended. On April 10, it was announced that the band had signed to Sire Records. In the same announcement, it was revealed that the group would not release an album until the following year. The band then recorded demos at a studio in New Jersey, before performing on the 2006 Warped Tour.

In December 2006, it was announced that the band were recording at Mix Room in Burbank, California with producer Ben Grosse. These sessions were arranged by Sire; the band were not content with the proceedings. They had done seven-to-eight songs over three months, before touring with Taking Back Sunday and Underoath in February and March 2007. Towards the end of the trek, Armor for Sleep opted to scrap what they had made up to that point and being again. More demos were recorded with Ryan Sellick at Northshore Studio in Ridgefield, Connecticut, with engineer Dan Scarzella. Smile for Them was recorded at The Machine Shop in Weehawken, New Jersey with producer Machine between April and June 2007. Drums were recorded at Loho Studios in New York City. Machine, Will Putney and Dan McLoughlin served as engineers throughout the sessions, while Putney and Sellick also handled additional tracking and drum editing. Machine mixed seven of the recordings; Neal Avron mixed the remaining songs. Ted Jensen then mastered the album at Sterling Sound in New York City.

== Composition ==
Musically, the sound of Smile for Them has been described as emo and post-hardcore, reminiscent of the works of the Foo Fighters, the Smashing Pumpkins and Quicksand. AbsolutePunk staff writer Drew Beringer said Jorgensen wrote "lyrics about a culture that’s dependant and obsessed with celebrity news and reality television, among other social commentaries". Punknews.org staff writer Tyler Barrett added to this, stating that while "[i]mmersed in a sterile, fictional reality, the young protagonist rejects the plastic, planned world of hallow celebrity and Hollywood safety". Jorgensen saw it as an observation on culture, in contrast to the introspective style of What to Do When You Are Dead. He treated the release as two mini-albums, with the break occurring between "Snow Globe" and "End of the World", the latter of which was originally planned to the open the album. Jorgensen would typically come up with a part and show it to the rest of the band, who add their own ideas to it. They collectively wrote 40 songs in total for potential inclusion on the album.

The majority of the tracks on Smile for Them were written by the band, with the exception of "Hold the Door" and "Stand in the Spotlight". These two were co-written between the band, Machine and Jon Deley. It opens with the emo song "Smile for the Camera"; Jorgensen said since the last album the band attracted the attention of a lot of people, "and it’s just kind of making commentary on people who kind of have the impression that they are trapped in their own reality tv show". "Williamsburg" sees Jorgensen callout hipsters in Brooklyn, New York City. Jorgensen explained: "It's weird because part of what gets you into the cool club is being condescending", which he found annoying. "Hold the Door" recalled the material on What to Do When You Are Dead due to its use of electronic sounds. "Run Right Back In" is an My Chemical Romance-esque track, while "Snow Globe" incorporates subtle strings. "End of the World" deals with the apocalypse and the effects of global warming. "Lullaby" includes acoustic guitarwork; Jorgensen said it tackled the four-year relationship he was in that ended during the making of the album. "Chemicals" features a Moog synthesizer, while "My Saving Grace" features similar electronic beats.

== Release and promotion ==
In the midst of recording, they appeared at The Bamboozle festival. On July 18, 2007, the band's next album was announced for release in a few months' time. In addition to this, "End of the World" was posted on the band's Myspace profile. Between September and November 2007, the group supported The Academy Is... on their Sleeping with Giants tour. On September 18, 2007, Smile for Them was announced for release in three weeks' time. Alongside this, "Williamsburg" was released as the album's lead single and "Smile for the Camera" was posted online. After originally planned for release in mid-2007, Smile for Them was made available for streaming on October 25, 2007, before being released through Sire Records five days later. The album's artwork shows a child surrounded by photographers; Jorgensen eaplied: "[Y]ou have the innocence of this little kid who’s just trying to mind his own business on one side. And then on the other, it’s this oppressive camera crew that’s getting in his face".

The day after the album's release, a music video was released for "Williamsburg". It premiered on Total Request Live; it acts as a tutorial on dressing like a hipster. They ended the year with a handful of headlining shows. In January and February 2008, the band went on a co-headlining US tour with Saosin. They were supported by the Bled and Meriwether. "Hold the Door" was released to radio on February 12. Between late March and early May, the group performed on the Bamboozle Roadshow with Saves the Day, Set Your Goals and Metro Station. The stint included an appearance at the Bamboozle Left festival. In July and August 2008, the band participated in the 2008 edition of the Projekt Revolution tour. The music videos for "Williamsburg" and "Hold the Door" were later posted to YouTube in October 2009.

== Reception ==
Professional ratings
Review scores
Source	Rating
AbsolutePunk	66%
Melodic	3.5/5 stars
Ox-Fanzine	6/10
The Phoenix	2.5/4 stars
PopMatters	3/10
Punknews.org	2.5/5 stars
Rock Hard	7/10

Smile for Them was met with mixed reviews from music critics. The staff at AllMusic said the band had their "rock moves down to a science, [...] it's radio rock made in a way that very few young bands remember how to do". Beringer said that while the album lacked a hit song, it did feature a "number of solid tracks that could do well," highlighting "Williamsburg" and "Lullaby". He complimented the "superb" and "pristine" production, but noted that some fans would "miss the lyrics and concepts that graced the first two albums". Mikael Wood of The Phoenix considered it "refreshing to hear a bitchy emo record that doesn’t direct all its ire toward the heartless females". Rock Hard's Katharina Pfeifle said the band offered 12 "pretty fresh and free-sounding" tracks, though they were a "little too polished and tailored to the target audience". Barrett praised the band for "put[ting] their major label budget to use" as the production is "rich enough to cover all the bases of popular rock music".

David Schumann of Ox-Fanzine felt like the band's past albums, Smile for Them "just doesn't really work for me either" as the melodies came across as too "interchangeable, too unspectacular" and the hooks were "boldly produced refrains," yet "too transparent and predictable". Melodic staff member Kaj Roth said that aside from the delay guitar effect, the album "follows formula 1A of a popular emo record". He wrote that they will not be "breaking new grounds" with tracks such as "My Saving Grace" and "Chemicals", giving unfavorable comparisons to Fall Out Boy and My Chemical Romance, "but who says everything has to be ground breaking?". Exclaim! writer Sam Sutherland said the album "utterly fails to rein in the band's boring pop tendencies," which had been "so well in check on past records". He went on to call it a "massive-sounding, hella dull record about some whiny shit that no one but [...] Jorgensen probably cares about". PopMatters contributor Chris Baynes said he "needn’t have bothered" listening to the album, saying it was full of "tired riffs," with a "predictable subject matter, these hackneyed lyrics, which have all been done before by a hundred bands of the same genus".

Smile for Them peaked at number 93 on Billboard 200, selling 9,400 copies in its first week.

== Track listing ==
All lyrics written by Ben Jorgensen, all music written by Armor for Sleep, except "Hold the Door" and "Stand in the Spotlight" by Machine, Jon Deley and Armor for the Sleep.

No.	Title	Length
1.	"Smile for the Camera"	3:34
2.	"Williamsburg"	3:42
3.	"Somebody Else's Arms"	4:22
4.	"Hold the Door"	5:34
5.	"Run Right Back In"	3:22
6.	"Snow Globe"	1:48
7.	"End of the World"	4:10
8.	"Stars in Your Eyes"	4:02
9.	"Lullaby"	4:09
10.	"Chemicals"	4:22
11.	"My Saving Grace"	4:19
12.	"Stand in the Spotlight"	4:00

== Personnel ==
Personnel per booklet.

Armor for Sleep

- Ben Jorgensen – lead vocals, guitar
- Anthony Dilonno – bass guitar
- PJ Decicco – guitar
- Nash Breen – drums

Additional musicians

- Rinat Arinos – additional vocal arrangements (tracks 1 and 10)
- Jon Deley – programming
- Clinton Bradley – programming, sound design
- Machine – sound design

Production and design

- Machine – producer, engineer, mixing (tracks 6–12)
- Neal Avron – mixing (tracks 1–5)
- Will Putney – engineer, additional tracking, drum editing
- Dan McLoughlin – engineer
- Ryan Sellick – additional tracking, drum editing
- Ted Jensen – mastering
- Dan Scarzella – additional engineer
- Pamela Littky – album photography
- Bill Scoville – art direction, design

== Charts ==
Chart performance for Smile for Them
Chart (2007)	Peak position
US Billboard 200	93
