= Motherbrain =

Studio album by Crobot
- Released: August 23, 2019
- Genre: Hard rock; heavy metal; psychedelic rock; stoner rock
- Length: 42:31
- Label: Mascot
- Producer: Corey Lowery

Crobot chronology
Welcome to Fat City (2016)	Motherbrain (2019)	Feel This (2022)

Singles from Motherbrain
- 1. "Keep Me Down" Released: May 17, 2019; 2. "Low Life" Released: July 24, 2019; 3. "Burn" Released: August 23, 2019; 4. "Gasoline" Released: May 7, 2020

Professional ratings
Review scores
Source	Rating
Classic Rock	4/5 stars
Cryptic Rock	4.5/5 stars
Distorted Sound	9/10
Metal Revolution	75/100

Motherbrain is the third studio album by American hard rock band, Crobot. The album was released on August 23, 2019 through Mascot Records, their debut on the label.

Four singles were released in promotion of the album: "Keep Me Down", "Low Life", "Burn", and "Gasoline". "Low Life" reached number 10 on the Billboard Mainstream Rock charts, their highest charting single to date.

== Track listing ==
No.	Title	Writer(s)	Length
1.	"Burn"	Christopher Bishop; Brandon Yeagley; Brian Vodinh	3:25
2.	"Keep Me Down"	Bishop; Yeagley; Corey Lowery; James Lascu	3:48
3.	"Drown"	Bishop; Yeagley; Lascu	4:02
4.	"Low Life"	Bishop; Yeagley; Johnny Andrews	3:37
5.	"Alpha Dawg"	Bishop; Yeagley	3:51
6.	"Stoning the Devil"	Bishop; Yeagley	4:34
7.	"Gasoline"	Bishop; Yeagley; Lowery	3:34
8.	"Destroyer"	Bishop; Yeagley	3:54
9.	"Blackout"	Bishop; Yeagley; Lowery	3:59
10.	"Afterlife"	Bishop; Yeagley; Lowery	3:51
11.	"The Hive"	Bishop; Yeagley; Lowery	3:58
Total length:			42:31

== Personnel ==
Crobot

- Brandon Yeagley – lead vocals, harmonica
- Chris Bishop – guitars, bass, backing vocals
- Dan Ryan – drums

Additional personnel

- Corey Lowery – producer, mixing, engineering, bass
- Paul Logus – mastering
- Roy Koch – design layout
- Chris Bishop – original album artwork

== Charts ==
Chart performance for Motherbrain
Chart (2019)	Peak position
US Heatseekers Albums (Billboard)	6
US Independent Albums (Billboard)	25
