= The Way Out Is Broken =

EP by Armor for Sleep
- Released: September 5, 2008
- Genre: Alternative rock; pop punk; indie rock; emo
- Length: 18:35
- Label: Sire

Armor for Sleep chronology
Smile for Them (2007)	The Way Out Is Broken (2008)	The Rain Museum (2022)

Professional ratings
Review scores
Source	Rating
AbsolutePunk	79% link

The Way Out Is Broken is the fourth release and first EP from New Jersey band Armor for Sleep. It was their last release before their disbandment in 2009 (and subsequent reunion in 2020).

== Background and release ==
While on tour in fall 2005, Armor for Sleep performed a new song, titled "The Way Out Is Broken". On January 12, 2006, the group released a demo of the song. The band had been reportedly working on the song for their third album. In July 2008, the band announced they would release an EP consisting of songs from their previous recording sessions later in the summer. On August 21, "The Way Out Is Broken" was made available for streaming through the band's Myspace profile.

It is exclusively a digital download EP, and has not been released on a physical medium. Fans could purchase a download card from Armor for Sleep during the later dates of the 2008 Projekt Revolution tour, allowing them to download the EP on the day of its release.

== Track listing ==
1. "This Abyss" – 3:43
2. "Vanished" – 3:26
3. "We'll Own the World" – 3:23
4. "Know What You Have" – 4:54
5. "The Way Out Is Broken" – 3:29

== Personnel ==
- Ben Jorgensen – lead vocals, rhythm guitar, piano
- PJ DeCicco – lead guitar
- Anthony DiIonno – bass, backing vocals
- Nash Breen – drums, percussion
