= Crobot =

American rock band

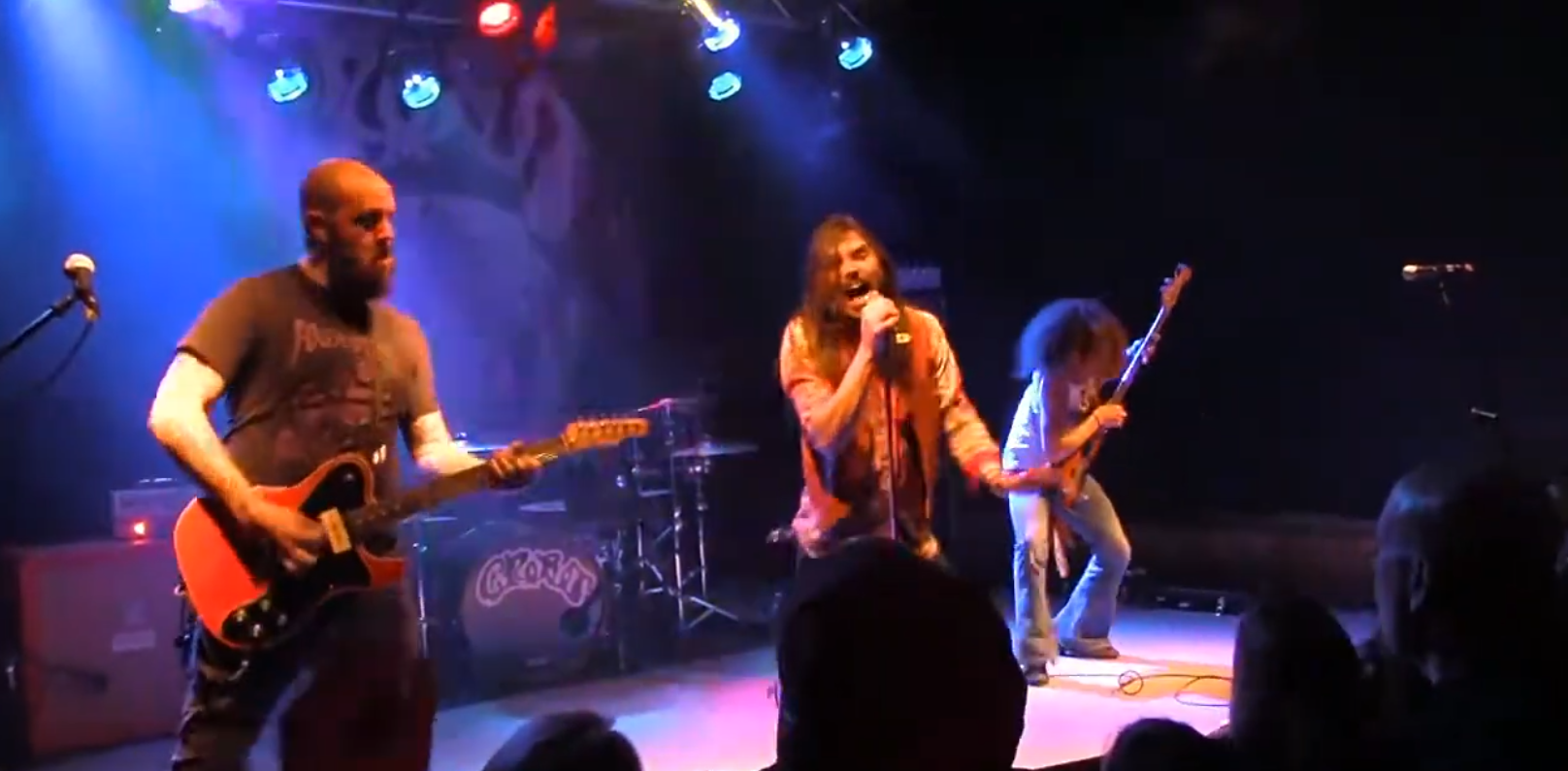

Background information
- Origin: Pottsville, Pennsylvania, U.S.
- Genres: Hard rock; stoner rock
- Years active: 2011–present
- Labels: Wind-up; Mascot
- Members: Brandon Yeagley; Chris Bishop; Willie Jansen; Nico Jansen
- Past members: Jake Figueroa; Paul Figueroa; Alexander Lascu; Keith McGonigle; Eddie Collins; Tim Peugh; Dan Ryan; Pat Seal
- Website: crobotband.com

Crobot is an American hard rock band from Pottsville, Pennsylvania, composed of Brandon Yeagley, Chris Bishop and brothers Willie and Nico Jansen. Formed in 2011, the band has released six studio albums.

== History ==
=== Beginnings ===
In mid-2011, Brandon Yeagley and Chris Bishop created Crobot, joined later by brothers Paul and Jake Figueroa, who previously performed similar styles of music in another band. In 2012 the band's original lineup self-released their debut EP, The Legend of the Spaceborne Killer, along with a music video for the eponymous first single. Later that year, the rhythm section of the band was revamped with the addition of the Figueroa brothers on bass and drums. The Figueroa brothers departed from the band early 2017 and were replaced by Dan Ryan on drums and James Alexander Lascu on bass in June 2017.

=== Wind-up Records ===
In 2013, Crobot was discovered by Wind-up Records, and was officially signed in December. On May 13, 2014, they released their self-titled EP, produced by Machine (Clutch, Lamb of God, Cobra Starship, Gym Class Heroes). The EP featured four tracks from their upcoming full-length album and received positive reviews. Their first single and video for "Nowhere to Hide" debuted on Revolver on May 14, 2014 and hit number 16 on the Billboard Mainstream Rock chart. In May, Crobot was added to the 2014 lineup for Taco Bell's Feed the Beat campaign.

In 2014, the band toured with Chevelle, Clutch, The Sword, Truckfighters, KYNG, Kill Devil Hill, in addition to playing festivals such as SXSW, Rock on the Range, and Summerfest. They embarked on their first UK tour in September 2014, with The Virginmarys. Crobot performed at the "ShipRocked" music festival at sea from February 2–6 with Limp Bizkit, Black Label Society, Buckcherry, and fellow Wind-Up Records band Filter. The band then headed to Europe for a stint with Black Label Society and Anthrax before returning to the U.S. in April for a tour starting in Denver. At the end of September 2015 Crobot performed again at sea as part of the Motorhead's Motorboat line-up. They also supported Motorhead and Anthrax on a few warm-up dates prior to the Motorboat in September 2015. On June 8, 2016, Crobot released their new single "Not for Sale" taken from their second studio album Welcome to Fat City, released September 23.

=== Mascot Records ===
In November 2018, Crobot signed with Mascot Records leading up to the release of their newest album Motherbrain in August 2019.

In February 2019, Crobot entered the studio in Atlanta with Corey Lowery of Seether who produced, mixed and engineered Motherbrain. Lowery also contributed playing bass. The album was released on August 23, 2019, and achieved a #6 position in the Billboard Heatseekers Albums chart. The first single from Motherbrain, "Low Life", achieved a #10 position on the Billboard Mainstream Rock Songs chart in February 2020.

In 2021, the band released their Rat Child EP. The four-track project features Steel Panther's Stix Zadina, Light the Torch's Howard Jones, and bassist Frank Bello of Anthrax.

On March 10, 2022, the band announced their new album Feel This, alongside the lead single "Better Times." The album was released on June 3, 2022.

On July 12, 2023, the band released a recording of Janet Jackson's "Black Cat".

== Musical style ==
Crobot describes their music as "Dirty. Groove. Rock.", and has been compared to hard rock bands like Wolfmother, Queens of the Stone Age, Rage Against the Machine and Soundgarden. Frontman Brandon Yeagley has been praised for his power packed vocals and dynamic stage presence, guiding the band's "undeniably magnetizing live shows."

== Members ==
Current

- Brandon Yeagley – lead vocals, harmonica (2011–present)
- Chris Bishop – guitars, backing vocals (2011–present)
- Willie Jansen – bass (2025–present)
- Nico Jansen – drums (2025–present)

Former

- Keith McGonigle – drums (2011– 2013)
- Sam Grim – bass (2011–2013)
- Jake Figueroa – bass (2013– 2016)
- Paul Figueroa – drums (2013–2016)
- Alexander Lascu – bass (2016–2019)
- Dan Ryan – drums (2017–2025)
- Eddie Collins – bass (2019–2021)
- Tim Peugh – bass (2021–2022)
- Pat Seals – bass (2023–2025)

Timeline

== Discography ==
=== Studio albums ===
List of studio albums, with selected chart positions
Title	Album details	Peak chart positions			
Title	Album details	US Hard	US Heat.	US Indie.	US Rock
Something Supernatural	Released: October 28, 2014; Label: Wind-up	18	8	—	—
Welcome to Fat City	Released: September 23, 2016; Label: Wind-up	16	13	—	48
Motherbrain	Released: August 23, 2019; Label: Mascot	—	6	25	—
Feel This	Released: June 3, 2022; Label: Mascot	—	—	—	—
Obsidian	Released: September 13, 2024; Label: self-released	—	—	—	—
Supermoon	Released: May 1, 2026; Label: self-released	—	—	—	—

=== Extended plays ===
- Legend of the Spaceborne Killer (2012)
- Crobot (2014)
- Rat Child (2021)

=== Singles ===
List of singles, showing year released and album
Title	Year	Peak chart positions		Album
Title	Year	US Air.	US Main.	Album
"Nowhere to Hide"	2014	49	16	Something Supernatural
"Legend of the Spaceborne Killer"	2015	–	32	Something Supernatural
"Not for Sale"	2016	—	—	Welcome to Fat City
"Keep Me Down"	2019	—	—	Motherbrain
"Low Life"	2019	36	10	Motherbrain
"Burn"	2019	—	—	Motherbrain
"Gasoline"	2020	—	24	Motherbrain
"Mountain" (featuring Frank Bello)	2021	—	—	Rat Child
"Better Times"	2022	—	—	Feel This
"Set You Free"	2022	—	22	Feel This
"Golden"	2022	49	16	Feel This
"Black Cat"	2023	—	—	Non-album single
