= Here's to the Fatigue =

Studio album by Press to Meco
- Released: 30 March 2018
- Recorded: 12 September – 8 October 2016
- Studio: The Machine Shop, Austin, Texas
- Length: 40:35
- Label: Marshall Records
- Producer: Machine

Press to Meco chronology
Good Intent (2015)	Here's to the Fatigue (2018)	Acoustic (2019)

Singles from Here's to the Fatigue
- 1. "If All Your Parts Don't Make a Whole" Released: 31 July 2017; 2. "Here's to the Fatigue" Released: 18 September 2017; 3. "Familiar Ground" Released: 14 February 2018

Here's to the Fatigue is the second album by English alternative rock band Press to Meco, released on 30 March 2018.

== Background and recording ==
Having spent much of 2016 writing their follow up to debut album Good Intent, the band went into pre-production for their second album at the end of August the same year. This process took place over the course of a week with producer Machine (Lamb of God, Every Time I Die, Clutch) in Croydon before relocating to Austin, Texas in September to begin recording. Production wrapped on 8 October 2016 and the band returned to the UK where they would spend much of 2017 searching for a label to release the album. With discussions ultimately proving fruitless, the trio instead announced on 31 July that they would be self-releasing Here's to the Fatigue on 17 November 2017, debuting lead single, "If All Your Parts Don't Make a Whole" alongside the announcement. Second single, title track "Here's to the Fatigue", followed on 18 September with the band also announcing a six-date UK tour that winter in support of the release. Discussing what do expect from their sophomore effort, drummer and vocalist Lewis Williams explained that "the new songs focus a lot on becoming disillusioned with your life and more emotionally weary with age. The album has a lot of existential angst, but also a few moments of clarity where it's saying just to let go, lift your legs and float down the stream."

A week before its expected release however, the band announced that they would no longer be releasing the album in November 2017 as previously stated, later revealing that they had signed to Marshall Records who would in turn put out the album. As one of the labels they had originally discussed the release with, the band were contacted two weeks before the original release date with a revised offer from the record company. Explaining their reconsideration of Marshall Records, guitarist and vocalist Luke Caley explained, "We met up and we were sceptical because of how things were before. The way the label was set-up back then wasn't really aligned with what we were about and what we felt could benefit the band. We sat down and after an hour or two-hour meeting, we came away feeling it was the right thing to do. This is going to make the album bigger then [sic] if we self-released it. It's worth pulling it and rescheduling." Third single, "Familiar Ground", followed on 14 February 2018 with Here's to the Fatigue finally seeing its release a month later on 30 March 2018.

== Critical reception ==
Much like their debut, Here's to the Fatigue received critical acclaim upon its release. Distorted Sound awarded the album 9/10, noting that, "This is the sound of a unique, talented, inspired young band really honing what they are and distilling their very essence to several key ingredients: a mastery of their instruments, an advanced understanding of both technicality and melody and where to balance the two, a sincere and concise carefree message and attitude to life and a fresh, captivating grasp on what pop-meets-alt-rock should be." Writing for Hit the Floor, James Fitzgerald commended the band's evolution, noting, "Press to MECO have built upon the solid foundation of their debut, delivering an album that's not just technically impressive but also filled with undeniably massive tunes." In a four out of five star review, Punknews praised the album's production, stating, "It feels huge (especially for a 3-piece), with a perfect combination of power and sheen that emphasises equally the strength of technical ability and vocal work." The band also received a 4K review from Kerrang!

== Track listing ==
Here's to the Fatigue track listing
No.	Title	Length
1.	"Intro"	0:42
2.	"Familiar Ground"	3:39
3.	"Here's to the Fatigue"	4:01
4.	"If All Your Parts Don't Make a Whole"	2:57
5.	"Skip the Crawl"	3:47
6.	"A Place in It All"	4:20
7.	"Howl"	3:34
8.	"A Quick Fix"	3:36
9.	"Itchy Fingers"	4:32
10.	"The Things That We Don't Talk About"	4:01
11.	"White Knuckling"	5:26
Total length:		40:35

== Personnel ==
Press to Meco

- Luke Caley – guitar, vocals
- Adam Roffey – bass, vocals
- Lewis Williams – drums, vocals

Additional personnel

- Machine – producer, mixing
