= Dream to Make Believe =

Studio album by Armor for Sleep
- Released: June 3, 2003
- Recorded: August 2002
- Studios: El Barrio, Van Nuys, California; Standard Electrical, Venice Beach, California
- Genres: Emo pop; space rock
- Length: 39:12
- Label: Equal Vision
- Producer: Ariel Rechtshaid

Armor for Sleep chronology
Dream to Make Believe (2003)	What to Do When You Are Dead (2005)

Dream to Make Believe is the debut studio album by American rock band Armor for Sleep. Following on from his previous band Random Task, Ben Jorgensen taught himself guitar and later recruited additional members to form Armor for Sleep. With some buzz, and the addition of manager Gabe Saporta, the band recorded their debut album with Ariel Rechtshaid at two studios in California: El Barrio in Van Nuys and Standard Electrical in Venice Beach.

Armor for Sleep formally announced they had signed to independent label Equal Vision Records in early 2003, and went on two tours following this. Dream to Make Believe was released on June 3, where it was met with a generally positive reaction from music critics, with some finding it a highly enjoyable listen. Exclaim! included it at number seven on their list of the best punk albums of the year. The album was promoted with four US tours, continuing into mid-2004. Music videos were released for the title-track and "My Town" in early and mid-2004 respectively.

== Background and production ==
Influenced by local acts Lifetime and Saves the Day, Ben Jorgensen formed the punk rock act Random Task with friends from school. Though he was initially a drummer, he started playing guitar when his bandmates would leave their instruments at his mom's home. The group attracted attention from two record labels, however, the members' parents were "too scared at the time to let us do anything like that." Before Jorgensen started college, he spent the preceding season writing material and taped two songs ("Dream to Make Believe" and "Slip Like Space") at a local studio in August 2001. Jorgensen wished to record more, but felt daunted by the task of playing every instrument by himself, he recruited bassist Anthony Dilonno, They recorded a demo in October 2001, which consisted of "All Warm", "Phantoms Now" and "Pointless Forever"; they combined this and the two previously done songs, and sold them as a five-track demo release.

Armor for Sleep soon began attracting buzz; they were due to appear on a Victory Records compilation, though were later taken off. In April 2002, it was rumored that the band would be releasing their debut album through independent label Equal Vision Records later in the year. Gabe Saporta of Midtown became the group's manager; Saporta viewed Jorgensen as a younger brother-type of figure and wanted to help him avoid issues in the music industry that he experienced with Midtown. After the producer the band enlisted for their debut went missing, Saporta put them in contact with Ariel Rechtshaid. They recorded over five weeks from August 2002 at El Barrio in Van Nuys, California and Standard Electrical Recorders in Venice Beach, California. Rechtshaid acted as the producer and handled engineering, with additional engineering from Chris Fudurich. Chris Knight served as the assistant at Standard Electrical. Rechtshaid mixed the recordings, before they were mastered by Brian Gardner at Bernie Grundman Mastering in Hollywood, California. Jorgensen later said that they made the album "little too early [into their career] and rushed into the process".

== Composition ==
Musically, the sound of Dream to Make Believe mixed space rock in the vein of Hum with emo pop in the style of the Get Up Kids. Comparisons were drawn musically and lyrically to Jimmy Eat World and Further Seems Forever, while Jorgensen's vocals were compared to Legends of Rodeo frontman John Ralston. Jorgensen wrote the majority of the material "in my room with the walls of my own skull as pretty much the only things to bounce ideas off of". DeCicco said they were attempting to differ themselves from their contemporaries with the space rock sound, they "wanted to almost bring like Thursday meets Radiohead and put it somewhere in between, and just kind of give it a little more."

The album is based on one theme, which evolved out of a poetry class Jorgensen took while in college. Though he disliked the class, he realized "since you're forced to write in one specific way your originality can come through." Jorgensen's lyrics were centered around inspection, with elements of darkness and melancholy, and tackling the topics of dreaming, space and time-travel. Rechtshaid contributed synthesizers to the recordings. The opening track is an instrumental titled "Armor for Sleep", which lasts for 45 seconds.

== Release ==
In the midst of recording the band went through membership changes, with drummer Nash Breen and guitarist PJ DeCicco, both of whom were cousins of Jorgensen and members of Prevent Falls, joining shortly at the end of August 2002. They then supported Midtown on their US tour in September 2002. Demos of songs that would feature on the album were hosted on Armor for Sleep's website, namely of the songs "All Warm", "Being Your Walls", "The Wanderers Guild" and "Slip Like Space". Armor for Sleep formally announced their signing to Equal Vision on January 18, 2003. In February, the group went on tour with Hey Mercedes. Shortly afterwards, they performed at the South by Southwest music conference. In March and April, the band toured across the US with Northstar, This Day Forward, and Breaking Pangaea, leading to an appearance at Skate and Surf Fest. In May and June, the group went on tour with A Static Lullaby, Time in Malta and the Bled, and performed at The Bamboozle festival. Dream to Make Believe was released through Equal Vision on June 3, 2003; a release show was held for a crowd of 500 people. The Japanese edition included the bonus track "Pointless Forever".

In August 2003, the band performed at Krazy Fest 6 in Louisville, Kentucky and Go Time Fest. In September 2003, the band played a few shows with labelmates This Day Forward, and played at a CMJ showcase. In November and December 2003, Armor for Sleep supported Vendetta Red on their headlining US tour. On December 16, 2003, a music video for "Dream to Make Believe" was posted online. In February 2004, the band went tour with the A.K.A.s. The following month, the group went on the Equal Vision Records Tour with Bane and Silent Drive. Between late April and early June, the group went on a US tour with Midtown and Your Enemies Friends. They were supported on select dates by Time and Distance, the Working Title, Stars Hide Fire, Vise Versa, Emanuel and Lance's Hero. On July 1, a music video for "My Town" was posted online. The video was directed by Andrew Paul. In July and August, the group went on tour with Fall Out Boy, Bayside, the Academy Is... and Name Taken.

== Reception ==
Professional ratings
Review scores
Source	Rating
AllMusic	3/5 stars
Alternative Press	3/5
Kerrang!	4/5 stars
Melodic	3/5 stars
Punknews.org	3/5 stars

Dream to Make Believe received generally positive reviews from music critics. In Music We Trust writer Vinnie Apicella opened his review by calling it "an amazing record" by "talented musicians". The release set itself apart from other works by its thematic choice; it saw the group incorporate "edgy and quick minor chording technique accentuated by mild harmonic runs, lingering resonance, and Ben Jorgensen's thoughtful croon." Exclaim!'s Jasamine White-Gluz said it was a "beautifully" crafted record, encapsulating "a sort of naive innocence that probably wouldn't be possible" if Jorgensen was "old enough to drink." She complimented the group for coming up with "the perfect emo record without being too cheesy or cliché". Kaj Roth ofMelodic said despite the members' ages, they made "quite a good debut", delivering "good songs in a good performance."

AllMusic reviewer Kurt Morris said the release "showcases another band partaking in the propagation of the emo movement" with "slight variations have been made to the sound so as to distinguish them" from their peers. Though he clarified, "[t]hat's not to say that what's here isn't good", the usage of "hooks and some good lyrics are key and come in at the right places". Punknews.org staff member Megan said only the pre-release demos our the only highlights on the album, with the rest being "a slow drudge of songs that don't really evoke any emotion." She criticized Jorgensen's voice as "often sound[ing] whiny and nasal", and since they are the "focal point of the music, they shouldn't sound so horrid. It's almost like nails on a chalkboard." LAS Magazine writer Jonah Flicker bluntly said the group "isn't doing anything new, and not much good either." As "excuses and half-assed endorsements a good record do not make. Let Armor for Sleep take a nice long nap."

Exclaim! ranked it at number seven on their Best Punk Album of the year list.

== Track listing ==
All songs written by Ben Jorgensen.

No.	Title	Length
1.	"Armor for Sleep" (instrumental)	0:45
2.	"Dream to Make Believe"	3:01
3.	"All Warm"	2:47
4.	"Being Your Walls"	3:44
5.	"My Town"	3:32
6.	"The Wanderers Guild"	4:13
7.	"Frost and Front Steps"	3:39
8.	"Phantoms Now"	4:24
9.	"Raindrops"	4:54
10.	"Kind of Perfect"	4:16
11.	"Slip Like Space"	3:50
Total length:		39:12

Japanese bonus track
No.	Title	Length
12.	"Pointless Forever"	4:42

== Personnel ==
Personnel per booklet.

Armor for Sleep

- Ben Jorgensen – vocals, guitar
- Anthony Dilonno – bass
- Nash Breen – drums
- P.J. DeCicco – guitar

Additional musicians

- Ariel Rechtshaid – synthesisers

Production

- Ariel Rechtshaid – producer, engineering, mixing
- Chris Fudurich – additional engineering, mixing
- Chris Knight – assistant
- Brian Gardner – mastering
- Pam Piffard – band photography
- Chris Strong – album photography, graphic construction
