= Stony Sleep =

English grunge rock band

Stony Sleep was an English teenage grunge rock band, formed in 1993 by brothers Ben Fox Smith (vocals, guitar), Shïan Smith-Pancorvo (drums, vocals), and William Salmon (bass).

== History ==
They were signed to Big Cat Records in 1995 and recorded Music For Chameleons which was originally released in 1996. The band then replaced Will Salmon with Lee Citron and recorded A Slack Romance in 1997, released in 1999. They split up in 1999 following the demise of Big Cat Records and under pressure from drug addiction and lack of finance.

During the band's career Stony Sleep toured Britain extensively and played a handful of gigs in Europe and the US. Highlights of their career included a top 30 slot in the Australian albums chart, an exceptional review by Ozzy Osbourne for the NME, and an interview with Johnny Vaughan, live on the Big Breakfast. They recorded two successful sessions under John Peel, which are very hard to get hold of.

Frontman Ben Fox Smith went on to front Serafin who toured with the likes of Frank Black and is now on his ninth solo album. Drummer Shïan Smith-Pancorvo has played in various bands, most notably as the founding drummer of Razorlight, he made many albums fronting French Car and the Bulimic Wizards and joined Serafin with Ben Fox Smith. Shïan currently sings for punk-prog band Genre 18. Lee Citron died in November 2001.

== Discography ==
=== Albums ===
- Music for Chameleons Version 1 (1996)
- Music for Chameleons Version 2 (1997)
- A Slack Romance (1999)
- Stony Sleep B-sides (2019)

=== Singles ===
- "This Kitten is Clean" (1996)
- "Absurd" (1997)
- "This Kitten is Clean" (re-release) (1997)
- "She Had Me" (1997)
- "Midmay" (1998)
- "Lady Lazarus" (1998)
- "Khartoum" (1999)
