= What to Do When You Are Dead =

Studio album by Armor for Sleep
- Released: February 22, 2005
- Recorded: August–October 2004
- Studios: Water Music and The Machine Shop, Hoboken, New Jersey
- Genres: Emo; progressive rock; punk rock
- Length: 44:15
- Label: Equal Vision
- Producer: Machine

Armor for Sleep chronology
Dream to Make Believe (2003)	What to Do When You Are Dead (2005)	Smile for Them (2007)

Singles from What to Do When You Are Dead
- 1. "Car Underwater" Released: May 3, 2005

What to Do When You Are Dead is the second studio album by American rock band Armor for Sleep. Following the completion of two songs written from the perspective of being dead, vocalist/guitarist Ben Jorgensen created a whole story from this viewpoint. What to Do When You Are Dead is a concept album, with each song telling the story of the aftermath of the protagonist's suicide and his journey through the afterlife. Recording took place between August and October 2004 with producer Machine. A rough mix of "Car Underwater" was made available in November, followed by two US tours in February 2005. What to Do When You Are Dead was released on February 22 through independent label Equal Vision Records.

Following a couple of US tours in April and May 2005, "Car Underwater" was released as a radio single. The group performed on the Warped Tour, before touring across the US in September and November. Later in November, a music video was released for "The Truth About Heaven", followed by a UK tour in December. In early 2006, the group went on a three-month headlining US tour, before appearing on Warped Tour again. What to Do When You Are Dead received mixed-to-favourable reviews and went on to sell over 200,000 copies. It peaked at number 101 on the Billboard 200 and reached the top 10 on two other Billboard charts. To celebrate the album's 10th anniversary, the group played a series of shows in late 2015.

== Background and recording ==
In February 2003, Armor for Sleep signed to independent label Equal Vision Records who released the group's debut album Dream to Make Believe in June that year. According to AllMusic biographer James Christopher Monger, the release gave the group "a solid spot" in the developing emo pop genre. This resulted in the group performing alongside Taking Back Sunday, Piebald and Thursday, among others.

What to Do When You Are Dead was recorded between August and October 2004 at Water Music and The Machine Shop in Hoboken, New Jersey. Producer duties were handled by Machine. Frontman Ben Jorgensen recorded his rhythm part first, followed by drums, then guitarist PJ Decicco tracked his lead parts and additional rhythm parts, ending with the bass lines. Decicco said that Machine felt that the bass needed to be recorded last because it goes out of tune quicker "so he has more of a reference to kind of hear things if he has them with the guitars already".

According to Decicco several different guitars were used during the recording process: a Gibson Les Paul Custom for the main rhythm tracking, as well as a Fender Telecaster Thinline and a Fender Telecaster Deluxe. Bogner Ecstasy and Marshall JCM800 amplifiers were used for most of the rhythm sections, as well as an Orange amplifier occasionally for octave parts. Decicco used the Delay Modeler Line 6 and Big Muff effects units. Machine then engineered and mixed the recordings. Additional engineering was performed by Jacob Nyger. Will Quinnell mastered the album at Sterling Sound in New York City.

== Music and lyrics ==
After completing the first demos for the album, Jorgensen planned to rewrite the lyrics to be less death-centric. For a while, he was unable to write anything else but from the perspective of being dead. While at a bookstore, he came across guides written for ghosts. He saw it as epiphany, "pointing me in that direction [writing about death]." Around this time, Jorgensen was going through a break-up of his "first real relationship," combined with the two years of touring with the group "...It was a very transitional period, and all those emotions converged." He initially composed the songs before showing them to the rest of the band; writing the lyrics in isolation. He later pondered that he should've "asked for help but it was something I wanted to be from me completely". According to Decicco, every song on the album is in Drop D tuning, often incorporating a ninth chord, which gave a "super rich" sound. Monger classed the album's sound as emo and punk rock, while Jason Notte of the Colorado Springs Independent said it toyed with progressive rock. Alternative Press categorized the album's sound as "scene music" in addition to emo and punk.

What to Do When You Are Dead opens with "Car Underwater", where the narrator sings about crashing into a lake and entering the afterlife. With "The Truth About Heaven", the group were unsure how to go into the first verse until Jorgensen came up with a single-note line that both he and Decicco liked. The line was recorded as an overdub using a separate guitar. Decicco said the group wanted "Remember to Feel Real" to "just have it start and ... kick your ass". The pre-chorus riff was written by Jorgensen and Decicco while on tour. The bridge in "Stay on the Ground" features a flange effect, which was written by Decicco and played through a Line 6 Pedal. Jorgensen came up with a keyboard part, which he wrote a song around that became "A Quick Little Flight".

"The More You Talk the Less I Hear" started out under the name "Storm" because the group wanted to incorporate "something with a real-life feel of a storm in it", according to Decicco. He said Machine came up with the idea of making the song "seem like it got all lo-fi ... like you were listening to it from the inside of a car." The "heart" of "Basement Ghost Singing" was built around Jorgensen playing with a Line 6 pedal, according to Decicco. The track included a mixture of real drums as well as drum loops. The intro to "Walking at Night, Alone" uses a blend of acoustic and electric guitar. The idea for this came from Machine; it was originally only acoustic guitar until he wanted Decicco to play the part on electric guitar as well. Decicco said this was so that Machine could treat it as a bass.

== Concept and booklet ==
AXS writer Terrance Pryor considers What to Do When You Are Dead a concept album centered around the protagonist's death and his subsequent journey in the afterlife. Some observers have noted the character going through the Kübler-Ross 5-stage model of grief management. Jorgensen grew up in a "very scientific environment." He was influenced by British writer Craig Hamilton-Parker. The album's title comes from a Hamilton-Parker book. Jorgensen explained that since he was in the process of writing a record in that manner, upon seeing the book, he thought it would be interesting making a record out of it. Jorgensen later remarked that placing himself in that perspective helped him approach a number of situations he would have been afraid to tackle if he didn't pretend he was dead. The band were initially hesitant working on a concept album until they were persuaded by Jorgensen.

The album's artwork features a Six Feet Under-esque image of a person hovering above suburban houses. The booklet features images of a man in a suit flying around and passing through walls, which, according to LAS Magazine writer David Spain, helps to immerse the listener by connecting the music and lyrics into the record's concept. The booklet was created by Rob Dobi, with art direction from Jorgensen and Asterik Studio, which also designed the booklet. Dave Hill contributed photography. Spin writer Will Hermes noted the album booklet's Hipgnosis-styled layout as being "an important part" of the album. Jorgensen revealed that one of the reasons Armor for Sleep signed to Equal Vision was the label's inclination to satisfy the group's creative vision.

== Release ==
In October 2004, Armor for Sleep toured with the Academy Is... On November 3, 2004, What to Do When You Are Dead was announced for release in three months' time, and a rough mix of "Car Underwater" was made available for streaming through the band's PureVolume profile. In early February 2005, the band went on tour with Something Corporate, Straylight Run, and the Academy Is... Later in the month, the group toured with Recover, Say Anything, and Case Pagan. What to Do When You Are Dead was released through Equal Vision Records on February 22. Some copies of the album included a bonus DVD that contained live footage, a documentary on the creation of the album, as well as music videos for Dream to Make Believe songs "My Town" and "Dream to Make Believe". The iTunes edition of the album included "Very Invisible" as a bonus track. On March 18, a music video was released for "Car Underwater". In April, the group went on tour with The Starting Line, Mae, and Suicide Pack. Following this, the group went on tour in April and May with The All-American Rejects, and Hellogoodbye. "Car Underwater" was released as a radio single on May 3.

Armor for Sleep performed on the West Coast and Midwestern dates of the Warped Tour in June and July 2005 after Midtown cancelled their appearances. Following this, they toured with From Autumn to Ashes, Emanuel, and Biology in September. On October 18, "Very Invisible" was made available for streaming via the band's PureVolume account. In November, the band toured across the US with Matchbook Romance, Lovedrug and Gatsbys American Dream. A Comprehensive Guide to Touring, the band's first video album, was released during this; it documented the initial tours supporting the album. A music video for "The Truth About Heaven" was made available via MTVU on November 23. Directed by Alan Ferguson, it features a dead person "looking back on his loved ones," according to AbsolutePunk. The band then went on a tour of the UK in December with Chiodos. From late January to mid-March 2006, the group went on a headlining tour of the US, dubbed The Invisible Sideshow Tour, with support from Boys Night Out, Chiodos and Action Reaction. Following this, they appeared at The Bamboozle festival, and went on the Warped Tour. A music video for "Remember to Feel Real" was posted on YouTube on June 6, 2006. A remix of the track was included on the Snakes on a Plane soundtrack, released in August.

== Reception ==
Professional ratings
Review scores
Source	Rating
AllMusic	4/5 stars
The Boston Phoenix	2.5/5 stars
Drowned in Sound	5/10
LAS Magazine	7.5/10
Melodic	2.5/5 stars
Now	2/5
Ox-Fanzine	7/10
Stylus Magazine	D+
Yahoo! Music	Favorable

=== Critical response ===
Critical reception of What to Do When You Are Dead was varied. AllMusic reviewer John D. Luerssen wrote that the record "ups the punk/emo ante" with "fabulously" composed songs, as well as a yearning to tackle the "norms of a movement that has grown increasingly stale". He described Jorgensen as going "dark" and toying with "his inner Aaron Lewis", frontman for Staind. Luerssen described the band's choice of working with Machine as "a risk that paid off". Chart Attack called the album a "surprisingly meaty" second record, with the group's "dynamic double-guitar attack" benefiting from Machine's "prog-metal predilections". Chart Attack concluded with: "Songs about dead people have rarely sounded so damned full of life." Raziq Rauf of Drowned in Sound wrote that the record had two "great" songs which could "fill the unashamed emo cynic with hope, only to be let down" by the remainder of the album. He went on to say that a "slight redemption" could be made with the album's title, but aside from that, there was "nothing else to say that you've not read before". LAS Magazine writer David Spain called the album an "interesting notch along the battered branch of emo's legacy," with the band giving its contemporaries "food for thought". Spain noted that the group didn't simply intend on making "another 40-minute schmaltz fest; they vested thought and idea into their work". Spain concluded that the band "succeed[ed] in creating a surprisingly original work in a drowning genre".

Ian M. Sands of The Boston Phoenix wrote that the majority of it comes across as the "well-worn hand-me-downs of a previous owner; all the same, it’s refreshing to hear an emo band breaking out of the formulaic". Melodic reviewer Andrew Ellis felt little had changed since the group's debut album, aside from the "more edgy guitars ... the songs [don't] grab me at all". While mentioning "Basement Ghost Singing" and "Car Underwater", Ellis said the "great tunes are too few" to make him give the album a higher rating. Laura McKee of musicOMH considered the "brutal" sincerity of Jorgenen's lyrics a highlight, while mentioning that although the music might be generic, the group managed to make their mark in the "otherwise overcrowded industry" in terms of lyrics. Uthayashanker compared Jorgensen to Brand New frontman Jesse Lacey and was convinced she was listening to Brand New during "Stay on the Ground" and "Walking at Night, Alone". She said the group had created an album that "won't surprise but will certainly entertain". According to Now writer Jered Stuffco, Equal Vision was "banking heavily" on the band to accumulate strong sales, and based on the group's "poster-boy image, melodramatic harmonies and tight emo riffage," he felt they might succeed.

=== Commercial performance and legacy ===
What to Do When You Are Dead peaked at number 101 on the Billboard 200, as well as charting at number 1 on the Heatseekers Albums chart and number 8 on the Independent Albums chart. By December 2007, the album had sold 220,000 copies.

To celebrate the 10th anniversary of What to Do When You Are Dead, the band performed a series of shows in September, October and December 2015, during which they performed the album in its entirety. In 2015, Maria Sherman of Fuse.tv wrote that the album set the blueprint for "future pop-punk bands to explore concept records in very real ways". Calling it "impressive at the time, this band from the suburbs [wrote] a power pop-punk record with a linear, intricate narrative". AXS contributor Tarynn Law wrote that "the instantly relateable tracks that filled What To Do When You Are Dead soundtracked the teenage angst of kids all around the country for years to come". Brian Aberback of NorthJersey.com noted that the album placed the band on the "indie-rock map and continues to resonate heavily with fans 10 years later". Jorgensen later called the album a "diary entry. Without that, I think a lot of people when [their] lives go on they forget what they went through at a certain point in time so for me that's the biggest markers for me to remember where I was at the point in my life." NJ.com included the album at number 46 on the best New Jersey albums from the 21st century. As It Is frontman Patty Walters cited it as the biggest influence on their album The Great Depression (2019).

The band will celebrate the 20th anniversary of the album with a tour in March and April of 2025.

== Track listing ==
All lyrics are written by Ben Jorgensen; all music is composed by Jorgensen & Armor for Sleep.

No.	Title	Length
0.	"One Last Regret" (pregap hidden track)	1:17
1.	"Car Underwater"	3:48
2.	"The Truth About Heaven"	3:30
3.	"Remember to Feel Real"	3:21
4.	"Awkward Last Words"	3:46
5.	"Stay on the Ground"	4:30
6.	"A Quick Little Flight"	2:12
7.	"The More You Talk the Less I Hear"	4:04
8.	"Basement Ghost Singing"	4:36
9.	"Walking at Night, Alone"	4:14
10.	"I Have Been Right All Along"	3:46
11.	"The End of a Fraud"	5:11
Total length:		44:15

iTunes bonus track
No.	Title	Length
12.	"Very Invisible"	4:22

15th anniversary vinyl reissue bonus disc
No.	Title	Length
1.	"Who's Gonna Lie to You" (What to Do When You Are Dead b-side demo)	4:14
2.	"Always a Wish" (What to Do When You Are Dead b-side demo)	3:38
3.	"Curse into a Blessing" (What to Do When You Are Dead b-side demo)	4:09
4.	"Standing Alone" (What to Do When You Are Dead b-side demo)	3:48
5.	"Never Had the Chance" (What to Do When You Are Dead b-side demo)	4:36
6.	"Car Underwater" (What to Do When You Are Dead demo)	3:40
7.	"The Truth About Heaven" (What to Do When You Are Dead demo)	3:29
8.	"Stay on the Ground" (What to Do When You Are Dead demo)	4:30
9.	"Dream to Make-Believe" (Dream to Make Believe demo)	3:28
10.	"All Warm" (Dream to Make Believe demo)	2:52
11.	"Slip Like Space" (Dream to Make Believe demo)	3:46

== Personnel ==
Personnel per booklet.

Armor for Sleep

- Ben Jorgensen – lead vocals, rhythm guitar, piano
- Anthony Dilonno – bass guitar, backing vocals
- PJ Decicco – lead guitar
- Nash Breen – drums

Production and design

- Machine – producer, engineer, mixing
- Jacob Nyger – additional engineering
- Will Quinnell – mastering
- Ben Jorgensen – art direction
- Asterik Studio – art direction, design
- Rob Dobi – booklet
- Dave Hill – photography

== Charts ==
Chart performance for What to Do When You Are Dead
Chart (2005)	Peak position
US Billboard 200	101
US Billboard Heatseekers Albums	1
US Billboard Independent Albums	8
