= Serafin (band) =

British rock band

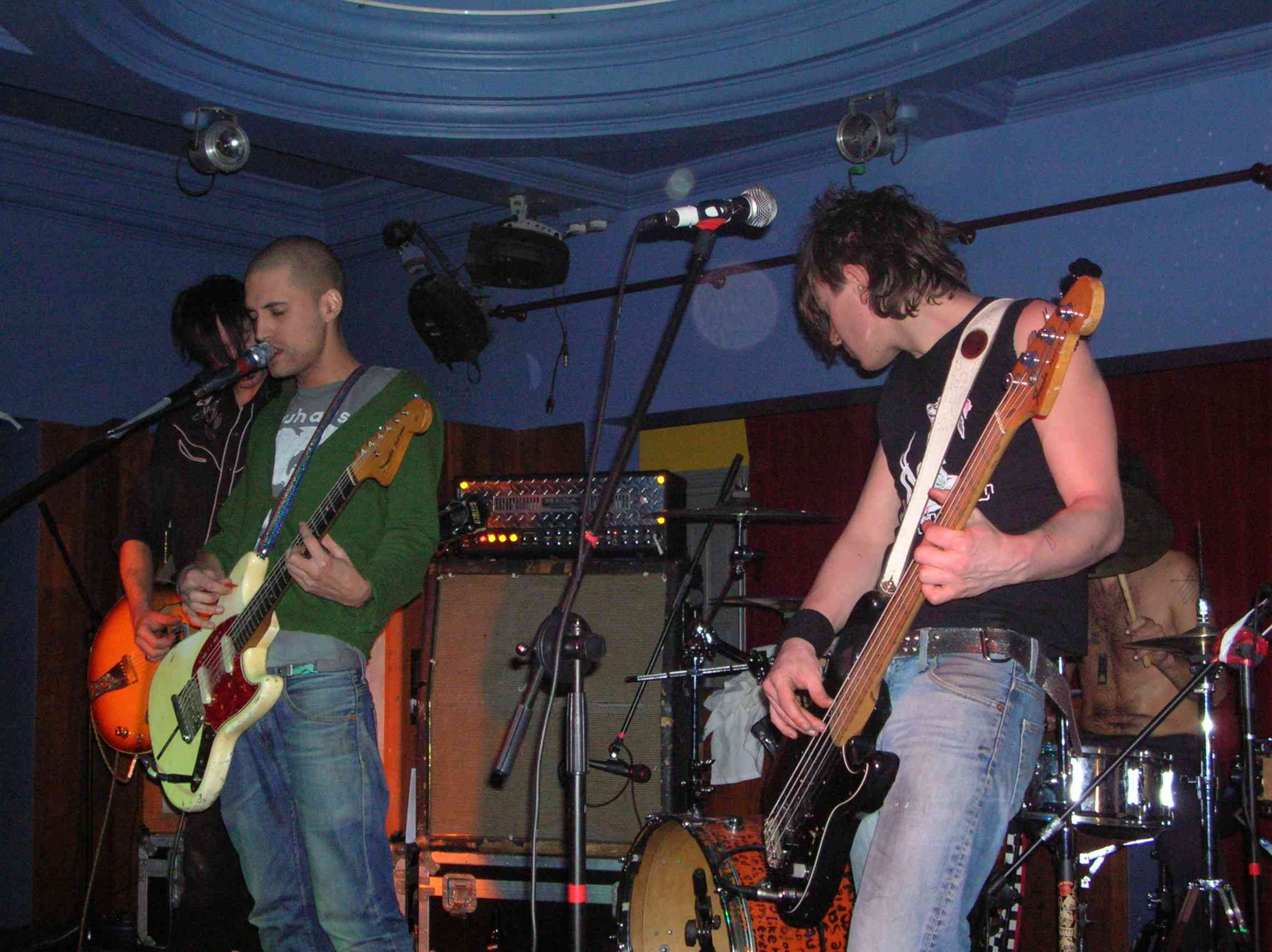
- Serafin performing in 2005

Background information
- Genres: Alternative rock, hard rock, post-grunge
- Years active: 2000–2008
- Label: Taste Media
- Members: Ben Fox Smith; Shian Smith-Pancorvo; Darryn Harkness; Johanna Hoppe
- Past members: Ben Ellis; Ronny Growler; Mike Clark; Daniel Green; Stuart Quinnel; Richie Mills
- Website: serafin.co.uk

Serafin were an English rock band from London who formed and began playing in September 2000 until quietly disbanding in the late 2000s after the release of their second album.

== History ==
The original band line-up did not play live but the two members who have stayed throughout are Ben Fox Smith, and Darryn Harkness. The band itself was formed after the demise of Stony Sleep when Ben met Darryn at a Eurovision Song Contest party in Highbury, London. Darryn played on some John Peel Sessions before forming Serafin. They added Johnny Borrell (bass) and then Stuart Quinnell with Richie Mills (drums) from Cable. These line-ups were short lived (a few months) and their first gig had Ronny Growler on drums and Mike Clark on bass.

Stuart Quinnell appears to be the bass tech for Frankie Poullain from The Darkness and plays in the road crew band Onion Trump.

Mike Clark left to go back to Canada in 2002 and is now working on Ben Smith's acoustic-electronic solo project Young Sawbones. He was replaced by Ben Ellis who had been playing for Catherine Wheel who had decided to call it a day. It was this line-up on their debut album No Push Collide.

On 26 August 2004 Serafin posted this note on their website: "We have replaced our drummer Ronny Growler with a guy called Lonely Blue boy. We love Ronny who is a fantastic drummer in his own right, but have had to realise our musical differences and preferences which, while considering the chemistry of the band and its future, became too great to continue with." Not too soon later did they announce that they had returned to the studio for their second album.

The new drummer was Ben's brother Shian Smith-Pancorvo who had left Razorlight in March 2004.

Famous fans include Simon Pegg of Spaced and Craig Nicholls of The Vines.

On 23 October 2007, Serafin announced their new bassist: Daniel Green 24 from Reading band Radios in Motion who replaces Ben Ellis.

== Releases ==
Although the band has been around for a few years, only two full albums have been released, No Push Collide (2003) on Taste Media, and To The Teeth (2007) on Our Rekords. They were produced by Dave Sardy in Los Angeles. and Ian Caple in London.

Two singles were released before the album, Things Fall Apart and Day by Day.

Serafin have released two four track EPs, also on Taste Media before No Push Collide. The first was in April 2002, the second in August 2002.

Taste Media was bought by Warner Music Group in 2004 which forced the band into legal limbo with no way to get out of their contract and no funding to promote To The Teeth. The management was fired and all four members spent more time on side projects (New Telepathics, French Car And The Bulimic Wizards, Young Sawbones and Triggerbox).

At the start of May 2005, Ben began releasing acoustic MP3s on their site, culminating in 21 ideas for songs free for download. The recording quality varies due to the nature of four-track recordings. They now have rough mixes of non-acoustic tracks on their Myspace page.

The Second album, 'To The Teeth', was released in December 2007, under their new record label 'Our Rekords'.

In 2020, a rarities compilation titled 0110110 was issued as a digital only release. In 2024, a b-sides compilation titled Serafin B-Sides was released.

== Discography ==
=== Albums ===
No Push Collide; CD; Taste Media (18 August 2003)	1. Stephen's In The Sky; 2. Day By Day; 3. Things Fall Apart; 4. No Happy; 5. Numerical; 6. Lethargy; 7. Ordinarily Me; 8. Build High, Tear Low; 9. Sage Waits; 10. Green Disaster Twice; 11. Peaches From Spain; 12. Who Could I Be?
To The Teeth; CD; Our Rekords (24 December 2007)	1. To The Lost and Found; 2. News; 3. Lady; 4. Key; 5. Arms; 6. Snake; 7. Scars; 8. Lord; 9. Religion; 10. Bones; 11. Question; 12. To The World
0110110; Streaming (20 December 2020)	1. There's A Bridge; 2. What You Running Away From; 3. Without You; 4. White Galaxy; 5. Showdown; 6. You'd Be Right; 7. As You Wander Back; 8. Yelling Sky; 9. Eats The Oxygen; 10. Image; 11. No Happy; 12. Lethargy; 13. Talking Ezra Pound; 14. Who Could I Be – bootleg, Paris
Serafin B-sides; Streaming (31 May 2024)	1. Spanish Water; 2. Andy Warhol; 3. High; 4. Since I Broke My Heart; 5. Keep It Away; 6. Drug Dog Handler; 7. How To Think Of Always; 8. Countries For Breakfast; 9. Violently Hopefully; 10. One More Way

=== Singles ===
Things Fall Apart; 2CD + 7"; Taste Media (5 May 2003) #49 UK	CD1: 1. Things Fall Apart; 2. Andy Warhol; 3. Spanish Water; CD2: 1. Things Fall Apart; 2. Since I broke My Heart; 3. High; 7": 1. Things Fall Apart; 2. Since I broke My Heart
Day By Day; 2CD + 7"; Taste Media (4 August 2003) #49 UK	CD1: 1. Day By Day; 2. Countries For Breakfast; 3. How To Think Of Always; CD2: 1. Day By Day; 2. Drug Dog Handler; 3. Keep It Away; 7": 1. Day By Day; 2. Countries For Breakfast

=== EPs ===
EP1; CD; Taste Media (8 April 2002)	1. Day By Day; 2. Green Disaster Twice; 3. Violently Hopefully; 4. Cowboy Song
EP2; CD; Taste Media (19 August 2002)	1. One More Way; 2. No Happy; 3. Sage Waits; 4. Lethargy

=== Compilations ===
- X-Ray CD 05 - Build High, Tear Low (Track 8) X-Ray, June 2003
- All Areas Volume 41 - No Happy (Track 2) Visions Magazine, July 2003
- X-Rock #01 - Thing Fall Apart (Track 4) X-Rock, 2003
- Peoplesound: Special Edition 4 - Day By Day (Track 1) PeopleSound, 2003

== Appearances ==
They sold the most records in France on Naïve Records, 20,000 or so. They toured extensively playing the Reading and Leeds Festivals twice, once on the Carling Stage (2002) and once on the Radio 1 stage (2003). Played many festivals in other European countries and supported Frank Black, Muse and Feeder, on their tour in 2003 before the release of No Push Collide.

Their single Day By Day appeared on the Madden NFL 2004 video game.
