= Press to Meco =

English band

- Origin: Croydon/Crawley, England
- Genres: Alternative rock; progressive rock; post-hardcore; pop; mathcore; pop punk; metal
- Years active: 2009–2023
- Labels: Best Before; Marshall
- Past members: Luke Caley; Mitch Mansfield; Doug Ryrie; Adam Roffey; Lewis Williams; Jake Crawford
- Website: presstomeco.com

Press to Meco (sometimes stylised as Press to MECO) was an English band hailing from Crawley and Croydon. The band was known for its fusing of intricate riffs, progressive sensibilities, math-influenced structures, pop choruses and three-part harmonies.

== History ==
=== 2009–2014: Career beginnings, early EPs and Download appearances ===
Press to Meco was formed in 2009 by Luke Caley (guitar/vocals), Mitch Mansfield (bass/vocals) and Doug Ryrie (drums/vocals). Their first gig took place in early 2009 at the final of the Crawley battle of the bands competition, having won the previous year under the name ADHD. The members would go on to change in 2011 with Lewis Williams taking over drums and Adam Roffey rounding out the lineup on bass. Throughout the next couple of years, the band took to the stage up and down the country, including joining Hopeless Heroic on portions of their 200-date tour in 2012 – a year which also saw the release of their self-titled EP, Press to Meco.

In May 2013, a few days after the release of their second EP, Affinity, the band announced that they would be playing the Red Bull Studios stage at Download Festival later that year as one of eight winners of a nationwide competition. The band was one of two wild card entries chosen by judges of the Red Bull-sponsored competition which saw over 700 unsigned bands vie for the chance to play the Donington music festival. 2014 picked up much of the momentum gained by the band in 2013 with continued touring, festival slots at Tech Fest and Red Fest – as well as being invited back to Download to play the larger Zippo Encore stage – and the writing and recording of their debut album.

=== 2015–2017: Debut album, growing profile and signing to Marshall Records ===
Beginning 2015 with a short headlining tour, Press to Meco continued the year with additional dates across the UK with supporting slots for the likes of Allusondrugs, Zoax and Funeral for a Friend, before festival appearances at Hevy Fest, Camden Rocks and Tech Fest. On 16 October 2015, the band released their debut album, Good Intent, through Best Before Records to a positive critical response. The album was funded through PledgeMusic with a percentage of contributions being donated to the Teenage Cancer Trust.

Continuing off the back of the success of their debut album, the three-piece began the following year on tour as part of the Scuzz UK Throwdown tour alongside Max Raptor and Allusondrugs before heading out on the road once more in support of Essex band InME across a six-date May tour. More festival appearances followed including slots at 2000trees, Camden Rocks and the Alternative Escape showcase as part of The Great Escape Festival in Brighton. In August, the band was nominated at the 2016 AIM Independent Music Awards for Independent Album of the Year alongside the likes of Radiohead, Skepta and Little Simz – the award eventually going to the Little Simz album, A Curious Tale of Trials + Persons. Having spent portions of the year writing their follow-up to Good Intent, the band flew out to Austin, Texas in September to record their sophomore effort with producer, Machine (Lamb of God, Four Year Strong) after a week of pre-production in Croydon.

In 2017, the band was featured in Kerrang! Magazine's Fresh Blood feature in January, while later in March undertaking a four-date tour playing Good Intent in its entirety. In July, the trio played the main stage at Amplified Festival later announcing their second album, Here's to the Fatigue, scheduled for release on 17 November 2017 alongside the release of the album's first single, "If All Your Parts Don't Make a Whole". The second single, title track "Here's to the Fatigue", followed in September but the album's release was put on hold as the band signed to Marshall Records, who would later release the album. The band toured in support of childhood heroes SikTh in December.

=== 2018–2020: Here's to the Fatigue and departure of Roffey ===
With their second album now scheduled for release on 30 March 2018, the band preceded its release with third single, "Familiar Ground", while in support of Don Broco on select dates of their February tour. Much like their debut album, Here's to the Fatigue received critical acclaim upon its eventual release, including a 4K review from Kerrang! magazine. That summer the band joined the festival circuit once more, playing slots at Teddy Rocks, Fat Lip Fest and playing both an electric and acoustic set at 2000trees.

Following the conclusion of their festival run, in August the band were revealed as the support for American band Shinedown on a 27-date UK and European tour from the end of October into the beginning of December. Encouraged by the reception they received from their acoustic set at 2000trees, the band released an acoustic EP, simply titled Acoustic, the following year on 15 February 2019. Including a rendition of "Strangers" by Sigrid, the EP also contained re-worked and re-imagined versions of songs from the band's previous two albums. In support of the release the band undertook a short acoustic tour. Festival dates followed the Acoustic EP tour with the band returning to Camden Rocks and Teddy Rocks while also playing Truck Festival, Behave Festival and Slam Dunk Festival. In between shows the band spent much of the year writing, releasing single, "Easy Life" on 19 September 2019. Two weeks following the release of their new single, the trio took to the road for a 16-date headline tour with Chapter and Verse as support.

The band began 2020 in the United States performing at the Marshall Amps booth at the NAMM show in Los Angeles, with further shows lined up later in the year including headlining the Neu stage at 2000trees. On 22 February the following month, the band announced the departure of Roffey. In July, having been cancelled due to the COVID-19 pandemic, the band played a remote set for the rebranded 2020 edition of 2000trees, 2000 Screens, later announcing the addition of new bassist, ACODA multi-instrumentalist, Jake Crawford. Unable to tour due to the continued effects of the coronavirus pandemic, the band resumed the writing of their follow up to Here's to the Fatigue, recording the new album in the latter half of the year.

=== 2021–2023: Third album, return to live shows and disbandment ===
After weeks of teasing new music, in February the band announced their third album, Transmute, set for release on 11 June 2021; sharing lead single, "Another Day" alongside the announcement. The second single, "Smouldering Sticks" followed a month later, but in April the band announced a delay to the album, rescheduling its release to 20 August 2021. Upon its eventual release, Transmute was met with positive critical response, including another 4K review from Kerrang! magazine, while also performing well commercially, peaking at number 26 on the UK Independent Albums chart and at number four on the UK Rock & Metal Albums chart. In October the band toured across the UK in support of Vukovi, marking their first live shows since the beginning of the COVID-19 pandemic. They later concluded the year by playing Reading Rising and 80 Trees, a combined event organised by 2000trees and ArcTanGent.

Beginning 2022 by playing The Black Prince in Northampton as part of Independent Venue Week, the band continued into the summer with festival slots at the likes of Portals festival and Radar festival in Guildford, while returning to Reading Rising and 2000trees in May and July respectively. On 9 December, the band released a statement announcing their break up. The statement read, "To everyone who's supported us and everyone who connected with our music, from the bottom of our hearts, thank you. It's been a wild ride and we're truly grateful to have been on such a journey with you all. We're still best friends. We're all still making music. It's just time to bring Press to MECO to an end." On Wednesday 5 July 2023, the band played their final show at 2000trees festival.

== Musical style and influences ==
Press to Meco have cited a variety of bands and artists as influences including SikTh, Billy Talent, Biffy Clyro, ABBA and the Beach Boys. Other acts said to inspire the trio are Reuben, The Dillinger Escape Plan, Michael Jackson, Deftones, Everything Everything and Manchester Orchestra. The band has also listed Steal This Album! by System of a Down, Ire Works by Dillinger Escape Plan, Graceland by Paul Simon, Mean Everything to Nothing by Manchester Orchestra, Good Apollo, I'm Burning Star IV, Volume One: From Fear Through the Eyes of Madness by Coheed and Cambria and Billy Talent's self-titled debut as albums that made a significant impact on them growing up.

As a consequence of these wide range of influences, the band's sound has regularly defied easy categorisation, often being branded under the broad umbrella of alternative rock, with elements of progressive rock, post hardcore, mathcore, pop punk, and metal having been identified within their music. This struggle to accurately describe their sound has not been lost on the trio, with the band once jokingly describing their music as, "Meshuggah banging One Direction with Reuben watching in the corner."

== Band members ==
Past members

- Luke Caley – guitar/vocals (2009–2023)
- Mitch Mansfield – bass/vocals (2009–2011)
- Doug Ryrie – drums/vocals (2009–2011)
- Adam Roffey – bass/vocals (2011–2020)
- Lewis Williams – drums/vocals (2011–2023)
- Jake Crawford – bass/vocals (2020–2023)

Timeline

== Discography ==
Albums

- Good Intent (2015)
- Here's to the Fatigue (2018)
- Transmute (2021)

EPs

- Press to Meco (2012)
- Affinity (2013)
- Acoustic (2019)
