= Something Supernatural =

Studio album by Crobot
- Released: October 28, 2014
- Genre: Hard rock, heavy metal, psychedelic rock
- Label: Wind-up

Crobot chronology
Crobot (2014)	Something Supernatural (2014)	Welcome to Fat City (2016)

Singles from Something Supernatural
- 1. "Nowhere to Hide" Released: July 29, 2014; 2. "Night of the Sacrifice" Released: October 7, 2014; 3. "Legend of the Spaceborne Killer" Released: March 2, 2015

Something Supernatural is the first studio album by American hard rock band, Crobot. The album was released via Wind-up Records on October 28, 2014.

== Track listing ==
Below is the track listing for the album:

No.	Title	Length
1.	"Legend of the Spaceborne Killer"	3:18
2.	"Nowhere to Hide"	3:03
3.	"The Necromancer"	3:18
4.	"La Mano de Lucifer"	5:35
5.	"Skull of Geronimo"	3:55
6.	"Cloud Spiller"	3:41
7.	"Fly on the Wall"	4:10
8.	"Night of the Sacrifice"	2:59
9.	"Chupacabra"	3:13
10.	"Wizards"	3:32
11.	"Queen of the Light"	5:09
12.	"Tap Dancin' on a Tightrope" (Bonus track)	3:30

Full Moon Howl Edition
No.	Title	Length
13.	"Full Moon Howl"	3:28
14.	"Back at the Blackwoods"	3:11
15.	"Weigh Me Down"	4:14
16.	"Upon a Pale Horse (Live)"	3:27

== Charting ==
Chart (2014)	Peak position
US Top Hard Rock Albums (Billboard)	18
US Heatseekers Albums (Billboard)	8
