= Armor for Sleep =

American rock band

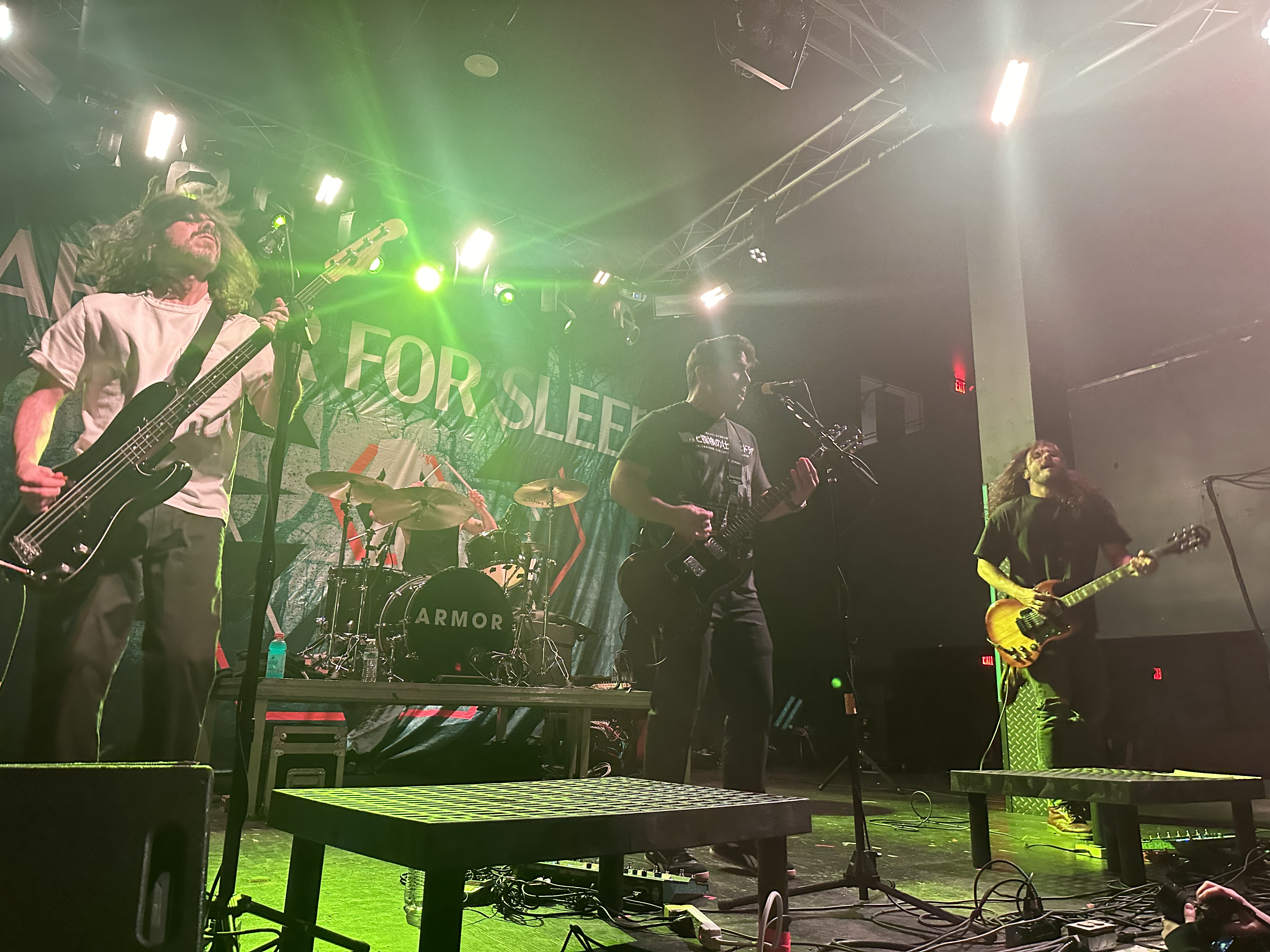
- Armor for Sleep performing in 2026

Background information
- Origin: Teaneck, New Jersey, U.S.
- Genres: Alternative rock; pop-punk; post-hardcore; emo; dream pop
- Years active: 2001–2009; 2012; 2015; 2020–present
- Labels: Sire; Equal Vision; Rude
- Members: Ben Jorgensen; Nash Breen; Erik Rudic; Chad Sabo
- Past members: AJ Resnick; Paul Abrahamian; Anthony DiIonno; PJ DeCicco
- Website: Official Facebook page

Armor for Sleep is an American rock band from Teaneck, New Jersey. Their original lineup consisted of vocalist, guitarist, and songwriter Ben Jorgensen, lead guitarist PJ DeCicco, bassist Anthony DiIonno and drummer Nash Breen. Currently, the band consists of Jorgensen and Breen alongside lead guitarist Erik Rudic and bassist Chad Sabo, both members of the Cold Seas, in which Breen is also a member.

After initial demos had been distributed, New York–based independent label Equal Vision Records signed the band and went on to release the concept-based albums, Dream to Make Believe (2003) and What to Do When You Are Dead (2005). The following year, the band signed to Sire Records and Warner Bros. and released their last album Smile for Them (2007) before a yearslong hiatus. The band announced their disbandment in October 2009, only reuniting briefly for tours in 2012 and 2015. They officially reunited in 2020 and have since released two more albums, The Rain Museum (2022) and There Is No Memory (2025).

During their recording career, the band has been known for their blend of alternative rock, atmospheric emo, and dream pop, as well as their "emotionally charged" lyrics.

== History ==
Armor For Sleep was founded by Ben Jorgensen in 2001 in Teaneck, New Jersey. Nash Breen and Peter James "PJ" DeCicco later joined the band after leaving fellow New Jersey band Prevent Falls. Jorgensen stated the name of the band comes from his early experiences of writing music and not being able to sleep. As he recalls, "I guess when I started the band I was kind of, like, retreating in my room and I kind of couldn't really fall asleep, so I started playing music. I just thought of the name Armor for Sleep, because it was really, the music was keeping me from passing out! Which was something I was procrastinating on."

Ben would go on to record a two-song demo containing the songs Dream to Make Believe and Slip Like Space, which would later be re-recorded and released on their first album Dream to Make Believe. Former guitarist Paul Abrahamian went on to form It's Called the Ghost Town Symphony in November 2002.

Armor For Sleep originally signed to Equal Vision Records, where they released their first two albums, Dream to Make Believe in 2003 and What to Do When You Are Dead in 2005. The band signed to Warner Brothers/Sire Records in 2006, explaining it was "time for a change".

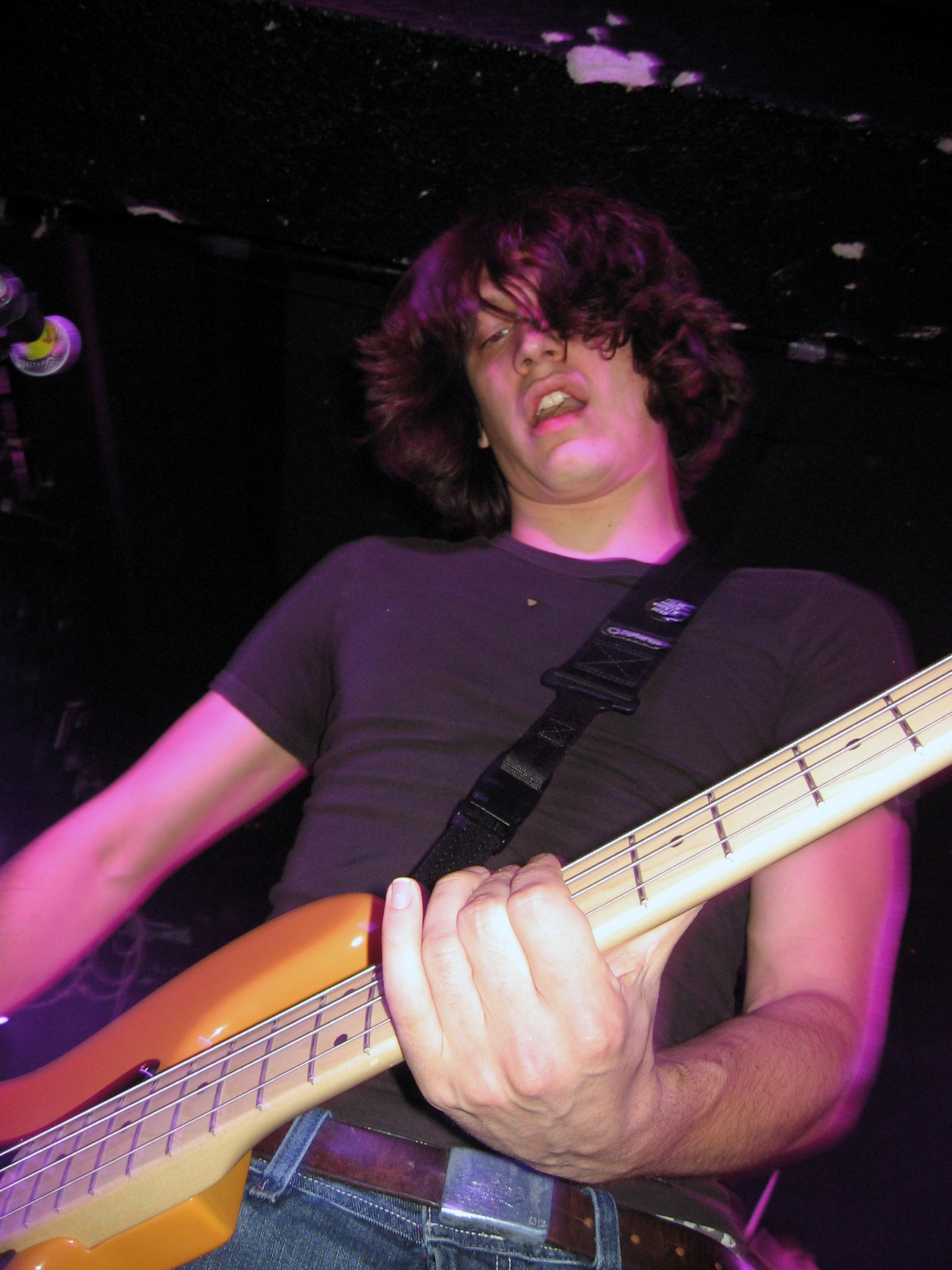
Bassist Anthony DiIonno in 2006

A Machine Shop remix of their track "Remember to Feel Real" was featured on the Snakes on a Plane soundtrack in August 2006.

The next year, the band debuted a new track entitled "End of the World" on the soundtrack for the 2007 film Transformers. The song appeared on their next record, but with various changes, including a reduction in vocal effects and keyboards.

Armor For Sleep released their third full-length album Smile for Them on October 30, 2007.

On August 20, 2008, the band announced an extended play (EP) entitled The Way Out Is Broken.

=== Disbandment and reunions ===
On October 28, 2009, it was officially announced that the band would be parting ways. Frontman Ben Jorgensen released a statement informing fans of the inevitable, after the band had been inactive, not undertaking a tour for over a year.

The band regrouped to play the 2012 Bamboozle Festival in New Jersey, releasing the following statement:

"We have no motivation for doing this other than to get up on stage and say goodbye properly to the people out there who never got the opportunity to see us one last time. Like Sam Beckett in Quantum Leap we will strive to "put right what once went wrong"...and then just like him we will poof out of existence. But for good this time- we promise."

On July 20, 2015, the band announced an eight city tour to celebrate the 10th anniversary of What To Do When You Are Dead.

=== Post-disbandment projects ===
In January 2009, Abrahamian formed the band 1984.

After the group parted ways, Ben Jorgensen briefly started an electronic project called God Loves a Challenge alongside Sierra Shardae and also embarked on a brief solo career, releasing the EP There Is Nowhere Left to Go in 2010.

In October 2014, Nash Breen formed the band the Cold Seas along with Erik Rudic, Chad Sabo, and Matt Castoral. Rudic and Sabo would later join Armor for Sleep in 2024 alongside Breen and Jorgensen; Breen, Rudic and Sabo are presently active in both bands.

=== Return and subsequent albums ===
On February 24, 2020, the band announced on Facebook that they would be reuniting for a summer tour including nineteen US cities to celebrate the 15th anniversary of What to Do When You Are Dead. The tour was later postponed due to the COVID-19 pandemic, and on August 13, 2020, the band announced the new tour dates for 2021. In July 2022, the band announced a new album, The Rain Museum, which was released on September 9, 2022 on Equal Vision Records and Rude Records.

In the summer of 2022, Armor for Sleep performed on select dates of the Hello Gone Days tour, co-headlined by Dashboard Confessional and Andrew McMahon in the Wilderness.

In the spring of 2023, the band co-headlined the Pitch Black Forever tour with Hawthorne Heights.

In the second half of 2023, the band went on tour to celebrate the 20th anniversary of their debut album, Dream to Make Believe, with guests the Early November and the Spill Canvas.

In February 2024 the band performed on the 2024 Emo's Not Dead Cruise, which was headlined by Yellowcard.

On July 18, 2024 the band released a new single, "In Another Dream". Then on October 11, 2024 they released another new single, "What a Beautiful World", along with a lyric video for the single.

On November 12, 2024 the band announced a 20th anniversary tour for What to Do When You Are Dead which began in Boston on March 6, 2025 and featured supporting acts Boys Night Out and Hellogoodbye.

On September 10, 2025, the band released the single "Breathe Again" and also announced their fifth studio album, There Is No Memory, which was released on November 7, 2025 through Equal Vision Records. The band went on tour in support of the album by opening for Senses Fail and Story of the Year on the Scream Team Tour, which began on November 17, 2025 at The Eastern in Atlanta, Georgia.

On October 10, 2025, the band released the fourth single from the album, "The Outer Ring". Then on November 8, they released the fifth single, "Last Days", along with an accompanying music video.

The band toured with Spanish Love Songs and Flycatcher in the summer of 2026.

== Band members ==
Current

- Ben Jorgensen – lead vocals, rhythm guitar, keyboards (2001–2009; 2012; 2015; 2020–present)
- Nash Breen – drums, percussion (2002–2009; 2012; 2015; 2020–present)
- Erik Rudic – lead guitar (2024–present)
- Chad Sabo – bass guitar, backing vocals (2024–present)

Former

- AJ Resnick – drums, percussion (2001–2002)
- Paul Abrahamian – lead guitar (2001–2002)
- Anthony DiIonno – bass guitar, backing vocals (2001–2009; 2012; 2015; 2020–2024)
- PJ DeCicco – lead guitar (2002–2009; 2012; 2015; 2020–2024)

Timeline

== Discography ==
Studio albums

- Dream to Make Believe (2003)
- What to Do When You Are Dead (2005)
- Smile for Them (2007)
- The Rain Museum (2022)
- There Is No Memory (2025)
