= Johnny Foreigner / Stagecoach =

Johnny Foreigner / Stagecoach Split

EP by Johnny Foreigner/Stagecoach
- Released: (United Kingdom) 15 November 2010
- Length: 13:12
- Label: Alcopop! Records

Johnny Foreigner chronology
Grace & the Bigger Picture (2010)	Johnny Foreigner / Stagecoach Split (2010)	Johnny Foreigner vs Everything (2011)

Stagecoach chronology
Crash My Ride (2010)	Johnny Foreigner/Stagecoach (2010)	Say Hi to the Band (2013)

Professional ratings
Review scores
Source	Rating
The 405	9/10 stars
Alter the Press	5/5 stars

Johnny Foreigner/Stagecoach is a split EP between Johnny Foreigner and Stagecoach. Released on November 15, 2010 through Alcopop! Records it features an original track from both bands as well as another track in which both bands perform a cover song of each other's songs and was limited to 500 copies.

== Track listing ==
No.	Title	Written by	Length
1.	"Tru Punx" (Johnny Foreigner)	Johnny Foreigner	3:14
2.	"Salt, Pepper & Spinderella (Turn On The Fake Drums)" (Stagecoach)	Johnny Foreigner	4:31
3.	"Not Even Giles Would Say We'll Be Ok!!!" (Stagecoach)	Stagecoach	2:20
4.	"Good Luck With Yr 45" (Johnny Foreigner)	Stagecoach	4:21
Total length:			13:12

== Personnel ==
Johnny Foreigner

- Alexei Berrow - vocals/guitar
- Kelly Southern - vocals/bass
- Junior Elvis Washington Laidley - drums/vocals

Stagecoach

- Luke Barham - vocals/guitar
- Nick Tanner - lead guitar
- John Harrington - bass guitar/vocals
- Tom 'Chop' Lewis - mandolin/vocals
- Matt Emery - drums/vocals
