= Johnny Foreigner =

British indie rock band

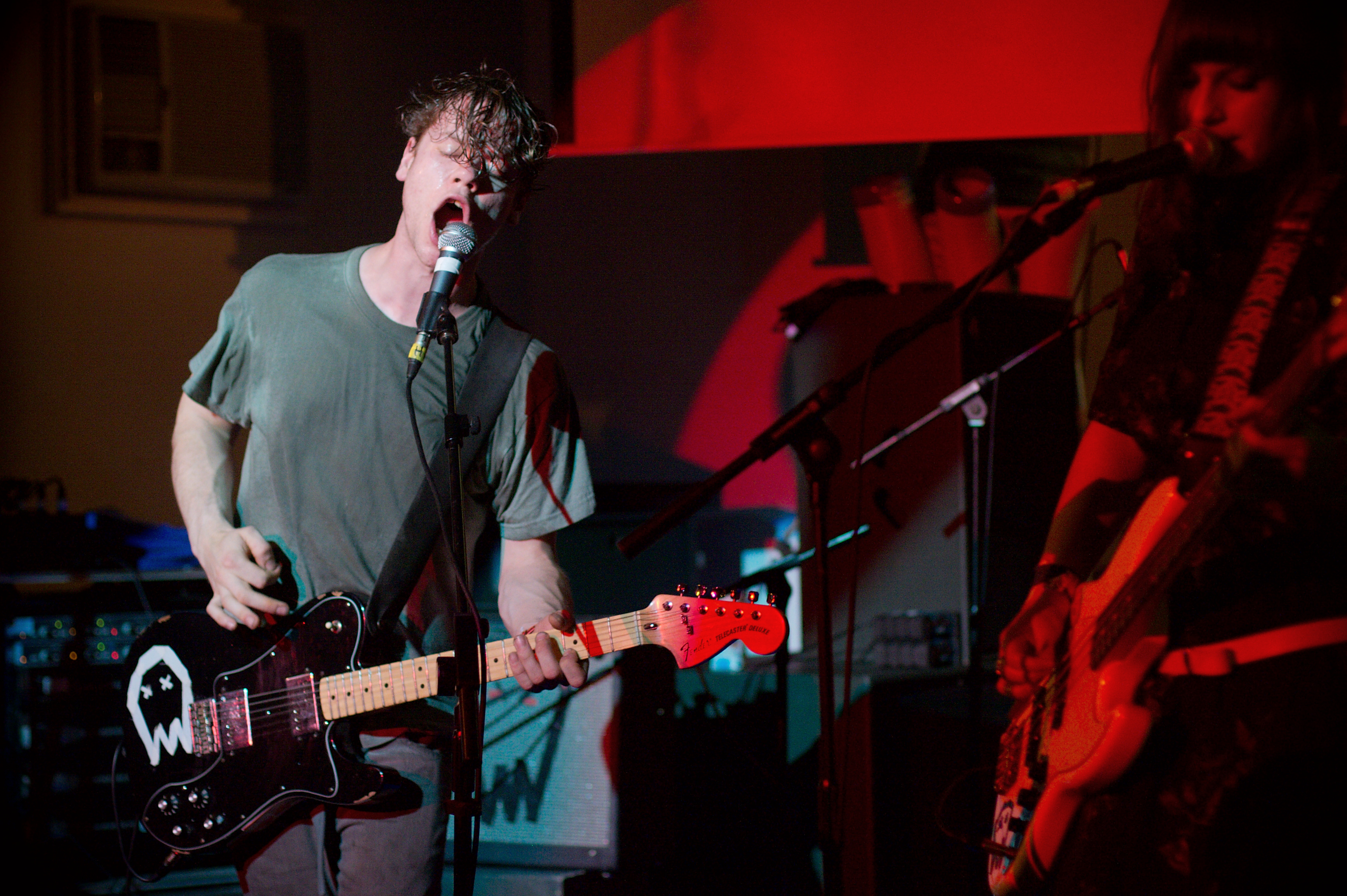
- Alexei Berrow and Kelly Parker of Johnny Foreigner at Great Escape Festival 2008

Background information
- Origin: Birmingham, UK
- Genres: Indie rock, punk rock, noise pop, math rock
- Years active: 2005–2016, 2021–present
- Labels: Alcopop!, Best Before, Lame-O, Swerp, Nettwerk, Shore&Woods Recordings
- Members: Alexei Berrow; Kelly Parker; Junior Elvis Washington Laidley; Lewes Herriot
- Website: http://johnnyforeignertheband.com/

Johnny Foreigner are an indie rock four-piece from Birmingham, UK, consisting of guitarist and lead vocalist Alexei Berrow, bassist and vocalist Kelly Parker (née Southern), drummer Junior Elvis Washington Laidley, and guitarist and visual artist Lewes Herriot.

The band have released eight albums, beginning with a self-release in 2005 and their full-studio debut Waited Up 'til It Was Light in 2008. After releasing the record Mono No Aware in 2016, and touring it, the band entered a hiatus. The band announced new activities in July 2021, and in 2024 released two EPs, I Saved these Four Words till the End and The Sky and Sea were Part of Me (or I was Part of Them), followed in September that year by the full-length album How to Be Hopeful. They released Forwards! in September 2026.

== History ==
=== We Left You Sleeping and Gone Now and early works (2005–2006) ===
Johnny Foreigner formed in December 2005 in Birmingham, consisting of lead vocalist Alexei Berrow, drummer Junior Elvis Washington Laidley and bassist Daniel Boyle. Berrow described the band as "a country band with pretensions". This original line-up self-produced and released their first album We Left You Sleeping and Gone Now in 2005 in a hand-made edition of 40 copies.

After the release of the album, Boyle left Johnny Foreigner for Gentle Friendly, and was replaced with bassist and vocalist Kelly Parker (who had briefly played with Alexei in Panda Love Unit). The band released their first single, "Sometimes in the Bullring/Camp Kelly Calm" in October 2006.

The second single, released 21 May 2007, was a split with fellow Birmingham act Sunset Cinema Club and contained the track "Yes! You Talk Too Fast", as well as a cover of Sunset Cinema Club's "Ninki. vs Dingle", whilst Sunset Cinema Club covered Johnny Foreigner's "Candles".

=== Waited Up 'til it Was Light (2007–2008) ===
After signing to Best Before Records in 2007, the band issued the EP Arcs Across The City in November of that year. The EP was rated 10/10 by Drowned in Sound.

Later in 2007 Johnny Foreigner recorded their debut album Waited Up 'til It Was Light in Hoboken, New Jersey, during which they also gave their first live performance in the United States, supporting Delaware's Spinto Band and Cardiff-based indie pop band Los Campesinos! at the Bowery Ballroom in New York on 30 November 2007. Leading up to the release of the album, the band released the songs '"Our Bipolar Friends" and "Eyes Wide Terrified" from the album as singles on 10 March 2008 and 18 May 2008. The album itself was released on 2 June 2008. On 12 January 2009 "Lea Room" was released as a single as well.

In addition to the commercially available releases, Johnny Foreigner packaged 15 demos in July 2007 and made them available for free download under the title I Like You Mostly Late at Never.

=== Grace and the Bigger Picture (2009–2010) ===
In anticipation for their upcoming second studio album Johnny Foreigner would release the singles "Feels Like Summer" and "Criminals".

On 30 March 2009, while on tour supporting Hundred Reasons, Berrow announced that the band had finished recording their second album and it would be coming out later that year. Their second album Grace and the Bigger Picture was released through Best Before Records on 26 October.

On 10 September 2010, the band announced their departure from Best Before and arrival to Alcopop! Records. Their first release on Alcopop! was the EP You thought you saw a shooting star but yr eyes were blurred with tears and that lighthouse can be pretty deceiving with the sky so clear and sea so calm, which at one point was titled There When You Need It.

The band undertook their first North American tour in October 2010, supporting Los Campesinos! mostly along the eastern seaboard. To fund the tour, the band re-issued We Left You Sleeping and Gone Now (with ...also added to the title) and Everyday Is a Constant Battle with bonus tracks. They also released a bootleg of them supporting Los Campesinos! at the London Garage on 15 July 2010 filmed by Dan Gardner.

On 13 March 2011 the band's song "Absolute Balance", from their debut album, appeared on episode 10 of the Showtime series Shameless.

=== Johnny Foreigner vs Everything (2011–2012) ===
The EP Certain Songs Are Cursed was released on Alcopop! in April 2011 as a limited-edition CD attached to the underside of a frisbee. In September 2011, the single "(Don't) Show Us Your Fangs / The Hand That Slaps You Back" was released digitally with the option of stickers promoting the upcoming album.

Their 17-track third album Johnny Foreigner vs Everything was released on CD/MP3 on 7 November 2011. A double vinyl release was released on 16 July 2012, which features three additional songs from the Certain Songs are Cursed EP and two B-sides on the fourth side.

In late April 2012 as a prelude to the festival season, the band announced the addition of their visual artist Lewes Herriot as second guitarist.

=== You Can Do Better (2012–2014) ===
On 1 October 2012, the band announced the late October release of a new EP, Names, on Alcopop! in the UK and Chicago-based Swerp Records in the U.S. The EP was released as a digital download, with the Alcopop! version coming with a set of badges, and the Swerp version a T-shirt. An accompanying tour of the eastern and midwestern United States was also announced with Canadian dates to follow.

Johnny Foreigner released their fourth album, You Can Do Better, on 10 March 2014. This was followed by a 15-date UK tour, supported by Radstewart. The album received a score of 66 on Metacritic, indicating generally favorable reviews. The album was praised for its consistency, and the addition of Herriot as an additional guitarist was received well.

On 21 July 2014, Philadelphia label Lame-O Records announced that it had signed the band for the United States and that a mixtape of re-recorded B-sides and demos, Worse Things Happen at Sea, would be released online the following day. Lame-O released You Can Do Better in a vinyl pressing of 500 (100 clear, 400 cherry red) on 19 August 2014.

=== Mono No Aware and hiatus (2015–2022) ===
The band announced their fifth album on 13 June 2016, titled Mono No Aware. It was released on 8 July via Alcopop! Records and would feature the single "If You Can't Be Honest, Be Awesome". Following Mono No Aware, an EP entitled The X and the O would be released featuring two new songs, "The X and the O" from Mono No Aware, and a remake of "Palace Fires" from the "Criminals" single.

After some touring for Mono No Aware Johnny Foreigner would go on hiatus. During this period of time Alexei and Junior would form the band Yr Poetry under which the duo would release four self released eps and two Alcopop! singles followed later by the 2022 album Ruin Music.

In July 2021 following a five-year hiatus, Johnny Foreigner announced a one-off 15th anniversary show in London for 2 October, a vinyl reissue of Waited Up 'til It Was Light, and plans for new music.

=== Resumed activity, How to Be Hopeful and Forwards! (2022–present) ===
In early 2022 Johnny Foreigner would officially return to playing shows in England and would begin work on their upcoming album. Later in early 2024 it would be announced that the new Johnny Foreigner album was coming in Q3 of 2024.

To celebrate 10 years since the release of You Can Do Better Johnny Foreigner did a merch drop on their Bandcamp alongside releasing the EP I Saved these Four Words till the End which contained four lesser known live versions of tracks for You Can Do Better and the album's scrapped title track.

On 12 June 2024, Johnny Foreigner announced the new album's title was How to Be Hopeful and would be released via Alcopop! on 13 September. The announcement was accompanied by the release of an EP titled The Sky and Sea were Part of Me (or I was Part of Them), featuring two album tracks and a number of outtakes.

In July 2026, the band released "The New Navigation" as the lead single for their album Forwards!, which released on the 4th of September 2026. The band released another single from the album - "The Concrete Collar" - in August.

== Members ==
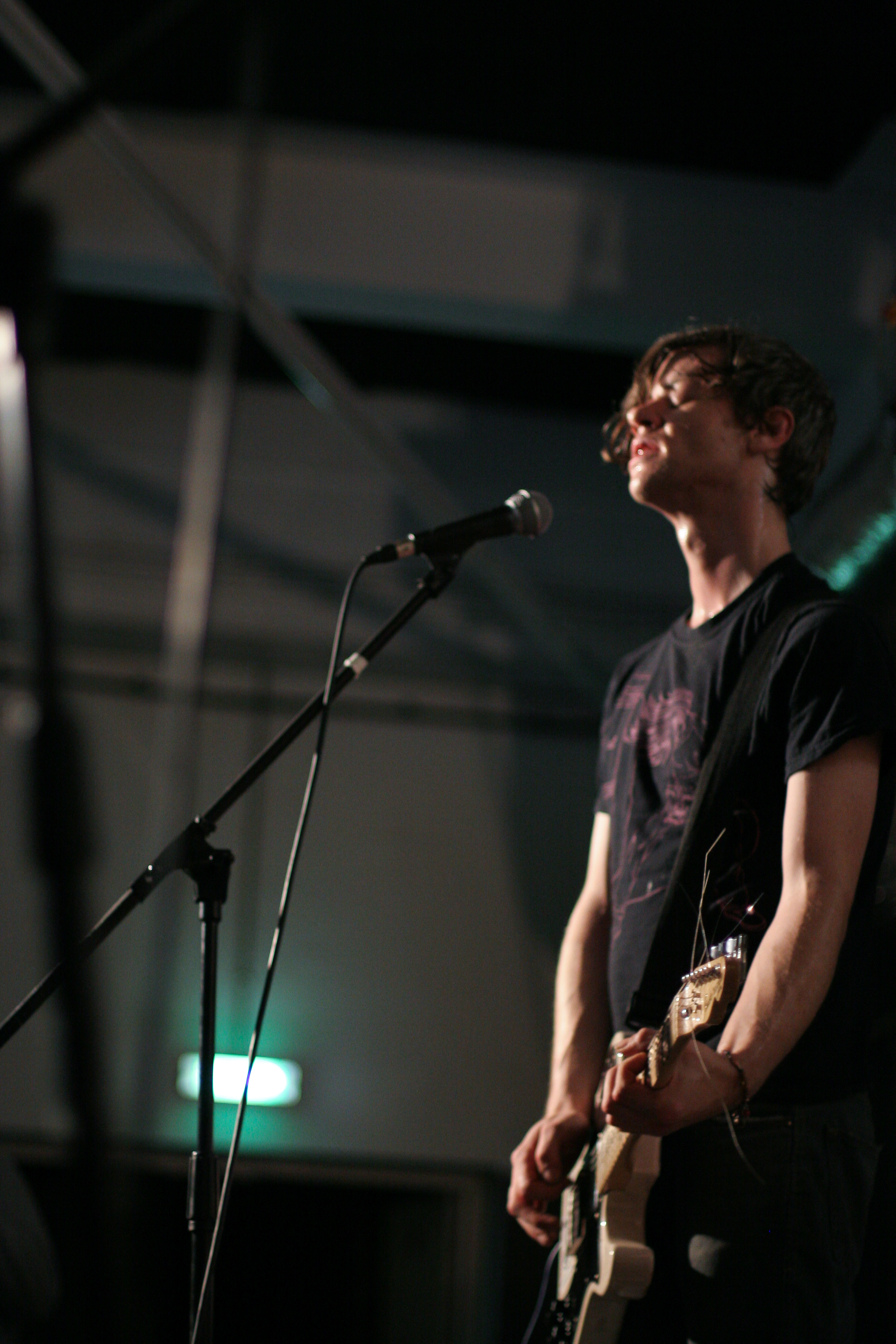
Alexei Berrow

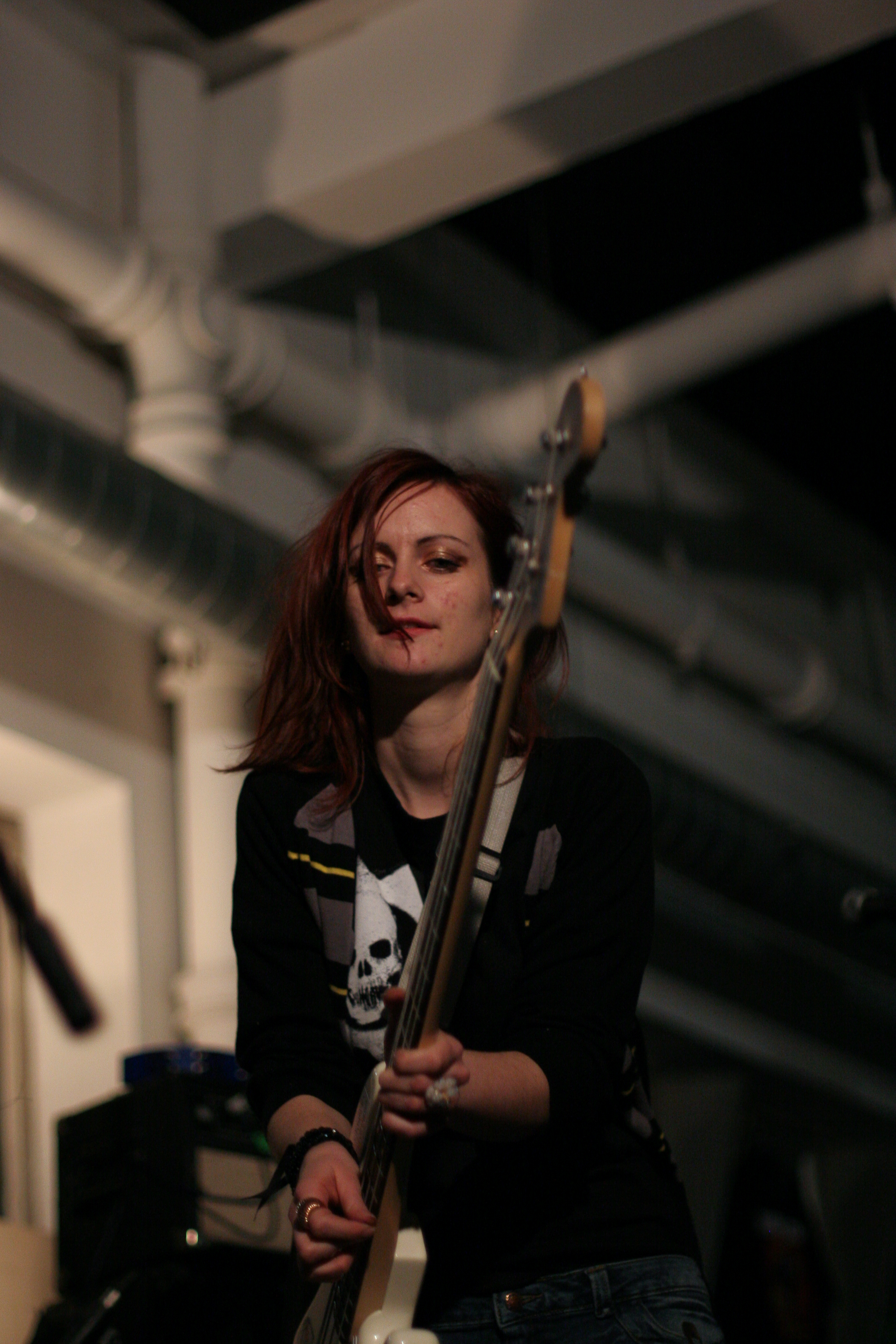
Kelly Parker

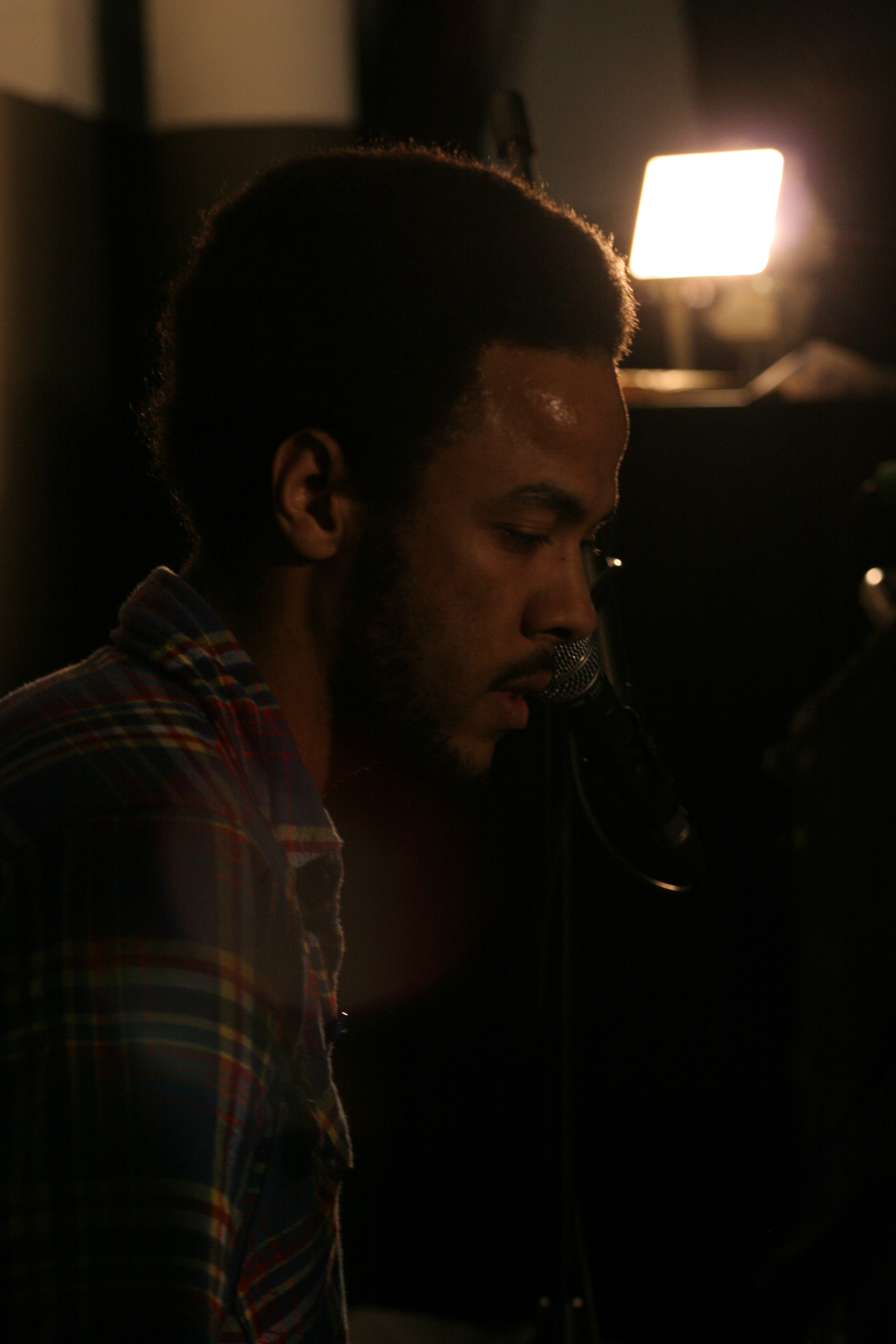
Junior Elvis Washington Laidley

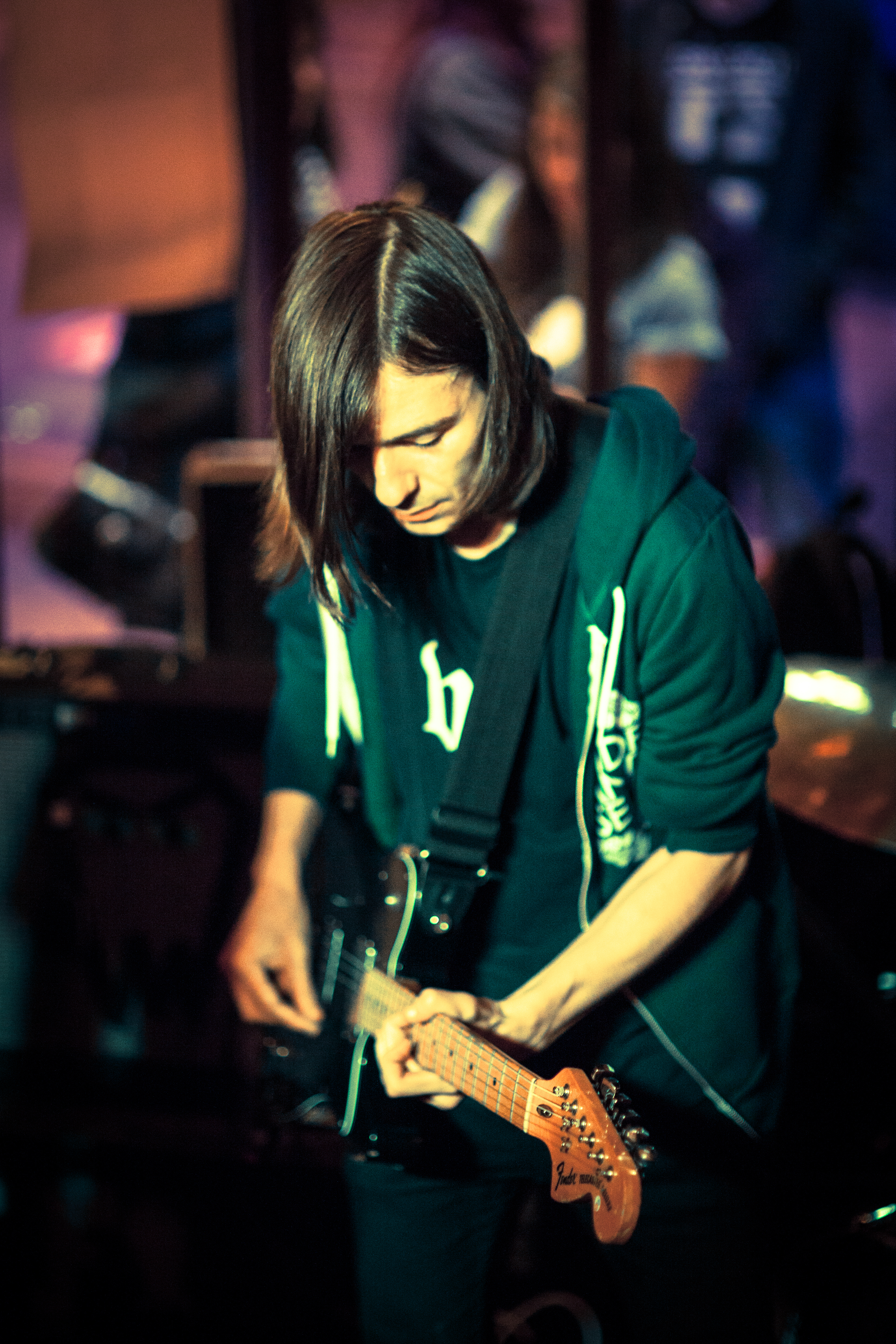
Lewes Herriot

Current

- Alexei Berrow – guitar, lead vocals (2005–present)
- Kelly Parker – bass, lead vocals (2006–present)
- Junior Elvis Washington Laidley – drums, backing vocals (2005–present)
- Lewes Herriot – guitar, backing vocals (2012–present)

Former

- Daniel Boyle – bass (2005–2006)

Timeline

== Discography ==
=== Albums ===
List of albums, with selected chart positions
| Title | Album details | Peak chart positions | | |
| Title | Album details | UK Sales | UK Indie | SCO |
|---|---|---|---|---|
| We Left You Sleeping And Gone Now | Released: December 2005; Label: Self-released; Formats: CD | — | — | — |
| Waited Up 'til It Was Light | Released: 2 June 2008; Label: Best Before, Nettwerk; Formats: CD, LP, digital download | 65 | 16 | 88 |
| Grace and the Bigger Picture | Released: 26 October 2009; Label: Best Before; Formats: CD, LP, digital download | — | 38 | — |
| Johnny Foreigner vs Everything | Released: 5 December 2011; Label: Alcopop!; Formats: CD, LP, digital download | — | — | — |
| You Can Do Better | Released: 10 March 2014; Label: Alcopop!, Lame-O, Vinyl Junkie; Formats: CD, LP, digital download, streaming | — (Note: You Can Do Better did not enter the UK Albums Chart, but peaked at number 21 on the UK Record Store Chart.) | — | — |
| Mono No Aware | Released: 22 June 2016; Label: Alcopop!, Lame-O, Vinyl Junkie; Formats: CD, LP, digital download, streaming | — | — | — |
| How to Be Hopeful | Released: 13 September 2024; Label: Alcopop!, Lame-O, Vinyl Junkie; Formats: CD, LP, digital download, streaming | — | — | — |
| Forwards! | Released: 4 September 2026; Label: Alcopop!, Shoreandwoods; Formats: CD, LP, digital download, streaming | — | — | — |
"—" denotes a recording that did not chart or was not released in that territory.

=== EPs ===
- Arcs Across the City - Best Before Records (2007)
- Feels Like Summer - Best Before Records (2009)
- Every Cloakroom Ever - Self Released (2010)
- Johnnyforeignerisaces (Hearts Edition) - Self Released (2010)
- You Thought You Saw a Shooting Star but Yr Eyes Were Blurred With Tears and That Lighthouse Can Be Pretty Deceiving With the Sky So Clear and Sea So Calm - Alcopop! Records (2010)
- There When You Need It (2010 non-album tracks) - Self Released (2011)
- Certain Songs are Cursed - Alcopop! Records (2011)
- You vs Everything - Alcopop! Records (2011)
- Names - Alcopop! Records/Swerp Records (2012)
- Manhattan Projects (alternate/acoustic versions) - Self Release (2013)
- The X and the O EP - Alcopop! Records (2016)
- I Saved these Four Words till the End - Self Released (2024)
- The Sky and Sea were Part of Me (or I was Part of Them) - Self Released (2024)

=== Singles ===
List of singles, with selected chart positions, showing year released and album name
| Title | Year | Peak chart positions | | | Album |
| Title | Year | UK Phys. | UK Indie | SCO | Album |
|---|---|---|---|---|---|
| "Sometimes in the Bullring / Camp Kelly Calm" | 2006 | — | — | — | Waited Up 'til It Was Light |
| "Our Bipolar Friends / The Houseparty Scene Is Killing You" | 2008 | 84 | 16 | — | Waited Up 'til It Was Light |
| "Eyes Wide Terrified" | 2008 | 83 | 14 | 97 | Waited Up 'til It Was Light |
| "Salt, Peppa and Spinderella" | 2008 | 65 | 4 | — | Waited Up 'til It Was Light |
| "Cranes and Cranes and Cranes and Cranes" | 2008 | — | — | — | Waited Up 'til It Was Light |
| "DJ's Get Doubts / Lea Room" | 2009 | — | — | — | Waited Up 'til It Was Light |
| "Feels Like Summer" | 2009 | — | — | — | Grace and the Bigger Picture |
| "Criminals" | 2009 | — | — | — | Grace and the Bigger Picture |
| "Every Cloakroom Ever" | 2010 | — | — | — | Grace and the Bigger Picture |
| "(Don't) Show Us Your Fangs / The Hand That Slaps You Back" | 2011 | — | — | — | Johnny Foreigner vs Everything |
| "Stop Talking About Ghosts" | 2014 | — | — | — | You Can Do Better |
| "If you Can't Be Honest, Be Awesome / A Good Man Is Hard to Find" | 2016 | — | — | — | Mono No Aware |
| "Flooding" | 2016 | — | — | — | Mono No Aware |
| "What The Alexei / Orc Damage" | 2024 | — | — | — | How to Be Hopeful |
| "Their Shining Path" | 2024 | — | — | — | How to Be Hopeful |
| "Jesus Christmas" | 2024 | — | — | — | Non-album single |
| "The New Navigation" | 2026 | — | — | — | Forwards! |
| "The Concrete Collar" | 2026 | — | — | — | Forwards! |
"—" denotes release did not chart.

=== Split ===
- Yes! You Talk Too Fast/Ninki vs. Dingle (split 7-inch w/Sunset Cinema Club) - Laundrette Recording Company (2007)
- Johnny Foreigner / Stagecoach (Split with Stagecoach) (2010)
- Alcopop! vs. Dog Knights Productions 4-Way Split - Johnny Foreigner (All Yr Favourite Bands Are Dead/Flooding), Doe, Doctrines, Playlounge

=== Demos/Bootlegs ===
- Everyday is a Constant Battle - Self Released (2006)
- I Like You Mostly Late at Never - Self Released (2007)
- Live at Wichiten - Self Released (2010)

=== Mixtapes ===
- Worse Things Happen at Sea - Lame-O Records (2014)

=== Compilations ===
European Disco - Collected B-sides, and Remixes, 2008 - 2010 - Self Released (2011)
