= Stagecoach (band) =

UK musical group

- Origin: London/Dorking, England
- Genres: Indie pop Indie rock Alternative rock
- Years active: 2003–2013
- Labels: Alcopop! Records, This Is Fake DIY
- Past members: Luke Barham; Nick Tanner; John Harrington; Tom 'Chop' Lewis; Matt Emery
- Website: Official website

Stagecoach was a British five-piece alternative rock band from Surrey, England, active from the late 1990s to the early 2000s. Known for their blend of indie rock, folk, and post-punk influences, the band gained recognition within the UK alternative music scene. Stagecoach developed a loyal following and are considered part of the UK's indie rock movement during that period

== History ==
Stagecoach formed in Dorking, Surrey, in November 2003. Initially starting as a two-piece country band, their sound evolved as they expanded to a five-piece rock band, incorporating a variety of influences, from indie rock to post-punk. Their first recordings were produced in Alex Miles' home studio in Dorking, where they crafted tracks like Small Town", "Cut Throat" and "Textbook Answers". The band recorded a self-funded EP at Iguana Studios in Brixton titled "School Day"; 1000 copies were pressed and distributed to record labels, press and sold at shows.

In 2009, Stagecoach signed to Alcopop! Records after sending the "We Got Tazers" EP to label boss Jack Clothier. The EP was recorded by Harvey Birrel, known for his work with Johnny Foreigner and Dananananaykroyd at Southern Studios in Wood Green.

The band's music began to gain broader recognition when they performed at major UK festivals, including, in 2010, the Reading and Leeds Festivals, and the End of the Road Festival (NME). In November 2010, they released the split single "Not Even Giles (Would Say We'll Be OK)" with Johnny Foreigner, which received positive reviews and helped further establish their presence in the indie rock scene. The band also earned airplay on national UK stations such as BBC Radio 1, BBC 6 Music, and XFM

Their single, "Not Even Giles (Would Say We'll Be OK)", a split 7-inch single with Johnny Foreigner, was released to a host of positive reviews in November 2010. Their songs have been played on UK national radio stations, including BBC Radio 1, BBC 6 Music and XFM.

"Crash My Ride" EP and single "Not Even Giles" and "Jonah Lomu" were recorded with producer James Kenosha.

In May 2013 Stagecoach released their first full-length album titled Say Hi to the Band. It was titled this by Luke Barham, he explains "after 10 years of writing together we finally have a full length record to present to the world. We wanted to introduce the band to new fans but also reacquaint with older friends. The title also reminds us of the warm friendly welcome of classic albums like Meet The Beatles and The Beach Boys Love You." The album was released on CD, 180g heavyweight vinyl, download and MiniDisc which was limited to only 20 copies and came as part of a bundle via Alcopop! Records. Say Hi to the band was produced by former Test Icicles member Rory Attwell who achieved recognition through a string of successful productions including The Vaccines, Veronica Falls, Yuck, and Male Bonding. The record was recorded in September 2012 at The Lightship 95 studio in Docklands.

The album was preceded by two singles. "Work! Work! Work!" was released as a screen printed poster (with download) designed by illustrator Nicholas Stevenson and limited to just 100 copies. The screen prints were made by Oxford collective, The Blessing Force. The second single from the album "Action" was released in a physical cassette format for Record Store Day 2013. Only 100 copies were made which were copied by the band themselves and came on 1970s Eagle reel-to-reel style tape stock.

The band announced their split on 12 September 2013. They played their final show to a sold-out crowd at The Brixton Windmill on 21 December 2013. Drummer Matt Emery continues to make music under his own name with an album produced by James Kenosha due in 2014. Singer Luke Barham also continues to write under the name 'Uncle Luc' An album produced by Henri Vaxby of French for Cartridge and Icons of Elegance is also expected in 2014.

== Video ==
The first Stagecoach video was directed by Terry Barham and edited by Andy Boyle. The video was shot at the band rehearsal space in Capel, Surrey which is a Quaker Hall by day.

This video was followed by 'Hang That Head' and also shot at the Quaker Hall and directed by Andy Boyle. It involves many T-shirt changes and is believed to hold a world record for most top swaps in a pop video.

Completing the trilogy of Capel shot video's was "We Got Tazers!" Directed by Andy Boyle it is a straight performance video.

The video for Stagecoach single "Map to the Freezer" features footage from the film Speed.

The video for Stagecoach single "Jonah Lomu" was directed by James Sharpe who has also directed video's for Frankie and the Heartstrings and Darren Hayman. The band came up with the concept which was to try to beat the world record time for eating a 12-inch pizza. The record is currently held by New Zealander Josh Anderson. The video was an exclusive to Nme.com.

The video for Stagecoach single "Work! Work! Work!" was directed by Michael James Hall and features 50 of the band's fans who replied to an advert asking "Can You Party As hard As This Man?" That man was label boss Jack Clothier who stars in the video.

The video for Stagecoach single "Action" was directed by former collaborator James Sharpe and stars Samatha White, Alan Pelz-Sharpe and Emma Hinds.

== TV and film usage ==
The band have had songs used on EastEnders, Blue Peter, Gavin & Stacey, Skins, and appeared on the trailer for the film Killing Bono. One of the band's recordings was also used on a promotional film for the UK Film Council.

== Radio ==
BBC Radio 1 presenter Huw Stephens named the band as one of his BBC Introducing highlights of 2010

The band were championed by local BBC Introducing DJ Phil Jackson who invited the band to record a live session at the Brighton-based studio in 2008. Stagecoach later recorded a Maida Vale Session for Huw Stephens in February 2011, which was broadcast on BBC Radio 1 in March the same year. In April 2013, Stagecoach recorded a session for XFM DJ John Kennedy, broadcast in May.

Stagecoach have been played on BBC Radio 1, BBC Radio 6 Music, XFM, Kerrang Radio, Q Radio, Amazing Radio and many regional stations.

== Discography ==
=== Albums ===
- Say Hi to the Band (Alcopop! Records, May 2013)

=== Extended plays (EPs) ===
- "Crash My Ride" (Alcopop! Records, July 2010)
  - "Hieroglyphics"
  - "Map to the Freezer"
  - "Axe Behind My Back"
  - "Good, Great, Better, Best!"
  - "Headbangers Ball"
  - "Fish Tank Glow"
- "The Holy Spirit" (Alcopop! Records, December 2009)
  - "Broke Piano"
  - "Overboard"
  - "Ice Age -Acoustic"
  - "C.U"
- "We Got Tazers!" (Alcopop! Records, October 2009)
  - "We Got Tazers!"
  - "Break"
  - "Hot Doggin'"
  - "Ice Age"
  - "Good Luck With Your 45"
- "School Day" (self released, May 2008)
  - "School Day"
  - "(Come Find Me in The) Library"
  - "Delinquents"
  - "Hang That Head"

=== Splits ===
- Johnny Foreigner / Stagecoach (Split with Johnny Foreigner) (2010)

=== Singles ===
- "Action" (Alcopop Records, April 2013)
- "Work! Work! Work!" (Alcopop Records, March 2013)
- "56k Dial-Up" (Alcopop! Records, April 2012)
- "Jonah Lomu" (This Is Fake DIY, March 2011)
- "Not Even Giles (Would Say We'll Be OK)" (Alcopop! Records, November 2010)
- "Map to the Freezer" (Alcopop! Records, July 2010)
- "We Got Tazers!" (Alcopop! Records, October 2009)

=== Compilations ===
- Bob Hope Would: "A compilation of exclusives and otherwise for the Japan Relief Effort" (Audio Antihero, March 2011)
- We Make Our Own Mythologies (Sweeping The Nation, April 2011)
- Second Time Lucky (Musical Mathematics, July 2011)
- Regal Vs. Steamboat for Rape Crisis (Audio Antihero, May 2013)
