= Selfhood =

Studio album by Sharks
- Released: 29 April 2013
- Recorded: November–December 2012
- Genre: Punk rock, alternative rock
- Length: 30:45
- Label: Rise, Velvet Scene
- Producer: Lewis Johns

Sharks chronology
No Gods (2012)	Selfhood (2013)

Selfhood is an album by British punk rock band Sharks, released in the UK on the 29 April 2013 and in the United States on 30 April 2013. The Japanese edition features five bonus tracks (four demos of album tracks and one cover, 'My Drug Buddy', originally by The Lemonheads).

In September 2012, Sharks began recording demos for a second studio album, which they hoped to finish writing by the end of the year. According to Mattock the band was "focusing on getting the best songs we can [..] out there as quickly as possible".

Recording for the new album, produced by Lewis Johns at the Ranch, Southampton, started on 26 November 2012 and was completed within two weeks.

According to James Mattock, "The whole approach with this record from the beginning was to have the process be very reckless and fun, and for every decision and idea not to be pondered on or over thought". He also said that he had written "most of the lyrics in a room above a morgue in [...] an old Victorian building with no heat, running water, or bathroom", and that these were "the most intimate and personal songs I've written - thus Selfhood is the most fitting title." Mattock has also explained that Billy Childish's literature had influenced his writing on Selfhood and that one of the songs, 'Pale', was about Childish.

== Reception ==
Professional ratings
Review scores
Source	Rating
Alternative Press	4/5 stars
Big Cheese	4/5 stars
Kerrang!	3/5 stars
Entertainment Focus	4/5 stars

Big Cheese magazine gave Selfhood 4/5 stars and declared it "a classic before its time and another winner", while Alternative Press magazine, which also gave Selfhood 4/5 stars, praised Sharks' "skill with their classic source material" and called the album "a time capsule for musical Anglophiles of the '70s and '80s - and a virtual primer for anyone who missed them." Kerrang! magazine, on the other hand, while still giving the album 3/5 stars, thought that Selfhood was "a slow burn affairs, rather than a petrol bomb through the window, but there's still fire here." Moreover, with this latest album Sharks had moved "squarely into indie-rock territory - more The Smiths than Strummer's gang [The Clash]".

== Track listing ==
All tracks are written by James Mattock and Andrew Bayliss, except where noted.

No.	Title	Length
1.	"Selfhood"	2:21
2.	"Your Bloody Wings"	2:37
3.	"Portland"	2:28
4.	"I Won't Taint"	3:15
5.	"The More You Ask Me, The Less I'm Sure"	3:14
6.	"Sunday's Hand"	2:13
7.	"22"	2:59
8.	"Pale"	3:04
9.	"Gold"	2:48
10.	"Room With A Grey View"	2:43
11.	"My Wild One"	3:53
Total length:		30:45

Bonus tracks on Japanese release
No.	Title	Length
12.	"Selfhood (demo)"	2:21
13.	"Portland (demo)"	2:30
14.	"Sunday's Hand (demo)"	2:44
15.	"My Wild One (demo)"	3:34
16.	"My Drug Buddy" (written by The Lemonheads)	3:02
Total length:		13:31

== Personnel ==
Band

- James Mattock – lead vocals, guitar
- Andrew Bayliss – guitar, backing vocals
- Samuel Lister – drums
- Carl Murrihy - bass

Production

- Lewis Johns
