= American Fangs =

Houston, Texas rock band

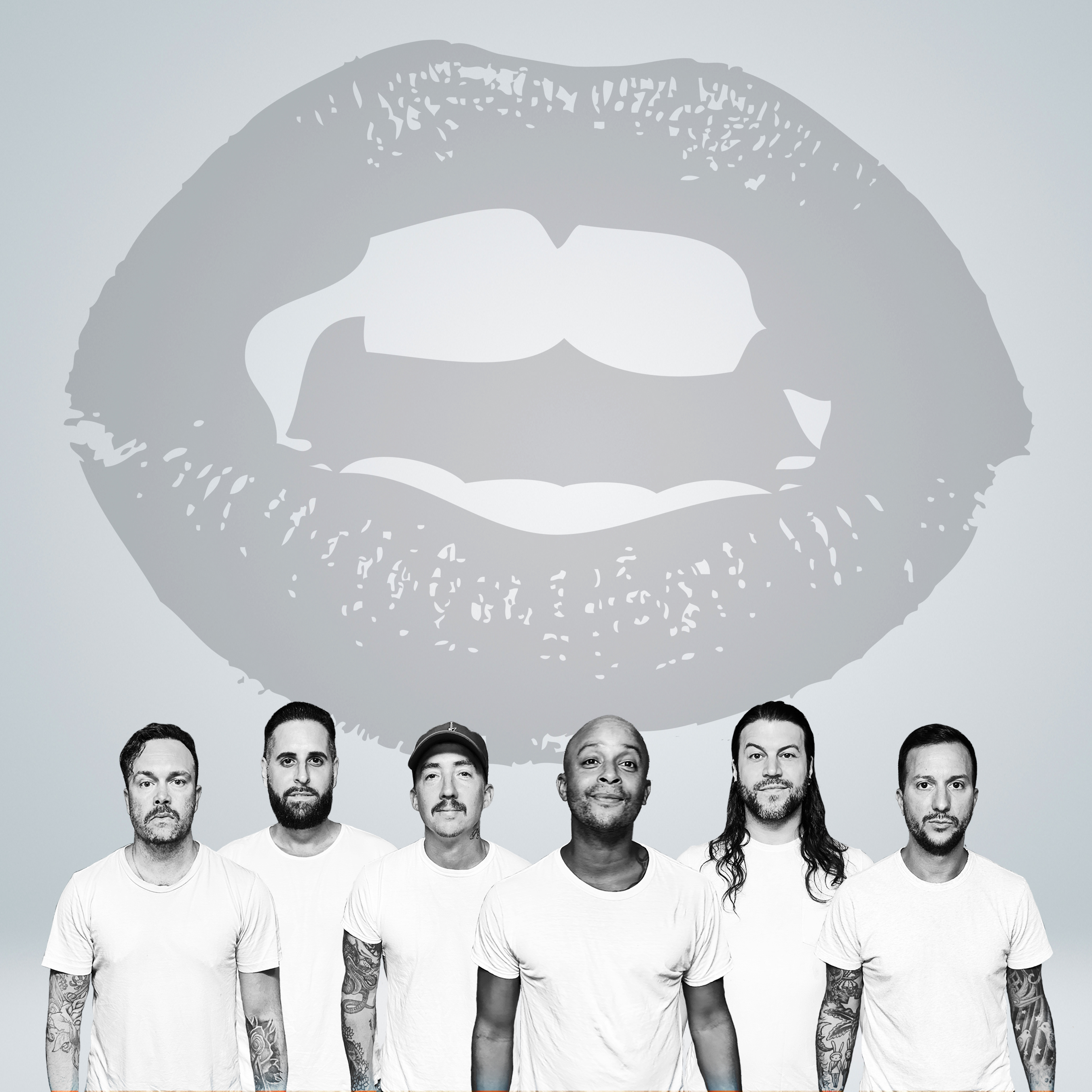

Background information
- Origin: Houston, Texas, U.S.
- Genres: Alternative rock, post-hardcore
- Years active: 2008–2016
- Labels: Indegoot Recordings; Best Before Records; Sony RED
- Members: Gabriel Cavazos; Micah Miller; Kyle Shimek; Kenyon Puntenney; Chris Goodwin
- Past members: Shelby Hohl; Jerry Nettles; Beau Gobert; Nik Slimp
- Website: www.americanfangs.net

American Fangs was a five-piece alternative rock band from Houston, Texas.

== Background ==
The Fangs' are a rock and roll outfit from Houston, TX. Their first album, American Fangs EP, was released in January 2009, followed by their self-titled LP in May 2013 via In De Goot. The band later produced an EP titled Pomona and the full-length album Dirty Legs, released in 2015 through Best Before Records with tracks produced by Machine, recorded and mixed in Austin Texas.

Their single "Pomona" spent over a month in top five on SiriusXM Octane radio chart, peaking at #2. The "Pomona" music video featured on VEVO possesses over 62,000 views.

American Fangs opened for Deftones, Papa Roach, Fall Out Boy, Hollywood Undead, Middle Class Rut, Sevendust, and others.

The festivals that the band have performed on include Download Festival, SXSW, Ship Rocked, Rock on the Range, Carolina Rebellion, Rocklahoma, Free Press Summer Fest, KFMA Fall Ball, Festapalooza Shreveport.

Rocksound listed them as one of 'The 9 New Bands You Need In Your Life Right Now'

The group made news when a man claiming to be a vampire assaulted a member of the band during a May 2013 performance at the La Crosse Center and drove a barricade through a window of the tour bus, according to police reports.

== Members ==
- Gabriel Cavazos - vocals
- Micah Miller - drums
- Kyle Shimek - bass, vocals
- Kenyon Puntenney - guitar, vocals
- Chris Goodwin - guitar, vocals

== Discography ==
- Dirty Legs (LP) (2015)
- Self-Titled (LP) (2013)
- Pomona (EP) (2013)
- Self-Titled (EP) (2009)
