= The Joys of Living 2008–2010 =

Compilation album by Sharks
- Released: 5 April 2011
- Recorded: September 2008–December 2010
- Genre: Punk rock, alternative rock
- Length: 45:21
- Label: Rise (126), Velvet Scene
- Producer: Max Read

Sharks chronology
Show of Hands (2010)	The Joys of Living 2008–2010 (2011)	No Gods (2012)

The Joys of Living 2008–2010 is a compilation album by the British rock band Sharks, released 5 April 2011. It compiles tracks recorded during the band's first two years, including their Shallow Waters EP (2008), "Common Grounds" single (2009), and Show of Hands EP (2010), along with the new tracks "Sweet Harness" and "The Joys of Living". It serves as a debut for the band in the United States, where their prior releases were available only as imports. The album was released through the band's imprint Velvet Scene, a joint venture with Rise Records. The band supported the album by touring the United States with Social Distortion and Chuck Ragan in April and May 2011, and by playing the 2011 Warped Tour.

== Reception ==
Professional ratings
Review scores
Source	Rating
AllMusic	3.5/5 stars
Alternative Press	4/5 stars
The Music	4.5/5 stars

Matt Collar of Allmusic remarked that the songs on The Joys of Living 2008–2010 were in keeping with working-class pub rock bands of the 1970s such as The Stranglers and Dr. Feelgood, and with oi! bands like the Angelic Upstarts. He also remarked that some of the tracks "evince a kind of spiritual unity with such equally working-class but uniquely American artists as The Replacements and Bruce Springsteen. In that sense, Sharks stand their ground well against such similarly inclined contemporaries as The Gaslight Anthem and The Hold Steady." Alternative Press magazine wrote that "[t]hese 14 songs bristle with a wonderful sense of rock 'n' roll heritage that serves as a tribute to fallen heroes such as the Clash while simultaneously molding those influences into something refreshing and contemporary."

== Track listing ==
All tracks are written by James Mattock and Andrew Bayliss, except where noted.

No.	Title	Length
1.	"Sweet Harness"	3:29
2.	"The Joys of Living"	3:31
3.	"Trains" (from Show of Hands, 2010)	2:29
4.	"It All Relates" (from Show of Hands, 2010)	3:10
5.	"Three Houses" (from Show of Hands, 2010)	3:30
6.	"More Blue" (from Show of Hands, 2010)	3:22
7.	"Glove in Hand" (from Show of Hands, 2010)	5:08
8.	"Capital Youth" (from "Common Grounds", 2009)	2:19
9.	"Common Grounds" (from "Common Grounds", 2009)	4:21
10.	"Yours to Fear" (from Shallow Waters, 2008)	2:23
11.	"Fallen on Deaf Ears" (from Shallow Waters, 2008)	2:51
12.	"It Threatens" (from Shallow Waters, 2008)	2:59
13.	"Bury Your Youth" (from Shallow Waters, 2008)	3:04
14.	"The Light at the End of the Tunnel Is Hell" (from Shallow Waters, 2008)	2:45
Total length:		45:21

Bonus tracks on Japanese release
No.	Title	Length
15.	"Museums" (from Sharks / Northern Towns, 2009)	2:26
16.	"Mirrors Within Mirrors" (from Sharks / Northern Towns, 2009)	2:52
17.	"Brassneck" (from Sharks / Northern Towns, 2009; written by David Gedge, originally performed by The Wedding Present)	4:10
Total length:		54:57

== Personnel ==
Band

- James Mattock – lead vocals, guitar
- Andrew Bayliss – guitar, backing vocals
- Samuel Lister – drums
- Cristian O'Reilly – bass guitar, backing vocals (tracks 1–9, 15–17)
- Adam Lovelock – bass guitar, backing vocals (tracks 10–14)

Additional vocalists

- Carl Murrihy – additional vocals on "The Joys of Living" and "It All Relates"
- Spencer Pollard – spoken word on "Glove in Hand"

Production

- Dan Weller – recording engineer, mix engineer, producer (tracks 1–9)
- Joe Willes – recording engineer
- Max Read – producer
