= Names (EP) =

EP by Johnny Foreigner
- Released: (United Kingdom) 1 November 2012
- Genre: Indie rock, post-punk, art rock
- Length: 9:24
- Label: Alcopop! Records, Swerp Records
- Producer: Dominique James

Johnny Foreigner chronology
Johnny Foreigner vs Everything (2011)	Names (2012)	You Can Do Better (2014)

Names, is a three-track EP by British indie rock band Johnny Foreigner. It is the first Johnny Foreigner record to feature Lewes Herriot. It was released on longtime home label Alcopop! Records except in the USA where it was released through Chicago-based record label Swerp Records in November 2012. The US version contains an alternative track-listing to Alcopop! release.

== Track listing ==
No.	Title	Length
1.	"Maybe Daniel's All The Push I Need"	2:25
2.	"Killing In The Name"	3:27
3.	"3 Hearts"	3:32
Total length:		9:24

Swerp Records version
No.	Title	Length
1.	"Maybe Daniel's All The Push I Need"	2:25
2.	"O When Will This Honeymoon End?"	3:27
3.	"3 Hearts"	3:32
Total length:		9:24

== Personnel ==
Johnny Foreigner

- Alexei Berrow - Vocals/Guitar
- Kelly Southern - Vocals/Bass
- Lewes Herriot - Guitar/Vocals
- Junior Elvis Washington Laidley - Drums/Vocals
