= No Gods =

Studio album by Sharks
- Released: 19 March 2012
- Recorded: September–October 2011
- Genre: Punk rock, alternative rock
- Length: 37:09
- Label: Rise (126), Velvet Scene
- Producer: Brian McTernan

Sharks chronology
The Joys of Living 2008–2010 (2011)	No Gods (2012)	Selfhood (2013)

No Gods is the debut full-length studio album by British rock band Sharks which was released by Rise Records on 19 March 2012 in the UK and on 20 March 2012 in the US. The album was recorded in Baltimore, MD, from September to early October 2011 and was produced by Brian McTernan. The band recorded a total of 14 tracks. Tony Corrales, formerly of The Exposed, having joined Sharks on a permanent basis, played bass on three songs (James Mattock played bass on all other tracks).

The album features 11 songs, while the Japanese edition additionally features three bonus tracks, all of which are cover songs.

"Arcane Effigies", the first single taken from No Gods, premiered on BBC Radio 1 on 3 January 2012. The video for 'Arcane Effigies' premiered on 14 February 2012.

The video for 'Patient Spider', the second single from No Gods, premiered on 18 June, while the single itself will be released on 2 July 2012.

== Reception ==
Professional ratings
Aggregate scores
Source	Rating
Metacritic	74/100
Review scores
Source	Rating
AbsolutePunk	8/10
AllMusic	2.5/5 stars
Big Cheese	4/5 stars
Classic Rock	7/10 stars
Kerrang!	4/5 stars
NME	8/10 stars
Q	4/5 stars
Rock Sound	8/10
Thrash Hits	2.5/6 stars

According to an early album review by Entertainment Focus, "over the course of eleven infectious anthems, Sharks sharpen timeless melodies with an explosive edge tempered by intricate riffing and hypnotic harmonies. It's pure, poetic, and powerful." Rock Sound magazine declared that No Gods "justifies the hype" and that "the album's glory is its masterful pop songwriting [...] with an anthemic joy that most American pop-punks can only dream of achieving." Q magazine called it "a starry-eyed celebration of yearning on a US factory floor, as idealised by British spa town punks."

== Track listing ==
All tracks are written by James Mattock and Andrew Bayliss, except where noted.

No.	Title	Length
1.	"'Til the Wonders Rise"	3:32
2.	"Arcane Effigies"	3:08
3.	"Able Moving Hearts"	3:42
4.	"On a Clear Day You Can See Yourself"	3:10
5.	"Matthew's Baby"	2:25
6.	"Patient Spider"	3:26
7.	"Turn to You"	3:37
8.	"Dawn Soft Light"	3:15
9.	"What Entails?"	2:59
10.	"Luck"	3:24
11.	"No Gods"	4:08
Total length:		37:09

Bonus tracks on Japanese release
No.	Title	Length
12.	"Life's a Gas" (written by The Ramones)	3:38
13.	"VCR" (written by The xx)	2:25
14.	"Motown Junk" (written by Manic Street Preachers)	3:50
Total length:		9:53

== Personnel ==
Band

- James Mattock – lead vocals, guitar, bass (except where noted)
- Andrew Bayliss – guitar, backing vocals
- Samuel Lister – drums
- Tony Corrales – bass (tracks 1, 5 & 9)

Additional performers

- Justin Carter – piano/organ (tracks 1–3 & 11)
- Tom Chiari – trumpet (track 6)
- Luke Schwartz – backing vocals (tracks 2 & 10)

Production

- Brian McTernan – producer (tracks 1–11)
- Joe Willes (tracks 13 & 14)
