= There Is a Way =

Studio album by Dananananaykroyd
- Released: 14 June 2011
- Recorded: November–December 2010
- Studios: Ross Robinson's home studio, Venice Beach
- Genres: Post-hardcore; alternative rock
- Length: 40:45
- Label: Pizza College
- Producer: Ross Robinson

Dananananaykroyd chronology
Hey Everyone! (2009)	There Is a Way (2011)

There Is a Way is the second and final full-length studio album by Dananananaykroyd and was released on 13 June 2011 through the band's own Pizza College label. It was recorded in Venice, California, United States with Ross Robinson over winter 2010.

The conceptual artwork was designed by Erik Hamline at Steady Print Shop Co. in Minneapolis, Minnesota.

== Recording ==
The album was recorded over November and December 2010 at Ross Robinson's home studio on Venice Beach. The small studio had previously been used by Klaxons and Korn and has a small 8' x 8' live room, where all the parts were played live to analogue tape. The band did 2 days of pre-production with Robinson where they rearranged 5 of the 11 songs that were to make up the album and before recording the group would spend hours talking over the song's meaning.

While cycling one morning, vocalist John Baillie Jnr found a busker playing saxophone and invited him to the studio to play on the album, he can be heard at the intro to E Numbers and the outro of Think and Feel. While the saxophonist was recording the band surrounded him, screamed and threw things at him to distract him because they felt he was playing too perfectly. A video of this can be seen on guitarist Duncan Robertson's Vimeo.

All guitars were recorded without re-amping. Any automation was performed live on old guitar pedals that were also used on Robinson's previous records such as At the Drive-In's Relationship of Command and The Blood Brothers's ...Burn, Piano Island, Burn.

Throughout the recording, one of the band's favourite films, American Movie, was played on a loop in the studio; it's been on a loop in Robinson's studio since 2003.

== Track listing ==
All tracks are written by David Roy and John Baillie Jnr, except where noted.

No.	Title	Writer(s)	Length
1.	"Reboot"		4:01
2.	"All Us Authors"	David Roy, Calum Gunn	2:41
3.	"E Numbers"	David Roy, Calum Gunn	4:14
4.	"Think and Feel"		3:47
5.	"Muscle Memory"	David Roy, Calum Gunn	3:19
6.	"Time Capsule"		4:43
7.	"Good Time"		3:15
8.	"Apostrophe"	Duncan Robertson, John Baillie Jnr	3:53
9.	"Seven Days Late"		3:30
10.	"Glee Cells Trade"		2:37
11.	"Make a Fist"		4:44
Total length:			40:45

== "Shrapnel! EP" ==
A collection of There is a Way leftovers were released as an exclusive bonus disk for HMV in the UK. They were recorded in Cava Studios in Glasgow in early 2011 over three days.

No.	Title	Length
1.	"Bodies Like Holes"	3:30
2.	"Wow"	3:15
3.	"Searchlight"	3:54
4.	"Song Six"	5:46
5.	"Cameo"	2:39
Total length:		19:04

== Personnel ==
Credits adapted from album liner notes.

Dananananaykroyd

- John Baillie Jnr and Calum Gunn - vocals
- David Roy and Duncan Robertson - guitars
- Ryan McGinness - bass guitar
- Paul Carlin - drums

Additional musicians and production

- Additional saxophone by Juan Del Rio
- Produced and mixed by Ross Robinson
