= ACODA =

British alternative metal band

- Origin: Corby, Northamptonshire, United Kingdom
- Genres: Rock, post-hardcore, alternative rock
- Years active: 2008–present
- Members: Damon Tang (2008–present); Stephen Crook (2008–present); Jake Crawford (2009–present); Jay Russell (2013–present)
- Past members: Wayne Parker (2008–2009); Dan Appleyard (2008–2010); Shaun Flynn (2008–2013)
- Website: ACODAUK.com

ACODA are a four-piece alternative rock band from Corby, Northamptonshire, United Kingdom. Formed in 2008, the band consists of vocalist/guitarist Damon Tang, bassist/vocalist Stephen Crook, guitarist/vocalist Jake Crawford and drummer/vocalist Jay Russell. The band are known for their energetic and emotive live shows and blending the musical influences of rock, metal, punk rock, progressive metal and post-hardcore.

They were named in the top 10 best unsigned UK bands by Kerrang! magazine in September 2011.

Their debut EP ACODA was released on 19 March 2012 and received commendations from Kerrang!, Rock Sound Magazine and Metal Hammer magazine. The release saw the band tour extensively, including appearances at Download Festival and Slam Dunk Festival.

On 12 August 2013, Acoda signed to Best Before Records and released their debut full-length album Yours to Defend on 28 October 2013. They have also gone on to release their 6-track EP, Round the Sun in May 2014. Their album 'TRUTH SEEKER' was released through Best Before Records on 30 March 2015 featuring singles "Whispers Like Roars", "Make It Up As You Go", "'Round The Sun" and "Won't Go Running".

== Biography ==
In 2009, Acoda recorded a home studio demo of six tracks. On the back of shows in mainland Europe, the band continued to tour the UK DIY circuit, whilst writing new music.

In 2010, the band teamed up with local music producer Justin Gleich to record the single "Finding Your Feet" and its B-side "Paint By Numbers" at Premier Studios, Corby. Acoda signed to Small Town Records for the single release.

In April 2011, Acoda entered the studio to record twelve tracks with producer Dan Lancaster. The drums were recorded at Middle Farm Studios, Devon and the remaining instrumentals at Studio Glasseye, Hertfordshire. The album was mastered by Alan Douches (Thrice, The Dillinger Escape Plan, Brand New, Misery Signals, Mastodon) at West West Side Music in New York.

In June 2011, the band played their first major festival performance at Download Festival on the Red Bull Bedroom Jam stage, followed by a gig on the River Thames on HMS Metal Hammer. The remainder of the summer saw performances at Sonisphere Festival, T in the Park, Hevy and Underage Festivals.

Acoda ended 2011 being named one of the Top 10 best unsigned bands in Britain by Kerrang! magazine.

On 19 March 2012, Acoda released the four track EP ACODA to critical acclaim from Kerrang!, Rock Sound and Metal Hammer magazines. The lead single "I Creep" received airplay on the Radio One Rock Show. The band supported the record with performances at Download Festival, Hevy Music Festival, Camden Crawl and Slam Dunk Festivals and played gigs in places such as London and Nottingham, amongst others. On 20 August 2012, the band released This Is Life and supported it with shows in England, Scotland and Wales.

In February 2013, the band returned to Studio GlassEye, Herts to record the 'Round The Sun EP with producer Dan Lancaster.

2013 saw the band continue to play gigs in places such as Birmingham, Southampton, Bristol and Sheffield, amongst others and support slots for bands like Funeral for a Friend.

On 27 June, Acoda released the track "The Future Is Yours to Defend" and announced that the debut full-length album Yours to Defend would be released through Best Before Records worldwide on 9 September 2013.

On 12 August 2013, Acoda signed to Best Before Records for the release of Yours to Defend and announced a new release date of 28 October 2013.

The band's second album "Truth Seeker" was self-produced and mixed/mastered by Jay Russell. Released through Best Before Records 4/2015 featuring the singles 'Whispers Like Roars', 'Make It Up As You Go', 'Won't Go Running' and 'Round The Sun'. The singles received radio play on Kerrang! and BBC Radio.

On 27 September 2019 ACODA released 'Ready Or Not' independently via Spotify and shows with the likes of Black Peaks (band) and Press To Meco followed. Recorded at Parlour Studios, Northamptonshire by Jay Russell.

== Discography ==
=== Albums and EPs ===
- 2009: Characters (EP)
- 2012: ACODA (EP)
- 2013: Yours to Defend Album
- 2014: Round the Sun (EP)
- 2015: "Truth Seeker" 2nd Album
- 2019: "Ready Or Not" Single
