= Death and the Penguin (band) =

British alternative band

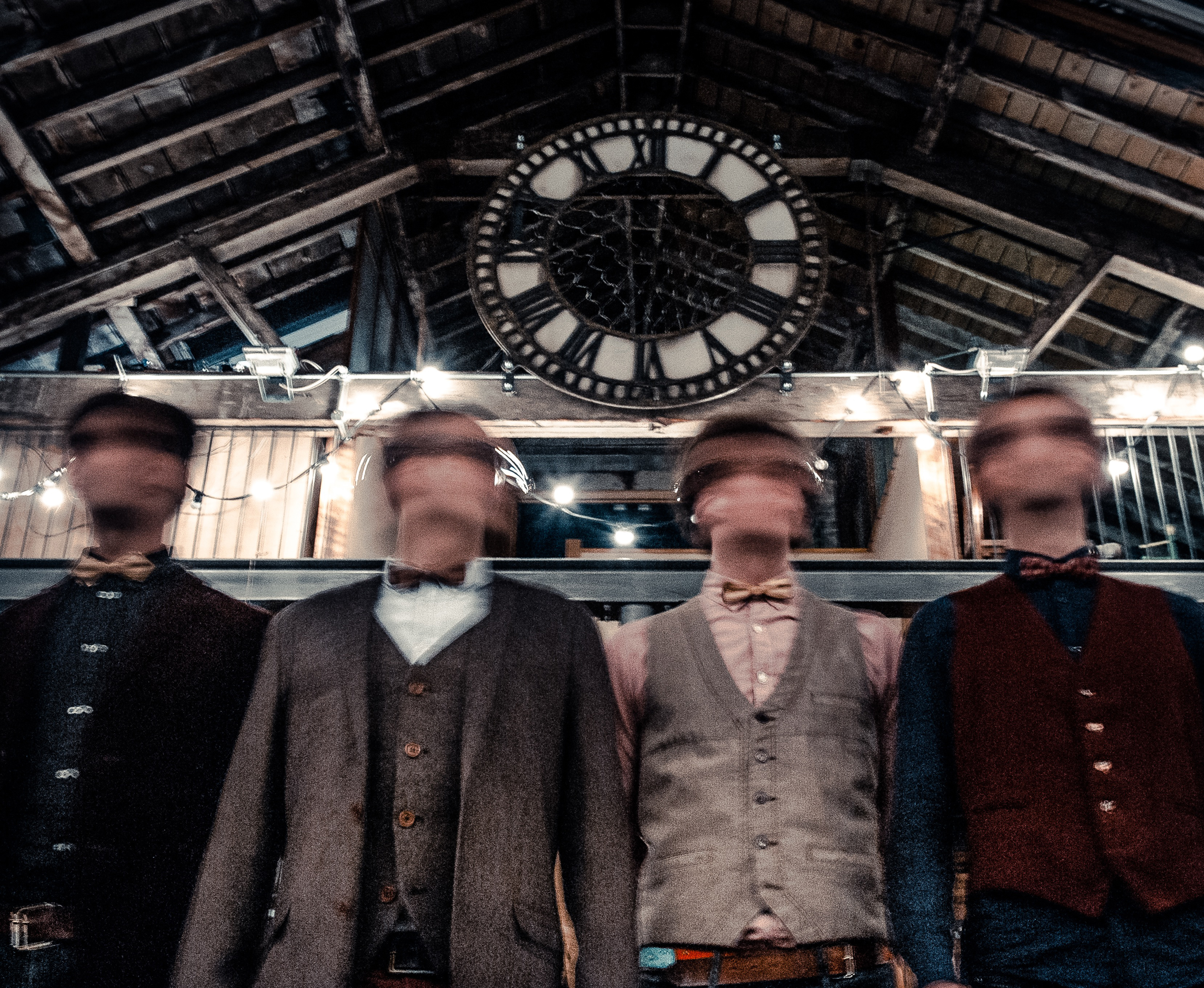
- Death and the Penguin

Background information
- Origin: London, England
- Genres: Rock, math rock, indie, alternative
- Years active: 2013–present
- Members: Toby Smith; Chris Olsen; Andy Acred; Phil Gadsden
- Website: Death and the Penguin

Death and the Penguin are an English four-piece alternative band from London.

The band consists of Toby Smith (vocals/guitar), Chris Olsen (guitar/keyboard/vocals), Andy Acred (bass/keyboard/vocals) and Phil Gadsden (drums). The band's musical style has been described as a combination of hardcore, indie and math rock, and has been compared to established acts such as The Mars Volta, Radiohead and Minus The Bear.

The band released their debut album "Anomie" on 27 July 2018, featuring the singles Kill Saatchi ("a perfect equilibrium between disjointed key signatures and catchy instrumentals" - The Line of Best Fit) and Colour In Me ("a devastating bout of avant rock that breaks down barriers into tiny little pieces" - Clash (magazine)).

== Discography ==
The band's debut EP 'Accidents Happen' was released on 9 June 2014 on Best Before Records and featured singles 'Strange Times' (aired on BBC Introducing, XFM and Amazing Radio and included in a compilation by the Big Scary Monsters Recording Company) and 'Snuffed Out' (featured on the Vevo HQ Alternative/ Indie Mix 2014).

Track name	Date	Duration
Snuffed Out	June, 2014	3:10
Space 1998	June, 2014	4:18
An Opening	June, 2014	1:51
Strange Times	June, 2014	2:27
Bitumen	June, 2014	3:24
The Words That Maketh Murder	June, 2014	4:08

The second EP 'Eine Kleine Granatenmusik' was self-released in November 2016 and included single "No Blood, No Sport", featured by Kerrang!.

Track name	Date	Duration
Eine Kleine Granatenmusic	November, 2016	2:24
The Border	November, 2016	2:40
We Are The Dead	November, 2016	5:07
No Blood, No Sport	November, 2016	4:00

The debut album 'Anomie' followed on 27 July 2018 to critical acclaim from the likes of Metal Injection ("Anomie is a triumphant record from start to finish" 8/10), Alt Dialogue ("This is an album that will thrill and relax, it’ll take you to highs and lows, but one thing is for sure – you’ll fall in love with Death & The Penguin" - 9/10) and Soundscape Magazine ("A bold release that breaks the mould" - 9/10).

Track name	Date	Duration
Hospital Song	July, 2018	2:14
The Calving Shuffle	July, 2018	3:55
Kill Saatchi	July, 2018	2:48
Space 1998	July, 2018	4:18
Colour In Me	July, 2018	3:53
Misha Lives	July, 2018	5:25
Driftwood (God Loves a Bird of Prey)	July, 2018	2:06
Strange Times	July, 2018	2:25
Abyssinia	July, 2018	3:58
Leatherface	July, 2018	4:51
Was It Kindness?	July, 2018	3:52
Bones	July, 2018	4:52

== Additional information ==
The band have toured extensively around the UK highlighted by performances at Wrong Festival and ArcTanGent Festival 2018.
