= Best Before Records =

British independent record label

- Founded: 2005
- Founder: Anthony Shaw
- Distributor(s): The Orchard (formerly with- PIAS)
- Genre: Alternative rock punk rock pop punk post-hardcore alternative metal
- Country of origin: UK
- Location: London, England
- Official website: Best Before Records

Best Before Records is a British boutique independent record label based in London, England.

Best Before Records's artists are generally considered Alternative, Pop Punk, alternative rock, but some also include elements of various genres of metal. Some of their most well-known artists include or included ACODA, Mutiny On The Bounty, 22, The Chapman Family, Sharks, Dananananaykroyd, Johnny Foreigner, The Pistolas, The Heights and in 2014 signing Death and the Penguin, American Fangs and Press to MECO.

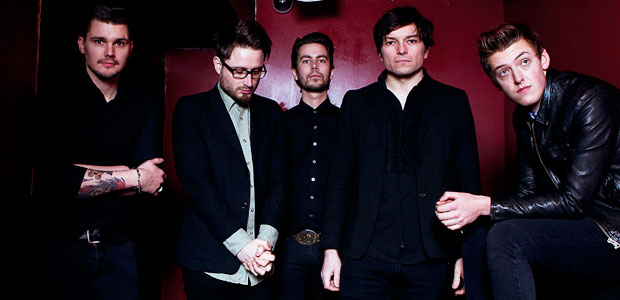
The Chapman Family

The label's functions include sourcing new artists, producing albums, marketing/promoting and securing international licensees in the North American, European, Australian and Asian markets. The company provides traditional record company services along with (for some) management, digital marketing/promotion, production and manufacturing services catered to each artists individual requirements.

== History ==
Best Before Records was launched in 2004 as part of a subsidy under the Channelfly and Mama Group corporate. In December 2009 Mama Group was acquired by HMV who had shown no interest in this part of the corporation therefore the label Best Before Records was taken over by label manager Anthony Shaw and became a fully independent label distributed by PIAS Entertainment Group in the UK and Europe.

After separating from its parent company, it continued to develop a strong label identity and effectively launching several new artist careers including ‘Dananananaykroyd’, ‘Johnny Foreigner’, 'The Heights' and ‘The Morning After Girls’. Taking on further bands like Sharks, 22, Mutiny On The Bounty, ACODA and most recently Death and the Penguin, American Fangs and Press to MECO.

In 2015, Best Before Records changed worldwide distribution to The Orchard and released several new albums.

== Artists ==
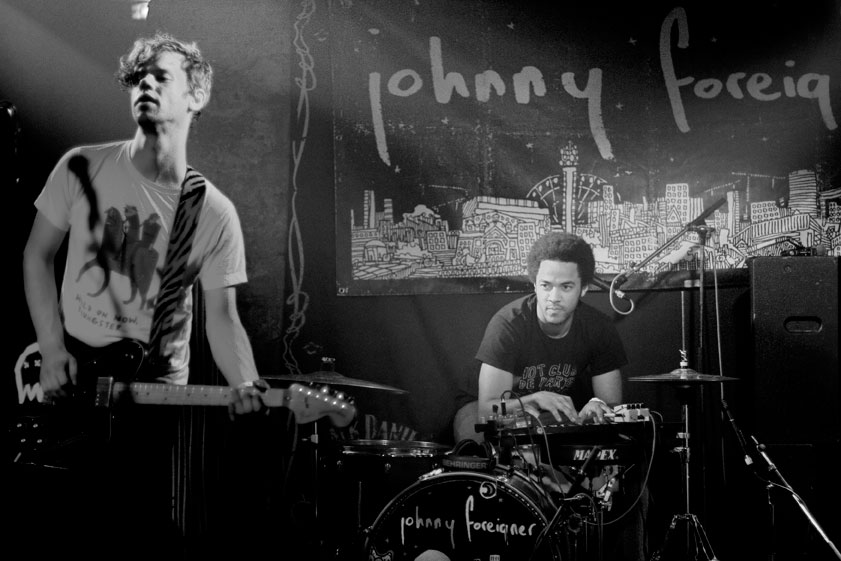

Artists that have been signed, or are currently signed, to the label

- (United Kingdom) Press to MECO
- (Norway) 22
- (United States) American Fangs
- (United Kingdom) ACODA.
- (Scotland) Dananananaykroyd
- (United Kingdom) Death and the Penguin
- (United Kingdom) Johnny Foreigner (active with Alcopop! Records UK)
- (Luxembourg) Mutiny On The Bounty
- (United Kingdom) Sharks
- (United Kingdom) The Chapman Family
- (United Kingdom) The Heights
- (Australia) The Morning After Girls
- (United Kingdom) The Pistolas

== Releases ==
Artist	Title	Year
The Morning After Girls	Shadows Evolve	2005
The Morning After Girls	Hi- Skies (Single)	2005
The Morning After Girls	The Morning After Girls	2005
The Heights	Long Way Home	2005
The Heights	Bad News E.P	2006
The Morning After Girls	The Run For Our Lives	2006
The Heights	Jamaica Beer Eyes	2006
Trailing Laces	Make Your Mind Up	2006
Johnny Foreigner	Arcs Across The City	2007
The Heights	For Real	2007
The Pistolas	Take It With A Kiss & Dinosaurs	2007
Johnny Foreigner	Waited Up 'Til It Was Light	2008
Johnny Foreigner	Salt, Pepper And Spinderella (Single)	2008
Dananananaykroyd	Pink Sabbath (Single)	2008
Dananananaykroyd	Sissy Hits (EP)	2008
Dananananaykroyd	Black Wax (Single)	2008
Dananananaykroyd	Some Dresses (Single)	2008
Johnny Foreigner	Our Bipolar Friends (Single)	2008
Johnny Foreigner	Eyes Wide Terrified (Single)	2008
Johnny Foreigner	Grace and the Bigger Picture	2009
Johnny Foreigner	Feels Like Summer (Single)	2009
Dananananaykrod	Hey Everyone!	2009
Johnny Foreigner	Criminals (Single)	2009
Sharks	Show Of Hands (EP)	2010
22	Plastik (EP)	2011
22	Kneel Estate (EP)	2011
The Chapman Family	Cruel Britannia (EP)	2012
22	Flux / The Pool Sessions (Double Album/DVD)	2012
Mutiny On The Bounty	Trials	2012
ACODA	Yours To Defend	2013
ACODA	Round The Sun (EP)	2014
Death and the Penguin	Accidents Happen (EP)	2014
ACODA	Truth Seeker	2015
American Fangs	Dirty Legs	2015
Press to MECO	Good Intent	2015
