= Hey Everyone! =

Studio album by Dananananaykroyd
- Released: 6 April 2009
- Recorded: 2008
- Genre: Post-hardcore; Alternative rock
- Length: 45:16
- Label: Best Before Records
- Producer: Machine

Dananananaykroyd chronology
| Sissy Hits (2008) | Hey Everyone! (2009) | There Is a Way (2011) |

Professional ratings
Review scores
| Source | Rating |
|---|---|
| Drowned in Sound | (8/10) link |
| The Fly | link |
| Gigwise.com | link |
| NME | link |
| Pitchfork Media | (7.4/10) link |
| Rockfeedback | link |
| The Scotsman | link |
| Sputnik Music | link |
| This Is Fake DIY | link |

Hey Everyone! is the debut album by Glasgow-based rock band Dananananaykroyd, released on 6 April 2009 on the Best Before Records label. The album debuted on the UK Albums Chart at number 154 in its week of release.

Initial critical reception was generally positive, ClashMusic.com commenting: "Dananananaykroyd have made a debut album as unforgettable as their name is unwieldy, and it is a magnificent achievement." This Is Fake DIY also reviewed the album positively, saying "this is an album that's both satisfyingly violent, subtly tuneful and, dare we say it, not so hard to swallow that it has to stay an underground concern."

An NME review criticised the track order of the album, claiming that the three singles "Black Wax", "Totally Bone" and "Pink Sabbath" being grouped together was an unwise choice.

== Recording ==
The record was recorded in the Machine Shop in Hoboken, New Jersey in July and August 2008. The music was recorded almost completely live in one room, John Baillie Jnr's vocals were recorded with Machine while Calum Gunn's were recorded separately in Southern Studios in London. While recording, the band's guitarist David Roy made home movies which are now on Vimeo.

== Track listing ==
All lyrics are written by Calum Gunn and John Baillie Jnr, except where noted; all music is composed by David Roy.

| No. | Title | Lyrics | Length |
|---|---|---|---|
| 1. | "Hey Everyone" | | 1:31 |
| 2. | "Watch This!" | | 3:33 |
| 3. | "The Greater Than Symbol & the Hash" | Giles Bailey | 4:41 |
| 4. | "Black Wax" | | 4:03 |
| 5. | "Totally Bone" | Giles Bailey | 4:01 |
| 6. | "Pink Sabbath" | | 3:12 |
| 7. | "Infinity Milk" | | 4:25 |
| 8. | "One Chance" | | 1:00 |
| 9. | "Some Dresses" | Giles Bailey | 5:03 |
| 10. | "1993" | | 4:25 |
| 11. | "Hey James" | | 4:36 |
| 12. | "Song One Puzzle" | Giles Bailey | 4:52 |
