= Sharks (punk band) =

English punk rock band (2007–2013)

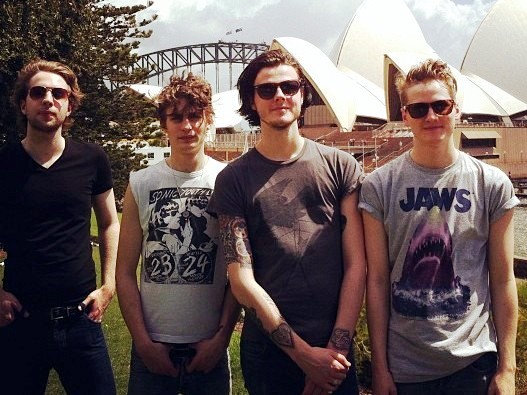
- Sharks' final lineup in February 2013, left to right: Bayliss, Lister, Mattock, and Murrihy

Background information
- Origin: Leamington Spa, England
- Genres: Punk rock, alternative rock
- Years active: 2007–2013
- Labels: Rise, Velvet Scene, Best Before, Coffeebreath and Heartache
- Past members: James Mattock; Andrew Bayliss; Sam Lister; Carl Murrihy; Christian O’Reilly; Adam Lovelock; Tony Corrales
- Website: Official Website

Sharks were an English punk rock band from Leamington Spa, Warwickshire, England, consisting of James Mattock (lead vocals and guitar), Andrew Bayliss (guitar), Sam Lister (drums), and Carl Murrihy (bass). Sharks disbanded in July 2013.

== History ==
Sharks formed in 2007. Their name is derived from a song by Gallows, 'In the Belly of a Shark'. In 2008 Sharks released a five track EP, Shallow Waters (recorded in Northampton, UK at The Lodge Recording Studio), and subsequently played with Gallows, The Ghost of a Thousand, Fucked Up, Babyshambles, The King Blues, Girls, Crime in Stereo, and Lostprophets. They supported The Gaslight Anthem during their 2010 UK and European tours.

=== Show of Hands (2010) ===
Shark's second five track EP, Show of Hands, which was recorded at Fortress Studios in London, was released by Best Before Records in October 2010. The first video from the EP premiered on 5 October 2010. Show of Hands received 4/5 from Kerrang! magazine, which described the album as "impressive [...] shimmering, grass-roots, British Punk" and "a revelation from start to finish". RockSound magazine gave the album 8/10, declaring that "writing with thoughtfulness, maturity and skill belying their youthful status, Sharks have quietly put together perhaps the most charming debut of the year."

Sharks were 'band of the day' on 21 October 2010 in The Guardian, which commented that "Sharks are into preserving the purity of first-album Clash" and "giving the contemporary music scene a good old slap in the face, to wake it out of its current torpor".

=== The Joys of Living 2008-2010 (2011) ===
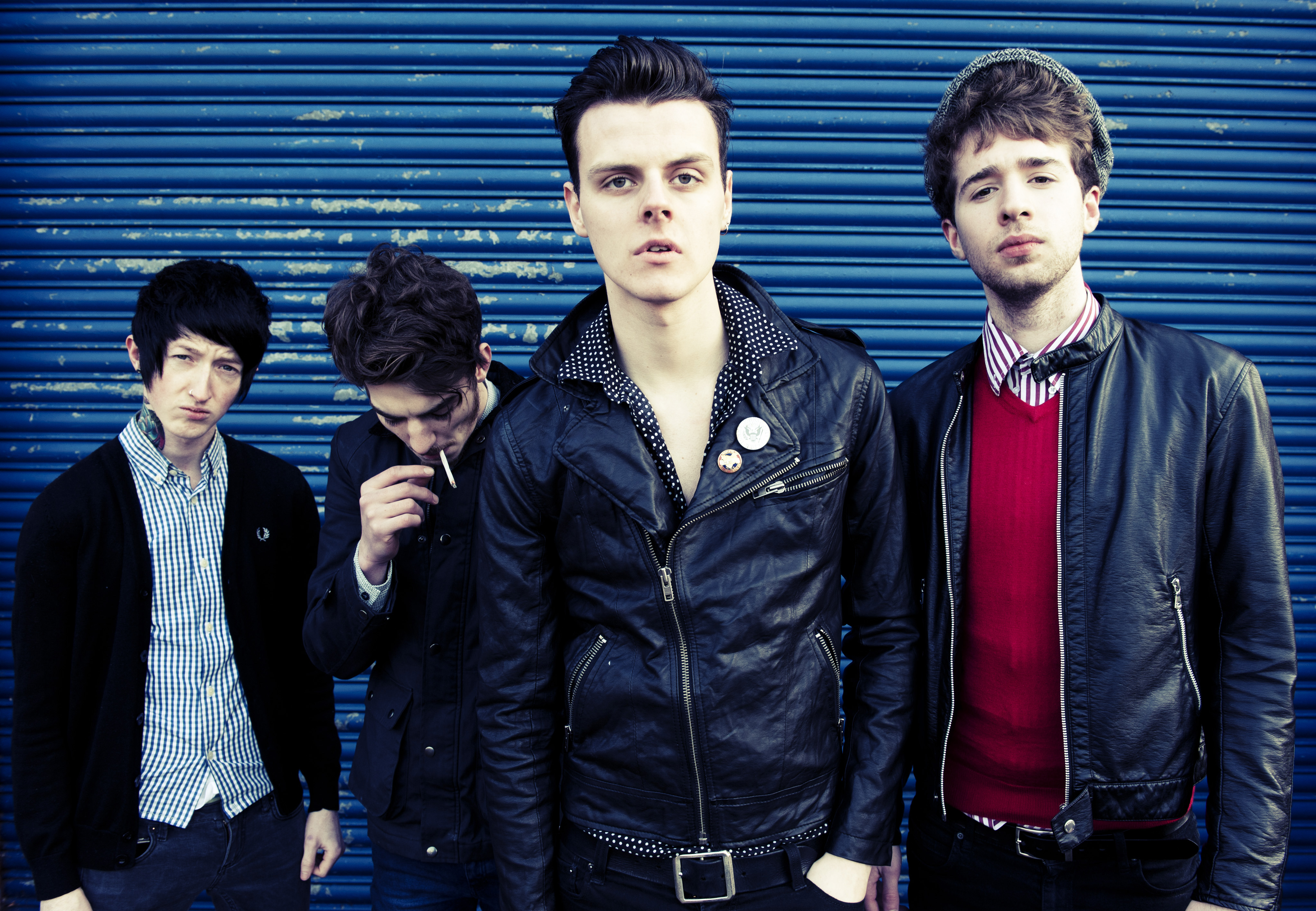
Sharks' 2008–11 lineup, left to right: O'Reilly, Lister, Mattock, and Bayliss

As announced on 9 December 2010, The Joys of Living 2008-2010, a 14 track compilation of previously released material (Shallow Waters, Common Grounds, and Show of Hands) plus two brand new songs, was released in the US, Canada, Australia and NZ on 5 April 2011 by Velvet Scene in association with Rise Records (CD, vinyl, and download). As a bonus, the Japanese edition, released on 6 April 2011, also features the three tracks from Sharks' 2009 split with Northern Towns.

The two new songs, 'Sweet Harness' and 'The Joys of Living', were recorded in early December 2010 at Fortress Studios in London. A 7" featuring the two new songs was released as a single by Coffebreath and Heartache. 'Sweet Harness' was made available as streaming audio on Sharks' Facebook page on 11 March 2011, as was the whole album on Punknews.org on 1 April.

Alternative Press magazine gave the album 4/5 stars, writing that "[t]hese 14 songs bristle with a wonderful sense of rock 'n' roll heritage that serves as a tribute to fallen heroes such as the Clash while simultaneously molding those influences into something refreshing and contemporary."

=== North American tours, etc. (2011) ===
Sharks supported Social Distortion during their 2011 US Spring Tour, and played their first ever US headline show on 29 May 2011 at 924 Gilman Street in Berkeley, California. Following a headlining tour of Canada in early June, Christian left Sharks, as announced on the band's Facebook page on 28 June 2011. From late June to early August, Sharks toured the US on the entire Warped Tour 2011 with their driver Rob Dempsey as a touring member on bass. Sharks appeared at the Summer Sonic festival in Tokyo and Osaka, Japan, in mid-August and played the Reading and Leeds festivals in the UK in late August. Stephen Carter from Gallows played bass on the Japan and UK festival dates. Sharks' original bassist, Adam Lovelock, filled in at their headline show at the Social in London on 31 August 2011. Sharks returned to North America in the autumn for the Alternative Press Tour Fall 2011 (13 October to 26 November), which was headlined by Four Year Strong, and during which Luke Schwartz played bass (as announced on Twitter on 5 October). On 11 November 2011 Sharks made their US television debut, performing 'Sweet Harness' on Fuel TV.

On 6 May 2011 Sharks recorded a Daytrotter Session at Horseshack studio, Rock Island, Illinois, which was released online on 15 October 2011.

=== No Gods (2012) ===
Sharks told NME that work on their debut full-length album would start as soon as they have finished all their overseas touring. They also said they had "about sixteen songs" and were "almost wrapped up with the writing process", which they had tried to finish prior to their 2011 North American tour. The album was recorded in Baltimore, MD, from September to early October 2011 and was produced by Brian McTernan. The band recorded a total of 14 tracks. Tony Corrales, formerly of The Exposed, having joined Sharks on a permanent basis, played bass on three songs (James Mattock played bass on all other tracks).

On 16 December 2011 Sharks revealed the album's title, No Gods. The album features 11 songs and was released by Rise Records on 19 March 2012 in the UK and on 20 March 2012 in the US.

As a pre-order exclusive, Sharks also released a 7" with two covers, 'VCR' (originally by The xx) and 'Motown Junk' (originally by Manic Street Preachers). These also make up two of the three bonus tracks on the Japanese edition of No Gods.

'Arcane Effigies', the first single taken from No Gods, premiered on BBC Radio 1 on 3 January 2012. The video for 'Arcane Effigies' premiered on 14 February 2012. According to an early album review by Entertainment Focus, "over the course of eleven infectious anthems, Sharks sharpen timeless melodies with an explosive edge tempered by intricate riffing and hypnotic harmonies. It's pure, poetic, and powerful." RockSound magazine gave the album 8/10 stars, declaring that No Gods "justifies the hype" and that "the album's glory is its masterful pop songwriting [...] with an anthemic joy that most American pop-punks can only dream of achieving." Q magazine gave the album 4/5 stars and called it "a starry-eyed celebration of yearning on a US factory floor, as idealised by British spa town punks."

Sharks announced on 22 March 2012 that Tony Corrales had left the band and had been replaced by Carl Murrihy, who made his first appearance with Sharks at the No Gods acoustic release show at Head Records, Leamington Spa, on 20 March 2012.

Sharks promoted No Gods during a headline tour of the UK (25 March to 6 April 2012). Just prior to the album's release, Sharks once again supported Social Distortion in the US (27 January to 18 February 2012). Sharks also supported Tribes on their UK spring tour (21 April to 9 May 2012).

The video for 'Patient Spider', the second single from No Gods, premiered on 18 June 2012, while the single itself was released on 2 July 2012. The video for 'Luck' premiered on 18 October 2012 and the single was released on 31 October 2012.

Sharks supported Pure Love on their UK tour in October and November 2012, as well as during their rescheduled dates in February 2013.

'Sea of All Seas', a previously unreleased track from the No Gods recording session, was included in a charity compilation album, Take Action, Volume 11, released on 8 January 2013. The song is also included on a vinyl single with three out-takes from No Gods which is being released along with Sharks' second album, Selfhood, on 29/30 April 2013.

=== Selfhood (2013) ===
In September 2012 Sharks began recording demos for a second studio album, which they hoped to finish writing by the end of the year. According to Mattock the band was "focusing on getting the best songs we can [..] out there as quickly as possible".

Recording for the new album, produced by Lewis Johns at the Ranch, Southampton, started on 26 November 2012 and was completed within two weeks.

According to James Mattock, "The whole approach with this record from the beginning was to have the process be very reckless and fun, and for every decision and idea not to be pondered on or over thought". He also said that he had written "most of the lyrics in a room above a morgue in [...] an old Victorian building with no heat, running water, or bathroom", and that these were "the most intimate and personal songs I've written - thus Selfhood is the most fitting title."

Sharks supported Blink-182 on their Australian Tour in February 2013 and were also part of the 2013 lineup for Australia's Soundwave Festival from 23 February to 4 March.

Selfhood (the title of the new album was revealed on Twitter on 22 February 2013) features 11 songs and was released in the UK on 29 April 2013 and in the United States on 30 April 2013. The Japanese edition features five bonus tracks (four demos of album tracks and one cover, 'My Drug Buddy', originally by The Lemonheads).

Big Cheese magazine gave Selfhood 4/5 stars and declared it "a classic before its time and another winner", while Alternative Press magazine, which also gave Selfhood 4/5 stars, praised Sharks' "skill with their classic source material" and called the album "a time capsule for musical Anglophiles of the '70s and '80s - and a virtual primer for anyone who missed them." Kerrang! magazine, on the other hand, while still giving the album 3/5 stars, thought that Selfhood was "a slow burn affairs, rather than a petrol bomb through the window, but there's still fire here."

The album was promoted via a headline tour of the UK from 29 April to 13 May 2013.

On 4 July 2013, Sharks announced via Facebook that they had "decided to end our journey as Sharks", but that "with this farewell, we leave you with three records of which we are immensely proud".

=== Post-Sharks ===
James Mattock's new US based project, The Violent Hearts, released a download only EP, The Penalty, on 19 February 2014. Both songs were released on vinyl on 7 October 2014. In 2014 Mattock joined The Computers on guitar. He also plays drums for Welsh Noir-Pop band The Nightmares.

Their Lonely Betters, featuring former Sharks members Andrew Bayliss (vocals & guitar), Sam Lister (drums), Carl Murrihy (guitar), and Adam Lovelock (bass), released two songs on Soundcloud on 13 August 2014.

== Description and influences ==
Shark's musical influences have been described as ranging from "The Buzzcocks, The Clash, Nick Cave, Joy Division, Husker Du, [to] Black Flag", while Dan Martin claims that "the Sharks strain of punk is imbued with a blue-collar longing straight out of Shitsville USA".

Taking stock of Sharks during their spring 2012 headline tour, The Guardian judged that "their pogo-punk may often look to the US, but Mattock's accent and lyrical vignettes remain defiantly British. [...] The key terrace-chant line of 'Hey Rudy, Rudy' may sound more like Kaiser Chiefs than the Clash, [and] there's not a whiff of Route 66 around On a Clear Day You Can See Yourself, a small-town tale of ambition and promise drip-dripping away. [...] Sweet Harness [has] a crunchy ascending chord progression that echoes pre-electronica Radiohead."

With the release of Sharks' second album, Selfhood, reviewers found that the band had moved "squarely into indie-rock territory - more The Smiths than Strummer's gang [The Clash]" or, alternatively, that they now had "a sound that's somewhere between Green Day and early Ash".

As James Mattock, Sharks' lead singer has explained, "I got into [punk] from digging up old records. It was more of an American thing that I discovered from bands like Green Day and Rancid. Then I dug deeper and found their influences and I got my head around the history of the big punk family tree". He was also heavily influenced by his parents' CD collection. Mattock has stated that his lyrics have been influenced by both Charles Bukowski and Billy Childish.

Sharks nevertheless say that they "believe in an uncompromised art to be embraced by any one who wants to listen. We don't seem to fit too comfortably in any particular music scene anyway, and we'll continue take it as a compliment and to be our own".

== Band members ==
=== Past members ===
- James Mattock - lead vocals, guitar (2007–2013)
- Andrew Bayliss - guitar (2007–2013)
- Sam Lister - drums (2007–2013)
- Adam Lovelock - bass (2007–2008)
- Christian O’Reilly - bass (2008–2011)
- Tony Corrales - bass (2011–2012)
- Carl Murrihy - bass (2012–2013)

=== Touring members ===
- Rob Dempsey - bass (2011 [Warped Tour])
- Stephen Carter - bass (2011 [Japan & UK festivals])
- Luke Schwartz - bass (2011 [Alternative Press Tour])

== Discography ==
- Shallow Waters EP (2008)
- Sharks / Northern Towns split EP (2009)
- "Common Grounds" single (2009)
- Show of Hands EP (2010)
- The Joys of Living 2008–2010 compilation album (2011)
- "Sweet Harness" single (2011)
- No Gods (2012)
- "VCR" single (2012)
- Selfhood (2013)
- "Sons and Daughters" single (2013)

== Music videos ==
Year	Song	Director	Album
2010	"It All Relates"	Ryan Mackfall	Show of Hands
2011	"Sweet Harness"	Ryan Mackfall	The Joys of Living 2008–2010
2012	"Arcane Effigies"	Ryan Mackfall	No Gods
2012	"Luck"	Ryan Mackfall	No Gods
2012	"Patient Spider"	Sitcom Soldiers	No Gods
2013	"Sunday's Hand"		Selfhood
2013	"Gold"		Selfhood
