= Johnny Foreigner vs Everything =

Studio album by Johnny Foreigner
- Released: 7 November 2011
- Recorded: 2010–2011
- Genres: Indie rock, post-punk
- Length: 56:10 (standard); 70:42 (extended vinyl)
- Labels: Alcopop!; HipHipHip; Vinyl Junkie Recordings

Johnny Foreigner chronology
Grace and the Bigger Picture (2009)	Johnny Foreigner vs Everything (2011)	Names (2012)

Alternate cover
- Vinyl release cover

Singles from Johnny Foreigner vs Everything
- 1. "Certain Songs" Released: April 18, 2011; 2. "(Don't) Show Us Your Fangs / The Hand The Slaps You Back" Released: September 12, 2011; 3. "You vs. Everything" Released: December 5, 2011

Professional ratings
Review scores
Source	Rating
Clash Music	link
Drowned In Sound	link
NME	link
Rock Sound	link
Sputnikmusic	link
Q Magazine	Jan 2012, p.123

Johnny Foreigner vs Everything is the third studio album by British indie rock band Johnny Foreigner. It was released on CD and MP3 on 5 December 2011 through Alcopop! Records, and on Double Vinyl LP in Summer 2012. The record marked their first studio album to be released without the aid of a Grammy-nominated producer (Machine producing their first record, Alex Newport producing their second); as well as their first studio album not released on Best Before Records. The album cover, as with their other albums, features drawings by Lewes Herriot.

The album was assigned a Metacritic rating of 66, indicating "generally favourable reviews". Some controversy arose when the NME website chose a writer who had already had disagreements with the band's lead singer Alexei to review the album. This writer gave the album a highly negative review and a score of 3.0/10. This was responded to with a backlash by fans and readers alike, who together used the NME's album rating system to give the album a score of 9.4/10.

== Track listing ==
All tracks are written by Johnny Foreigner.

Side I "Life!"

No.	Title	Length
1.	"If Im The Most Famous Boy You've Fucked, Then Honey, Yr In Trouble"	2:08
2.	"With Who, Who and What I've Got"	3:00
3.	"200X"	3:41
4.	"Hulk Hoegaarden, Gin Kinsella, David Duvodkany, Etc"	3:53
5.	"Johnny Foreigner vs You"	3:22
6.	"Concret1"	1:36
Total length:		17:40

Side II "Significance!"

No.	Title	Length
7.	"Electricity vs the Dead"	2:44
8.	"Jess, You Got Yr Song, So Leave"	4:09
9.	"Supermorning"	4:02
10.	"What Drummers Get"	2:41
11.	"New Street, You Can Take It"	3:58
12.	"Concret2"	1:26
Total length:		18:59

Side III "Magic!"

No.	Title	Length
13.	"(Don't) Show Us Your Fangs"	2:48
14.	"You vs Everything"	3:16
15.	"Doesn't Believe in Angels"	3:34
16.	"The Swell/Like Neverwhere"	6:22
17.	"Alternate Timelines Piling Up"	3:31
Total length:		19:30

No.	Title	Length
Total length:		56:10

=== Double 12" Vynile Extended Version ===
The pressing of the album on vinyl adds all 3 bsides off the Certain Songs are Cursed EP (What Drummers Get single)—and 1 from each the (Don't) Show Us Your Fangs and You vs Everything singles.

This version of the album with the added collection is also available on various streaming platforms.

Side IV "Everything After"

No.	Title	Length
18.	"Twin Sisterzz" (1st bside on Certain Songs EP/single.)	2:34
19.	"Johnny Foreigner vs You (Cursed Version)" (2nd bside on Certain Songs EP/single.)	2:45
20.	"Certain Songs" (3rd bside on Certain Songs EP/single.)	3:32
21.	"The Hand That Slaps You Back" (Only bside on (Don't) Show Us Your Fangs single.)	2:31
22.	"Ps, Not Soon Enough" (1st bside on You vs. Everything single.)	3:08
Total length:		14:32

No.	Title	Length
Total length:		70:42

=== Bonus Track Version ===
The Apple Music exclusive "Bonus Track Version" has the same tracklist as the version above, with the exception of an added You vs. Everything single b-side; a recording of a live show played at the ‘Hipster Garden Party’ event at a private house party in Renne, France on the 24th June 2011.

No.	Title	Length
23.	"Johnny Foreigner vs the Hipster Garden Party"	17:19

=== Japan CD ===
The bonus tracks featured on the Vinyl Junkie Recordings Japan CD. Bonuses taken directly from the (Don't) Show Us Your Fangs single, and the band's self-released digital 2011 EP there when you need it.

"Japan Bonus Track"

No.	Title	Length
18.	"The Hand That Slaps You Back" (Only bside on (Don't) Show Us Your Fangs single.)	2:31
19.	"199x" (Track 3 off their "there when you need it" EP.)	3:29
20.	"With Who, Who and What I've Got. w/ Yesterday's Pupil" (Track 1 off their "there when you need it" EP: Instead of 'yesterdays pupil' (like listed on the CD), the EP instead credits 'peach'; Yesterday's Pupil's real name.)	3:19
Total length:		9:21

No.	Title	Length
Total length:		65:31
