= You Can Do Better =

Studio album by Johnny Foreigner
- Released: 10 March 2014
- Genre: Indie rock
- Length: 38:45
- Label: Alcopop! (UK); Vinyl Junkie (Japan); Lame-O (US)

Johnny Foreigner chronology
Names (2012)	You Can Do Better (2014)

Professional ratings
Aggregate scores
Source	Rating
Metacritic	65/100
Review scores
Source	Rating
Drowned in Sound	8/10

You Can Do Better is the fourth studio album by British rock band Johnny Foreigner. It was released in March 2014 under Alcopop! Records in the UK and Vinyl Junkie in Japan. Lame-O Records released the album in the United States on 19 August 2014.

== Track list ==
No.	Title	Length
1.	"Shipping"	3:03
2.	"Le Sigh"	2:27
3.	"in Capitals"	4:17
4.	"Riff Glitchard"	4:58
5.	"The Last Queens of Scotland"	3:02
6.	"Stop Talking About Ghosts"	2:30
7.	"Wifi Beach"	2:40
8.	"To the Death"	3:31
9.	"Le Schwing"	3:04
10.	"Devastator"" (contains hidden track "To the Deaf" at 7:27)	10:33
