= Grace and the Bigger Picture =

Studio album by Johnny Foreigner
- Released: 26 October 2009
- Recorded: 2008–2009
- Genre: Post-punk, indie rock, garage punk
- Length: 41:48
- Label: Best Before Records
- Producer: Alex Newport

Johnny Foreigner chronology
Waited Up 'til It Was Light (2008)	Grace and the Bigger Picture (2009)	Johnny Foreigner vs Everything (2011)

Singles from Grace and the Bigger Picture
- 1. "Feels Like Summer" Released: 24 June 2009; 2. "Criminals" Released: 12 October 2009; 3. "Every Cloakroom Ever" Released: Early 2010

Professional ratings
Review scores
Source	Rating
Drowned in Sound	6/10 stars
NME	7/10 stars
Planet Sound	8/10 stars

Grace and the Bigger Picture is the second album by British band Johnny Foreigner and was released on Best Before Records worldwide on 26 October 2009. The album was recorded at Futureshock Studios in Brooklyn and produced by Alex Newport (assisted by Chris Tabron and Brenden Beu) in early 2009.

== Track listing ==
All tracks are written by Johnny Foreigner

No.	Title	Length
1.	"Choose Yr Side and Shut Up!"	1:51
2.	"Security to the Promenade"	2:40
3.	"Ghost the Festivals"	2:26
4.	"Feels Like Summer"	1:56
5.	"I'llchoosemysideandshutup, Alright"	1:34
6.	"Criminals"	3:24
7.	"Custom Scenes and the Parties That Make Them"	2:59
8.	"More Heart, Less Tongue"	2:52
9.	"Kingston Called, They Want Their Lost Youth Back"	1:02
10.	"He Awoke on a Beach in Aberystwyth"	2:56
11.	"(Graces)"	0:39
12.	"Dark Harbourzz"	2:01
13.	"Every Cloakroom Ever"	2:15
14.	"More Tongue, Less Heart"	1:43
15.	"The Coast Was Always Clear" (includes hidden track "(Close..)")	11:31

== Personnel ==
- Alexei Berrow - guitars
- Kelly Southern - bass
- Junior Elvis Washington Laidley - drums
