= Say Hi to the Band =

Studio album by Stagecoach
- Released: (United Kingdom) 13 May 2013
- Genre: Alternative rock, indie rock
- Length: 38:04
- Label: Alcopop! Records
- Producer: Rory Attwell

Stagecoach chronology
Crash My Ride (2010)	Say Hi to the Band (2013)

Singles from Say Hi to the Band
- 1. "56k Dial-Up" Released: 21 April 2012; 2. "Work! Work! Work!" Released: 5 March 2013; 3. "Action" Released: 13 June 2013

Professional ratings
Review scores
Source	Rating
The 405	8.5/10 stars
7 Bit Arcade	(favorable)
Punktastic	(favorable)

Say Hi to the Band is the debut album of the Surrey-based alternative rock band Stagecoach.

== Track listing ==
All tracks are written by Stagecoach.

No.	Title	Length
1.	"Work! Work! Work!"	2:58
2.	"Action"	2:22
3.	"56k Dial-Up"	2:55
4.	"A New Hand"	3:10
5.	"Threequel"	3:20
6.	"King's Resolve"	3:40
7.	"First & Last"	5:41
8.	"Nothing Leads You Astray"	3:01
9.	"We Got Tasers"	3:03
10.	"I'm Not Your House"	4:32
11.	"Video Shop"	3:33
Total length:		38:04

International Bonus Tracks
No.	Title	Length
12.	"Jonah Lomu"	2:50
13.	"Tony Hawk"	2:54
Total length:		43:52

== Personnel ==
- Luke Barham - rhythm guitar, lead vocals
- Nick Tanner - lead guitar
- John Harrington - bass guitar, backing vocals
- Tom 'Chop' Lewis - mandolin, synthesizer, backing vocals
- Matt Emery - drums, percussion, backing vocals

== Singles ==
- "56k Dial-Up"
  - Released: April 2012
- "Work! Work! Work!"
  - Released: March 2013
- "Action"
  - Released: June 2013
