= Dananananaykroyd =

Scottish rock band

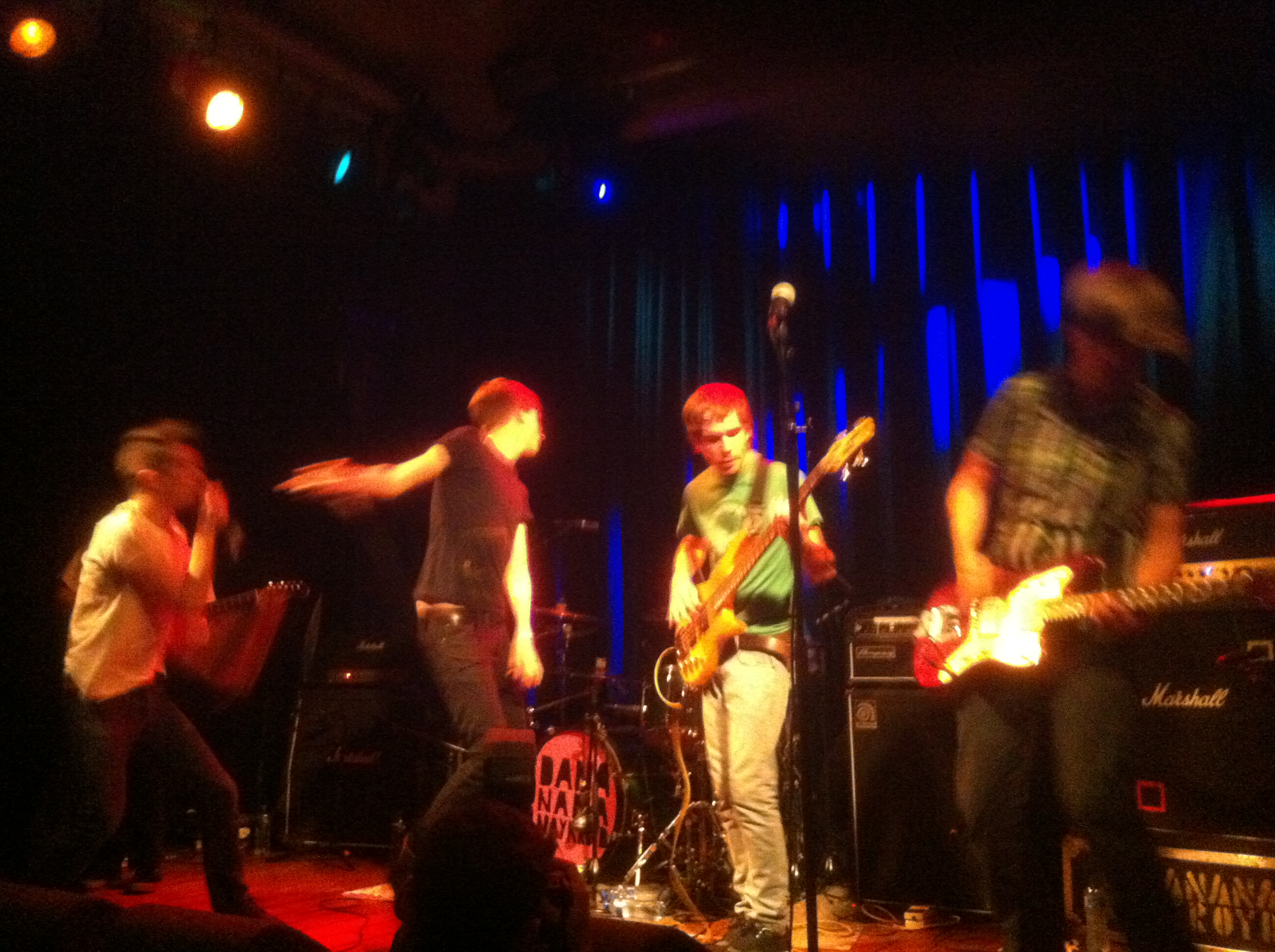
- Dananananaykroyd in 2011

Background information
- Origin: Glasgow, Scotland
- Genres: Post-hardcore; indie rock; math rock; sass
- Years active: 2006–2011
- Labels: Pizza College, Dew Process, Best Before Records
- Past members: Duncan Robertson; David Roy; Calum Gunn; John Baillie Junior; Paul Bannon; Ryan McGinness; James Hamilton; Laura Hyde; Paul Carlin

Dananananaykroyd was a Scottish rock band from Glasgow, active from 2006 to 2011. Their name is a play on the name of actor Dan Aykroyd.

== Career ==
In 2006, Dananananaykroyd released two limited edition 7" singles, "Totally Bone" and "Some Dresses" on Moshi Moshi and Jealous Records respectively. A Japan-only CD EP, collecting both singles, was later released on Tokyo's Klee/Rallye records. Singer Giles Bailey left the group and was replaced by drummer Calum Gunn while John Baillie Jnr joined the band on drums and additional lead vocals.

Dananananaykroyd released their first EP, Sissy Hits, on London-based Holy Roar Records in June 2008. Shortly after, they introduced ex-Rumsfeld drummer Paul Carlin as their new (other) drummer after James Hamilton of Errors left the band. Dananananaykroyd signed to the independent London label Best Before Records shortly thereafter, and recorded their debut full-length album Hey Everyone! in the US with producer Machine which was released in April 2009.

The band have toured the UK extensively with bands such as Foals, Queens of the Stone Age and in 2009 completed a European tour with the Kaiser Chiefs. They played at the Reading and Leeds Festivals in 2009 and 2011.

In June 2009, the band announced that bass player Laura Hyde had left, and would be replaced on tour by bassist Ryan McGinness.

In August 2009, near the beginning of the band's gig in Sydney, singer John Baillie Junior jumped off stage and broke his arm causing the band to cancel the remainder of their Australian tour, as well as appearances at Pukkelpop and Belladrum festivals. Baillie snapped both bones that run from the wrist to the elbow, shearing a large chunk of bone from his elbow. Emergency surgery was needed in Sydney to fix the injury, leaving four metal screws in his arm permanently. His return show (with Calum and John sharing vocals duties) was Reading Festival only three weeks later which the band opened, playing to 10,000+ people on the Radio 1/NME stage. The band returned to the venue in Sydney two years later (to the day) and continued the show from the floor where he fell.

The song "Black Wax" is featured in the football video game FIFA 10.

In 2010, Dananananaykroyd performed on Australian radio station Triple J's Like a Version where they performed their own song "Black Wax" and a cover on "Whip It" (originally by Devo) while they were in Sydney; it was recorded the same day as JBJ's accident which saw the rest of the tour being cancelled. The band played a short UK tour in May 2010 under the name 'The Sissy Hits', in which they debuted tracks from the forthcoming record.

Over November and December 2010, the band recorded their second album in Los Angeles with producer Ross Robinson, on 16 March 2011 Dananananaykroyd announced details of the album, titled There Is A Way, which was released in June 2011.

On 30 September 2011, it was announced that the band would be splitting. Their final show took place on 12 November 2011.

=== Related bands ===
Since then members John Baillie Jnr, David Roy, Ryan McGinness as well as Paul Bannon who played drums on their last tour have formed a band called Alarm Bells. They released their first EP Part One on limited edition 12" vinyl via bandcamp.

Duncan Robertson and Paul Carlin have gone on to form a band called Ex Teens.

Calum Gunn was a part of the punk band Her Parents, who released their first album, Physical Release, on 20 August 2012.

John Baillie Jnr later formed Bossy Love with singer Amandah Wilkinson from Operator Please.

== Final line-up ==
- Duncan Robertson – guitar
- David Roy – guitar
- Calum Gunn – vocals
- John Baillie Junior – vocals
- Paul Bannon – drums
- Ryan McGinness – bass

== Discography ==
=== Albums ===
- Hey Everyone! (2009)
- There Is a Way (2011)

=== Singles ===
- "Totally Bone" / "Hey Giles" on Moshi Moshi records
- "Some Dresses" / "Genuine Lbs" on Jealous Records
- "Pink Sabbath" / "Chrome Rainbow" on Best Before Records
- "Black Wax" / "No Wage" on Best Before Records (23 March 2009)
- "Some Dresses" / "America Runs on Duncan" on Best Before Records
- "Muscle Memory" on Pizza College (6 June 2011)
- "Think & Feel" on Pizza College (7 November 2011)

=== EPs ===
- Sissy Hits (Holy Roar Records) (9 June 2008)
- "Shrapnel!" (exclusive HMV 'There Is a Way' bonus EP)

=== Music videos ===
- "Black Wax" (2009)
- "Some Dresses" (2009)
- "Muscle Memory" (2011)
