= Gentle Friendly =

English band

Gentle Friendly are an English, London-based band, consisting of David Maurice (vocals, keyboards) and Richard Manber (drums, keyboards). They play explosive music that was described as "kaleidoscopic claustrophonics" and "as arresting as it was evasive".

Gentle Friendly formed in 2007 whilst David attended university in London. Morris found a drunk kit in a skip along with a large amount of high quality coffee and after several caffeine-fueled sessions in his basement the pair began to play live. Early lo-fi basement recordings were sold at shows on home-made cdrs and released on the Esses Together/Blast Debris (Debris from Blasts Had 1968 - 2008) cassette by Stop Scratching in October 2008. The following month No Pain In Pop released the Night Tape EP, recorded in a remote cottage on the Wales/Shropshire border, on 7". Their debut record, Ride Slow, was released by Upset The Rhythm in November 2009.
