= Waited Up 'til It Was Light =

Studio album by Johnny Foreigner
- Released: 2 June 2008
- Recorded: 2007–2008
- Genre: Indie rock, post-punk, math rock
- Length: 43:25
- Label: Best Before Records; Nettwerk
- Producer: Machine

Johnny Foreigner chronology
Arcs Across The City (2007)	Waited Up 'til It Was Light (2008)	Grace and the Bigger Picture (2009)

Singles from Waited Up 'til It Was Light
- 1. "Our Bipolar Friends"; 2. "Eyes Wide Terrified"; 3. "Salt, Peppa and Spinderella"; 4. "DJ's Get Doubts/Lea Room"

Professional ratings
Review scores
Source	Rating
AbsolutePunk.net	86%
AllMusic	3.5/5 stars
Drowned In Sound	8/10 stars
InTheNews	7/10 stars
musicOMH	3/5 stars
NME	8/10 stars

Waited Up 'til It Was Light is the debut album by British band Johnny Foreigner and was released on UK independent label Best Before Records on 2 June 2008. The album was licensed to Nettwerk by Best Before and released through online retailers in North America on 22 July 2008, and in stores on 23 September 2008. It was recorded in Hoboken, New Jersey with producer Machine, whose previous credits include work with notable contemporary hard rock acts including Lamb of God, Clutch, and King Crimson. The artwork was designed by Lewes Herriot and showed several Birmingham landmarks, with the UK release having interchangeable covers. The title is a reference to the Casiotone for the Painfully Alone song "Don't They Have Payphones Wherever You Were Last Night".

A track-by-track explanation of the album from Alexei Berrow, guitarist and singer of the band, can be found here.

== Track listing ==
All tracks are written by Johnny Foreigner.

No.	Title	Length
1.	"Lea Room"	2:23
2.	"Our Bipolar Friends"	3:19
3.	"Eyes Wide Terrified"	3:47
4.	"Cranes and Cranes and Cranes and Cranes"	2:35
5.	"The End and Everything After"	3:11
6.	"Hennings Favourite"	3:23
7.	"Salt, Peppa and Spinderella"	2:54
8.	"Yes! You Talk Too Fast"	3:21
9.	"DJs Get Doubts"	2:36
10.	"Sometimes in the Bullring"	4:21
11.	"Yr All Just Jealous"	2:50
12.	"Absolute Balance"	4:59
13.	"The Hidden Song at the End of the Record"	3:40
Total length:		43:19

The North American release contains a re-recording of Arcs Across the City track "Champagne Girls I Have Known" between "Lea Room" and "Our Bipolar Friends."
