= Crash My Ride =

EP by Stagecoach
- Released: (United Kingdom) 19 June 2010
- Genre: Alternative rock, indie rock
- Length: 18:31
- Label: Alcopop! Records

Stagecoach chronology
We Got Tazers! (2009)	Crash My Ride (2010)	Say Hi to the Band (2013)

Professional ratings
Review scores
Source	Rating
The 405	10/10 stars
Alter The Press	4/5 stars
Punktastic	4/5 stars
Rock Sound	8/10 stars

Crash My Ride is a six-track EP from the alternative rock band Stagecoach released in 2010.

The track "Axe Behind My Back" was used in the trailer for the film Killing Bono.

== Track listing ==
All music is composed by Stagecoach

No.	Title	Length
1.	"Hieroglyphics"	2:19
2.	"Map To The Freezer"	2:18
3.	"Axe Behind My Back"	3:48
4.	"Good! Great! Better! Best!"	2:59
5.	"Headbangers Ball"	3:18
6.	"Fish Tank Glow"	3:50
Total length:		18:31

== Personnel ==
- Luke Barham - rhythm guitar, lead vocals
- Nick Tanner - lead guitar
- John Harrington - bass guitar, backing vocals
- Tom 'Chop' Lewis - mandolin, synthesizer, backing vocals
- Matt Emery - drums, percussion, backing vocals
