= Skinned Teen =

English riot grrrl band

- Origin: London, England
- Genre: Riot grrrl
- Years active: 1993–1994
- Labels: Soul Static Sound; Lookout Records
- Past members: Layla Gibbon; Flossy White; Esme Young

Skinned Teen was a riot grrrl band from London, England, active in the early 1990s. They have been cited as an inspiration by Beth Ditto, Gina Birch and Josephine Olausson of Love Is All.

== History ==
Skinned Teen was formed by teenagers Layla Gibbon, Flossy White and Esme Young in London in 1992. Inspired by US Riot Grrrl, Huggy Bear and The Shaggs, the band were offered their first gig after approaching Kathleen Hanna following a Huggy Bear/Bikini Kill all-girl show on their 1993 UK tour. They recorded and released their debut Karate Hairdresser EP later in 1993 on Soul Static Sound, and recorded a Peel Session in December of that year. Their early sound has been described as 'reminiscent of both The Slits and Kleenex'. Layla Gibbon also contributed to an EP by The Element Of Crime (featuring members of Huggy Bear and Linus) and produced riot grrrl zines including Drop Babies.

Following appearances on joint/compilation releases with contemporaries such as Comet Gain and Yummy Fur, Skinned Teen's debut album Bazooka Smooth! (a split with Raooul) was released on Lookout Records in 1994, showcasing a more experimental range of musical styles.

Despite their short lifespan and relative obscurity, Skinned Teen can be acclaimed as the first pure UK riot grrrl band, as the other UK bands initially associated with the genre (e.g. Huggy Bear, Voodoo Queens, Mambo Taxi, Linus) had previous experience in the indie scene. Their youth and DIY spirit remain an inspiration to musicians and fans of the genre and echoes of their sound can be heard in bands to the present day. According to Sam Knee, Skinned Teen was "a rare UK adopter of the primitive punk assault of the DC/Olympia scenes" and together with Huggy Bear "represented a brief return to true DIY youth culture during the early '90s."

Following the dissolution of the band and a move to Brighton, Gibbon produced Chimps zine and released an eponymous EP on Slampt records as Petty Crime, a trio which included Peter Rojas on drums. Later based in San Francisco, Gibbon formed Shady Ladies with the Yao sisters from Emily's Sassy Lime, and Modern Reveries with Miya Osaki (The Chinkees) and Vice Cooler. Modern Reveries released an EP on Bristol's Local Kid records. Gibbon went on to edit Maximumrocknroll magazine and as of 2017 was playing in and recording with girlSperm (a.k.a. gSp) with Tobi Vail and Marissa Magic.

Skinned Teen made an appearance in It Changed My Life: Bikini Kill In The U.K., a documentary produced by Lucy Thane in 1993.

Thurston Moore of Sonic Youth chose a Skinned Teen song ("Pillowcase Kisser") for the retrospective compilation album Rough Trade 30 in 2006, which was later used on the soundtrack of a Skins episode in 2009.

== Discography ==
- Karate Hairdresser EP (1993), Soul Static Sound
- Some Hearts Paid To Lie EP (1993), Wiiija [split with Comet Gain, Pussycat Trash, Linus]
- Bazooka Smooth! LP/CD (1994), Lookout Records [split with Raooul]
- Total Tiger Beat Cassette (1995), Spazoom
- Skinned Teen (2020), Vague Absolutes [peel session recordings]

=== Compilation appearances ===
- Elastic Jet Mission LP (1994), Slampt (also inc. Yummy Fur, Lungleg, Golden Starlet, Milky Wimpshake, Kenickie)
- Battle of the Bands 7" (1998), Super 8 (also inc. The Rondelles)
