= Kittredge =

Kittredge may refer to:

- Kittredge (name)
- Kittredge (grape), hybrid wine grape that is also known as Ives noir

== Places ==
- Kittredge, Colorado, census-designated place in Jefferson County, Colorado
- Kittredge, Illinois, unincorporated community in Carroll County, Illinois
- Kittredge Mansion, historic house in North Andover, Massachusetts
- Alvah Kittredge House, historic house in Boston, Massachusetts

== See also ==
- Kit Kittredge: An American Girl, 2008 American comedy-drama film
