= The Pool (magazine) =

Online women's magazine

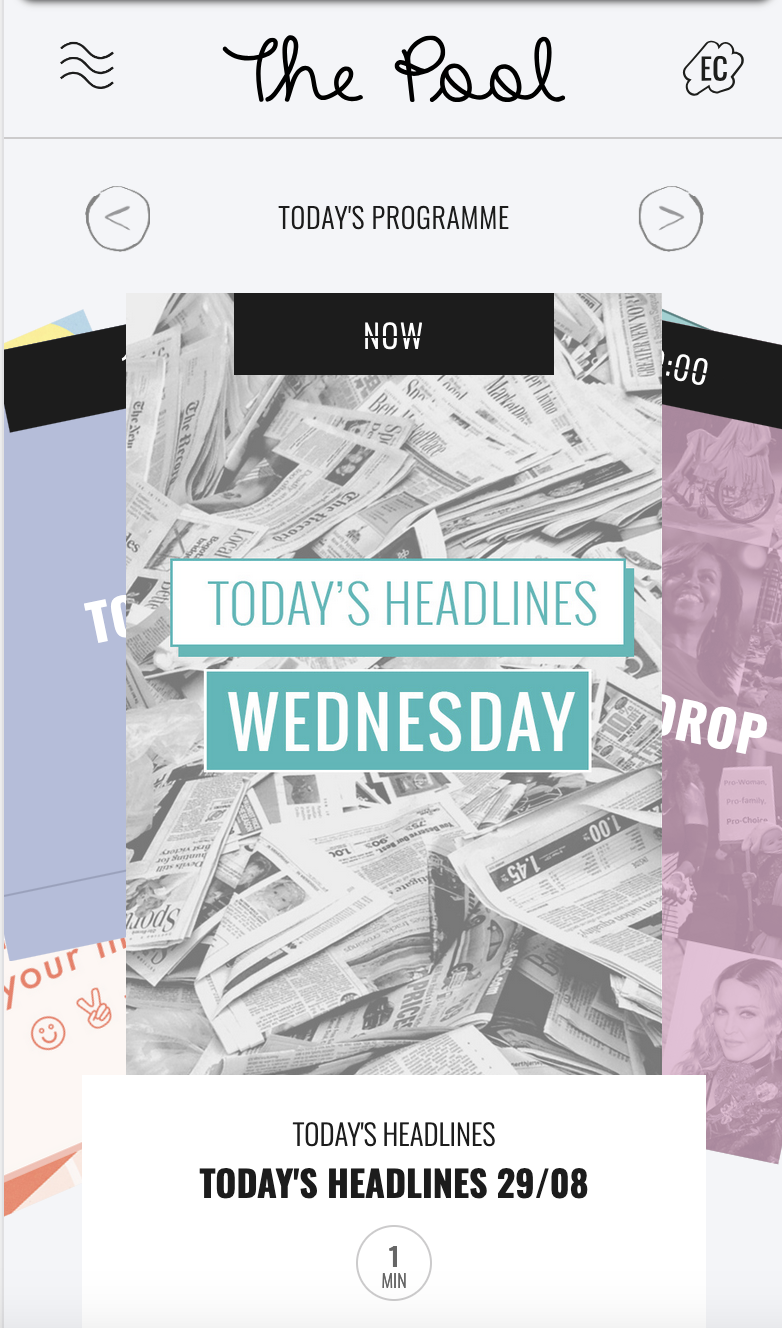
- Screenshot of the website
- Former editors: Cate Sevilla
- Categories: Women's magazine
- Frequency: Daily
- Format: Online women's magazine
- Founded: 2015
- Company: The Pool (UK)
- Country: United Kingdom
- Based in: London
- Language: UK English

The Pool was an online women's magazine founded in 2015 by BBC Radio 6 DJ Lauren Laverne and former editor-in-chief of Cosmopolitan and Red magazine, Sam Baker. According to Baker, the vision for the website was for "interesting, inspiring, original content for busy women". and was invested in by Fourteen17 at its launch.

== Background and launch ==
Laverne and Baker came up with the idea for The Pool in 2013 over coffee. Speaking to The Guardian, Laverne said: "..we started kicking around the idea of doing something small and bloggy, and it grew and grew. It raised £4m from investors. Laverne noted that its design should suit the lifestyles of its readers, going on to say: "Busy women — which is all women I know — do not have time to sit and watch a five-minute tutorial on how to use a flipping website."

When talking to Newsweek in 2016, then co-founder Sam Baker discussed why they chose a curated approach:

"The print publications that have been successful are the ones which put the reader first and are born out of a direct need—we employed that same technique. Neither of us were reading magazines anymore, nor were any of our friends. Editors went out of fashion. People wanted to choose for themselves—for example deciding which of the over 900 articles about Prince to read. Personally, I don't want to have to plough through 900 odd articles to find a good one. Of all the people we spoke to before the launch only one said, "Why would I need this? I read 35 blogs a week." Everyone else said, "I don't have the time or inclination to read 35 blogs a week."

Baker spoke to the Media Leader in 2017, adding:

"It got its own momentum right from the start so it’s been insane," she says. "We didn't do the classic digital thing of fling it out there, use your users as research in quite a disrespectful way like the tech industry behaves quite a lot. "We gave birth to an adolescent; we'd spent the best part of a year talking to users, women, broadly 25-50 about what they wanted, what their lives were like, how their lives were changing, how they felt about mobile and also crucially how they felt about the internet and content."

The Pool (UK) was officially incorporated on 4 June 2014 and then formally launched in April 2015.

=== Logo, brand and identity ===
The Pool's website was designed around its own bespoke research commissioned in-house, which said that 40 per cent of women (in their sample of 1001) had half an hour to spare to consume any media. Sara Horrocks, who was its then Creative Director and led its web design, said: "People are very time-poor." She added: "We didn't want them to get to the site and then get lost. We don't want to waste their time, we want to inform and stimulate them." It opted to provide a set number of articles per day. The following fonts were deployed for the website: Roboto for its copy and Oswald light and bold for its headlines.

By 2017, The Pool had expanded and created roles "...AV and commercial will allow us to provide more brands with more meaningful partnership opportunities in a safe environment."

== Columnists and contributors ==
At its launch, it had the following columnists and writers: Sali Hughes, Sasha Wilkins, Thomasina Miers, Laura Craik and Viv Groskop.

Commenting on its range of contributors, Baker told Book Machine: "I love the diverse range of creators that we are able to feature on The Pool – not just I, but the whole team are able to champion women (particularly) whose work we love. It's really impossible to pick a favourite, but I particularly enjoy doing 'in conversation with' events that we then turn into videos that live on. Cheryl Strayed, Maggie O'Farrell, Maria Semple, just off the top of my head, were all exactly as smart and great company as you would hope. We recently did a tour with Joanna Trollope and SmartWorks which was such good fun (Joanna was unexpectedly, erm, irreverent!) And Harriet Harman appeared on a Gamechangers panel I hosted for The Pool – she was brilliant. She could have easily done the whole thing on her own and come back for more!"

=== Books ===
Published by Pan Macmillan UK, Life Honestly Strong Opinions from Smart Women was an ebook compendium of articles with introductions from both Sam Baker and Lauren Laverne.

Interesting, entertaining, thought-provoking, keeping me up-to-date on the most worthwhile books, the most exciting new make-up, the best telly and unpacking important issues into 'normal-speak', The Pool is one of my best friends. -- Marian Keyes

It was also referred to in Always Take Notes Advice from Some of the World's Greatest Writers and Baker's "The Shift JOIN THE MENOPAUSE REVOLUTION".

It featured in three titles in 2018: the Writers' & Artists' Yearbook 2018, Vagina A Re-education by Lynn Enright, Misogyny Online A Short (and Brutish) History by Emma A. Jane. It went onto to feature in the Writers' & Artists' Yearbook 2019.

=== Academic impact ===
As of January 2025, its articles have appeared in a number of open access academic papers. They were also referenced in the following academic books: Revenge Pornography Gender, Sexuality and Motivations in 2017, Brexit Geographies in 2020 The Routledge Companion to Journalism Ethics in 2021, and Analyzing Digital Discourses Between Convergence and Controversy in 2022.

== Closure ==
The Pool went into administration in 2019 but as its editor, Cate Sevilla, revealed in a tweet, staff were only informed on the evening prior to 1 February 2019.

=== Business model ===
At its launch in 2015, Baker said: "When we launched I think everyone was in a race to the bottom… If you're in a pile-it-high-sell-it-cheap business that's fine, but to me saying that only programmatic and big traffic counts is like saying the only TV ad worth buying is in the Coronation Street ad break – that's nuts.... Programmatic is throwing all your money at that and hoping one click translates, whereas what we do is produce quality content for your brand that will make you part of the conversation with our readers rather than interrupting it all the time and getting on their nerves. We won’t do anything other than that because users hate it because it interrupts their experience. This is where ad-blockers come in."

They also established a partnership with Digitas LBi for their social media analysis and audience insight as a digital-only publication.

In 2017, it launched a £3 exclusive newsletter for VIP members, with Jo Morrell, the then Chief Commercial Officer, telling the Media Leader: "Testament to the brand resonance, and strength of engagement The Pool has, we have already had an impressive uptake from our regular readers, and this presents another opportunity for the right brands to interact in a positive way with our highly influential, high spending audience."

Concurrently, it also launched a commercial service called "The Street" led by the Fashion Partnerships Director, Melanie Hearn in the same year. Described by Jo Morrell "...as a way to support fashion retailers who are looking to drive sales, something "they need right now" At the time, it had brand partnerships also called advertisers with Michael Kors, Lacoste, French Connection and American Express. in addition to more than 35 million page views and 1 million monthly.

In remarking upon its future direction, then newly appointed chair, Tanya Joseph said: "It's about taking what we have got and evolving it. Two years on, what do we do now. The sign of a successful business is not to standstill but think what have we learnt, what do we need to get better. Constantly evolving."

=== Demise ===
Eleanor Mills, chairwoman of Women in Journalism, spoke to the BBC about its demise and argued that it was difficult for the company to attract digital advertising due to the dominance of Facebook and Google, coupled with the rise of influencers who beauty and fashion brands sought to partner with instead of traditional magazines. An unnamed industry expert told the BBC it "...was caught in a 'deadly vortex' of declining advertising revenues."

In the year before its administration, it lost £1.8 million in highlighting its continued difficulty in generating subscriptions when its content was provided for free, Jenny Eclair opined that "The Pool was the kind of magazine I'd have bought in a newsagent had it been in print. But it wasn't in print, it was online and it was free unless you checked out the small print and opted to subscribe, only I didn't notice/bother and I'd like to apologise." Clair Woodward wrote for the New Statesman of its demise "...but unless those of us delighted, informed and amused by any kind of journalism are prepared to put a few pennies in the hat of those who are producing that delight via 'tip jar' sites like Patreon, it will disappear, and all we'll be left with is cat videos and clickbait."

=== Liquidation and dissolution ===
A number of freelance journalists went unpaid due to its collapse, they included Laura Craik who wrote for the Evening Standard that she was owed £7,250, which amounted to five months' work. A GoFundMe was launched for its unpaid freelancers and sought to raise £24,000 and closed at £31,280 in but were owed approximately more than £65,000. On 13 March 2019, it received an order for winding up following a petition by HMRC. Nobody from The Pool (UK) attended court and was ordered to wind up as per the Insolvency Act 1986. The company was officially dissolved on 26 January 2023.

=== Shareholders ===
Betty Investments Limited were the majority shareholder with 75% or more shares. Fourteen17 had more than 25% in shares.

=== Domain and social media ===
Its domain now points to an Amazon services advertising affiliate programme, only its YouTube and SoundCloud channels are still active. Its X account has been deactivated and its Instagram account is now private; its Pinterest account and Facebook page no longer exist.

== Notes ==
- The GoFundMe refers to the amount that was raised but is banned so cannot be linked.
