= Johnny X =

Johnny X may refer to:

- A stage name for Pete Gofton.
- A 1995 extended play album from The Bouncing Souls.
- A name for a super hero that is really Johnny Test. See Johnny X.
