= Get In (Kenickie album) =

Studio album by Kenickie
- Released: 25 August 1998
- Recorded: 1998
- Studio: Strongroom, Wessex; Matrix in London
- Genre: Alternative rock; Britpop; indie pop; dance pop; disco; Hi-NRG
- Length: 56:22
- Label: EMI
- Producer: Adrian Bushby; Pete Gofton; Andy Carpenter

Kenickie chronology
At the Club (1997)	Get In (1998)

Singles from Get In
- 1. "I Would Fix You" Released: June 1998; 2. "Stay in the Sun" Released: August 1998

Get In is the second and final studio album by the British alternative rock band Kenickie. It was released on 25 August 1998 and reached number thirty-two on the UK Albums Chart. Get In includes the singles "I Would Fix You" and "Stay in the Sun".

== Production and release ==
The album was produced by Adrian Bushby and band-member Peter Gofton, except "I Would Fix You" which was produced by Bushby and Gofton with Andy Carpenter. Having been moved from the closed EMI subsidiary EMIdisc, the album was first released on CD and Cassette by the parent label. The album was re-released in February 2012 by Eastworld with seven bonus tracks. The artwork was designed by Nick Edwards.

== Critical reception ==
Professional ratings
Review scores
Source	Rating
AllMusic	3/5 stars
The Guardian	3/5 stars
Melody Maker	4/5 stars
NME	7/10
Q	2/5 stars
Select	4/5
Uncut	4/5 stars

Get In received generally positive reviews. In Melody Maker, Everett True praised it as "a most ravishing record" and contrasted the dark tone of the album's lyrics with its upbeat music, which he called "some of the most gorgeous, succulent pop around". NME reviewer Victoria Segal wrote: "This is the sound of a band refusing to play the game set out for them – attractive blonde singer, chirpy attitude, ladders to the top – risking a slide down the snakes instead ... the exuberant, lip-glossed evil of 'Punka' has been replaced by the maturity shorthand of strings and synths, flamenco flamboyance kicking up alongside deadpan electro, Shangrai-La's drumbeats booming next to high-kicking pastiche. It's often audaciously bleak ... but they aren't stupid enough to go to the other Svengali-approved extreme and dress up as tragic divas. If it's messy, it's because the situation described in 'I Would Fix You' is messy; if it's brave, it's never foolish."

Broadsheet newspaper The Daily Telegraph also praised the album:

The foursome from Sunderland ..., hitherto known for their bouncy but rather lightweight guitar-dominated pop ditties, have done a Supergrass and made a glorious second album that manages to be both enormously sophisticated and utterly fresh. What, exactly, is it about Get In that makes it so good? First, it manages to incorporate a huge variety of genres, from the Motown-meets-disco of 'Stay in the Sun' to the electronically-driven groove of 'Sixties Bitch', while always retaining its essential Kenickie-ness. Second, it features some quite gorgeous multi-layered backing vocals, over which the voice of lead singer and guitarist Lauren Laverne drifts dreamily, covering a range of emotions from sweet vulnerability to sneering defiance (although her attempt (Note: As per original text - in fact vocal on this track was performed by guitarist Marie Du Santiago) at jazz crooning on the big-band finale, 'Something's Got to Give', is not terribly convincing). Third, and most crucially, it bulges with terrific tunes; if forced to pick the best, I'd choose the glorious 'Psychic Defence', which has a plaintive chorus and an exquisite key change, but there are plenty more which are almost as good. This, in short, is the sound of a band growing up and making proper music without losing any of their saucy wit or their sense of fun.

== Track listing ==
All tracks are written by Laverne and Gofton; except where indicated.

No.	Title	Writer(s)	Length
1.	"Stay in the Sun"		3:43
2.	"Lunch at Lassiters"		4:44
3.	"I Would Fix You"	Laverne, Gofton, Du Santiago	4:32
4.	"60's Bitch"		2:56
5.	"Run Me Over"		3:53
6.	"And That's Why"	Laverne	2:56
7.	"Magnatron"	Du Santiago, Gofton	3:45
8.	"Weeknights"		4:48
9.	"Psychic Defence"		4:54
10.	"5 AM"	Du Santiago	4:00
11.	"411 (La la La)"		3:38
12.	"Something's Got to Give"	Du Santiago	12:32
13.	"Disco Xmas On the Dole" (hidden track on the end of "Something's Got to Give")

2012 bonus tracks
No.	Title	Writer(s)	Length
13.	"Rough Boys and Modern Girls"	Du Santiago
14.	"I Would Fix You (DJ Downfall mix)"	Laverne, Gofton, Du Santiago
15.	"Packed In"	Gofton
16.	"I Would Fix You (Mint Royale mix)"	Laverne, Gofton, Du Santiago
17.	"Hooray for Everything"	Laverne
18.	"Stay in the Sun (Fridge remix)"
19.	"Save Your Kisses for Me"	Tony Hiller, Lee Sheriden, Martin Lee

== Personnel ==
Kenickie

- Lauren Laverne
- Marie du Santiago
- Emmy-Kate Montrose
- Pete Gofton

Other personnel

- Becky Doe, Olli Kraus, Ruth Gottlieb and Sophie Sirota - String Quartet
- Adrian Bushby - Producer and Mixing
- Pete Gofton - Producer and Mixing
- Andy Carpenter - Producer and Mixing ("I Would Fix You")
- David Whittaker - Strings (1, 6, 8, 9, 12)
- Ruth Gottlieb - Strings ("I Would Fix You")
- Nick Edwards - Artwork

== B-sides ==
from "I Would Fix You"

- "Rough Boys and Modern Girls"
- "Packed In"
- "I Would Fix You (Mint Royale Remix)"
- "I Would Fix You (DJ Downfall mix)"

from "Stay in the Sun"

- "Hooray For Everything"
- "Save Your Kisses for Me" (Brotherhood of Man cover)
- "Stay in the Sun (Fridge Remix)"
- "Stay in the Sun (Maxwell Implosion Influenza remix)"
- "Stay in the Sun (Club Mix)" (Remixed by Xenomania)
- "Stay in the Sun (Club Instrumental)" (Remixed by Xenomania)
- "Stay in the Sun (Bangkok Ladyboy Mix)" (Remixed by Kat People)
- "Stay in the Sun (Bangkok Ladyboy Instrumental)" (Remixed by Kat People)

The main single version of "Stay In The Sun" is also a different mix from the album version, with prominent additional percussion and piano parts.
