= J Xaverre =

- Origin: Sunderland, Tyne and Wear, England
- Genres: Folktronica
- Years active: 2000–present
- Labels: Odeam; Moshi Moshi Music; Bambini; Memphis Industries
- Members: Pete Gofton; Lea Doherty; Jon Brooks

Founded in 2000, J Xaverre is an English folktronica artist from Sunderland, Tyne and Wear, England. Largely a solo creation by Pete Gofton, he has occasionally been joined by Lea Doherty (vocals) and the King of Woolworths member Jon Brooks (keyboards and production).

== History ==
Founded in 2000, J Xaveere is one of many aliases for the Sunderland-based multi-instrumentalist and producer Pete Gofton.

After his previous band Kenickie split in 1998, he got a solo publishing deal with Universal Records. He purchased some recording equipment, and began the first incarnation of his studio, Wang Computers. He produced bands such as Spraydog and Woodchuck, and the recordings of his ex-Kenickie bandmate (and sibling) Lauren Laverne.

He released his first single, a vinyl only seven inch, "Wild Weekend" / "Nilsong", in 2000, on Odeam, his flatmate's label. He then released two EPs (Bingo Wings and Skaterdater) in 2001 and 2002 on Moshi Moshi Records. The former attained single of the week status in the NME.

He signed to the Memphis Industries label, releasing several singles and an album, These Acid Stars, in 2003.

== Discography ==
=== Albums ===
- It's All True (2002)
- These Acid Stars (2003)

=== Singles and EPs ===
- "Wild Weekend" / "Nilsong" (2000)
- Bingo Wings EP (2001)
- Skaterdater EP (2002)
- "Saturday" (2003)
- "Great All Great" (2003)

=== Compilation albums ===
- We Love You...So Love Us Too (Wild Weekend) (2001)
- Beikoku Ongaku/Bambini Records (Saturday) (2002)
- Estuary English (Saturday) (2003)
- We Got Monkeys; 5 Years Of Moshi Moshi Records (Bingo Wings) (2004)
- The Memphis Family Album (Bingo Wings) (2006)
