= Dance-pop =

Music genre

- Other names: Club-pop; EDM-pop
- Stylistic origins: Bubblegum pop; pop; dance; disco; electropop; house; post-disco; synth-pop
- Cultural origins: Late 1970s to early 1980s, United States and United Kingdom
- Derivative forms: Diva house; eurobeat; vocal trance

Fusion genres
- Teen pop; house-pop; Italo disco

Other topics
- C-pop; disco-pop; Europop; J-pop; K-pop; Stock Aitken Waterman; list of artists

Dance-pop (also known as club-pop and EDM-pop) is a genre of electronic dance music that originated in the late 1970s to early 1980s. It is generally uptempo music intended for nightclubs with the intention of being danceable but also suitable for contemporary hit radio. Developing from a combination of dance and pop with influences of disco, post-disco and synth-pop, it is generally characterised by strong beats with easy, uncomplicated song structures which are generally more similar to pop music than the more free-form dance genre, with an emphasis on melody as well as catchy tunes. The genre, on the whole, tends to be producer-driven, despite some notable exceptions.

Dance-pop is highly eclectic, having borrowed influences from other genres, which varied by producers, artists and periods. Such include contemporary R&B, house, trance, techno, electropop, new jack swing, funk and pop rock.

Dance-pop is a popular mainstream style of music and there have been numerous artists and groups who perform in the genre. Notable artists include Ava Max, Backstreet Boys, Britney Spears, Carly Rae Jepsen, Christina Aguilera, Cher, Dua Lipa, Inna, Janet Jackson, Jennifer Lopez, Justin Bieber, Katy Perry, Kylie Minogue, Lady Gaga, Madonna, Michael Jackson, NSYNC, Paula Abdul, Rick Astley, Rihanna, Spice Girls, The Weeknd, Taylor Swift, Modern Talking and Years & Years.

== History ==
=== 1980s ===
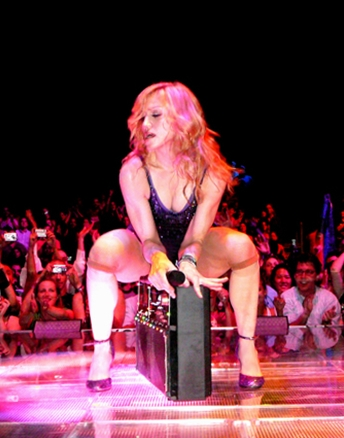
Madonna has been credited for popularizing dance-pop music, since her debut in the early-1980s.

As the term "disco" started to go out of fashion by the late 1970s to early 1980s, other terms were commonly used to describe disco-based music, such as "post-disco", "club", "dance" or "dance-pop" music. These genres were, in essence, a more modern variant of disco music known as post-disco, which tended to be more experimental, electronic as well as producer and DJ-driven, often using sequencers and synthesizers.

Dance-pop music emerged around the early 1980s as a combination of dance and pop, or post-disco, which was uptempo and simple, club-natured, producer-driven and catchy. Dance-pop was more uptempo and dancey than regular pop, yet more structured and less free-form than dance music, usually combining pop's easy structure and catchy tunes with dance's strong beat and uptempo nature. Dance-pop music was usually created, composed and produced by record producers who would then hire singers to perform the songs.

Since the beginning of the 1980s, disco was an anathema to mainstream pop. According to prominent AllMusic critic Stephen Thomas Erlewine, Madonna had a huge role in popularizing dance music as mainstream music, utilizing her charisma, chutzpah and sex appeal. Erlewine claimed that Madonna "launched dance-pop" and set the standard for the genre for the next two decades. As the primary songwriter on her self-titled debut album and a co-producer by her third record, Madonna's insistence on being involved in all creative aspects of her work was highly unusual for a female dance-pop vocalist at the time. The staff of Vice magazine stated that her debut album "drew the blueprint for future dance-pop."

In the 1980s, dance-pop was closely aligned to other uptempo electronic genres, such as Hi-NRG. Prominent producers in the 1980s included Stock, Aitken and Waterman, who created Hi-NRG/dance-pop for artists such as Kylie Minogue, Dead or Alive and Bananarama. During the decade, dance-pop borrowed influences from funk (e.g. Michael Jackson and Whitney Houston), new jack swing (e.g. Janet Jackson and Paula Abdul), and contemporary R&B.

Other prominent dance-pop artists and groups of the 1980s included the Pet Shop Boys, Mel and Kim, Samantha Fox, Debbie Gibson, and Tiffany.

=== 1990s ===
By the 1990s, dance-pop had become a major genre in popular music. Several dance-pop groups and artists emerged during the 1990s, such as the Spice Girls, Britney Spears, Christina Aguilera, Jessica Simpson, Backstreet Boys, and 'NSYNC. During the early 1990s, dance-pop borrowed influences from house music (e.g. Right Said Fred's "I'm Too Sexy", Taylor Dayne's Soul Dancing, and Madonna's "Vogue", "Rescue Me" and "Deeper and Deeper"), as well as contemporary R&B and new jack swing (e.g. Shanice's "I Love Your Smile").

By the late 1990s, electronic influences became evident in dance-pop music; Madonna's critically acclaimed and commercially successful album Ray of Light (1998) incorporated techno, trance and other forms of electronic dance music, bringing electronica into mainstream dance-pop. Additionally, also in 1998, Cher released a dance-pop song called "Believe" which made usage of a technological innovation of the time, Auto-Tune. An audio processor and a form of pitch modification software, Auto-Tune is commonly used as a way to correct pitch and to create special effects. Since the late 1990s, the use of Auto-Tune processing has become a common feature of dance-pop music.

Celine Dion also released a midtempo dance-pop song, "That's the Way It Is" by the end of 1999. Also during this period, some British bands connected with Britpop and alternative pop experimented with dance-pop as a form – examples include Catatonia single "Karaoke Queen," Bis's top 40 hit "Eurodisco", Kenickie's final single "Stay in the Sun" and Romo band Orlando's major-label debut single "Just For A Second." Another Britpop band, Theaudience was fronted by Sophie Ellis Bextor who went on to a successful solo career primarily in artist-driven dance-pop.

=== 2000s ===
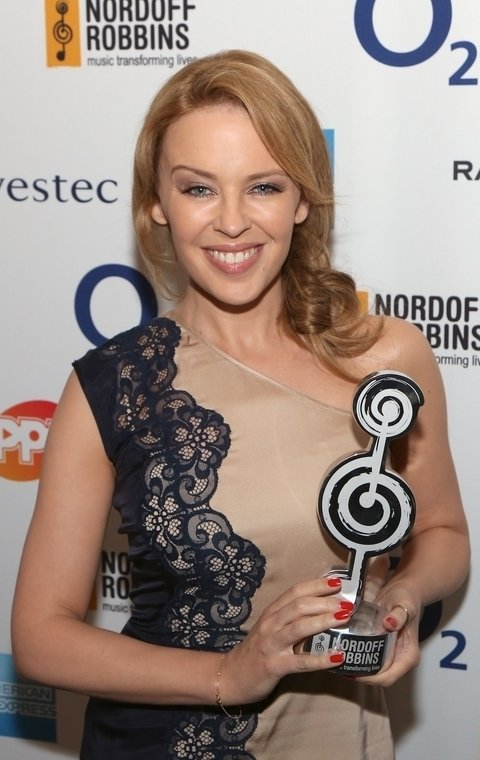
Kylie Minogue, a popular and successful dance-pop musician from the late-1980s until present

At the beginning of the 2000s, dance-pop music was still prominent, and highly electronic in style, influenced by genres such as trance, house, techno and electro. Nonetheless, as R&B and hip-hop became extremely popular from the early part of the decade onwards, dance-pop was often influenced by urban music. Dance-pop stars from the 1980s and 1990s such as Britney Spears, Christina Aguilera, Madonna, Janet Jackson and Kylie Minogue continued to achieve success at the beginning of the decade. Whilst much dance-pop at the time was R&B-influenced, many records started to return to their disco roots; Kylie Minogue's albums such as Light Years (2000) and Fever (2001) contained influences of disco music, or a new 21st-century version of the genre known as nu-disco; hit singles such as "Spinning Around" (2000) and "Can't Get You Out of My Head" (2001) also contained disco traces. In Madonna's case, her album Music (2000) contained elements of Euro disco, especially the successful eponymous lead single.

Nevertheless, it was not until the mid-to-latter part of the decade when dance-pop music returned greatly to its disco roots; this can be seen with Madonna's album Confessions on a Dance Floor (2005), which borrowed strong influences from the genre, especially from 1970s artists and bands such as ABBA, Giorgio Moroder, the Bee Gees and Donna Summer. Britney Spears' album Blackout (2007) contained influences of Euro disco.

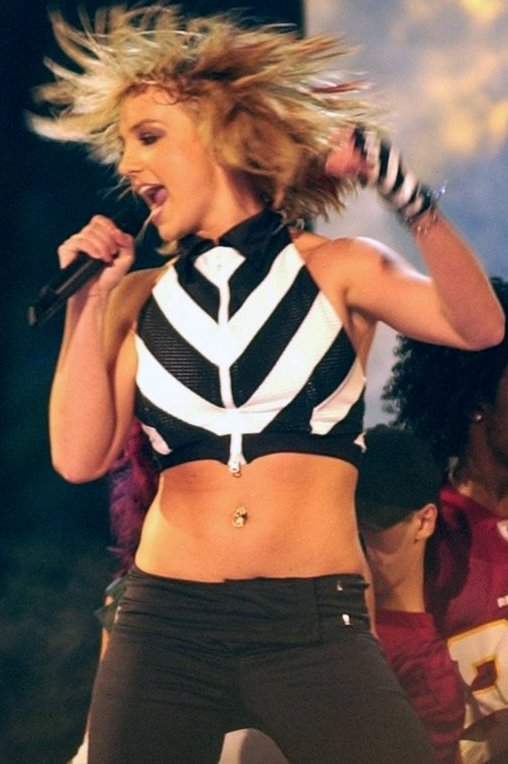
Britney Spears is among the main faces of the 2000s and 2010s dance-pop music.

The mid-to-late 2000s saw the arrival of several new dance-pop artists, including Rihanna, Kesha, Katy Perry and Lady Gaga. This period in time also saw dance-pop's return to its more electronic roots aside from its disco ones, with strong influences of synthpop and electropop. Lady Gaga is frequently considered one of the pioneers of this evolution, notably with her singles "Just Dance" and "Poker Face" which were heavily influenced by synthpop and electropop. Rihanna's singles in the dance-pop genre, including "Don't Stop the Music" and "Disturbia", contained electronic influences, the former of which has elements of house music, the latter electropop. Kesha's debut single, "Tik Tok", was also highly electronic in style and employed a video game beat. Katy Perry's "Hot N Cold" (2008), "California Gurls" (2010), and "Firework" (2010), which were major commercial hits, also showcased influences of electropop and house music.

=== 2010s ===
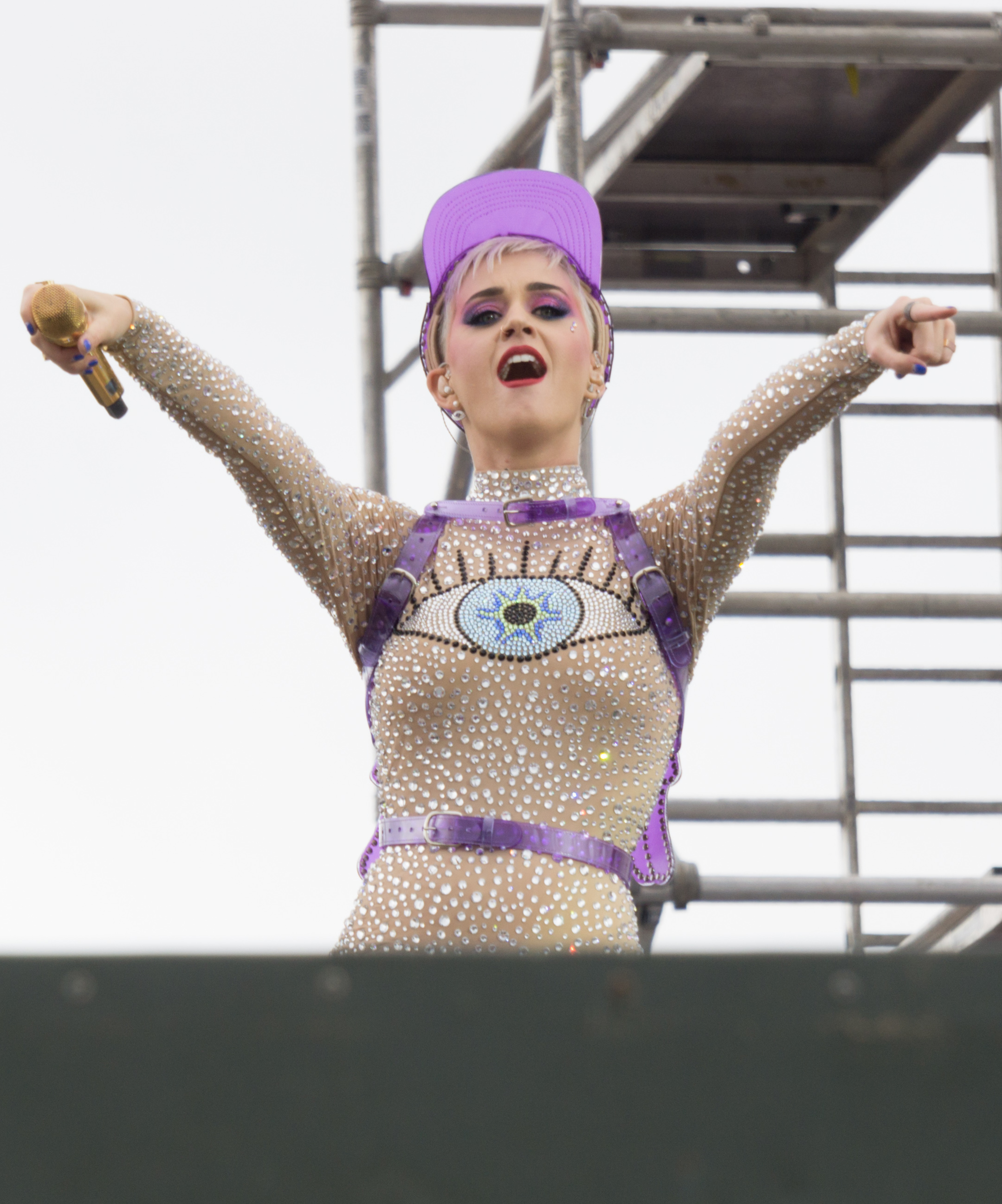
Katy Perry has been notable in dance-pop since the 2010s.

The 2010s, similarly to the late 2000s, saw strong electronic influences present within dance-pop; there is also a strong emphasis on bass-heavy drum beats. Artists such as Britney Spears, Lady Gaga, Taylor Swift, Katy Perry, Madonna, Kesha, Christina Aguilera, Usher and Rihanna remained very popular, while newer recording artists such as Ariana Grande, Justin Bieber, Rita Ora, and Dua Lipa joined the dance-pop charts within the decade.

Some music journalists noted the popularity of dance tracks, particularly those with narratives about clubbing and feeling positive during hard times, in pop music in the early 2010s. This was considered a response to the 2008 financial crisis or 2012 phenomenon, with the colloquial term "recession pop" used to define some of the popular songs of this decade.

American singer-songwriter Taylor Swift's albums Red (2012), 1989 (2014) and Reputation (2017) contain more of a pop-influenced sound, which features production by dance-pop record producers Max Martin and Shellback. Ariana Grande's single "Problem" featuring Iggy Azalea was a big hit in 2014 and reached combined sales and track-equivalent streams of 9 million units worldwide the following year.

=== 2020s ===
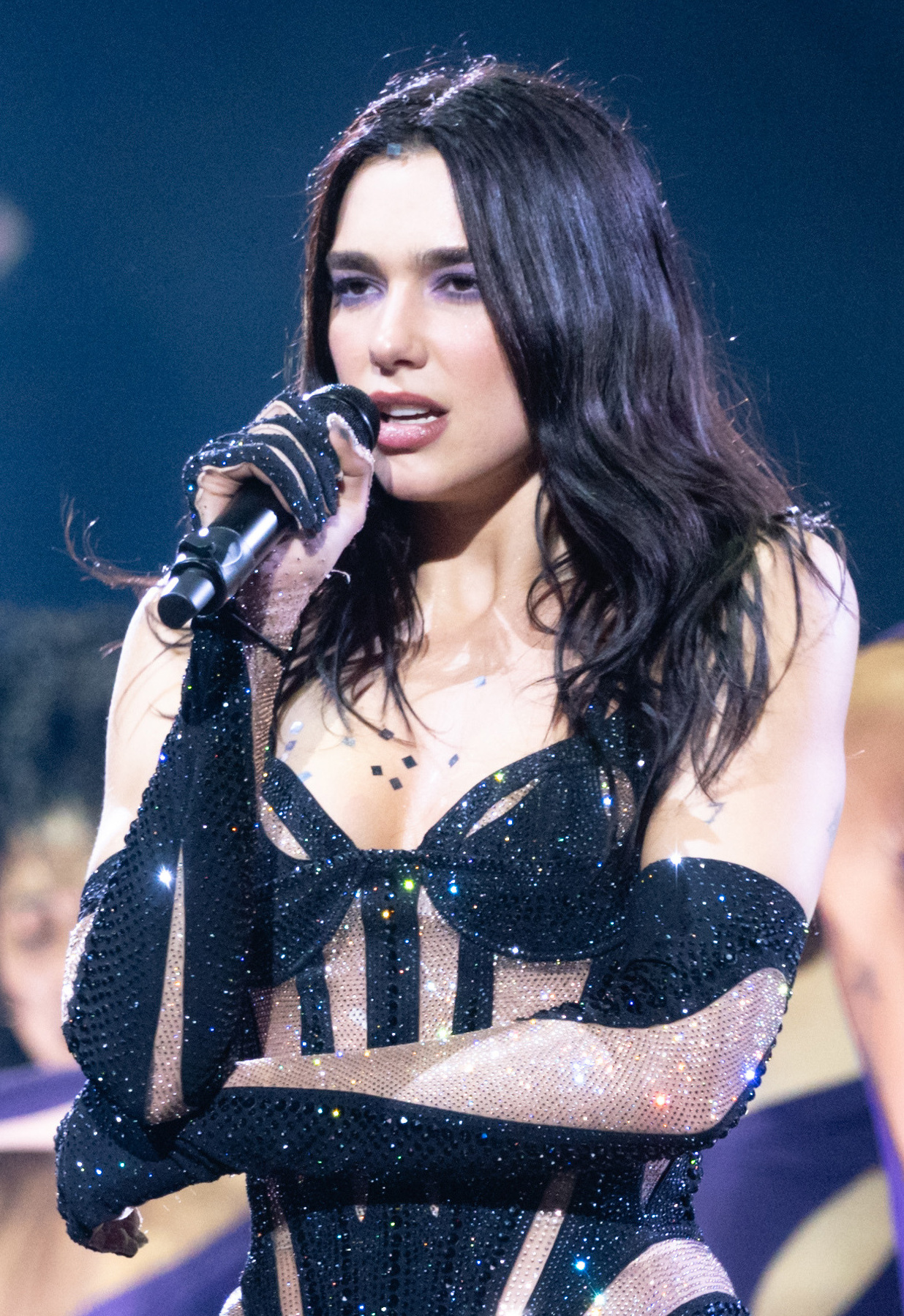
Dua Lipa's disco-influenced dance-pop music received critical acclaim and accolades in the 2020s.

The 2020s continued to see the evolution of dance-pop with an array of artists expanding the genre's boundaries while incorporating elements from diverse musical styles.

In 2020, Dua Lipa's album Future Nostalgia garnered significant acclaim for its fusion of disco, funk, and electro-pop. Hits like "Don't Start Now" and "Physical" channeled retro vibes while offering contemporary production, helping revive interest in the dance-pop genre. Lady Gaga also made a notable return to her dance-pop roots with the album Chromatica, which included collaborations with Ariana Grande ("Rain on Me") and Blackpink ("Sour Candy").

The influence of K-pop on dance-pop also grew in prominence. South Korean groups such as BTS and Blackpink achieved global success with songs that blended electronic dance beats with pop melodies. For instance, BTS's single "Dynamite" (2020) became a global hit, reaching number one on the Billboard Hot 100, showcasing how K-pop artists were successfully merging dance-pop elements into their music.

Doja Cat's Planet Her (2021) and The Weeknd's Dawn FM (2022) blended R&B with dance-pop and synth-pop elements, offering new interpretations of the genre.

Dua Lipa's follow-up album Radical Optimism (2024), featuring singles like "Training Season", "Houdini", and "Illusion", continued to push dance-pop boundaries by incorporating elements of house and disco while exploring themes of empowerment and growth. Similarly, Taylor Swift's albums Midnights (2022) and 1989 (Taylor's Version) (2023) showcased a continued embrace of synth-pop and dance-pop sensibilities.

In 2024, The Recording Academy introduced a new category, the Grammy Award for Best Pop Dance Recording, to honor the growing influence of dance-pop. The inaugural winner was Kylie Minogue for her single "Padam Padam", highlighting her continued influence in the genre.

The decade also saw a trend toward a more indie and alternative take on dance-pop, with artists like Rina Sawayama and Charli XCX blending hyperpop, electro-pop, and avant-pop elements into their music, as evident in albums like Sawayama (2020) and Crash (2022), respectively.

== Characteristics ==
Dance-pop generally contains several notable characteristics:

- Up-tempo and upbeat music that dance-oriented or dance-centered, characterized by a fast-paced and accelerated musical tempo with a nightclub-oriented appeal
- Catchy hooks accompanied with a readily comprehensible melody and memorable rhythm, while maintaining a fast-paced and energetic tempo and conforming to a commercially viable pop-oriented song structure catered and suitable for radio airplay and appeals to a mainstream audience.
- A strong emphasis on beats, grooves, and rhythmic pulse that are musically arranged within a rudimentary framework.
- Prominent hooks.
- Simple lyrics
- Polished productions

== See also ==
- List of dance-pop artists

== Print sources ==
- Kaplan, Arie (2012). American Pop: Hit Makers, Superstars, and Dance Revolutionaries. Twenty-First Century Book. ISBN 978-1467701488.
