= Rosita (band) =

English band

- Origin: London, England
- Genre: Alternative rock
- Years active: 1999–2001
- Labels: For Us; Fierce Panda; Grand Royal / Zubizaretta
- Spinoff of: Kenickie
- Past members: Marie Du Santiago; Emmy-Kate Montrose; Matt McGinn; Paddy Pulzer; Dot Allan

Rosita was an English band formed by Marie Du Santiago and Emmy-Kate Montrose, after their previous band Kenickie split in October 1998. Their second single, "Santa Poca's Dream" was a UK Independent Singles Chart Top 20 hit.

== History ==
Interviewed by Melody Maker after the final Kenickie gig and breakup, Du Santiago and Montrose announced their future plans, which included a clubnight (which would become Club Shimmy, on Soho's Gerrard Street) and some new music of their own.

The new band was unveiled in March 1999 with a line-up of Du Santiago on vocals and rhythm guitar, Montrose on vocals and bass, Dot Allan - live keyboardist for Kenickie - on keyboards, their former guitar technician Matt McGinn; and Paddy Pulzer, formerly of Swervedriver (and concurrently with Jack) on drums. They played their first gig at the Joiners in Southampton on 12 April.

The band released a debut single "Live It Down" on For Us Records in late summer.

They recorded a session of five songs (including the single) for BBC Radio 1's Evening Session programme hosted by Steve Lamacq, transmitted in late August 1999. They also contributed one track, "Sugar" on Fierce Panda compilation Otter Than July later that summer.

On 25 October 1999, Rosita performed live in concert on the Evening Session show from Liverpool's Royal Court Theatre, in a support slot for Cast as part of Radio 1's Sound City event. Rosita subsequently signed to Zubizaretta, a subsidiary of the Beastie Boys' Grand Royal record label. In April 2000, the label put out Rosita's second single, the Santa Poca's Dream EP, which hit No. 17 in the UK Indie singles chart. To promote the single, Rosita went on a seven date headline tour of the UK, supported by fellow Grand Royal artists Mika Bomb.

Following the collapse of Grand Royal in September 2001, Rosita announced their split.

Du Santiago later joined Tyne and Wear-based folk-inspired band The Cornshed Sisters, as Marie Nixon.

Montrose, as Emma Jackson, formed synth band The Pictures. She co-edited the journal The High Horse which ran for 10 editions from 2005 to 2007.

Matt McGinn, meanwhile, returned to his old employment as a guitar technician, eventually working for Coldplay. In 2010, Roadie, McGinn's memoir of his time working for Coldplay, was published by Anova Books' Portico imprint.

== Discography ==
=== Singles ===
- "Live It Down" (For Us, FU 009, 1999, 7" vinyl only)
1. "Live It Down"
2. "If You've Heard" (listed on sleeve as "If You've Not Heard")
- Santa Poca's Dream EP (Zubizaretta, ZUB006CD, 2000, CD & 7" vinyl) - No. 17 in UK Indie Singles Chart
1. "Santa Poca's Dream"
2. "Down Here"
3. "Demon" (instrumental)

=== Compilations ===
- Otter Than July (Fierce Panda, ning078cd/ning078, 1999, CD & 7" vinyl)
1. "Sugar"

(also contains tracks by Scribble, Fraff, Pop Threat, Hofman and Mo-Ho-Bish-O-Pi)

== BBC Radio sessions ==
- Evening Session with Steve Lamacq, Radio 1, recorded 3 August 1999
1. "Hey Hey Baby" (performed live on-air 3 August 1999)
2. "Santa Poca's Dream" (broadcast Monday 23 August 1999)
3. "This Is Tonight" (broadcast Tuesday 24 August 1999)
4. "Live It Down" (broadcast Wednesday 25 August 1999)
5. "Around The Town" (broadcast Thursday 26 August 1999)
- Acoustic Session live on Radio Jupitus, with Phill Jupitus GLR, summer 1999
1. "Sugar"
2. "Doing Fine" (a.k.a. "Around The Town")
- Evening Session Live in Concert on BBC Radio 1, 25 October 1999 from Royal Court Theatre, Liverpool, for Sound City event
1. "Sugar"
2. "Santa Poca's Dream"
3. "Maybe I'm Right"
4. "This Is Tonight"
