= Parson Barnard House =

Historic house in Massachusetts, United States

- U.S. National Register of Historic Places
- U.S. Historic district – Contributing property
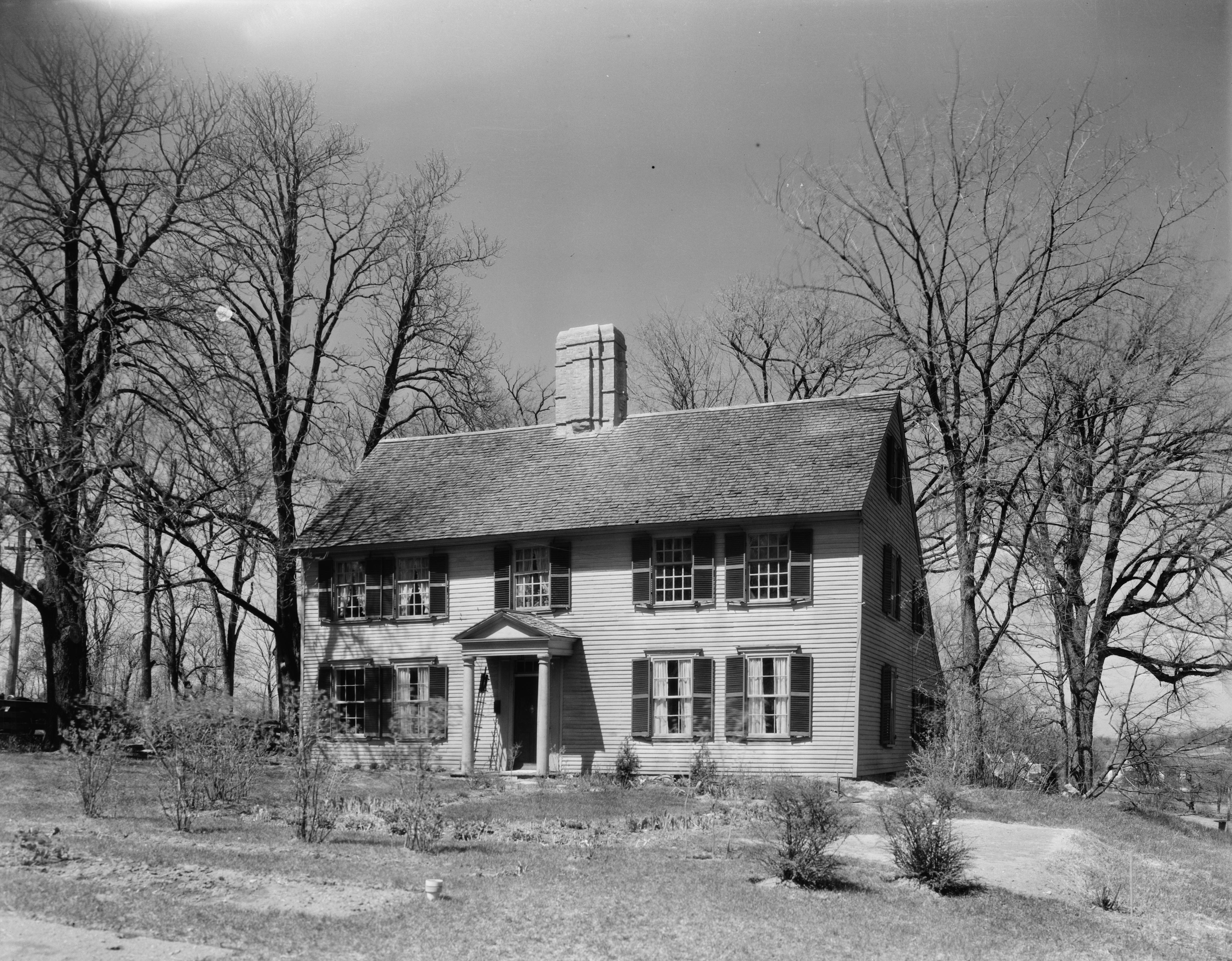
- HABS photo from the 1930s

- Location within Massachusetts Location within the United States
- Location: North Andover, Massachusetts
- Coordinates: 42°41′21″N 71°07′03″W
- Built: 1715
- Part of: North Andover Center Historic District (ID79000336)
- NRHP reference No.: 74000918

Significant dates
- Added to NRHP: September 6, 1974
- Designated CP: March 5, 1979

The Parson Barnard House is a historic late-First Period house at 179 Osgood Street in North Andover, Massachusetts. The 2 1/2-story wood-frame house was built in 1715 by Parson Thomas Barnard after his previous house burned down. The house is one of the most important First Period houses in New England, due to its unique, transitional features and excellent state of preservation. For many years it was believed to be the home of colonial governor Simon Bradstreet and his wife Anne.

The house was purchased in 1950 by the North Andover Historical Society, and is open for tours seasonally. The property also includes a late 18th-century carriage house. It was listed on the National Register of Historic Places in 1974, and included in the North Andover Center Historic District in 1979.

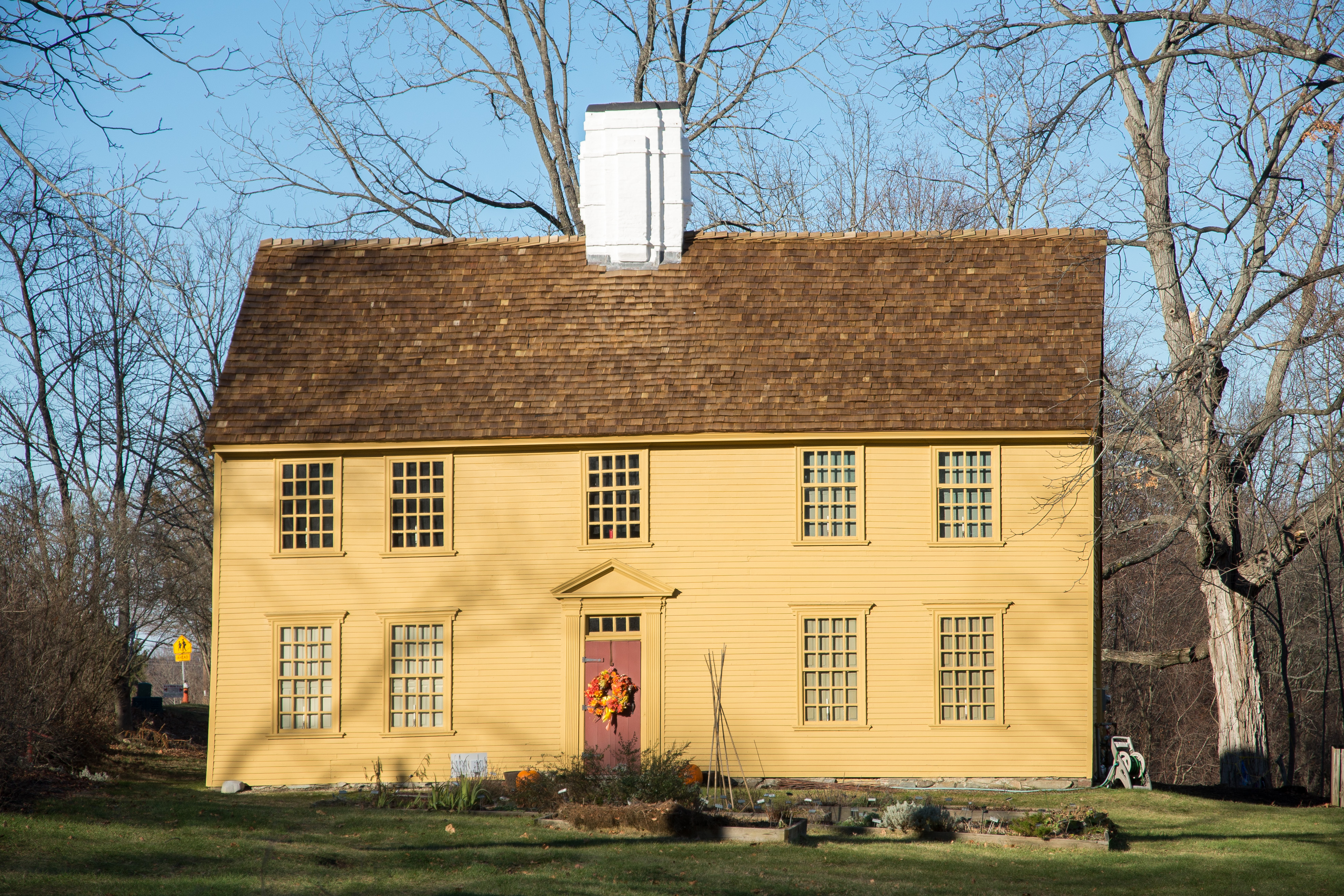
View of the house in 2014.

== See also ==
- National Register of Historic Places listings in Essex County, Massachusetts
- List of the oldest buildings in Massachusetts
