= Mo-Ho-Bish-O-Pi =

Welsh rock band

Background information
- Origin: Cardiff, Wales, UK
- Genres: Indie rock
- Years active: 1996–2002
- Labels: Soda; FF Vinyl; Seriously Groovy; V2 Records
- Members: Martin Bimrose; Richard Arnold; Mike Carter

Mo-Ho-Bish-O-Pi were a Welsh indie rock group formed in 1996. The trio included Martin Bimrose on guitar, Richard Arnold on drums and Mike Carter on bass. Formed in 1996 when the members were studying fine art at Cardiff University, the band has released material under various record labels, including Soda, FF Vinyl, and V2.

The band's sound was described by NME as being "as eclectic as their name is confusing". Likened to Beck, Sonic Youth and Pavement, Mo-Ho-Bish-O-Pi have been reported as being "closer to The Flaming Lips with overtones of Bis and ABBA". Their "punky garage" sound is evident on singles such as "Drop Jaw" and "Playboy", while a melancholic and perhaps more accessible side is demonstrated on "Names for Nameless Things".

The band's name is derived from Moho bishopi, the scientific name of the Moloka‘i ‘ō‘ō, an extinct bird known to have lived in Hawaii. Martin Bimrose saw an article about the bird in the Reader's Digest whilst waiting at the dentist's. He thought that with some imaginative punctuation, "the name could be as mad as he is".

Following the bands demise (the group has been inactive since 2002), Mike Carter and Richard Arnold went on to form The International Karate Plus but they have since also ceased to exist. Richard Arnold now plays in King Alexander, and Mike Carter was in Heck with former members of the Cardiff band, Sammo Hung, before they split in 2017.

== Discography ==
=== Albums ===
- Vague Us (10 September 2001)

=== Singles and EPs ===
- "Smoke Yourself Thin"/"Fingers For Eyes" (1999)
- Two Tier Water Skier (1999)
- Vitamin E(P) (31 January 2000)
- "Hear the Air" (19 June 2000)
- "Drop Jaw" (18 September 2000)
- "Playboy" (12 March 2001)
- "Names for Nameless Things" (21 May 2001)
- "Hear the Air" (3 September 2001)

=== Appearances on compilations ===
- "Kate is Cool" appears on Otter Than July; Double 7" Vinyl EP / Compilation CD EP from Fierce Panda (also contains tracks by Scribble, Fraff, Pop Threat, Hofman and Rosita)
- "Vacuum" appears on Sold As Scene; sampler compilation album from FF Vinyl (30 October 2000)
