= Kittredge (name) =

Kittredge is both a surname and a given name. Notable people with the name include:

Surname:

- Abbott Eliot Kittredge (1834–1912), American leader of the Presbyterian Church
- Alfred B. Kittredge (1861–1911), United States Senator from South Dakota
- Andrew Kittredge (born 1990), American baseball pitcher
- Beau Kittredge (born 1982), American ultimate Frisbee player
- Caitlin Kittredge (born 1984), American author and comic-book writer
- David Kittredge (born 1972), American film director, editor and screenwriter
- Elsie May Kittredge (1870–1954), American botanist
- George Lyman Kittredge (1860–1941), American professor of English literature
- George W. Kittredge (1805–1881), United States Representative from New Hampshire
- George William Kittredge (1918–2010), United States Navy submarine captain and personal submersible designer
- John W. Kittredge (born 1956), American lawyer and justice of the South Carolina Supreme Court
- Mabel Hyde Kittredge (1867–1955), American home economist and social worker
- Mac Kittredge, American politician
- Walter Kittredge (1834–1905), American musician, most notably during and about the American Civil War
- William Kittredge (1932–2020), American writer
- William A. Kittredge (1891–1945), American designer and author on design
- William C. Kittredge (1800–1869), American lawyer and politician in Vermont

Given name:

- Kittredge Cherry (born 1957), American writer
- Kittredge Haskins (1836–1916), United States Representative from Vermont

Middle name:

- Millicent Kittredge Blake (1822–1907), American educator in California
- Francis K. Shattuck (1824–1898), American civic leader in California
- Charles Kittredge True (1809–1878), American Methodist Episcopal clergyman, educator, and author
- Arthur K. Watson (1919–1974), American businessman and diplomat

Fictional characters:

- Kit Kittredge, a character from the American Girl franchise

== See also ==
- Kittridge
