= Spraydog =

- Origin: Newcastle upon Tyne, England
- Genre: Indie rock
- Label: various
- Members: Steve Robson; Maria Fontana; Phil Tyler; James Atkinson; Jonny Partington
- Website: http://www.spraydog.co.uk/

Spraydog are an English band that formed in 1994 in Chester-le-Street and Newcastle upon Tyne, England.

== Biography ==
Formed around 1994, Spraydog have released several studio albums, (4 on their own Ferric Mordant label), nine EPs on Beautiful Pigeon Records, and numerous singles and compilation contributions on a variety of independent labels including Fierce Panda, Stupidcat and Fortuna Pop! They have recorded two BBC Radio 1 sessions for DJ John Peel.

Spraydog kick-started their career touring with the band Kenickie and continue to play live both in their home town and occasionally elsewhere in the UK and Europe.

According to their MySpace profile, their musical influences include Pixies, My Bloody Valentine and Pavement. NME magazine described them in 2006 as "very great, scrummy lo-fi scuzz".

== Band members ==
The current line-up consists of:

- Steve Robson (vocals, guitar)
- Maria Fontana (vocals)
- Phil Tyler (guitar)
- James Atkinson (bass)
- Jonny Partington (drums)

== Discography ==
LPs

- Citrus Bitumen (1998)
- Lintered (2000)
- Mint Hand (2002)
- Lines Are Drawn Only by the Eye (2003)
- Karate Summer Camp (2006)
- Impress and Defend (2010)
- Anything Loud in Your Head (2025)

== Additional information ==
- Phil has a sideline as a folk duo performing shape note and early American folk songs.
- Chris Lanigan also plays drums in the current line-up of Milky Wimpshake and Phil frequently guests in the same band on fiddle.
- Maria Fontana played the dental nurse in the Royal Television Society award-winning 2002 short film Danny and His Amazing Teeth.
- A compilation album of early material, Lines Are Drawn Only By The Eye was released in the USA on Kittridge Records.
- The cover artwork of all Spraydog albums and the majority of their singles is by long-time Spraydog collaborator Sarah E Hall and Jason Gibbons.
- Acclaimed singer-songwriter and poet Neville Clay contributes the spoken-word part on the Spraydog track "Amaranth".
