= Slampt =

English record label

Slampt Underground Organisation
- Founded: 1992
- Defunct: 2000
- Genre: Punk, Riot grrrl
- Country of origin: United Kingdom

Slampt (also Slampt Underground Organisation) was a record label set up in Newcastle, England that ran from 1992 to 2000.

The label is perhaps best known for releasing Kenickie's debut EP. Slampt also released many riot grrrl-related groups such as Pussycat Trash, Golden Starlet, Petty Crime, Sally Skull and International Strike Force.

== History ==
The label was set up in 1992 by Rachel Holborow and Pete Dale. However, they preferred to call it an "arts umbrella" rather than a record label as such. They also produced a zine called Fast Connection.

Dale and Holborow were also behind several of label's acts. Released in 1992, catalogue number Slampt 02 was an album by minimalist duo Avocado Baby (that consisted of Dale and Holborow).

In 1995, they release the debut single by Kenickie; Catsuit City (Slampt 31, 7" vinyl).

Another Dale and Holborow project, Red Monkey, was released on Slampt from 1997 onwards. The band featured a more traditional jagged punk sound. The debut album, Make the Moment released in 1998, was also released on New Jersey label Troubleman Unlimited.

Slampt also released the debut single by The Yummy Fur in 1996. A band who later featured Paul Thomson and Alex Huntley a.k.a. Alex Kapranos, who later became the drummer and lead vocalist in Franz Ferdinand.

Slampt ceased to operate in 2000.

=== Post Slampt ===
Red Monkey survived the collapse of Slampt in 2000 releasing a third LP on Troubleman Unlimited in 2001.

In a Diskant interview, circa 2003, Dale said "If the bands that are around now in the North-East had been around three years ago when we stopped Slampt, we’d have carried on. Just at that time, there was nothing I wanted to release locally."

In 2012, Dale published the book Anyone Can Do It: Empowerment, Tradition and the Punk Underground.

In 2021, Dale published a paper about the record label, noting that he and Holborow believed in the concept of 'ephemerality' in punk culture.

Holborow still makes music in a two-piece group Do The Right Thing. Dale is still performing in his long-term outfit Milky Wimpshake.

== See also ==
- List of record labels
