= North Andover Center Historic District =

Historic district in Massachusetts, United States

- U.S. National Register of Historic Places
- U.S. Historic district
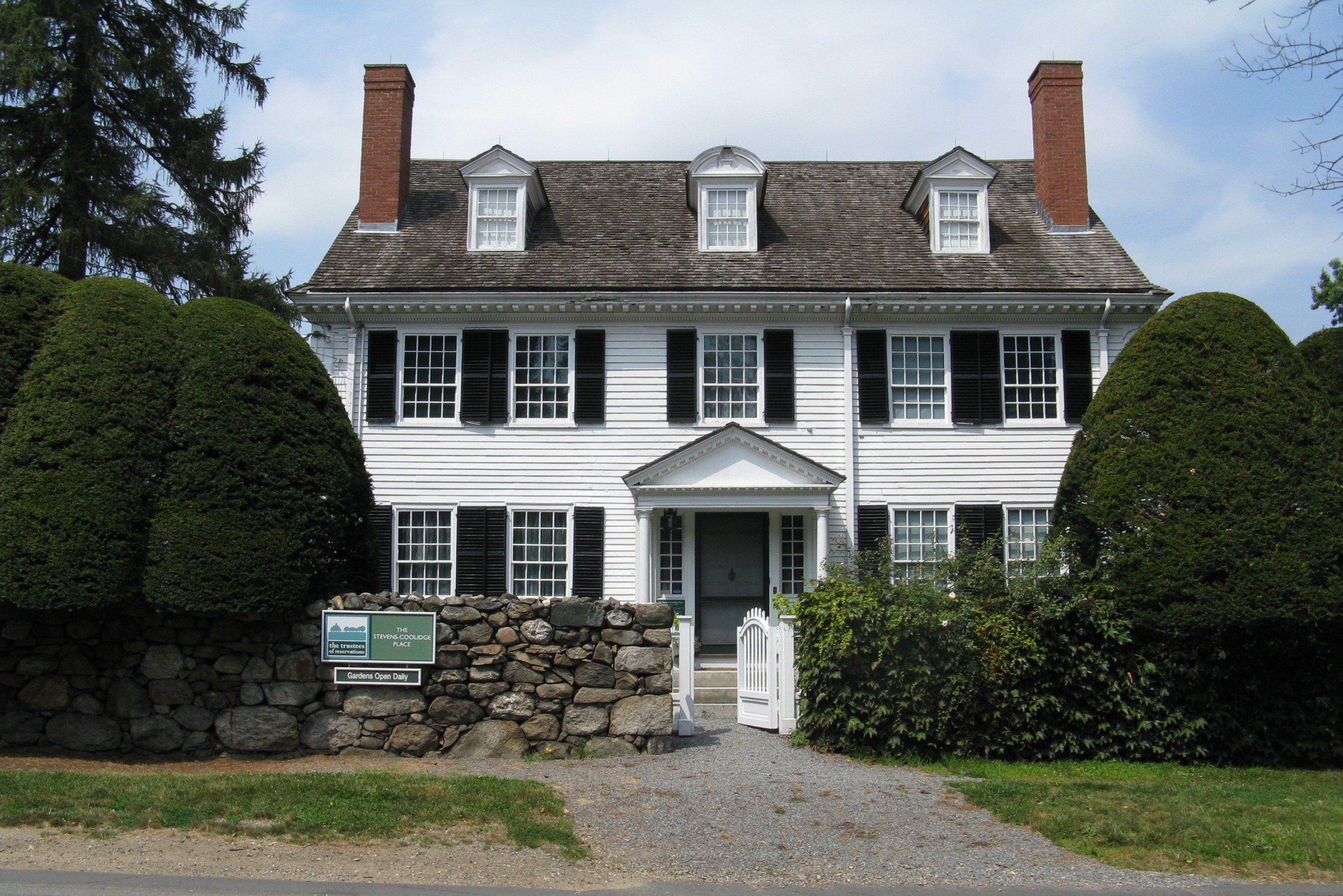
- Stevens-Coolidge Place

- Location within Massachusetts Location within the United States
- Location: North Andover, Massachusetts
- Coordinates: 42°41′15″N 71°6′55″W
- Architect: multiple
- Architectural style: Mid 19th Century Revival, Late Victorian, Federal
- NRHP reference No.: 79000336
- Added to NRHP: March 5, 1979

The North Andover Center Historic District encompasses the historic center of North Andover, Massachusetts, which was also the heart of neighboring Andover until the two towns split in 1855. The district is roughly bounded by Osgood, Pleasant, Stevens, Johnson, and Andover Streets and Wood Lane. It includes 75 properties, including the Parson Barnard House, and the Kittredge Mansion, the latter of which is built on land that included the town's original muster ground.

The district was listed on the National Register of Historic Places in 1979.

== See also ==
- National Register of Historic Places listings in Essex County, Massachusetts
- List of the oldest buildings in Massachusetts
