= At the Club (album) =

Studio album by Kenickie
- Released: 12 May 1997; 17 June 1997 (US)
- Genre: Britpop; pop punk; power pop; alternative rock
- Length: 50:41
- Label: EMIdisc (UK); Warner Bros. (US)
- Producer: John Cornfield, Andy Carpenter, Peter Gofton

Kenickie chronology
Skillex (1996)	At the Club (1997)	Get In (1998)

Singles from At the Club
- 1. "Punka" Released: September 1996; 2. "Millionaire Sweeper" Released: November 1996; 3. "In Your Car" Released: December 1996; 4. "Nightlife" Released: May 1997; 5. "Punka (re-release)" Released: July 1997

At the Club is the debut studio album by the British band Kenickie. It was released in 1997 and reached number nine on the UK Albums Chart. At the Club includes the singles "Punka", "Millionaire Sweeper", "In Your Car", "Nightlife" and "Come Out 2nite", the lead track from the group's second EP, Skillex. "How I Was Made" and an earlier stage of recording of "Acetone" also previously appeared on Skillex; the latter recording had also been used as part of an acoustic Peel Session in February 1996 and therefore appears on the band's BBC Peel Sessions CD.

The album was produced by John Cornfield, Andy Carpenter and band member Peter Gofton (Johnny X). Receiving good reviews, the album was first released by Bob Stanley and Pete Wiggs's label EMIdisc in the UK on CD, cassette and LP on 12 May 1997. The album was released the following month in the US by Warner Bros. with an additional two tracks. The front cover photograph was taken by Warren Du Preez.

== Critical reception ==
Professional ratings
Review scores
Source	Rating
AllMusic	4.5/5 stars
Entertainment Weekly	A
The Guardian	4/5 stars
Los Angeles Times	3/4 stars
NME	8/10
Q	3/5 stars
Rolling Stone	3.5/5 stars
Select	4/5
Vox	7/10
Wall of Sound	71/100

In 2017, Pitchfork listed At the Club as the 23rd-best Britpop album, with staff writer Jazz Monroe commenting that Kenickie's "synth-dappled guitar-pop was deceptively vulnerable, a strange cocktail of elation and deflation", and adding, "Their songwriting sketched an alternative to girl power's individualist rush: Instead of assuming an audience with the tools to empower itself, Kenickie showed hedonism to be a release valve, something fought for and snatched from the daily grind on scrappy nights out."

== Track listing ==
All tracks are written by Laverne and Du Santiago; except where indicated.

UK version
No.	Title	Writer(s)	Length
1.	"In Your Car"		3:45
2.	"People We Want"		3:25
3.	"Spies"		2:09
4.	"How I Was Made"		2:24
5.	"Brother John"		2:57
6.	"Millionaire Sweeper"		2:31
7.	"Robot Song"		4:39
8.	"Classy"		3:09
9.	"Punka"	Laverne, Johnny X	3:05
10.	"Nightlife"	Laverne, Du Santiago, Johnny X	3:19
11.	"P.V.C."	Laverne, Du Santiago, Montrose	2:25
12.	"Come Out 2Nite"		1:58
13.	"I Never Complain"		3:50
14.	"Acetone" (includes hidden track "Montrose Gimps It Up for Charity")		10:55

US version
No.	Title	Writer(s)	Length
1.	"In Your Car"		3:45
2.	"People We Want"		3:25
3.	"Spies"		2:09
4.	"How I Was Made"		2:24
5.	"Brother John"		2:57
6.	"Private Buchowski"		1:44
7.	"Millionaire Sweeper"		2:31
8.	"Robot Song"		4:39
9.	"Classy"		3:09
10.	"Punka"	Laverne, Johnny X	3:05
11.	"Nightlife"	Laverne, Du Santiago, Johnny X	3:19
12.	"Cowboy"		3:35
13.	"P.V.C."	Laverne, Du Santiago, Montrose	2:25
14.	"Come Out 2 Nite"		1:58
15.	"I Never Complain"		3:50
16.	"Acetone"		10:55
17.	"Montrose Gimps it up for Charity" (hidden track on the end of "Acetone")

== Personnel ==
Track numbering relates to the track listing of the UK release.

Kenickie

- Lauren - Lead Vocals, Guitar, Thigh slaps, Keyboards, Piano, Cello, Handclaps, Tambourine
- Marie - Lead Guitar, Vocals, Thigh slaps, Keyboards, Indian Bells, Handclaps
- Emmy-Kate - Bass, Vocals, Thigh slaps, Keyboards, Trumpet, Indian Bells, Handclaps
- Johnny X - Drums, Piano, Handclaps, Percussion, Lead Guitar (9)

Other personnel

- Ruth Thomas - Trumpet (5)
- Andy Carpenter - Producer (2, 5, 7, 10, 13), Engineer (4, 12, 14), Additional Production (4, 14)
- John Cornfield - Producer (1, 3, 6, 8, 10, 11, 13), Engineer (1, 3, 11), Mixing (6)
- Peter Gofton - Producer (2, 4, 5, 10, 12, 13, 14), Assistant Producer (1, 3, 8, 11), Assistant Engineer (1, 3, 8, 11)
- Darren Nash - Engineer (2, 5, 7, 11, 13)
- Sean Thompson - Engineer (1 to 5, 7, 8, 11, 13, 14)
- Adrian Bushby - Mixing (1 to 5, 7, 8, 11, 13, 14), Programming (7)
- Pete Davies - Assistant Programming (7)
- Clive Goddard - Engineer (10)
- Mike "Spike" Drake - Mixing (10)
- Warren Du Preez - Front Cover Photography
- Andy Phillips - Photography
- Martin Goodacre - Photography

== B-sides ==
from "Punka"

- "Drag Race"
- "Walrus"
- "Cowboy"

from "Millionaire Sweeper"

- "Kamikaze Annelids"
- "Perfect Plan 9t6"
- "Girl's Best Friend"

from "In Your Car"

- "Can I Take U 2 the Cinema?"
- "I'm an Agent" (Gary Numan cover)
- "Private Buchowski"
- "Killing Fantasy"

from "Nightlife"

- "JP"
- "Kenix"
- "Skateboard Song"
- "Eat the Angel"

from "Punka" (re-release)

- "Brighter Shade of Blue"
- "Lights Out in a Provincial Town"
- "Waste You"
- "We Can Dream"

- CD1 of this issue features the original single version of "Punka", CD2 the re-recorded album version.
