= Pete Gofton =

- Born: Peter Gofton; 26 September 1975 (age 50)
- Origin: Sunderland, Tyne and Wear, England
- Genres: Indie, folk, power pop
- Occupations: Musician, producer
- Instruments: Guitar, drums, keyboards, bass, vocals
- Years active: 1994–present

Peter Gofton (born 26 September 1975) is an English, Penge-based musician and record producer, who is well known on the music scene of the North East of England and has been involved with many artists either playing with them or producing. He is the former drummer and guitarist for Kenickie and former guitarist for Frankie & The Heartstrings.

== History ==
Gofton graduated with a degree in Sociology from Durham University in 1997.

As Johnny X, Gofton was drummer with Sunderland punk band Kenickie, formed in 1994 and disbanded in 1998, best known for the singles "Punka" and "In Your Car".

After Kenickie, Gofton worked under the name J Xaverre, described as "pop with knobs on", releasing These Acid Stars in 2003 on Memphis Industries after much critical acclaim. Gofton also found time to produce work by former Kenickie bandmate and sibling Lauren Laverne and bands such as Spraydog and Woodchuck.

A brief but popular stint as Meet Eric Roberts, alongside Maxïmo Park's Paul Smith, Field Music's Peter Brewis, and Jennie and the Bets' John Egdell (Caw Records) in 2006, led to current project George Washington Brown. George Washington Brown released the album On the Night Plain in 2007 with further material in the works.

Gofton contributed to the album, and was a touring member of The Week That Was, the new project of Field Music member Peter Brewis.

Gofton is an ex-guitarist with Frankie & The Heartstrings.

In 2012, Gofton began working at the North East Surrey College of Technology as a music technology teacher.

== Personal life ==
Gofton is the brother of Lauren Laverne, presenter of The Culture Show and Transmission. He has had many pseudonyms, such as Johnny X (as drummer in Kenickie), and then Pete X (guitarist in Kenickie circa Get In). The name J Xaverre stems from Kenickie's entry in The Great Indie Discography, which listed his supposed full name as "Johnny Xaverre" and furthermore claimed him to be the band's chief songwriter. (It has been suggested that this error stemmed from a misreading of the surname "Laverne" in the handwriting-style songwriters' credits on the CD booklet of Kenickie's first album At The Club.)

Originally thought to be pronounced to rhyme with 'fair' (one Metro article came with the punning headline "All The Fun of Xaverre"), Gofton has since confirmed that it is to be pronounced 'Xavier'.

He appears on the cover of the Field Music album Tones of Town, as a café patron seemingly. He made an appearance in the 2006 film Confetti as a member of Snoopy's band.

== Discography ==
=== Albums ===
- At the Club (as part of Kenickie) (1997)
- Get In (as part of Kenickie) (1998)
- It's All True (as J Xaverre) (2002)
- These Acid Stars (as J Xaverre) (2003)
- On The Night Plain (as George Washington Brown) (2007)
- Mini Album/title TBA (as George Washington Brown) (2009)
- Harmonograph (as The All Golden) (2018)

=== Singles ===
- Catsuit City EP (as part of Kenickie) (1995)
- Skillex EP (as part of Kenickie) (1995)
- "Punka" (as part of Kenickie) (1996)
- "Millionaire Sweeper" (as part of Kenickie) (1996)
- "In Your Car" (as part of Kenickie) (1997)
- "Nightlife" (as part of Kenickie) (1997)
- "Punka" (re-release) (as part of Kenickie) (1997)
- "I Would Fix You" (as part of Kenickie) (1998)
- "Stay in the Sun" (as part of Kenickie) (1998)
- "Wild Weekend"/"Nilsong" (as J Xaverre) (2000)
- Bingo Wings EP (as J Xaverre) (2001)
- Skaterdater EP (as J Xaverre) (2002)
- "Saturday" (2003)
- "Great All Great" (as J Xaverre) (2003)
- "Skip's Love Theme"/"Puget Sound" (Split w/ Le Danger) (2004)
- "Searching for the Now Volume 4" (Split w/ The School) (2009)

=== Compilations ===
- Signal Vs Noise (Walrus (demo)) (1994)
- Laugh Hard at the Absurdly Evil (Punka) (1995)
- Elastic Jet Mission (Rebel Assault) (1995)
- Camden Crawl (Gary II) (1995)
- Phoenix The Album (Come Out 2Nite (live)) (1997)
- Come Again ("It Started with a Kiss" (feat. Errol Brown)) (1997)
- The John Peel Sessions (2000)
- We Love You...So Love Us Too (Wild Weekend) (2001)
- Beikoku Ongaku/Bambini Records (Saturday) (2002)
- Estuary English (compilation)|Estuary English (Saturday) (2003)
- We Got Monkeys; 5 Years of Moshi Moshi Records (Bingo Wings) (2004)
- The Memphis Family Album (Bingo Wings) (2006)

=== As producer ===
- "In Your Car" (single) (Kenickie) (1996)
- At The Club (album) (Kenickie) (1997)
- Beggars Banquet (random compilation) ("I'm An Agent") (Kenickie) (1997)
- Get In (album) (Kenickie) (1998)
- Nings And Roundabouts (compilation) ("Come Out 2Nite") (Kenickie) (1999)
- Take These Flowers Away EP (Lauren Laverne) (2000)
- "These Acid Stars" (J Xaverre) (2003)
- "I Want You To Stay" (Field Music/J Xaverre Mix) (Maxïmo Park) (2006)
- On The Night Plain (album) (George Washington Brown) (2007)

=== Mixing ===
- "Criminals" (single) (Johnny Foreigner) (2009)
- "Custom Scenes" (album track) (Johnny Foreigner) (2009)

=== Remixes ===
- Ben Kweller – "Wasted And Ready" (2003)
- Mellow – "Drifting Out of Sight" (2004)
- Maxïmo Park – "I Want You To Stay" (with Field Music) (2006)
- Los Campesinos – "Death to Los Campesinos!" (2008)
- Sky Larkin – "Antibodies" (2009)
- Gaggle – "Crows" (2009)

== Filmography ==
- Confetti (2006)
