= List of dance-pop artists =

This is a list of notable dance-pop artists.

== 0–9 ==
- 1 Girl Nation
- 13 Stories
- 2 Unlimited
- 3OH!3

== A ==
- Aaliyah
- Paula Abdul
- Ace of Base
- Christina Aguilera
- Alcazar
- AlunaGeorge
- A-L-X
- Ambitious Lovers
- Anastacia
- Annie
- Aqua
- David Archuleta
- Tina Arena
- Army of Lovers
- Rick Astley
- Atomic Kitten
- The Attic
- Audio Playground
- Aurora
- Avicii
- Axé Bahia

== B ==
- B*Witched
- Backstreet Boys
- Bad Boys Blue
- Zoë Badwi
- Bananarama
- Banghra
- Azealia Banks
- Bardeux
- Basement Jaxx
- Bastille
- Daniel Bedingfield
- The Beloved
- Betty Who
- The Beu Sisters
- Beyoncé
- Justin Bieber
- The Black Eyed Peas
- Black Kids
- Blood Orange
- Bloodshy & Avant
- The Boomtang Boys
- La Bouche
- David Bowie
- Brazilian Girls
- Bronski Beat
- Chris Brown
- Havana Brown
- Emma Bunton

== C ==
- C+C Music Factory
- Can-linn
- Mariah Carey
- Caribou
- Dina Carroll
- Aaron Carter
- Cascada
- Cause and Effect
- Charli XCX
- Cher
- Neneh Cherry
- Choi Ye-na
- China Doll
- Ciara
- Classixx
- Clean Bandit
- Cobra Starship
- Kimberly Cole
- The Communards
- Company B
- Ida Corr
- The Cover Girls
- Taio Cruz
- Cut Copy

== D ==
- Da Pump
- Taylor Dayne
- DB Boulevard
- Dead Disco
- Dead or Alive
- Dee Dee
- Deee-Lite
- Delorean
- Kat DeLuna
- Destiny's Child
- Deuce
- Dev
- DHT
- Celine Dion
- Disclosure
- DJ BoBo
- DJ Encore
- Dubstar
- Hilary Duff

== E ==
- Stacy Earl
- East 17
- Eiffel 65
- Sophie Ellis-Bextor
- Empire of the Sun
- Jocelyn Enriquez
- Gloria Estefan
- Everything Everything
- Exposé

== F ==
- Sky Ferreira
- Fifth Harmony
- Five
- Flo Rida
- Foster the People
- Samantha Fox
- Frankie Goes to Hollywood
- Fun Factory

== G ==
- Debbie Gibson
- Girls Aloud
- globe
- The Go! Team
- Selena Gomez
- Wynter Gordon
- Gorillaz
- Ellie Goulding
- Ariana Grande
- David Guetta

== H ==
- Calvin Harris
- Her Majesty & the Wolves
- Paris Hilton
- Whitney Houston
- Hurts

== I ==
- Innosense

== J ==
- La Toya Jackson
- Janet Jackson
- Michael Jackson
- Samantha James
- Jewel
- Joée
- Joy
- Jump5
- Junior Senior
- Juvelen

== K ==
- Kesha
- Mary Kiani
- Natalia Kills
- Kim Hyun-jung
- King África
- Kisses
- The KLF
- Solange Knowles

== L ==
- Lady Gaga
- Laila
- George Lamond
- Jessy Lanza
- LCD Soundsystem
- Dua Lipa
- Lisa Lisa and Cult Jam
- LMFAO
- Locomía
- Jennifer Lopez
- Louie Louie
- Luciana

== M ==
- M People
- Madonna
- Maroon 5
- Lisa Matassa (as Lysa Lynn)
- Matt and Kim
- Ava Max
- Mel and Kim
- Javiera Mena
- M.I.A.
- Miami Sound Machine
- George Michael
- MiChi
- Mika
- Milli Vanilli
- Nicki Minaj
- Dannii Minogue
- Kylie Minogue
- Modern Talking
- Moloko
- Momoiro Clover Z
- Alanis Morissette
- m.o.v.e
- Movetron
- Samantha Mumba
- James Murphy
- Róisín Murphy

== N ==
- N-Trance
- Nabiha
- The Neptunes
- New Kids on the Block
- Olivia Newton-John
- Ne-Yo
- Nikkole
- NRG
- NSYNC

== O ==
- OFF
- Rita Ora
- Orchestral Manoeuvres in the Dark
- Emily Osment
- The Osmonds
- Donny Osmond

== P ==
- Kevin Paige
- Jane Paknia
- Paradiso Girls
- Sarina Paris
- Pebbles
- Katy Perry
- Paul Pesco
- Pet Shop Boys
- Pink
- Pizzicato Five
- Play
- Pnau
- Gabry Ponte
- Prima J
- Prince
- Private
- The Pussycat Dolls

== Q ==
- Cara Quici

== R ==
- Raze
- Richard X
- Ricki-Lee
- Right Said Fred
- Rihanna
- Robyn
- Rockell
- Bebe Rexha
- Kelly Rowland

== S ==
- S Club 7
- Marta Sánchez
- Santigold
- The Saturdays
- Seiko Matsuda
- Selena Gomez & the Scene
- September
- Shakira
- Shinee
- Shura
- Sia
- Jessica Simpson
- Troye Sivan
- Sam Smith
- Solid HarmoniE
- Tommy Sparks
- Britney Spears
- Speed
- Spice Girls
- Stacey Q
- Stakka Bo
- Alexandra Stan
- Lisa Stansfield
- Brenda K. Starr
- Gwen Stefani
- Steps
- Stevie B
- Stock Aitken Waterman
- Sugababes
- Donna Summer
- Linda Sundblad
- Swedish House Mafia
- Taylor Swift
- Sylvan Esso

== T ==
- T-ara
- T-Spoon
- Take That
- Tarkan
- t.A.T.u.
- Tegan and Sara
- Therese
- Tiësto
- Tiffany
- Timbaland
- Justin Timberlake
- The Ting Tings
- Katy Tiz
- Melissa Tkautz
- TLC
- Judy Torres
- Totally Enormous Extinct Dinosaurs
- Jolin Tsai

== U ==
- Usher

== V ==
- Vassy
- Vengaboys
- V*Enna
- The Very Best
- Vitamin C

== W ==
- Waii
- Wallpaper
- Jessie Ware
- Pete Waterman
- Jody Watley
- Wham!
- Karyn White
- Wild Orchid
- Will to Power
- Vanessa L. Williams
- Kimberly Wyatt

== X ==
- XLR8
- Xuxa

== Y ==
- Yazz
- Yelle
- Yuri

== Z ==
- Zedd
- ZOEgirl
