= Vague Us =

Studio album by Mo-Ho-Bish-O-Pi
- Released: 10 September 2001
- Genre: Indie rock
- Length: 38:08
- Label: V2
- Producer: Don Fleming

Professional ratings
Review scores
Source	Rating
The Independent	3/5 stars

Vague Us is a 2001 album by the Welsh indie rock band Mo-Ho-Bish-O-Pi. The album received generally positive reviews, with The Independent stating that "this trio's energy and diversity make for something that's really rather exciting". Fraser Middleton writes in the Glasgow Evening Times that "there is a glorious abandon to Mo-Ho-Bish-Op-Pi which is really refreshing. Vague Us sounds like the album the band desperately wanted to make, rather than on the record company or producer manipulated out of them".

== Track listing ==
1. Maverick
2. Vague Us
3. Fista Blista
4. Kids On Cake
5. Hear The Air
6. Drop Jaw
7. Over SeXXXed
8. E To C
9. Playboy
10. Moment To Soon
11. Push
12. Names (For Nameless Things)
13. All Your Health
14. Navel In A Suitcase
15. Harpers
