= Sam Baker (writer) =

British writer and editor

- Born: July 1966 (age 60); Hampshire, England
- Education: Birmingham University
- Occupations: CEO The Pool, editor and writer
- Partner: Jon Courtenay Grimwood
- Website: sambaker.co.uk

Sam Baker (born July 1966) is a British journalist, author, and broadcaster.

== Life and career ==
Baker was born in Hampshire, England, and studied politics at Birmingham University. She went on to work as a writer and editor for numerous British women's magazines, including Red, New Woman, Chat, and Take a Break. After re-launching teenage magazine Just Seventeen as J-17, she spent five years as editor of UK women's magazine Company, before resigning to write her first novel, Fashion Victim (described by Time as one of the five break-through first novels of the summer of 2005). Her second novel, This Year's Model, was published by Random House in the US, and Orion in the UK. Her third novel The Stepmothers Support Group was published by HarperCollins in 2009 (The Other Mothers Club / Avon / 2010 in the US). Her fourth novel, To My Best Friends, was published by Harper in May 2011.

Baker was the editor in chief of Cosmopolitan in the UK until December 2006. She then became editor in chief of Red, owned by Hachette, and a sister magazine to Elle. She resigned from Red in 2013, shortly after Hachette's magazines in the UK were acquired by Hearst. She took a year out researching the future of women's media, and launched the website The Pool in 2015, with co-founder Lauren Laverne.

The Pool was described by J. Walter Thompson intelligence at Cannes Lions 2015 as "A new vision of women's media that goes beyond the glossy." The website entered administration in January 2019.

In Spring 2016, she published The Woman Who Ran, a critically acclaimed reworking of Anne Brontë's 1848 novel The Tenant of Wildfell Hall, described by Marian Keyes as "Wildly gripping and unputdownable. This is a brilliant book."

Baker also broadcasts on young women's issues. In 2020, she launched a podcast called The Shift with Sam Baker, in which she talks with "a wide range of women in midlife and beyond about life, love, work, sex, identity, money, health, shoes, representation, vanishing eyebrows... whatever they feel like chatting about." According to The Guardian, "Baker has an anything-goes interview style as she nudges the women to be refreshingly frank and often angry in these much-needed conversations."

She lives in Winchester, Hampshire, and Paris with her partner, the novelist Jon Courtenay Grimwood.

== Works ==
- Baker, Sam (28 January 2016). The Woman Who Ran. HarperCollins. ISBN 9780007464357.
- Baker, Sam (1 May 2011). To My Best Friends. HarperCollins. ISBN 978-0007305544.
- Baker, Sam (1 September 2009). The Stepmothers Support Group. HarperCollins. ISBN 978-0007302550.
- Baker, Sam (6 March 2008). This Year's Model. Orion. ISBN 978-0752874265.
- Baker, Sam (31 May 2005). Fashion Victim. Ballantine Books. ISBN 978-0345475879.
