= Abbott Eliot Kittredge =

Abbott Eliot Kittredge (July 20, 1834 – December 17, 1912), best known as A. E. Kittredge, was an American leader of the Presbyterian Church.

Born in Roxbury, Massachusetts, Kittredge graduated from Williams College in 1854; taught in Wilton, Connecticut, for a year, and graduated from the Andover Theological Seminary in 1859. He was ordained on September 14, 1859, as pastor of the Winthrop church, Charlestown, where he remained until 1863; he then led the Howard St. Presbyterian church in San Francisco, California, 1864 and was pastor of the Eleventh Presbyterian church of New York City from 1865 to 1870, and then of the Third Presbyterian church of Chicago, Illinois, from 1870 to 1886. His work in presiding over the Chicago congregation attracted nationwide attention. He received the degree of Doctor of Divinity from Williams College in 1878.

In 1896 he returned to New York city to lead the Madison Avenue Reformed church, until 1896. He was relieved of work for a time on account of ill health, and later, after extended travel, he again assumed the responsibility of the services.

He was twice married, his first wife having died in the late 1870s, and was survived by his second wife and three daughters, including social worker Mabel Hyde Kittredge.
