= Lauren Laverne =

English radio DJ, and television presenter (born 1978)

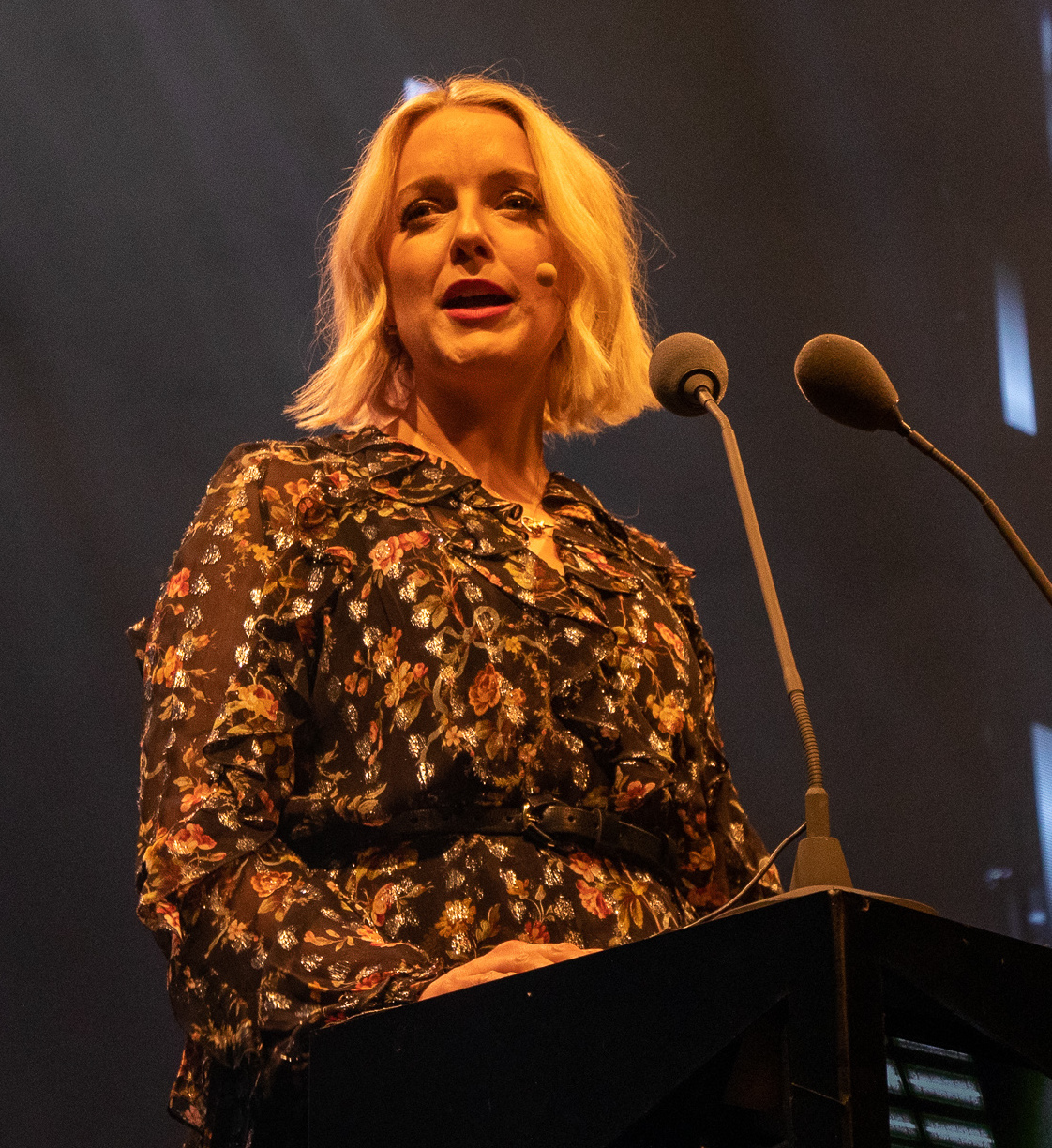
- Laverne speaking at the AIM Independent Music Awards in 2019
- Born: Lauren Cecilia Gofton; 28 April 1978 (age 48); Sunderland, England
- Education: City of Sunderland College
- Occupations: Disc jockey, broadcaster, singer, author
- Years active: 1994–present
- Television: The Culture Show; 10 O'Clock Live; The One Show
- Spouse: Graeme Fisher (m. 2005)
- Children: 2

Lauren Cecilia Fisher (née Gofton; born 28 April 1978), known professionally as Lauren Laverne, is an English radio and television presenter, author and singer. She was the lead singer and guitarist in the alternative rock band Kenickie.

The group's album At The Club reached the top 10, although her greatest chart success came when she performed vocals on Mint Royale's single "Don't Falter". Laverne has presented numerous television programmes, including 10 O'Clock Live for Channel 4, and The Culture Show and coverage of the Glastonbury Festival for the BBC. She has also written a published novel titled Candypop: Candy and the Broken Biscuits. She presents the late morning to lunch time show on BBC Radio 6 Music, and in 2018, became the host of the long-running radio show Desert Island Discs.

== Early life and education ==
Born Lauren Cecelia Gofton on 28 April 1978, she was brought up in Barnes, Sunderland, with her brother. Her father was one of nine and her mother was one of six. One grandfather had been a shipbuilder, the other a coalminer. Her father, Leslie Gofton, was a sociology lecturer at Newcastle University, having previously played guitar in a predecessor to Roxy Music, and her mother was a teacher.

== Career ==
=== Music ===
Lauren met future bandmates Marie Nixon and Emma Jackson at all-girl Catholic schools in Sunderland. They, with her brother, Peter, formed the band Kenickie, for which Lauren Gofton adopted the stage name "Lauren Le Laverne", later "Lauren Laverne", while still studying at City of Sunderland College.

The band put out an EP in 1995 on the local Slampt label; and then later signed with EMI, releasing four top 40 singles and two albums, the first of which made the top 10.

Kenickie dissolved in 1998. In 2000, Laverne released a solo EP, Take These Flowers Away, contributed a version of "In the Bleak Midwinter" to Xfm London's It's a Cool, Cool Christmas album, played at the Reading Festival, and made the top 20 for the only time in her singing career as vocalist on "Don't Falter" by Mint Royale. She was also working on a solo album at this time, but this was permanently put on hold by the collapse of Deceptive Records.

She subsequently provided guest vocals on the Divine Comedy's 2004 single "Come Home Billy Bird".

=== Television ===
During Kenickie's existence Laverne had started making television appearances, including as a panellist on Never Mind the Buzzcocks and by the time of their dissolution she was presenting Play UK's series The Alphabet Show. She subsequently presented Planet Pop and Loves Like A Dog for Channel 4, Fanorama for E4, Party in the Park with Melanie Brown and Pop for Five and Orange Playlist for ITV, as well as reporting for RI:SE, leading the house band on Johnny Vaughan Tonight and appearing as an expert in a music special of BBC One's Test the Nation. Later, she became one of BBC Two's main presenters for their coverage of the Glastonbury Festival and the host of ITV2's coverage of events such as the British Comedy Awards and the BRIT Awards.

She also presented a documentary for Sky One on the rise of popularity of the US hit TV Show Buffy the Vampire Slayer, called Buffy: Television With Bite. This aired when the show was returning for its sixth season in 2001.

In 2000, Laverne provided the voice of Shinobu in the BBC's one-off dub of Urusei Yatsura.

In 2003, Laverne was a regular team captain, along with Jason Byrne, on Elvis Has Left The Building, a comedy music panel show hosted by Colin Murphy for BBC Northern Ireland.

In 2004, she was a regular guest on the quiz show HeadJam. In 2005, she became host of ITV's Saturday morning music show CD:UK, along with Myleene Klass and Johny Pitts. The show finished in April 2006.

in April 2006, Laverne appeared as guest host of Never Mind the Buzzcocks. In August, she presented Channel 4's coverage of the V Festival. In March 2007, she presented the NME Awards live from the Hammersmith Palais.

In July 2007, Laverne appeared on the satirical comedy show Mock the Week, and on Have I Got News for You on 14 December that same year. She appeared on Never Mind the Buzzcocks on 10 January 2008, this time as a guest. In September 2008, Laverne appeared again on Mock the Week.

In March 2008, Laverne appeared on the Lily Allen and Friends show with fellow Sunderland musicians the Futureheads, and on Would I Lie to You?.

From 2006 to 2010, she was a regular presenter with the weekly BBC arts magazine programme The Culture Show, alongside Mark Kermode. She also presented the second series of the late-night Channel 4 music show Transmission with T-Mobile opposite Steve Jones.

Laverne replaced radio DJ Jo Whiley on the talent show Orange Mobile Act Unsigned, which searches for the top unsigned acts in the country.

Laverne became a regular presenter in the new "magazine" format third series of It's Not Easy Being Green, first broadcast on BBC Two in January 2009. She also narrated Tough Guy or Chicken? on BBC Three in August 2009.

On 6 May 2010, she was a co-host of Channel 4's Alternative Election Night, along with Jimmy Carr, David Mitchell and Charlie Brooker. Starting 20 January 2011, she re-joined her co-hosts on Channel 4's satirical news programme 10 O'Clock Live.

Laverne narrates the animated series Tee and Mo, as shown on the CBeebies channel.

In May 2022, the BBC announced that Laverne would be one of the guest presenters to take over Richard Osman's role on Pointless.

In August 2023, the BBC announced that Laverne would be joining as one of two additional co-presenters of The One Show, along with Roman Kemp.

Laverne also works as a TV commercial voiceover artist; as of 2022, she narrated commercials for the Automobile Association.

=== Radio ===
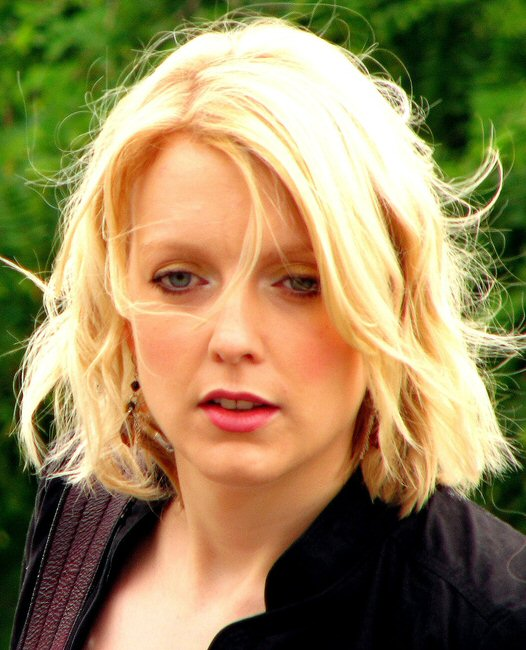
Laverne in 2007

Having previously sat in for BBC Radio 1's Steve Lamacq, Laverne joined Xfm London in 2002, co-hosting a Saturday morning show with Mark Webster, while occasionally standing in for various DJs on BBC Radio 6 Music, including Phill Jupitus' breakfast show where one morning she interviewed her own brother Pete (who records under the name J Xaverre) Laverne took over XFM's drivetime slot from Zoe Ball at the start of 2004, winning Best Newcomer at the Commercial Radio Awards in 2004.

She became host of the XFM breakfast show on 31 October 2005 after Christian O'Connell moved to Virgin Radio, but left suddenly in April 2007 to pursue her television interests. However, Laverne went on to guest present on BBC Radio 2.

Laverne joined BBC Radio 6 Music in June 2008 to present a Saturday weekend show before taking over the Monday to Friday morning (10:00 to 13:00) slot from George Lamb in November 2009. From January 2019, Laverne replaced Shaun Keaveny on the 6 Music Breakfast Show in a station schedule re-shuffle, which airs Monday – Friday, 07:30 to 10:30.

In 2014, Laverne guest-edited Woman's Hour on Radio 4, and in 2015 began hosting Late Night Woman's Hour, a spinoff series.

In September 2018, Laverne took over as host to Radio 4's Desert Island Discs when Kirsty Young took time off because of fibromyalgia treatment. It was later announced that Young would not be returning and Laverne would be her permanent replacement.

In June 2020, Laverne helped to launch m4d Radio, an internet radio station designed for people with dementia and their carers. As well as recording a welcome message for the radio station, Laverne spearheaded the station's #Song4You campaign, where celebrities and members of the public were encouraged to dedicate a song to someone they know who is affected by dementia.

=== Writing ===
In 2010, Laverne published her first novel Candypop– Candy and the Broken Biscuits, about rock chick Candy Caine, 15, on her journey to the world's biggest music festival, Glastonbury. The book is published by HarperCollins.

She was a columnist for The Guardian from 2012 to 2014, writing about style and British culture.

In April 2015, Laverne launched The Pool, an online platform aimed at women. The site was co-founded with writer and magazine editor Sam Baker and included features from Sali Hughes and Viv Groskop. The website also included regular podcasts and videos with Caitlin Moran. The platform entered administration in January 2019.

== Personal life ==
Laverne's mother, Celia Gofton, was elected a councillor for the Pallion ward in the City of Sunderland in 2006, and sought nomination as Labour candidate in 2008 in the Sunderland Central constituency but was defeated by Julie Elliott, who went on to win the seat for Labour in the 2010 general election. Her mother died in June 2022.

Laverne was raised as a Catholic, but also described her atheist father as an influence on her. In 2011, she said: "Once a Catholic... It's like the Mafia - you don't get to leave. I'm not sure I'd want to, but I'm incredibly angry with the Church at the moment."

Laverne is a supporter of Sunderland Football Club. In 2005, she became an ambassador for Sunderland, promoting and raising awareness of her home city. She received an honorary fellowship from the University of Sunderland in July 2009.

Laverne has been a vegetarian since the age of four.

In August 2024, Laverne stated that she had been diagnosed with cancer, but was expected to make a full recovery. On 24 November 2024, she announced that she had been given the "all clear" following treatment. In July 2026, Laverne was diagnosed with a blood and bone marrow disorder known as smouldering myeloma.

=== Politics ===
In late 1996, Laverne referred to the Spice Girls as "Tory scum" for their support for the Conservatives. This was before the 1997 general election.

== Discography ==
Solo singles

- Take These Flowers Away EP (did not chart)
1. "I Fell Out of a Tree"
2. "Good Morning Sunshine"
3. “Monkey Dance”
4. "To Have a Home"
5. "Some Kind of Other Presence"
6. "If You Phone (Netmix)" (internet only bonus track)

Other solo releases

- "Don't Falter", Mint Royale featuring Lauren Laverne, No. 15 (w/b 31 January 2000) Also released on parent album On the Ropes
- "In the Bleak Midwinter" (on It's A Cool Cool Christmas compilation) (did not chart)
- "Come Home Billy Bird", the Divine Comedy (uncredited vocalist), No. 24 (w/b 28 March 2004) Also released on parent album Absent Friends

=== BBC Radio sessions ===
Evening Session, BBC Radio 1, August 2000

- "Don't Falter" (rock version)
- "Mexico"
- "Thank You"
- To Have A Home

Air, BBC Radio Scotland, December 2000

- "Ian"
- "Open"
