= Kenickie =

British rock band

- Origin: Sunderland, England
- Genres: Britpop, alternative rock, pop punk, power pop, indie pop
- Years active: 1994–1998
- Labels: Slampt, Fierce Panda, EMIdisc, Warner Bros.
- Spinoffs: Rosita
- Past members: Lauren Laverne; Marie Du Santiago; Emmy-Kate Montrose; Johnny X

Kenickie were an English four-piece pop punk band from Sunderland. The band was formed in 1994 and consisted of lead vocalist, guitarist, and lyricist Lauren Laverne, drummer Johnny X (Lauren's brother), lead guitarist and occasional lead vocalist Marie Du Santiago and bass guitarist Emmy-Kate Montrose. After becoming John Peel favourites and releasing two EPs in 1995 and 1996, they released two albums, At the Club and Get In, before breaking up in 1998.

== History ==
=== Origin and EPs ===
Lauren Gofton, Marie Nixon, and Emma Jackson all met as schoolchildren in Sunderland in north east England. By early 1994 Lauren and her older brother, Pete Gofton, were bass player and drummer in a band Muchos Gratsias, (Note: Spelling varies in sources; this article follows Mackay.) featuring Spraydog frontman Steve Robson on vocals, while Marie played guitar in another band featuring Pete as drummer, Bone. Lauren, Marie and Emma devised a concept for a band, taking the name Kenickie from a character in Grease, and recruited Lauren's brother as drummer.

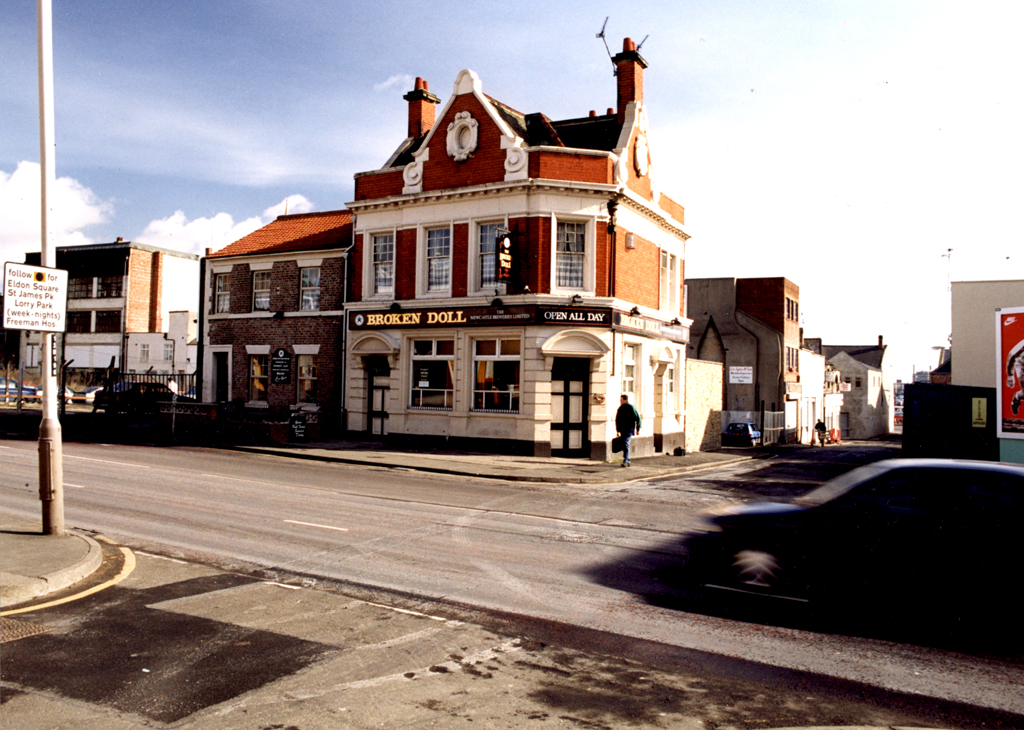
The Broken Doll pub in Newcastle, the site of the band's first gig.

At a local show, Lauren took over vocals on a cover of "Speeding Motorcycle" by Daniel Johnston and was subsequently approached by local riot grrrl-aligned record label Slampt. She mentioned Kenickie, who were booked for an upcoming show. The four quickly rehearsed a set of songs written by Lauren and Marie, and performed their first gig at the Broken Doll in the nearby Newcastle upon Tyne in September, supporting The Yummy Fur and Pussycat Trash.

The band developed glam stage personas, described by Rhian E. Jones as "pantomime versions of themselves", drawing links to the aesthetics of the Manic Street Preachers and Courtney Love. They took the stage names of Lauren Laverne, (Note: Originally "Lauren Le Laverne") Marie Du Santiago, Emmy-Kate Montrose and Johnny X.

Kenickie recorded several demo tapes, Uglification, The Janet Ellis Conspiracy and Glamour for the Criminally Insane, and Return to Shrimp Valley and contributed the track "Rebel Assault" to Slampt's Elastic Jet Mission, before then releasing a debut EP in 1995, Catsuit City, on Slampt. This reviewed well and resulted in a Peel Session, which was transmitted in July 1995. The session featured the songs "Drag Race", "Millionaire Sweeper", "PVC" and "How I Was Made".

They played the In the City music convention in Manchester in September 1995, and then played dates in London in November, including the first Camden Crawl, while they sought a record deal. The band opened the bill for the Ramones' final UK appearance, at London's Brixton Academy on 3 February 1996.

Kenickie declined an offer by Alan McGee to sign to Creation, and instead their next release was the Skillex EP, on Fierce Panda, in February 1996, after what the label's boss describes as a "tip-off" from a contact at Creation. This EP was recorded at Sam's Studios in Newcastle with Pete as producer, and featured "How I Was Made" and "Come Out 2Nite", the latter mixing "glammy lo-fi punk" with "girl-group harmonies". A CD edition of Skillex, with two additional tracks, "Scared of Spiders" and "Acetone", was released in May.

The band's attempts to engage with the mainstream record industry were disapproved of by Pete Dale and Rachel Holborow of Slampt, who released a split tape featuring Muchos Gratsias under the name Fuck Sell-Outs up the Arse!; while Kenickie demanded that Slampt allow Catsuit City to go out of print. Interviewed in Melody Maker to promote the launch of Skillex, Kenickie compared Dale and Holborow's punk ethos to missionaries teaching Africans to play cricket and made a claim about the funding of Slampt that had to be corrected in a later issue.

=== At the Club ===
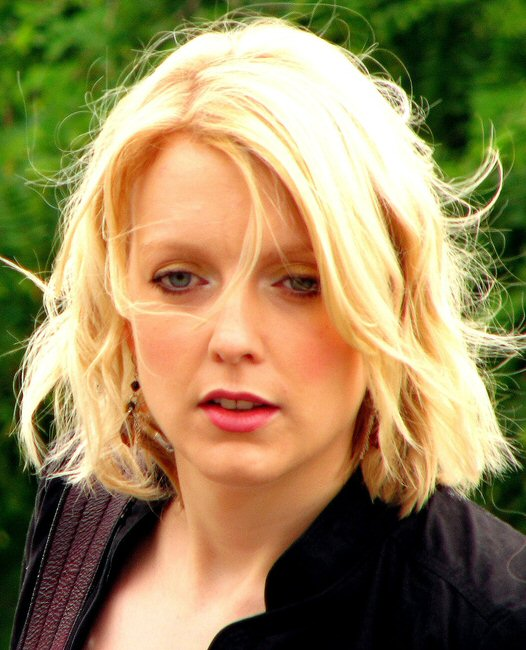
Lauren Laverne in 2007

They ultimately signed to EMIdisc, a new imprint of EMI headed by Bob Stanley and Pete Wiggs of the band Saint Etienne and, having finished their A-levels that summer, moved to London. They recorded tracks for their debut album at Sawmills Studios in Cornwall with John Cornfield and at Moles in Bath with Andy Carpenter.

Their first EMI single would be "Punka" (September 1996), a song that hit back at the attitude of the north-eastern lo-fi scene; it reached No. 43 on the UK Singles Chart, and was followed by "Millionaire Sweeper" in December (No. 60), and then their first top 40, and highest-charting song, "In Your Car" in January 1997. Promotion for this included opening Top of the Pops on 10 January 1997.

Kenickie took the first and fourth place of John Peel's 1996 Festive Fifty with "Come Out 2Nite" and "Punka".

In late April the band released another single, "Nightlife", sung by Marie, which again hit the top 30, netting them a second appearance on Top of the Pops; and played the Highbury Garage, with Gorky's Zygotic Mynci and Mogwai, in a show that was hosted by Steve Lamacq and broadcast live on BBC Radio 1.

At the Club was released in May 1997, and entered the charts at No. 9. Notices were favourable — NME gave the album 8/10 stars, and described it as a "ridiculously confident" album featuring "spiky punk-pop scrongling" - but the band faced sexualised reviews and interviews, and refused an offer to be placed on the NME front cover if they "got naked and painted [themselves] gold". Emma wrote later in a piece about her experiences in the band that their call and response banter had developed partly because of catcalling at gigs.

The album was released in the United States on Warner Brothers on 17 June, and the band undertook a short promotional tour, including gigs at the Mercury Lounge in New York and the Troubadour in Los Angeles.

After meeting them, Courtney Love said:

They're a big bunch of sex, that band Kenickie. They're a big, raw-boned bunch of fucking sex — all three of them and the boy. I hope they get good. I hope we're a good example to them, I hope this record's huge and then the big labels will start sniffing around and then those big fucking raw-boned sexy Newcastle [sic] girls will be huge and have Number Ones and there will be an Amazon planet the way I want it.

A planned set on the Other Stage at Glastonbury in late June was cancelled after heavy rain resulted in the stage sinking into mud.

The final single from the album was a re-release of "Punka", in July 1997, this time achieving a position of No. 38. A planned return visit to the United States, touring with Bis, had to be cancelled due to illness within the band, but they were able to play the Reading Festival at the end of August.

=== Second album and breakup ===
For the second album, Johnny X, now using 'Pete X' as his stage name, moved to guitar to replace Lauren, who focused on vocals, with the live band augmented by Graham Christie (later of Data Panik) on drums and Dot Allen on keyboards.

The album was recorded at Strongroom Studios in London, and produced by Pete and Adrian Bushby, with one track, "I Would Fix You", being also produced by Andy Carpenter, and featuring additional recording at Wessex Matrix. The album, Get In, was announced in December 1997 for March 1998, with the band apologising for pulling out of a gig at the Electric Ballroom that month due to the sessions.

The band played Glastonbury at the end of June, and released two singles over the summer, "I Would Fix You" (June, No. 36) and "Stay in the Sun" (August, No. 43).

Get In was markedly different in tone - the Sunday Express described the album as "slower and sadder without losing an iota of their considerable charm", and the NME wrote that "If last year's debut, At the Club, was a giggly blur of fake-fur and spilt vodka, then this is morning after, shivering at dawn with bad skin, a chemical warhead hangover and a clutch of inexplicable bruises." It achieved a first-week chart position of No. 32 upon its release in September 1998.

A documentary made for Tyne Tees followed Kenickie's last tour in October 1998, describing ticket sales as "slow" and saying that it was apparent that the album had sold poorly. The documentary interviewed fans, including a young Kieron Gillen, who said of rumours surrounding the band:

It's a tragedy - but [with] the state of the music industry at the moment, they're going to get dropped if they don't, so it's better if they actually quit now and just jump out.

After a final show at the London Astoria on 15 October 1998, described as "rather messy" by Music Week, Lauren announced on stage "We were Kenickie ... a bunch of fuckwits". The band confirmed the breakup to the music press soon thereafter.

== After Kenickie ==
Lauren and Pete announced they would be making music together as "Chris", and returned to Sunderland. Lauren contributed vocals to Mint Royale's single "Don't Falter" in 2000, which reached No. 15 in the UK singles chart. She released a solo EP, produced by Pete, Take These Flowers Away on Deceptive in August 2000. She is now a television and radio presenter for the BBC.

Marie and Emma stayed in London, started clubnight Shimmy in Gerrard Street and formed a new band called Rosita. Rosita released two singles before splitting up in September 2001.

Emma formed synth trio The Pictures, and Marie later played in the folk-inspired band The Cornshed Sisters. Pete went on to record under the name J Xaverre. He toured with Peter Brewis of Field Music's new project The Week That Was and later played in Frankie & The Heartstrings.

The band's onetime touring keyboard player Tony O'Neill (known in the band as Elvis Wesley) is now an author, living in the United States.

== Legacy ==
The music press identified Kenickie as part of or figureheads for a movement including fellow teens Bis, as well as fellow northerners Angelica, Cheetara (who covered "Come Out 2Nite"), Disco Pistol, Gel, Midget, Period Pains and Vyvyan, some of whom were even younger than Kenickie.

Writing for The F-Word, Cazz Blase drew a possible link between Kenickie's style, and a new industry-launched "spate of girl bands with guitars", including 21st Century Girls, Hepburn and Thunderbugs.

Lauren Laverne has said there will not be a Kenickie reunion. A compilation, The Peel Sessions, was released in 1999. Get In was reissued in 2012, with the B-sides from that album's singles included as bonus tracks.

Kenickie were honoured with a place on the Sunderland Music Wall of Fame in 2026.

== Discography ==
=== Studio albums ===
- At the Club (Emidisc 1997) UK No. 9
- Get In (EMI 1998) UK No. 32

=== Radio sessions album ===
- The John Peel Sessions (1999, Strange Fruit Records)

=== Singles/EPs ===
- Catsuit City EP vinyl (Slampt Records 1995)
- Skillex EP (vinyl two tracks, Fierce Panda 1995; CD four tracks, Fierce Panda 1996)
- "Punka" (CD Emidisc 1996) UK No. 43
- "Millionaire Sweeper" (CD Emidisc 1996) UK No. 60
- "In Your Car" (two CDs Emidisc 1997) UK No. 24
- "Nightlife" (two CDs Emidisc 1997) UK No. 27
- "Punka" revised edition (two CDs Emidisc 1997) UK No. 38
- "I Would Fix You" (two CDs EMI 1998) UK No. 36
- "Stay in the Sun" (two CDs EMI 1998) UK No. 43

=== Compilation appearances ===
- "Walrus" demo - Signal vs Noise CD (1994)
- "Hey, Punka" demo - Laugh Hard at the Absurdly Evil (1995)
- "Rebel Assault" - Elastic Jet Mission LP, Slampt (1995)
- "Gary 2" - The Camden Crawl CD, Love Train (1995)
- "My Nites Out" - And the Rest Is History CD, Xerox (1996)
- "Come Out 2Nite" - Phoenix - The Album CD, New Millenium Communications (1997)
- "I'm an Agent" - Random - Gary Numan tribute CD (1997)
- "It Started with a Kiss" - Come Again CD, EMI (1997)

== Videography ==
Year	Song	Director
1996	"Punka" (UK video)	
1996	"Millionaire Sweeper"	
1997	"In Your Car" (UK video)	Björn Lindgren
1997	"Nightlife"	
1997	"In Your Car" (US video)	Dani Jacobs
1997	"Punka" (US video)	Dani Jacobs
1998	"I Would Fix You"	
1998	"Stay in the Sun"	
