= Kittredge Mansion =

Historic house in Massachusetts, United States

- U.S. National Register of Historic Places
- U.S. Historic district – Contributing property
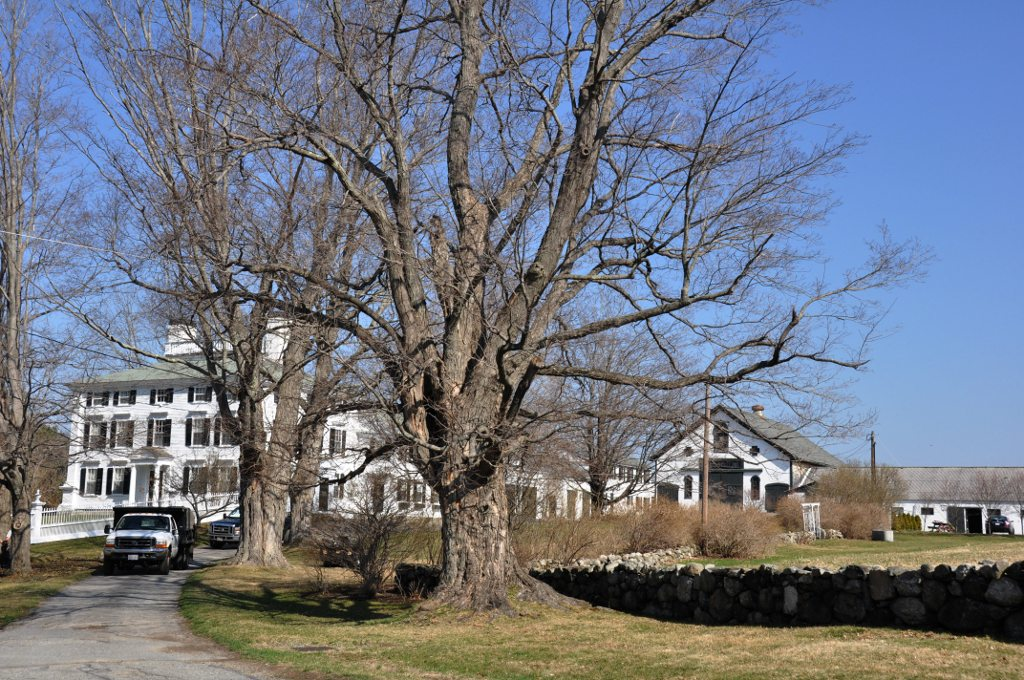

- Location within Massachusetts Location within the United States
- Location: 56 Academy Rd., North Andover, Massachusetts
- Coordinates: 42°41′26″N 71°6′51″W
- Area: 45 acres (18 ha)
- Built: 1784
- Architectural style: Federal
- Part of: North Andover Center Historic District (ID79000336)
- NRHP reference No.: 76000282

Significant dates
- Added to NRHP: December 12, 1976
- Designated CP: March 5, 1979

The Kittredge Mansion is a historic house in North Andover, Massachusetts. This three story wood-frame house was built in 1784 for Joseph Kittredge, and has remained in the family. Its construction and design have been attributed to noted Salem, Massachusetts builder Samuel McIntire. The house was listed on the National Register of Historic Places in 1976, and included in the North Andover Center Historic District in 1979.

== Description and history ==
The Kittredge Mansion is located in a rural suburban area east of North Andover's town center, on the north side of Academy Road just east of its junction with Court Street. It is set on about 45 acres (18 ha) of land, with the main house near the southern end. The house is a large three-story wood-frame structure, with a clapboarded exterior and hip roof. The roof is truncated at the center by a flat section surrounded by a balustrade. The main block is five bays wide and three deep, with a center entrance on the front facade, sheltered by an enclosed vestibule with pedimented gable. The third floor windows are half-height, a design seen in period mansion houses in Salem. The building corners have wide fluted Doric pilasters that taper as they rise to a moulded cornice. The interior follows a center hall plan, with a fine staircase in the main hall, with a particularly fine fireplace surround in the southwest parlor. A series of ells project to the rear of the house, and a mid-19th century barn with Gothic features stands just to its right.

The house was built in 1784 for Doctor Thomas Kittredge, a prominent local doctor who served in that capacity in the 1775 Battle of Bunker Hill. The Kittredges remained a prominent medical family in the Andover-North Andover area, producing generations of doctors through the 19th and 20th centuries. Dr. Joseph Kittredge operated a small sanitarium in the house in the 1920s and 1930s. When the house was listed on the National Register in 1976, it was still in the family's hands.

== See also ==
- National Register of Historic Places listings in Essex County, Massachusetts
