= Red Monkey (band) =

English band

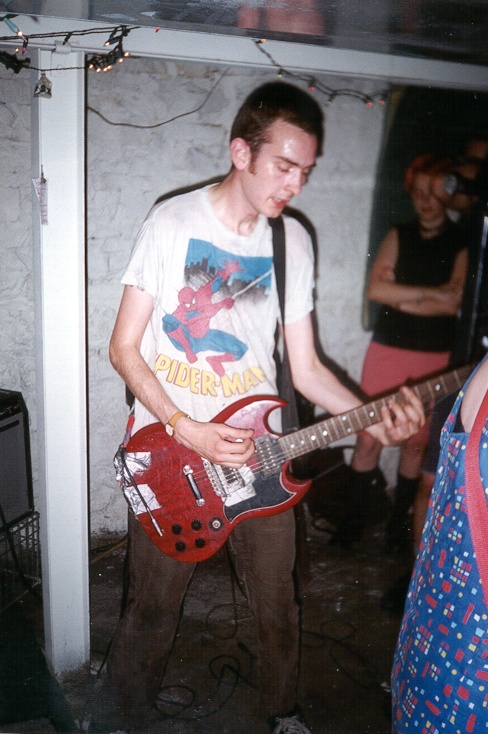
- Red Monkey in 1999

Background information
- Origin: Newcastle, England
- Genres: Post-hardcore; riot grrrl; post-punk; indie rock
- Years active: 1996–2005; 2008
- Labels: Slampt; Troubleman Unlimited; Kill Rock Stars
- Past members: Rachel Holborow; Pete Dale; Marc Walker; Joe Mask

Red Monkey were an English post-hardcore/riot grrrl band from Newcastle, active from 1996 to 2005. The band is notable for their DIY ethics and political lyrics.

== History ==
Red Monkey was formed by Rachel Holborow, Pete Dale and Marc Walker in 1996, following on from Rachel and Pete’s earlier bands, the riot grrrl four-piece Pussycat Trash, and lo-fi duo Avocado Baby. Both acts had released records on the duo’s own record label Slampt, based in their adopted hometown of Newcastle. Marc had previously drummed for Newcastle-based post-hardcore bands Spinach and Kodiak.

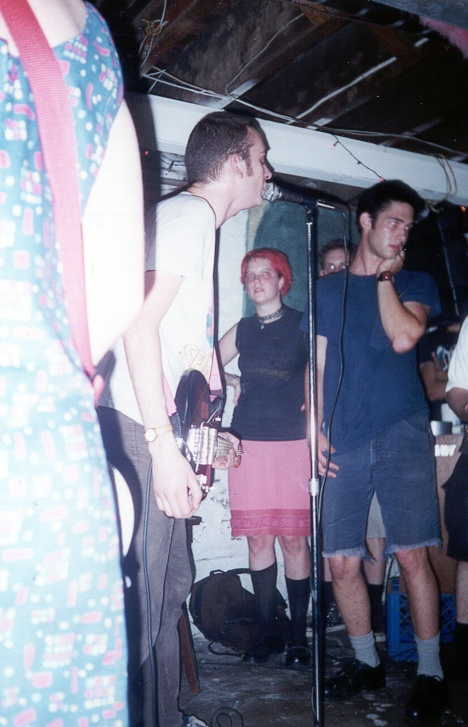
Pete Dale (1999)

Red Monkey’s first release was an EP titled Do What You Feel on Slampt, followed by The Time Is Right on American label Troubleman Unlimited. In 1998, the band released their debut studio album Make The Moment. Following its release, Allmusic praised the album for its "melodic appeal" and the band’s "ability to make entirely political lyrics work in a personal, intelligent manner", while the group’s sound was compared to that of English post-punk band Gang of Four.

In 1998, the band toured the US to support the stateside release of Make The Moment, and a third single followed on Kill Rock Stars, including two tracks performed on the band’s Peel Session earlier the same year. Tours of Ireland and Europe followed before the band recorded their second full-length album, Difficult Is Easy, released in 1999. The record received more mixed reviews than the first; being praised by the NME but criticised by Popmatters for failing to capture the live energy of the band, albeit while making favourable comparisons to both Minutemen and Fugazi, the latter of whom Red Monkey supported on their American tours.

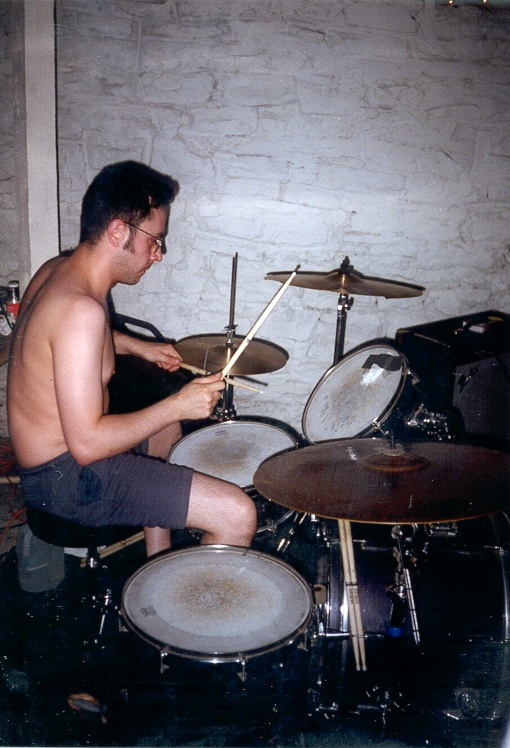
Marc Walker (1999)

The bands third and final album Gunpowder, Treason and Plot was released in 2001 on Troubleman Unlimited, after Slampt records was wound down the previous year. Joe Mask (of Leeds' Bilge Pump) joined the band on second guitar. The album was praised as a return to form and noted for the use of non-standard time signatures, as well as horns, which brought comparisons to The Ex.

From 2001, the band was less active as members focused increasingly on their families and careers. A final split single with Erase Errata was released in 2003 and the band played their last shows in 2005. Dale started work as a music teacher, and later as a lecturer at Oxford Brookes University, while continuing to play in long term side project Milky Wimpshake. However, immediately following Red Monkey, he joined a band called Chronicity. Marc Walker and Rachel Holborow went on to play in The Guise and Do The Right Thing, respectively.

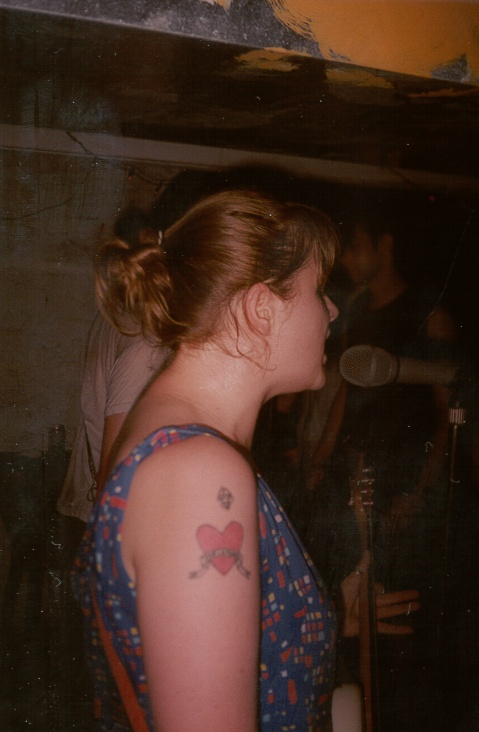
Rachel Holborow (1999)

In 2008, Red Monkey reformed for a night to play a Slampt Records retrospective event in Newcastle, alongside a new generation of post riot-grrrl bands which they and their label helped influence. Since their dissolution, the group continue to be invoked as a touchstone for bands up to the present day. In 2014, Berlin-based label Our Voltage released a Red Monkey singles and rarities compilation album titled How We Learned To Live Like A Bomb. They described it as "posthumous post-punk.. by one of England’s finest Post-RiotGrrrl-Outfits".

== Reception ==
The band have been notated for their overt left-leaning political lyrics. Allmusic acclaimed the political agenda of the group, describing it as "down with materialist culture, up with self-actualization." Chris Nelson, writing for MTV in 1998, noted the group's lyrics and "jagged" sound. He added that the three members had "... distinct voices moving forward as one."

== Band members ==
- Rachel Holborow - vocals, bass (1996–2005)
- Pete Dale - guitar, vocals (1996–2005)
- Marc Walker - drums (1996–2005)
- Joe Mask - guitar (2001–2005)

== Discography ==
=== Studio albums ===
- Make The Moment (Slampt/Troubleman Unlimited, 1998)
- Difficult Is Easy (Slampt/Troubleman Unlimited, 1999)
- Gunpowder, Treason and Plot (Troubleman Unlimited, 2001)

=== Extended plays ===
- Do What You Feel (Feel What You Do) (Slampt, 1997)
- The Time Is Right (Troubleman Unlimited, 1997)
- Mailorder Freak 7” Singles Club (March) (Kill Rock Stars, 1998)
- Get Uncivilised (Troubleman Unlimited, 2000)

=== Split singles ===
- Red Monkey / Submission Hold – Split Single (Radio One, 2000)
- Erase Errata / Red Monkey – Gringo Singles Club #2 (Gringo Records, 2003)

=== Compilation albums ===
- How We Learned To Live Like A Bomb (Our Voltage, 2014)

=== Compilation appearances ===
- Taking A Chance On Chances: Troubleman/Slampt Compilation From The Last Few Years Of The 1990s (Slampt/Troubleman Unlimited, 1998)
- Mordam 1999 (Mordam, 1999)
- The Best Punk Rock In England, My Friend (Snuffy Smile, 1999)
- Tribute To Fort Thunder (US Pop Life Vol.12) (Contact, 2001)
- Troubleman Mix-Tape (Troubleman Unlimited, 2001)
- Yoyo A Go Go 1999 (Yoyo, 2001)
- Fields And Streams (Kill Rock Stars, 2002)
- Troubleman Sampler (Troubleman Unlimited, 2002)
- Twice The Town You'll Ever Be (Twice The Town, 2004)
