= Troubleman Unlimited Records =

Record label

- Founder: Mike Simonetti
- Genre: Noise, Noise rock, drone metal, dance-punk, freak folk, punk jazz, post-metal, post-hardcore, post-punk revival
- Country of origin: United States
- Location: Bayonne, New Jersey

Troubleman Unlimited Records was a record label specializing in indie rock and similar genres. Founded in 1993, the label was based in Bayonne, New Jersey and owned by Mike Simonetti.

== History ==
The label started as an offshoot of a fanzine called "Wanna Communicate?", releasing 7" singles. The label grew significantly in the 2000s, releasing full-length albums by many groups who are regularly reviewed in media outlets like Spin and Pitchfork. The label focused on noise rock, including releases from Black Dice, Wolf Eyes and Hair Police. Troubleman Unlimited was named "Best Label" by New York Magazine in 2005.

In the 21st century, Simonetti started a dance label, Italians Do It Better, with Johnny Jewel of Glass Candy.

== Band roster ==
The following artists have made at least one release through Troubleman Unlimited or Italians Do It Better.

- The Album Leaf
- American Heritage
- Black Dice
- Blank Dogs
- Boris
- Bride of No No
- Camera Obscura
- Chariots (America, North)
- Chromatics
- Currituck Co.
- Death Comet Crew
- Desire
- Devendra Banhart
- Elizabeth Elmore
- Enon
- Erase Errata
- The Fisticuffs Bluff
- The Flying Luttenbachers
- Glass Candy
- Growing
- Hair Police
- Harvey Milk
- Hepatitis Youth
- Isis
- Jana Hunter
- Karp
- Kepler
- The Lack (Columbus, OH)
- Les Georges Leningrad
- Lotus Eaters
- Measles Mumps Rubella
- Meneguar
- Merzbow
- Milky Wimpshake
- Mouthus
- Numbers
- Nuzzle
- One AM Radio
- Orthrelm
- Robert Nanna
- Panthers
- Prurient
- Pussycat Trash
- The Recoys
- Red Monkey
- The Red Scare
- The Rogers Sisters
- Rye Coalition
- Sean Na Na
- Shotmaker
- Tamaryn
- Tara Jane O'Neil
- The Six Parts Seven
- Titus Andronicus
- Tracy + The Plastics
- Tussle
- Unwound
- Vegas Martyrs
- Versus
- The Walkmen
- Wolf Eyes
- Zola Jesus

== See also ==
- List of record labels
- Mordam Records
