= Mabel Hyde Kittredge =

American home economist and social worker

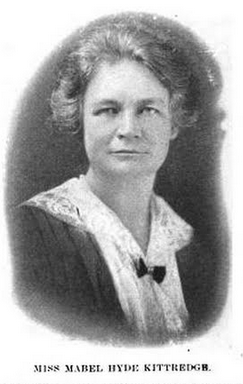
Mabel Hyde Kittredge, from a 1917 publication.

Mabel Hyde Kittredge (September 19, 1867 – May 7, 1955) was an early 20th century American home economist and social worker who is best known as a crusader for school-lunches and an author of books on household management.

== Early years ==
Kittredge was born in Boston, Massachusetts on September 19, 1867. She was the daughter of the well-known and well-to-do Presbyterian pastor Abbott Eliot Kittredge. She was raised in New York City and lived there for most of her adult life.

As a teenager she studied at Miss Porter's School in Farmington, Connecticut.

== Career ==
Kittredge advocated for school lunches and started the hot-lunch program in New York City public schools in 1901. Afterwards, she continued develop the program for the next two decades, finally succeeding in getting it funded by the Board of Education in 1920.

Kittredge helped to financially support the Henry Street Settlement founded by her close friend Lillian Wald, and even lived at the settlement briefly in the early 1900s.

Kittredge became a household adviser because she believed in the importance of the home in national life and because she was shocked by the conditions in which many immigrants lived. Like Christine Frederick, she aimed to improve household management in the United States, with a focus on making better, safer food and furnishings available to women with little money and teaching them up-to-date household management techniques.

Under the umbrella title Association of Practical Housekeeping Centers, she established the first of several "model flats" in a New York City tenement in 1902, declaring: "If household administration is to take its place in the front rank with the other professions of the day, educators as well as women must wake up and realize that the whole housekeeping question is dependent upon scientific management, efficiency, skilled labor, and effective tools."

Her 1911 book Housekeeping Notes: How to Furnish and Keep House in a Tenement Flat was a compendium of household management lessons taught in these centers, and her 1918 book The Home and Its Management offered practical advice on thrift in furnishing a home as well as in shopping for daily necessities. She became the most famous home economist (also known then as home adviser) of her day.

In 1915, she attended the International Women's Congress for Peace and Freedom at The Hague. She went overseas during World War I, working for Herbert Hoover and for the Commission for Relief in Belgium, heading up the child-feeding program in France and Belgium. She saw her work for the war effort as analogous to her work on household management: both were forms of national service. Papers relating to Kittredge's work with the Commission for Relief in the period 1915-18 are held by the Hoover Institution Archives in Stanford, California.

== Publications ==
- The Home and Its Management (1917)
- Practical Homemaking; a Textbook for Young Housekeepers (1914)
- Housekeeping Notes: How to Furnish and Keep House in a Tenement Flat (1911)
- Housekeeping in a Model Flat (1905)
