= Milky Wimpshake =

Lo-fi indie punk band

- Genres: C86, lo-fi
- Years active: 1993–present
- Labels: Slampt, Fortuna Pop
- Members: Pete Dale, Christine Rowe, Mike Walsh
- Past members: Joey Ramone

Milky Wimpshake are a lo-fi indie punk three-piece from Newcastle, who originally consisted of Joey Ramone (no relation), Christine Rowe, and Pete Dale.

== Career ==
Milky Wimpshake formed in 1993 after Dale, who had previously been in Razorblade Smile, met Ramone; he recruited Christine Rowe to play bass. Various drummers have played with the band over the years, replacing Ramone.

== Discography ==
- Songs of Zoom and Buzz (1994)
- Bus Route to Your Heart (1997)
- Lovers Not Fighters (2002)
- Popshaped (2005)
- My Funny Social Crime (2010)
- Heart and Soul in the Milky Way (2013)
- Encore, Un Effort (2015)
- Confessions of an English Marxist (2020)
