= As Brave as We Could Be =

Studio album by Jellicoe
- Released: 16 April 2001
- Studio: 5 Mile High Studio, Peterborough
- Genre: Alternative rock
- Length: 47:12
- Label: Do-Little Records
- Producer: Andy Hawkins

Singles from As Brave As We Could Be
- 1. "Panic 250 EP" Released: 14 August 2000; 2. "Self Defence EP" Released: 26 March 2001

As Brave as We Could Be is the only studio album by British band Jellicoe, issued by Do-Little Records in 2001. It is notable as the first album to feature Jay McAllister who later went on to have a successful career as a folk singer-songwriter under the stage name Beans On Toast.

== Background ==
Jellicoe were a 3-piece alternative rock band from Essex. The group was formed before they could play (or owned) instruments while still at school in 1996. Inspired by Nirvana's punk approach they taught themselves to play and wrote their first batch of songs. After gaining a following playing local venues around the county, including a headlining slot at the Harlow Square, they were signed to Do-Little Records. As Brave as We Could Be was recorded at 5 Mile High Studio in Peterborough and produced by Andy Hawkins.

== Reception ==
The track "Arcade Superhero" received airplay on BBC Radio 1 from DJ John Peel, who was impressed enough to invite the band to record a BBC session shortly before the album's release.

Describing first single "Panic 250", Louis Pattison of the NME wrote that "Jellicoe roll out the same pleasing list of influences that have warmed the cockles of Steve Lamacq's heart since the beginning of recorded indie time."

Lamacq himself supported the album by playing follow up single "Self Defence" on his Radio 1 show The Evening Session, with NME's Victoria Segal remarking that "this trio of Essex adolescents certainly have the courage of their ramshackle convictions" in her review of the track.

Jellicoe split up before recording a follow-up, making As Brave as We Could Be the band's one and only studio album.

== Track listing ==
All tracks are written by Jellicoe.

| No. | Title | Length |
|---|---|---|
| 1. | "Panic 250" | 2:33 |
| 2. | "Space Shuttle" | 3:22 |
| 3. | "The Story So Far" | 4:47 |
| 4. | "Battle Cat" | 1:55 |
| 5. | "Self Defence" | 3:25 |
| 6. | "Monster Killed By Lazer Gun" | 4:53 |
| 7. | "Orange Juice" | 3:14 |
| 8. | "Arcade Superhero" | 2:41 |
| 9. | "I.E.D." | 2:52 |
| 10. | "Fire Engine" | 3:07 |
| 11. | "Skylights" | 3:43 |
| 12. | "Aim for the City" | 10:40 |
| Total length: | | 47:12 |

The track "Arcade Superhero" was originally featured on the Fierce Panda compilation Cutting Hedge.

A hidden track appears after 3 minutes of silence following "Aim For The City".

== Personnel ==
- Jay McAllister – Vocals, guitar, artwork
- Jot Fuller – Bass
- Dave Danger – Drums
- Andy Hawkins – Production
