= List of Fierce Panda Records artists =

The following is a list of bands who had material released on London-based label Fierce Panda Records.

- (x) is greater than (y)
- Absent Kid
- Acres of Lions
- Agent Blue
- Alterkicks
- Apartment
- Art Brut
- Astronaut
- Atlantic Dash
- Bag of Cans
- Battle
- Bellatrix
- Blackbud
- Boy Kill Boy
- Cablecar
- Capdown
- CAPITAL
- Coldplay
- David Ford
- Dead Disco
- Death Cab for Cutie
- Desperate Journalist
- Dweeb
- Electricity in our Homes
- Enjoyable Listens
- Fightmilk
- Further
- Gledhill
- Goldheart Assembly
- Thee Heavenly Music Association
- The Hot Puppies
- Idlewild
- iLiKETRAiNS
- Jellicoe
- Kari Kleiv
- Keane
- Kenickie
- Kitchens of Distinction
- Lapsus Linguae
- Le Neon
- Milo Greene
- Make Good Your Escape
- My Architects
- Oasis
- Pile
- The Polyphonic Spree
- Scarfo
- Seafood
- Shitdisco
- Simple Kid
- sixbyseven
- The Blackout
- The Disappointments
- The Drama
- The Features
- The Immediate
- The Revelations
- The Vacation
- This Girl
- Twist
- VLMV
- Winnebago Deal
- Wounds
- Wreckless Eric
- Wynona Bleach
- YMSS

== See also ==
- Fierce Panda Records
- List of Fierce Panda Records compilation albums
