= Jellicoe (band) =

British rock band

- Origin: Braintree, Essex, UK
- Genres: Alternative rock Indie rock Grunge
- Years active: 1996-2001
- Labels: Fierce Panda Records; Do-Little Records
- Past members: Jay McAllister; Dave Danger; Jot Fuller

Jellicoe were an English alternative rock band formed in Essex in 1996.

The lineup included singer/guitarist Jay McAllister who went on to find future solo success under the name Beans On Toast. Drummer Dave Danger was later a founding member of UK indie band The Holloways.

== Biography ==
School friends McAllister and Danger, along with bass player Jot Fuller, formed Jellicoe as teenagers in 1996 while attending Notley High School in Braintree. Named after historic seafarer Captain John Jellicoe, they recorded several early demos between 1997 and 1999 and began playing a series of chaotic gigs across Essex and London, including headline slots at the Harlow Square and the Bull and Gate in Kentish Town, where they were spotted by Fierce Panda Records. Their first release was the track "Arcade Superhero" on the Fierce Panda compilation Cutting Hedge in May 2000.

They released their debut album As Brave as We Could Be on Do-Little Records the following year, which was produced by Andy Hawkins of Midget. NME magazine praised Jellicoe's "bloody-knuckled teenage rock’n’roll charm", comparing them to Dinosaur Jr. and Ash.

The album brought them to the attention of BBC Radio DJ John Peel, who invited them to record a session at Maida Vale Studios which was broadcast on Radio 1 in March 2001.

The band split up shortly after relocating from Essex to London in late 2001, with Jay McAllister describing this period in his book Drunk Folk Stories, published in 2018.

Jellicoe have been mentioned in at least two songs: "The Mudhills Crew" from Beans on Toast's 2015 album Rolling Up The Hill, and "Fort Disney" by Union Kid, from the 2000 album Candy Falls Here.

== Discography ==
Albums

- As Brave as We Could Be (2001), Do-Little Records

Singles

- Panic 250 EP (2000), Do-Little Records
- Self Defence EP (2001), Do-Little Records

Compilations

- "Arcade Superhero" featured on Cutting Hedge (2000), Fierce Panda Records
