= In Search of the Miraculous (Desperate Journalist album) =

Studio album by Desperate Journalist
- Released: 22 February 2019
- Genre: Indie rock, gothic rock, shoegaze, post-punk
- Length: 43:38
- Label: Fierce Panda

Desperate Journalist chronology
Grow Up (2017)	In Search of the Miraculous (2019)

Singles from In Search of the Miraculous
- 1. "Cedars" Released: 2 November 2018; 2. "Satellite" Released: 11 January 2019

Professional ratings
Aggregate scores
Source	Rating
Metacritic	77/100
Review scores
Source	Rating
The Line of Best Fit	8.5/10
The Skinny	5/5 stars

In Search of the Miraculous is the third studio album by English post punk band Desperate Journalist. It was released on 22 February 2019 through Fierce Panda Records.

== Track listing ==
No.	Title	Length
1.	"Murmuration"	4:55
2.	"Cedars"	4:38
3.	"Jonatan"	4:17
4.	"International Waters"	5:00
5.	"Argonauts"	4:18
6.	"Black Net"	4:21
7.	"Ocean Wave"	3:20
8.	"Girl of the Houses"	3:51
9.	"Satellite"	4:19
10.	"To Be Forgotten"	4:39

== Charts ==
Chart	Peak position
UK Independent Albums (OCC)	22
