= List of Fierce Panda Records compilation albums =

Fierce Panda Records is a UK based independent record label especially well known for their compilation albums and EPs. These are traditionally named after a pun or in-joke, and are usually deleted on the day of release. A list of these and some of the most famous bands featured is below.

== Discography ==
=== Albums ===
Title	Featuring	Year
Nings of Desire	Ash, Supergrass, Gorky's Zygotic Mynci, The Bluetones, China Drum	1995
Dial M For Merthyr	Manic Street Preachers, Stereophonics, Catatonia, 60ft Dolls	1997
Nings And Roundabouts	Placebo, Kenickie, 3 Colours Red, Babybird, BIS	1999
Where The Wild Nings Are	Embrace, Lo-Fidelity Allstars, Idlewild	1999
The Dead Cheap Sampler	Seafood, Coldplay, Hundred Reasons, Llama Farmers	2000
Mosh & Go	Jimmy Eat World, Hundred Reasons, The Parkinsons, Reuben	2001
Live The Dream	Death Cab for Cutie, Simple Kid, Seafood, The Music, Easyworld	2002
Decade: Ten Years of Fierce Panda	Keane, Bright Eyes, The Polyphonic Spree, Six By Seven	2004
The Bakers Arms Dozen	Shitdisco, Art Brut, The Maccabees, Capdown, Dead Disco, Coldplay	2007
Spirit of Talk Talk	Zero 7, King Creosote, Turin Brakes, Jason Lytle, White Lies	2012
Survival?: A Fierce Panda Sampler	Milo Greene, The Raveonettes	2014

NB: Catalogue numbers of singles released on Fierce Panda Records begin with the characters "NING" resulting in the titles of many of the above items being in-joke puns.

=== EPs ===
Title	Featuring	Year
Shagging In The Streets	S*M*A*S*H, These Animal Men	1994
Crazed And Confused	Credit To The Nation, Ash, Supergrass	1994
Return To Splendour	The Bluetones	1994
From Greer To Eternity	Lush, Splendora, Jale, Fuzzy	1994
Built To Blast	Green Day, China Drum	1994
Suzi Quatro Lives In Chelmsford EP	Scarfo	1995
Mortal Wombat	Super Furry Animals, Babybird, Spare Snare	1995
Songs About Plucking	Bis, Number One Cup, Magoo	1996
Screecher Comforts	Symposium, Inter, Midget	1996
Listen With Smother	Ultrasound, Lo-Fidelity Allstars	1997
Bless His Little Cotton Rocks	The Crocketts, Cassius, Libido	1997
Cry Me A Liver	Unbelievable Truth, Theaudience, The Clientele	1997
Dark Side Of The Raccoon	The High Fidelity, Jetboy DC, Spraydog	1998
The Joy Of Plecs	The Monsoon Bassoon, Cay	1998
The Panda In A Big Vanda Tour '98	Tiny Too, Billy Mahonie, Seafood	1998
Dope Is Important	Bellatrix, Bikini Atoll	1999
Otter Than July	Rositsa, Mo-Ho-Bish-O-Pi, Scribble	1999
Cutting Hedge	Jellicoe, Caretaker	2000
Clooney Tunes	...And You Will Know Us by the Trail of Dead, Interpol, Bright Eyes	2000
Cheffing & Blinding	Six by Seven, Brazil	2001
Vet Sounds	Bravecaptain, Tompaulin	2001
Mosh	The Parkinsons, The Suffrajets, Reuben, Elviss	2001
Go	Jimmy Eat World, Stapleton, Kids Near Water	2001
The Squirrel EP	ThisGirl, Funeral for a Friend, Engerica, Million Dead, Jarcrew	2003
Spring Tour 2003	Winnebago Deal, Further, (x) Is Greater Than (y)	2003
On The Buzzes	Razorlight, The Rakes, The Rocks	2004
Glowing Underground	Dogs Die In Hot Cars, Odeon Beatclub	2004
Shock & Oar	The Twilight Singers, The Walkmen, Film School	2004
Zip It Up	The Crookes, The Heartbreaks	2010
Licensed to Drill	White Belt Yellow Tag, Twin Tigers, The Megaphonic Thrift	2010

NB: Shagging In The Streets was the first ever Fierce Panda release.

== See also ==
- Fierce Panda Records
- List of bands signed to Fierce Panda Records
