= Monte Conner =

American record label executive

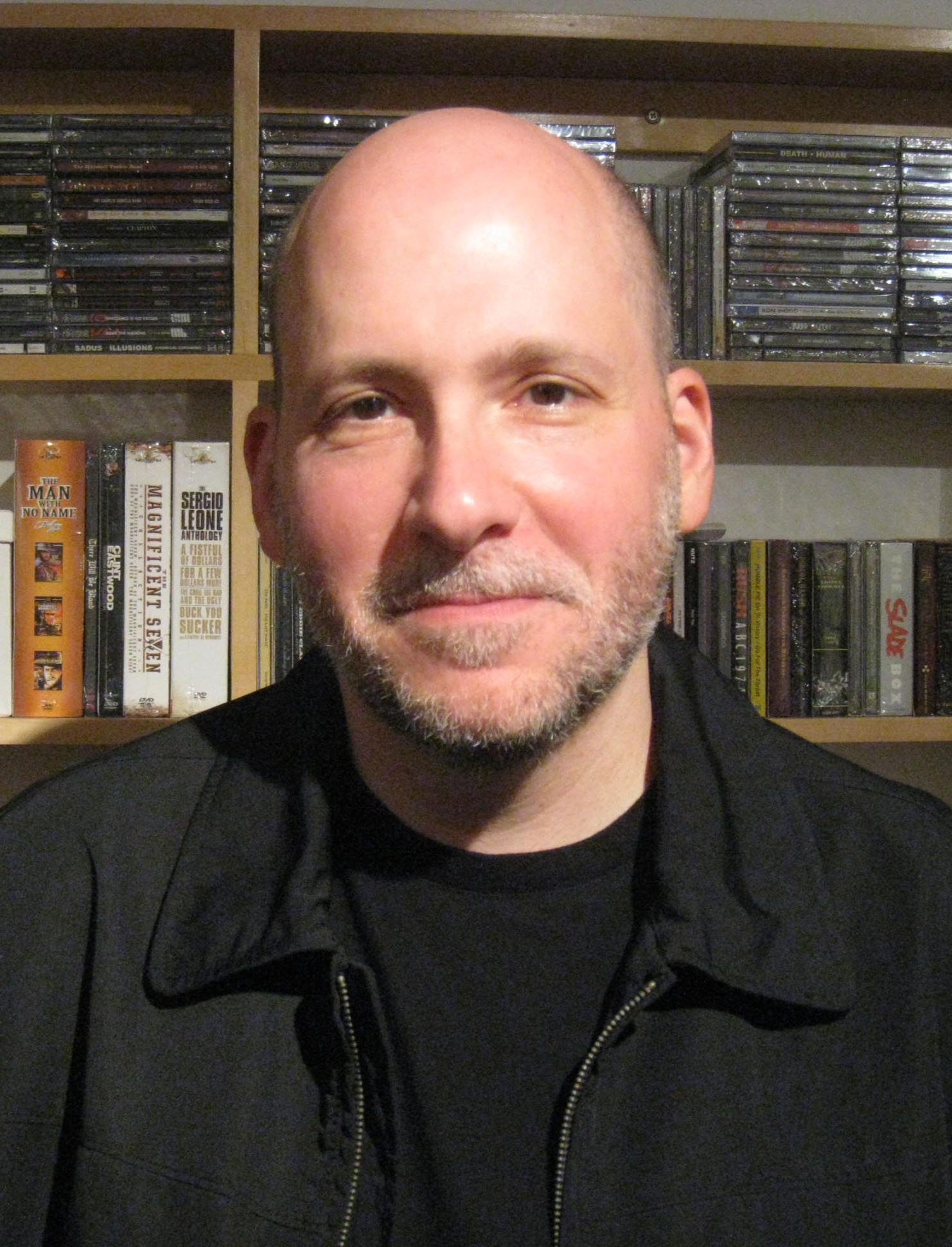
- Conner in 2012

Background information
- Born: May 31, 1964 (age 61)
- Origin: Staten Island, United States
- Genres: Heavy metal; hard rock; rock
- Occupation: Music executive (A&R)
- Years active: 1982–present
- Labels: Roadrunner; Nuclear Blast; Shatter

Monte Conner (born May 31, 1964) is an American music executive and artists and repertoire (A&R) representative. He was the former senior vice president of A&R for Roadrunner Records from 1988 until 2012, and is currently the head of A&R at Nuclear Blast Records. MetalSucks has called him "the most successful A&R dude in the history of metal."

Conner is considered to be an expert not only in the genre of Heavy Metal, but also in the genres of Rock, Hard Rock and Classic Rock, and frequently discusses bands from these genres in magazines, on radio programs and podcasts, and in music films and documentaries. He occasionally serves as a consultant on reissue albums for various labels. He is also a music journalist and has written for Metal Mania magazine in the US, Classic Rock magazine in the UK, Rock Hard magazine in Germany, and currently writes in his own online blog on Facebook.

== Career ==
=== Early career and Roadrunner Records (1987–2012) ===
His path into the music industry began while at Baruch College in Manhattan, where he hosted a weekly underground metal radio show, called “The Witching Hour,” at the school's radio station WBMB. The show ran from September 1982 to December 1986 and during that time Conner immersed himself in the emerging thrash and death metal scenes, honing his skills for discovering new talent. After graduating college, he landed a job at Shatter Records handling College Radio Promotion. He was at Shatter for nine months, from March to November 1987, before leaving to join Roadrunner Records in December 1987, also doing College Radio Promotion. By January 1988, he added A&R to his duties at the label, and by late 1988 he became the label's Head of A&R for North America.

The bands he signed to Roadrunner Records, in alphabetical order, are:

Amen, Annihilator, Artillery, Atrocity, Believer, Biohazard, Both Worlds, Brujeria, Buzzov-en, Jerry Cantrell, Cavalera Conspiracy, Chimaira, CKY, Coal Chamber, Cynic, Dååth, Death, Deicide, Defiance, DevilDriver, Dirty Americans, Disincarnate, Dommin, Downthesun, Earth Crisis, Exhorder, Fear Factory, Floodgate, Glassjaw, Gojira, Gorguts, Gruntruck, Heathen, Immolation, Kinetic Dissent, Last Crack, Leadfoot, Life Of Agony, Machine Head, Malevolent Creation, Mina Caputo, Murderdolls, Nailbomb, Obituary, Optimum Wound Profile, Pestilence, Porcupine Tree, Powersurge, Realm, Revoker, Rush, Sadus, Sanctity, Sepultura, Shank 456, Skin Chamber, Slipknot, Solitude Aeturnus, Sorrow, Soulfly, Spineshank, Star Star, Stone Sour, Storm Corrosion, Suffocation, Taking Dawn, 36 Crazyfists, Times Of Grace, To My Surprise, Toyshop, Treponem Pal, Trivium, Type O Negative, Wednesday 13, Willard, The Workhorse Movement.

In addition, Conner signed licensing deals for Roadrunner outside North America for the following bands: Acid Bath, Divine Heresy, Hatebreed, Heaven & Hell, Glen Hughes, Karma To Burn, Periphery, Queens Of The Stone Age, Satyricon, Sevendust, Shadows Fall.

Conner also signed licensing deals for catalogue records from these bands for release on Roadrunner in the U.S.: Angelwitch, Budgie, Destruction, Entombed, Evildead, Hitmann, Gary Moore, Motörhead, Raven, Razor, Saint Vitus, Sodom, Uriah Heep.

He signed producer Ross Robinson to a worldwide production deal with Roadrunner for his I Am Recordings imprint.

He also brought in the following label deals to Roadrunner outside North America: Energy Records, Ferret Music, Soundfront Records, Trustkill Records.

Conner conceived of and oversaw the Roadrunner United album and live DVD, compiled the “MTV2 Headbanger’s Ball” and “The Return Of The Rock” series, compiled various compilations (“At Death’s Door,” “At Death’s Door II,” “Burn One Up!,” “XXX: Three Decades Of Roadrunner Records,” and more) and soundtracks (“Resident Evil,” “Resident Evil: Apocalypse,” “Freddy Vs. Jason,” “MTV Road Rules,” “Ginger Snaps,” and “Faust”) and oversaw all Roadrunner's catalogue reissues and remasters.

Other Roadrunner artists Conner has also A&R’ed but did not sign include: Atrophy, Chastain, Dream Theater, Front Line Assembly, Holy Terror, The Great Kat, Kenny Wayne Shepherd, Killswitch Engage, King Diamond, Korn, Lynyrd Skynyrd, Mutiny Within, Nightwish, Opeth, Rob Zombie, Shelter, The Steve Miller Band, Toxik, Whiplash, Znöwhite.

Conner left Roadrunner on August 2, 2012, after much turnover at the label. On August 16, 2012, it was announced that he would be partnering with Nuclear Blast Records.

=== Nuclear Blast (2012–present) ===
The bands he has signed to Nuclear Blast Records, in alphabetical order, are:

Alluvial, Anti-Mortem, Arrival Of Autumn, As I Lay Dying, Atheist (catalog), Aversions Crown, Black Star Riders, Brujeria, Cavalera, Conjurer, Corrosion Of Conformity, Crobot, The Damned Things, Danzig, The Defiled, The Depression/Aggression Sessions (project), Devilment, Devil You Know, Earthless, Elegant Weapons, Exhorder, Fallujah, Fear Factory, Fit For An Autopsy, Fuming Mouth, Gatecreeper, Ghost Bath, Hatebreed (North America only), Ibaraki, Irist, Khemmis, Killer Be Killed, Lamb Of God, Light The Torch, Machine Head, Metal Allegiance, Nails, Nightwish (North America only), Opeth, Pallbearer, Satyricon, Scorpion Child, Sadus, Soulfly, Stellar Circuits, Suicide Silence, Tax The Heat, Thy Art Is Murder, Till The Dirt, Vein.fm, Ricky Warwick, Wednesday 13, Within Temptation, Rob Zombie.

Other artists Monte has A&R’ed at Nuclear Blast but did not sign include: 96 Bitter Beings, Go Ahead And Die.

== See also ==
Roadrunner Records
