= OWP =

OWP may refer to:

- Camp of Great Poland (Obóz Wielkiej Polski), a political organization in interwar Poland
- Optimum Wound Profile, an industrial metal band from Ipswich, England
- William R. Pogue Municipal Airport, Osage County, Oklahoma, United States (FAA LID code)
- Opponents' Winning Percentage, used in calculating a team's rating percentage index in sports
