= Insision =

Swedish death metal band

- Origin: Stockholm, Sweden
- Genre: Brutal death metal
- Years active: 1997–present
- Labels: Dental Records, Earache Records, Sevared Records
- Members: Carl Birath; Roger Tobias Johansson; Gustav Trodin
- Website: insision.com

Insision is a death metal band from Stockholm, Sweden. They are signed to Sevared Records.

== Biography ==
Insision plays brutal death metal and is recognized for its non-Swedish sound. Drawing inspiration from Cryptopsy, Morbid Angel, Cannibal Corpse and Deicide, the group is associated with death metal from North America.

They have released four albums, Beneath The Folds of Flesh (2002), Revealed and Worshipped (2004), Ikon (2007) and Terminal Reckoning (2016). Beside those, they have released three demos, Meant to Suffer (1997), Promo 2000 (2000) and Revelation of the SadoGod (2001). They recorded a split with Inveracity called Revelation of the SadoGod in 2001. The Insision side is the aforementioned Revelation of the SadoGod demo. They have released two EPs, The Dead Live On (1999) and End Of All (2011).

The labels that have worked with Insision are Heathendoom Records Sweden, Earache Records UK, Dental Records Sweden, and Sevared Records USA.

In December 2010, Insision signed with US-based Sevared Records. Insision Recorded the EP End Of All, released in 2011. Sevared Records released the Insision compilation album 15 Years Of Exaggerated Torment (2012). Terminal Reckoning was released by Sevared Records (2016).

== Members ==
- Carl Birath - vocals
- Roger Tobias Johansson - guitar
- Gustav Trodin - bass

== Past members ==
- Ibrahim Stråhlman Drums (session) (2015)
- Adam Ramis guitar (2011–2014)
- Marcus Dalmanner bass (2005–2014)
- Joel Andersson bass (2010–2014)
- Magnus Martinsson guitar (2007–2010)
- Daniel Ekeroth bass (2000–2009)
- Thomas Daun - drums [Still on Revealed and Worshipped] (1997–2004)
- Toob Brynedahl - guitar [Still on Revealed and Worshipped] (2001–2004)
- Joonas Ahonen - guitar (1997–2000)
- Janne Hyytia - bass (1999 only)
- Johan Thornberg - vocals (1997–1999)
- Daniel Sommerfeldt bass (1997–1999)
- Christian Eriksson - live guitar on Scandinavian tours (2005)

== Discography ==
- Meant to Suffer (1997, Demo)
- Live Like a Worm (1998, Demo)
- The Dead Live On (1999, EP)
- Promo 2000 (2000, Demo)
- Supreme Brutal Legions (2000, split w/ various artists)
- Insision / Inveracity (2001, Split with Inveracity. The Insision part is basically the same as "Revelation of the SadoGod.)
- Revelation of the Sadogod (2001, Demo)
- Beneath the Folds of Flesh (2002, album)
- Revealed and Worshipped (2004, album)
- Ikon (September 26, 2007, album)
- End of All (June 1, 2011, EP)
- 15 Years of Exaggerated Torment (May 25, 2012, compilation)
- Terminal Reckoning (2016, Album)
