= Desperate Journalist (album) =

Studio album by Desperate Journalist
- Released: January 1st, 2015
- Recorded: 2014
- Studio: Dean Street Studios
- Genre: post punk, indie rock
- Length: 37:46
- Label: Fierce Panda
- Producer: Desperate Journalist / Keith TOTP

Desperate Journalist chronology
Desperate Journalist (2015)	Good Luck (2015)

Singles from Desperate Journalist
- 1. "Cristina" Released: June 2013; 2. "Happening" Released: May 2014; 3. "Hesitate" Released: June 2015

Desperate Journalist is the debut album by London-based post punk band Desperate Journalist. It was released on January 1, 2015, on Fierce Panda Records. It received strongly positive reviews from The Quietus and Drowned in Sound.

== Track listing ==
All tracks are written by Desperate Journalist

No.	Title	Length
1.	"Control"	2:54
2.	"O"	3:42
3.	"Cristina"	3:07
4.	"Hesitate"	3:26
5.	"Reminder"	2:59
6.	"Distance"	4:08
7.	"Nothing"	4:07
8.	"Happening"	2:43
9.	"Eulogy"	2:46
10.	"Heartbeats"	4:26
11.	"Cement"	3:28
Total length:		37:46

== Personnel ==
Desperate Journalist

- Jo Bevan – voice
- Robert Hardy – guitar
- Simon Drowner – bass
- Caroline Helbert – drums

Production

- Austen and Jonny – engineering
- Götz-Michael Rieth – mixing

== B-sides ==
from the "Cristina" EP

- "Mistakes"
- "Kitten"
- "Wait"

from "Happening"

- "Vengeance"

from "Hesitate"

- "Happening (Medium Wave remix)"
