= You're Gonna Need a Little Music =

Studio album by Yard Act
- Released: 17 July 2026
- Studios: Chapel, Leeds; The Nave, Leeds; Chez JMJ, Los Angeles
- Length: 41:43
- Label: Island
- Producers: Justin Meldal-Johnsen; Yard Act

Yard Act chronology
Where's My Utopia? (2024)	You're Gonna Need a Little Music (2026)

Singles from You're Gonna Need a Little Music
- 1. "Redeemer" Released: 7 May 2026; 2. "New Beginnings" Released: 23 June 2026

You're Gonna Need a Little Music is the third studio album by British rock band Yard Act, released on July 17, 2026 on Island. Produced by Justin Meldal-Johnsen and the band itself, the album was recorded in both Leeds and Los Angeles. It was preceded by the singles "Redeemer" and "New Beginnings".

Released to positive reviews, the album reached number fifteen on the UK Albums Chart, number three on the Scottish Albums Chart and number three on the on the UK Physical Albums Chart.

== Background and recording ==
The album was recorded in Leeds and Los Angeles with Justin Meldal-Johnsen, known for his work with Nine Inch Nails, M83, Beck, and St. Vincent. In contrast with their previous two records, the album was primarily written and recorded as a band, rather than as "laptop records"; The Overload was written before the band became a touring unit, and writing for Where's My Utopia? took place during touring for their debut album. They assembled their own dedicated studio space in their hometown of Leeds and wrote 40 or 50 songs. Singer James Smith noted that the process "felt like freedom" and encapsulated everything he had originally wanted out of being in a band.

Smith praised the sense of unity that producer Meldal-Johnsen brought to the recording sessions, noting: "This is the first time it’s been a full team effort. Justin said, ‘I think you guys are like the Monkees: all four of you could have your own TV show, but the band is greater than the sum of its parts. So I want everyone’s individuality to shine on this record. I want everyone to be able to see what makes a Yard Act record, because you can sense the people within it,’ which I think as a sort of recording philosophy is amazing. And I think he managed that."

== Songs and themes ==
Lyrically, the album serves as James Smith's exploration of an aspect of the modern psyche. According to the band's press statements on Pitchfork, the core concept of the record focuses on the dangers of the multiple realities of the contemporary era, and of hyper-individualism. Smith targets how the modern, internet-driven world encourages people to isolate into echo chambers, ultimately leading society to question whether a shared, objective reality exists. The lyrics take a more abstract approach, as opposed to the vignette approach of the Dark Days EP and the debut album.

== Critical reception ==
Professional ratings
Aggregate scores
Source	Rating
AnyDecentMusic?	7.8/10
Metacritic	77/100
Review scores
Source	Rating
AllMusic	4/5 stars
Clash	5/10
DIY Magazine	5/5 stars
Dork	5/5 stars
Mojo	4/5 stars
NME	4.5/5 stars
Pitchfork	6.2/10
Rolling Stone	3.5/5 stars
The Skinny	4/5 stars

You’re Gonna Need a Little Music received generally favourable reviews upon release. On review aggregator Metacritic, it has a score of 77 out of 100, based on fourteen reviews, citing "generally favorable" reception.

== Track listing ==
All tracks are written by Yard Act, except tracks 1, 4 and 8 written by Yard Act and Christopher Duffin. All lyrics by James Smith.

You're Gonna Need a Little Music track listing
No.	Title	Length
1.	"Empty Pledges"	4:25
2.	"New Beginnings"	3:27
3.	"Tall Tales"	3:51
4.	"Fiction"	2:40
5.	"You're Gonna Need a Little Music"	4:40
6.	"Cherophobe Rock"	2:52
7.	"Thrill of the Chase"	2:30
8.	"Janey Said"	4:51
9.	"Redeemer"	3:59
10.	"Talky Talky People"	3:56
11.	"Over the Barrel"	4:33
Total length:		41:44

== Personnel ==
Credits are adapted from Tidal.

=== Yard Act ===
- Ryan Needham – bass guitar (all tracks), background vocals (tracks 1–4, 6–11), artwork, design
- Jay Russell – drums, percussion, engineering (all tracks); synthesiser (1, 2, 4–6, 8, 10), programming (2, 4), electric piano (3)
- Samuel Shipstone – guitar (all tracks), background vocals (7, 11)
- James Smith – vocals (all tracks), piano (1, 3–6, 8–11), synthesiser (1, 3, 7), percussion (1, 9), handclaps (2, 3); congas, electric piano (5); finger clicks (11), paintings

=== Additional contributors ===
- Justin Meldal-Johnsen – production, engineering (all tracks); drum programming (2), synthesiser (3, 5, 8–10), handclaps (3, 11), percussion (4, 5, 7), background vocals (6, 7, 9), drums (6)
- Derek Coburn – engineering, mixing
- Danny Blackburn – engineering, mixing assistance
- Matt Peel – engineering
- Felix Davis – mastering
- Christopher Duffin – organ (2, 11), saxophone (4, 8–10); flute, synthesiser (4); sound design (8, 9)
- David Ralicke – horn arrangement, alto saxophone, tenor saxophone (2)
- Vikram Devasthali – trombone (2)
- Jordan Katz – trumpet (2)
- Charlie Drinkwater – artwork, design
- James Winstanley – photography

== Charts ==
Chart performance for You're Gonna Need a Little Music
Chart (2026)	Peak position
Scottish Albums (Official Charts)	3
UK Albums (Official Charts)	15
