= Blabbermouth.net =

Website dedicated to heavy metal and hard rock news

- Website type: News and reviews
- Owner: Borivoj Krgin
- Creator: Borivoj Krgin
- Website: blabbermouth.net
- Registration: Optional
- Launched: March 3, 2001; 25 years ago
- Current status: Active

Blabbermouth.net is a website dedicated to metal and hard rock news, as well as album and music DVD reviews. It is run by the website's founder Borivoj Krgin. The first version of the website was launched in March 2001. In October 2001, the record label Roadrunner Records began hosting it.

Users can post comments to selected news articles and album reviews, either in response to other user comments or in response to the article itself.

== History ==
Founder Borivoj Krgin came up with the concept of Blabbermouth in January 2000. Robert Kampf, a friend of Krgin who runs Century Media Records, was staying with Krgin in New York and set up a meeting with Gunter Ford of World Management. During the meeting, Ford suggested an idea for a "heavy metal portal", a site which would offer news, merchandise, and CD reviews to get record labels to sell their products through the site. Ford wanted Kampf to be involved. Krgin disliked the idea and wished for a site that offered around-the-clock news, as he thought that no good news sites existed.

Krgin began researching how to develop and host his own website two months after the meeting. After a year, he felt comfortable going "live". The initial "primitive" version of the site was launched on March 3, 2001. In October of the same year, Monte Conner (a Roadrunner Records A&R and friend of Krgin) approached Krgin with the idea of having the site hosted on the Roadrunner servers. This way, Krgin could focus on Blabbermouth.net's content rather than the technical aspects involved in running a site.

== Sources ==
According to his own words, Krgin spends most of his time operating the site. When finding information relating to bands, Krgin said he searches bands' official websites (including social networking sites), which are usually reported on immediately, and band message boards where members of the band post. He also relies on direct correspondence with contacts he has made over the years ranging from band members, metal journalists, managers, and other people in the music industry, stating this is where the "best" information comes from.

Blabbermouth.net has a 'submit news' feature which has proved to be helpful to Krgin. When receiving a rumor he deems worthy of posting, Krgin will first research and contact people related to the band and question them about the rumour. It is reported that 90% of the information posted is either found online or is submitted directly to the website by bands, managers, labels, or associated persons.

== Reception ==
Blabbermouth.net is described by the London Free Press as a "reliable industry and fan site". Die Welt has called the site "one of the most influential and most quoted news sites for heavy metal and hard rock".

Writing in 2016, MetalSucks founder Axl Rosenburg said that Blabbermouth.net "was basically the news brief section of the (by this point failing) metal magazines, only it was far more detailed, and it gave you the news as it happened, 24/7." Devin Townsend also said that the site "changed the way we do interviews by making us accountable".

Blabbermouth.net has been criticized by musicians and music industry persons for internet trolls and for news posts that are unrelated to metal or rock. Krgin said he posts these articles to attract humorous comments from users, and as relief from the constant monotony of album news. In September 2006, Krgin stated he performed a cleanup of Blabbermouth.net's comments and adopted a policy whereby users can report offensive comments in order to have them deleted from the site. Prior to this, in his own words, "countless" offensive comments had been posted on the site since the comments feature was implemented in early 2002.

== Traffic ==
Blabbermouth.net was visited by more than 1.2 million unique users each month, and it had an average of 80,000 unique visitors per day as of August 2011, according to Google Analytics. The busiest day was 298,000 unique visitors in a single 24-hour period over May 16, 2010, due to the death of Ronnie James Dio. The second-busiest day was more than 200,000 unique visitors in a single 24-hour period, which happened the day after the death of Type O Negative frontman Peter Steele on April 15, 2010.

As of August 2008, Blabbermouth.net was ranked as the 12,279th-most-trafficked website globally according to Alexa.

Prior to its recent change requiring users to log in with a Facebook account in order to post comments, Blabbermouth.net had more 101,000 registered users (users who are registered to post comments on the site) as of August 2011.
