= Special Duties =

Special Duties (band)
- Origin: Colchester, England
- Genres: Punk rock, Hardcore Punk, Street Punk
- Years active: 1977-1983, 1995-present
- Labels: Charnel House, Rondolet, Captain Oi!, Jailhouse, Violated
- Members: Bart Povah; Steve Duty; Stuart Bray; Dave Sadler
- Past members: Nigel Baker; Mark Gregory; Mick Nice; Steve Arrogant
- Website: http://www.special_duties.surf3.net

Special Duties are a British punk rock band from Colchester, Essex.

== History ==
Special Duties was created in October 1977 by schoolfellows Steve Green (Aka Arrogant), Steve Norris (Aka Duty) and Nigel Baker. They were punks at school, but the idea of forming their own band came when they saw The Adverts in Colchester. The fact that the three schoolboys couldn't play and didn't own any instruments didn't discourage them. They decided to put Arrogant on vocals, Duty on guitar and Baker on Bass. The band was originally going to be named X-pelled, but they switched to Special Duties when a box of around 200 badges with "Special Duties" printed on them which had been stolen from a school in Colchester came into their possession, the band deciding that they could save money on getting badges made by simply changing their name to match the stolen ones. For their debut live show, the band spread the word through the underground punk grapevine that they would be performing a free gig underneath the shopping precinct in Colchester. Hundreds of people turned up to see them play a fifteen-minute version of the only song they knew, "There'll Be No Tomorrow", performed in the Marks & Spencer loading bay. In 1980, Bart Povah joined the band and they recorded their first demo, which got them a record deal with Charnel House Records. The band moved to Rondelet Records soon after and recruited drummer Stuart Bray. Their second EP for the label, "Police State" spent two months in the indie chart, prompting Rondelet to get the band into the studio to record their debut album, 77 in 82.

In 1982 Arrogant decided to declare war on the anarcho-punk band Crass. Their debut LP was followed by their biggest selling single "Bullshit Crass", an attack on a band that they saw as destroying the traditional punk scene. It came with a Crass-style sleeve and the lead track began with chants of "Fight Crass, not punk", parodying one of Crass's songs. Green explained: "It was the fact that they said 'Punk was dead', and they played this really tuneless music. I saw them as almost a religious cult". However, after that, their music's leading distributors, Rough Trade and Small Wonder, refused to stock their material. This censorship made life a burden for the band. In 1983 they released the single "Punk Rocker" which was not well distributed. In the same year, the group broke up.

Twelve years later, Captain Oi! Records reissued 77 in 82, and encouraged by the response to it the band got back together, playing at 1995's Fuck Reading at the Brixton Academy. After that the group didn't split again.

In 1997 the band released "Wembley Wembley! (Wembley here we come)" to commemorate Colchester United reaching the final of that year's AutoWindscreens Shield at Wembley. Also on the CD was a version of "Up the U's!" a song written about the football club and still sung there today. The third track contained brief interviews with players, such as Garrett Caldwell, Joe Dunne and former club captain Karl Duguid.

In July 1998, the band travelled to New York for a gig at CBGB's, releasing the performance on the Live at CBGB's 1998 album.

In 2007 the band re-recorded the "Up the U's!" with local band Koopa with a song entitled "Stand Up For Col U" by Koopa and with the vocals of Colchester United players Jamie Cureton, Chris Iwelumo, Wayne Brown, Karl Duguid, Kevin Watson, Pat Baldwin, Kevin McLeod and Dean Gerken. The single was released to raise funds for the Teenage Cancer Trust.

In 2014 they signed to the Jailhouse Records label. which produced two discography releases. They began regularly gigging and recording, with multiple festival appearances, shows, and a U.S. tour planned for 2016 as well as a new studio record.

Since 2015, Special Duties have continued to perform and record as an active punk rock band. The band released 77 One More Time: Volume 2 in 2015, followed by the studio album 7 Days a Week, released on 5 November 2021 through Violated Records. The album contained 14 tracks and marked the band’s first new full length studio release for several years. In the 2020s, Special Duties have continued to appear at punk festivals and club dates in the United Kingdom, Europe and the United States.

== Discography ==
Chart placings shown are from the UK Indie Chart.

=== Albums ===
- '77 in '82 (1982) Rondelet (No. 15)
- '77 in '97 (1997) Captain Oi!
- Live at CBGBs (1998) Special Duties
- The Punk Singles Collection (1999)
- 77 One More Time: Volume 1 (2014) Jailhouse Records
- 77 One More Time: Volume 2 (2015) Jailhouse Records
- ’’ 7 Days a Week ‘’ (2021) Violated

=== Singles/EPs ===
- "Violent Society" b/w "Colchester Council" (1980) Charnel House
- "Violent Society" b/w "It Ain't Our Fault"/"Colchester Council" (1981) Ronndelet
- "Police State EP"' (1982) Rondelet (No. 23)
- "Bullshit Crass" b/w "You're Doing Yourself No Good" (1982) Rondelet (No. 7)
- "Punk Rocker" b/w "Too Much Talking" (1983) Expulsion (No. 37)
- "Mutt" b/w "London Town" (1996) One Stop
- "Judge and Jury"/"Shadow" (1997) (split with Red Flag 77)
- "Wembley! Wembley!" b/w "Up the U's!"/"Interview" (1997) Captain Colchester
- "Split with Violent Society" (1998) Soap And Spikes
- "MRR Rules"/"Lost Cause or Not" (1998) (split with The Creed)
- "I Wish It Could Be '77 EP" (1999) Data
- "Up the U's!" / "Stand Up For Col U" (2007) (Collaboration with Koopa)
