= Where's My Utopia? =

Studio album by Yard Act
- Released: 1 March 2024
- Studios: Role Model, Leeds; The Nave, Leeds; Parlour, Kettering; Metropolis, London
- Genres: Dance-punk; post-punk
- Length: 43:19
- Label: Island
- Producers: Yard Act; Remi Kabaka Jr.

Yard Act chronology
| The Overload (2022) | Where's My Utopia? (2024) | You're Gonna Need a Little Music (2026) |

Singles from Where's My Utopia?
- 1. "Dream Job" Released: 25 October 2023; 2. "Petroleum" Released: 30 November 2023; 3. "We Make Hits" Released: 15 January 2024; 4. "When the Laughter Stops" Released: 9 February 2024

Where's My Utopia? is the second studio album by British rock band Yard Act. It was released on 1 March 2024 via Island, and was preceded by four singles including "Dream Job" and "Petroleum". The album features a more disco-influenced sound than their debut, The Overload (2022).

== Background and release ==
In January 2022, Yard Act released their debut studio album, The Overload. It received an 85% score from Metacritic, peaked at number two on the UK Albums Chart and was nominated for the 2022 Mercury Prize. They released a standalone eight-minute single, "The Trench Coat Museum", on 13 July 2023 and teased more music was on the way.

On 25 October 2023, "Dream Job" was released as the lead single to the band's second album, with its title and release date unveiled the same day. Smith said the track was about the struggle of working in a suddenly successful band, and that "getting to do what you've wanted to do since you were a teenager doesn't actually solve your problems". The second single, "Petroleum", was released on 30 November, followed by "We Make Hits" on 15 January 2024, and "When the Laughter Stops" on 9 February.

In March 2024, Yard Act embarked on a tour across the United Kingdom, Europe and North America to promote the album.

== Composition ==
Speaking to NME, Yard Act frontman James Smith said that recording the album felt much more freeing compared to The Overload, and that they didn't feel bound by any musical restrictions. A departure from the post-punk sound of their previous work, Where's My Utopia? is a pop, "party album", inspired by disco. Smith said the band went "harder on the hooks and [have] crafted better songs."

== Critical reception ==
Professional ratings
Aggregate scores
| Source | Rating |
|---|---|
| AnyDecentMusic? | 8.0/10 |
| Metacritic | 86/100 |
Review scores
| Source | Rating |
| AllMusic | 4.5/5 stars |
| Clash | 8/10 |
| The Daily Telegraph | 5/5 stars |
| Dork | 5/5 stars |
| Exclaim! | 7/10 |
| NME | 4/5 stars |
| The Observer | 4/5 stars |
| Paste | 8.8/10 |
| Pitchfork | 7.5/10 |
| Rolling Stone | 4/5 stars |

Where's My Utopia? received widespread critical acclaim upon release. On review aggregator Metacritic, it has a score of 86 out of 100, based on seventeen reviews, citing "universal acclaim". Writing for AllMusic, Marcy Donelson called it a "[w]ry, riveting, chaotic, and infectious" album that "easily upstages what was an impressive debut". Giving the album a perfect score, Neive McCarthy for Dork called the album transformative, and that it showcased Yard Act "operating with unparalleled authenticity". She added that its introspective lyrics "give space to a complex tapestry of emotions", more so than their debut. For NME, critic Rishi Shah said Where's My Utopia? "tears down the very concept of genre", praising its exploration into various styles including disco and art rock. Ian Gormely of Exclaim! described the lyrical themes as universal and self-deprecating, without the band losing their "righteous fun that drew so many in in the first place".

=== Year-end lists ===
Select year-end rankings for Where's My Utopia?
| Publication/critic | Accolade | Rank | Ref. |
|---|---|---|---|
| AllMusic | AllMusic's 100 Favorite Albums of 2024 | unranked | |
| Double J | 50 Best Albums of 2024 | 14 | |
| Louder Than War | Top 100 Albums of 2024 | 75 | |
| Mondo Sonoro | Best International Albums of 2024 | 42 | |
| PopMatters | 80 Best Albums of 2024 | 30 | |
| Rolling Stone UK | 24 Best Albums of 2024 | unranked | |
| Rough Trade UK | Albums of the Year 2024 | 10 | |

== Track listing ==
All tracks are written by Yard Act. All lyrics by James Smith, except track 2 co-written by Ryan Needham.

Where's My Utopia? track listing
| No. | Title | Length |
|---|---|---|
| 1. | "An Illusion" | 3:36 |
| 2. | "We Make Hits" | 3:02 |
| 3. | "Down by the Stream" | 3:44 |
| 4. | "The Undertow" | 4:02 |
| 5. | "Dream Job" | 2:39 |
| 6. | "Fizzy Fish" | 3:30 |
| 7. | "Petroleum" | 3:39 |
| 8. | "When the Laughter Stops" (featuring Katy J Pearson) | 3:17 |
| 9. | "Grifter's Grief" | 3:19 |
| 10. | "Blackpool Illuminations" | 7:28 |
| 11. | "A Vineyard for the North" | 5:03 |
| Total length: | | 43:19 |

== Personnel ==
Musicians

- James Smith – lead vocals, backing vocals, programming, samplers, Mellotron, glockenspiel, contra bass
- Ryan Needham – bass, vocals, programming
- Sam Shipstone – guitars, backing vocals
- Jay Russell – drums, percussion, engineering, programming, synths, Mellotron, samplers, piano, backing vocals
- Katy J. Pearson – lead vocals (track 8)
- Chris Duffin – saxophones, flute, keys
- Remi Kabaka Jr. – percussion
- Zahra Benyounes – strings (tracks 1–4, 10–11)
- Guy Button – violins (tracks 1–4, 10–11)
- Francesca Gilbert – viola (tracks 1–4, 10–11)
- Maddie Cutter – cello (tracks 1–4, 10–11)
- Ian Stephens – string arrangements
- Rose Matafeo, Emma Sidi, Nish Kumar, David Thewlis – additional vocals
- Angel Silvera, Adeleye Omotaya, Rebecca Freckleton, Miss Petra Luke, Michelle Ndegwa – gospel choir (tracks 1, 4–5, 9, 11)
- Vaibhavi Krishna, Sara Ahmed, Alice Pinches, Mati Dickson, Bea Kendrew, Willow Carter, Kit Farrell, Iona Barton Reddington, Jemima Woodall – children choir (track 9)

Technical

- Remi Kabaka Jr. – producer
- Yard Act – producer
- Ross Orton – producer (track 5), mixing
- Jay Russell, Alex Greaves, Matt Peel, Russ Russell, Paul Norris, Harpaal Sanghera – engineers
- Ciaran Allan – engineer (track 5)
- Andy Hawkins – engineer (track 6)
- Matt Colton – mastering

Additional personnel

- Tom Robinson – cover artwork
- Ryan Needham – design layout

== Charts ==
Chart performance for Where's My Utopia?
| Chart (2024) | Peak position |
|---|---|
| Belgian Albums (Ultratop Flanders) | 156 |
| Belgian Albums (Ultratop Wallonia) | 176 |
| Scottish Albums (Official Charts) | 5 |
| UK Albums (Official Charts) | 4 |
