= The Ballistics =

British ska band

The Ballistics were a ska band from Ipswich, England. Formed in 2002, they have built up a healthy following across the UK and have garnered airplay in the U.S., Germany, Argentina and Brazil. The band's first album, Go Ballistic, was released in 2003 in a limited run and sold out quickly. A first full-length album, Allow Me To Demonstrate, was released in 2005. A second album, The Spirit Of Kelso Cochrane, was released late 2006. In early July 2009, The Ballistics announced they were splitting up. They played their final show on 12 September that year.

== History ==
The original line-up included former Red Flag 77 member, Glenn McCarthy, on vocals. He was joined by Mike Claydon (ex-Screaming Holocaust) on bass, Steve Pipe (ex-Stuntchild) on drums, Daz Hewitt on keyboards and Rich on guitar. This line-up recorded Go Ballistic in November 2003. Rich left for Nottingham at this time, and was replaced by Martyn Peck (a.k.a. 'Roki', ex-Optimum Wound Profile, Red Flag 77, Whiteslug, Raw Noise). This marked a significant shift in the band's sound. The original streetpunk style favoured by The Ballistics was slowly replaced by a sound more reminiscent of ska punk.

At this point the band started to venture further out of Ipswich for gigs, playing around the UK with bands such as The Beat, The Selecter, The Big, The Vibrators and Adequate Seven. In January 2005 the band began recording the Allow Me To Demonstrate album. Shortly after its release they were joined by Steve Satan, a trumpet player, and guitarist in the band The Devil Rides Out. Satan lasted until September 2005, when his departure coincided with the arrival of saxophone player, Tom Johnson.

Johnson's arrival prompted a further move away from the ska punk sound that the band had developed, towards a purer ska style. Newer additions to the set were influenced by 1960s ska, 2 Tone and mod-related music. Although the live shows contained older material, the songs written for the new album were once again different from what the band had done before.

In 2006, the brass section was further augmented by the addition of a second saxophone player, Graeme Cowey, and Mark Schorah on trumpet. The increased use of brass, on both the new and old material, made an impact on the overall sound of The Ballistics. This has resulted in the ska-influenced album, The Spirit Of Kelso Cochrane, which was released at the end of 2006. A fourth brass player, Tim Andrews, joined the band on trombone shortly before the release of this album. This nine-piece line-up recorded a cover version of the Ipswich Town song, "Come On The Town", in aid of MS causes in 2007. Shortly after this Johnson and Andrews left to pursue academic careers, though Johnson occasionally made an appearance.

In 2009 the band announced that they were splitting up. They played their last gig on 12 September 2009.

== Discography ==
- Go Ballistic CD (2003)
- Allow Me To Demonstrate CD (Dental Records 2005)
- All I Want For Xmas Is Abi Titmuss CDR (hand decorated limited edition 2006)
- The Spirit Of Kelso Cochrane CD (Dental Records 2006)
- Come On The Town (Edward Ebenezer) CD (ITISC 2007)
- All I Want For Christmas Is Abi Titmuss iTunes worldwide download (Dental Records 2008)

== Final line-up ==
- Glenn McCarthy - vocals
- Martyn Peck (Roki) - guitar (from 2003)
- Daz Hewitt - keyboards
- Mike Claydon - bass
- Steve Pipe - drums
- Graeme Cowey - alto / tenor saxophone (from 2006)
- Mark Schorah - trumpet (from 2006)

== Former members ==
- Rich Garner - guitar (2002–2003)
- Rambo - drums (2002)
- Steve Satan - trumpet (2005)
- Sax Steve - tenor saxophone (2007)
- Tim Andrews - trombone (2006–2007)
- Tom Johnson - tenor saxophone (2005–2008)
