= Extended Player One =

EP by Kids Near Water
- Released: January 15, 2001
- Recorded: Mushroom Studios, Southend, England
- Genre: Post-hardcore
- Label: Firefly Recordings
- Producer: John Hannon

Kids Near Water chronology
Extended Player One (2001)	There Is No I In Team (2001)

Professional ratings
Review scores
Source	Rating
Rate Your Music	3.96 stars on a 5 point scale

Extended Player One is the debut EP from Kids Near Water, as well as the band's first release on Firefly Recordings. The EP was recorded by former Understand member John Hannon in Essex across one weekend in September 2000 at Mushroom Studios, Southend. On its release the EP was awarded 5 K's in Kerrang! as well as receiving a favourable review in the NME. Monk Dave, Editor of the UK punk-zine Fracture described the release as "quite simply the best demo I have ever heard".

== Track listing ==
- All words and music by Kids Near Water
1. "Some Free Advice"
2. "When It Comes to You, I Step on Cracks"
3. "Post Scriptum"
4. "Telegram"
5. "Gone"

== Personnel ==
- Brian Reed – lead vocals, guitar
- Simon Joyce – guitars, vocals
- John Astbury – bass guitar
- Nik Finch – drums
- John Hannon – production
