= Grow Up (Desperate Journalist album) =

Studio album by Desperate Journalist
- Released: 24 March 2017
- Recorded: 2016
- Genre: Post punk, indie rock
- Length: 44:45
- Label: Fierce Panda
- Producer: Desperate Journalist, Keith TOTP

Desperate Journalist chronology
Good Luck EP (2015)	Grow Up (2017)	You Get Used To It EP (2018)

Singles from Grow Up
- 1. "Hollow" Released: October 2016; 2. "Resolution" Released: January 2017; 3. "Be Kind" Released: March 2017; 4. "Why Are You So Boring" Released: June 2017

Grow Up is the second album by London-based post punk band Desperate Journalist. It was released on 24 March 2017 on Fierce Panda Records. The first single, "Hollow", was released in October 2016. The second single, "Resolution", was released in January 2017 and has been playlisted on BBC Radio 6 Music. "Be Kind" was released as the third single in March 2017, just prior to the album's release. A fourth single, "Why Are You So Boring" was released in June 2017.

The band's singer Jo Bevan describes the album as being about "figuring out what being an adult is supposed to mean". The cover is a photograph of Bevan "at the start of [her] (ongoing) phase of teenage angst".

== Reception ==
Professional ratings
Aggregate scores
Source	Rating
AnyDecentMusic?	7.8/10
Metacritic	79/100
Review scores
Source	Rating
Drowned in Sound	8/10
Q	4/5 stars
Record Collector	4/5 stars
The Skinny	5/5 stars

Grow Up received positive reviews from critics upon release. On Metacritic, the album holds a score of 79/100 based on 6 reviews, indicating "generally favorable reviews".

== Track listing ==
All tracks are written by Desperate Journalist

No.	Title	Length
1.	"Hollow"	5:44
2.	"Resolution"	3:05
3.	"Be Kind"	3:40
4.	"All Over"	4:32
5.	"Purple"	4:25
6.	"Why Are You So Boring?"	2:35
7.	"Lacking in Your Love"	5:13
8.	"Your Genius"	4:10
9.	"I Try Not To"	3:37
10.	"Oh Nina"	4:21
11.	"Radiating"	3:23

== Personnel ==
Desperate Journalist

- Jo Bevan – vocals
- Robert Hardy – guitar, piano
- Simon Drowner – bass
- Caroline Helbert – drums, percussion, backing vocals

Production

- Desperate Journalist and Keith TOTP – production
- Jonny Solway – engineering
- Jonny Solway with Desperate Journalist – mixing
- Pete Maher – mastering

== B-sides ==
From "Hollow"

- "Hollow" (Medium Wave remix)

From "Resolution"

- "Bruce" (lyrics Springsteen)
