= Sons of the Pioneers (album) =

Studio album by The Workhorse Movement
- Released: June 6, 2000
- Recorded: 1999
- Studio: Overture Recording, Novi, Michigan
- Genre: Alternative metal; rap metal; funk rock; stoner rock
- Length: 47:24
- Label: Roadrunner; Overcore
- Producer: Scott Santos

The Workhorse Movement chronology
Rhythm and Soul Cartel (1998)	Sons of the Pioneers (2000)

Singles from Sons of the Pioneers
- 1. "Keep the Sabbath Dream Alive" Released: October 9, 2000

Sons of the Pioneers is the second and final studio album by American rock band The Workhorse Movement, released on June 6, 2000, through Roadrunner Records and Overcore Records. It was produced by Scott Santos, owner of Overcore Records, and was recorded at Overture Recording in Novi, Michigan. Primarily an alternative metal and rap metal release, the album's sound draws upon a variety of influences and music genres, including hip-hop, psychedelia, jazz, hard rock and stoner rock. The Workhorse Movement supported the album's release with touring of the United States and Europe, with shows supporting Sevendust, Kittie, Fishbone and Pitchshifter and on the Tattoo the Earth concert tour from July to August 2000.

Sons of the Pioneers received generally positive reviews from critics, particularly from those in the United Kingdom, who praised its musicianship and diverse blend of styles but criticized its lyrics and attitude. The album was featured in the end-of year critic's lists for Kerrang!, Metal Hammer and Rock Sound. "Keep the Sabbath Dream Alive" was released in Europe as the album's only single in October 2000, reaching 196 on the UK Singles Chart and receiving a nomination for "Outstanding National Single" at the 2001 Detroit Music Awards. In spite of the album's critical success, The Workhorse Movement would disband in December 2000.

== Background and recording ==
In 1995, The Workhorse Movement released their self-financed debut album, Dopamine. After touring with the likes of Sevendust, Skinlab and Vanilla Ice, The Workhorse Movement recruited a second vocalist, Cornbread (Chris Sparks), and signed with the local Detroit label Overcore Records. The band signed with Overcore on the basis that the label would help them attract the attention of larger record labels, and after releasing the Rhythm and Soul Cartel EP (1998), The Workhorse Movement signed with Roadrunner Records in 1999. The band then commenced recording their Roadrunner debut at Overture Recording in Novi, Michigan. Recording wrapped up around October 1999; the band then spent two months mixing the album. Scott Santos, the owner of Overcore Records, produced the album and mixed most of its tracks.

== Release and promotion ==
Before the release of the album, The Workhorse Movement were featured in Kerrang!'s "Hot 100" list in January 2000. The following month, the band toured across the United States as support for Sevendust, Kittie and Fishbone. After the album's release, the band participated in the first Tattoo the Earth tour on the second stage from July to August 2000.

Sons of the Pioneers was released internationally on June 6, 2000, through Roadrunner and Overcore Records. Due to the band's growing media presence over in Europe, The Workhorse Movement were asked to produce a music video for "Keep the Sabbath Dream Alive", which was filmed in Detroit in June 2000. On October 9, 2000, "Keep the Sabbath Dream Alive" was released as a single in Europe; it reached number 196 on the UK Singles Chart, and number seven on the UK Rock & Metal Singles Chart. The same month, The Workhorse Movement embarked on a three-week tour of Europe, in the hopes of funding the release of a single in the United States. The band's performances in Europe, particularly those the band did supporting Pitchshifter in the United Kingdom, solidified their reputation as a well-regarded live act. The band were due to tour with Clutch and Corrosion of Conformity when they returned to the United States, but at the end of the European tour, news came through that Roadrunner would be pulling their touring support. The Workhorse Movement subsequently disbanded on December 24, 2000, having performed their final show at the Harpos Concert Theatre in Detroit the day before.

== Critical reception ==
Professional ratings
Review scores
Source	Rating
AllMusic	4/5 stars
Classic Rock	4/5 stars
Kerrang!	4/5 stars
Melody Maker	4/5 stars
Metal Hammer	10/10
NME	5/10
Q	3/5 stars
Rock Hard	4/10

Sons of the Pioneers received generally positive reviews from critics, particularly those from the United Kingdom. Metal Hammer's Neil Kulkarni, who awarded the album a perfect 10 score, declared it the "album of the year", commenting: "Midway through 'Heavy's woozy riffola you realise just how far stoner rock is lagging behind the Workhorse Movement's instinctive psychedelic reach and knack for finding grooves wide enough to get lost in". David Peter Wesolowski of AllMusic praised the album's variety, and called it "top-shelf stuff when compared to other releases of its kind." Darren Sadler of Classic Rock enthusiastically noted the album's "fresh" and "enormous" sound and musicianship, and proclaimed that "The Workhorse Movement have re-invented rock music as we know it". Liam Sheils of Kerrang! noted Myron and Cornbread's vocal interplay and the album's "percussive, funky chops" and "delicate jazz licks", and called the album's sound "truly, spectacularly, [and] jaw-slackeningly original". Amy Sciarretto of CMJ New Music Monthly praised the album's energy, stating: "It will destroy, conquer and pillage everything in a 100-mile radius."

In a mixed review, NME criticized the album's lyrics: "An eloquent interpretation of nihilism is more difficult than perhaps [The Workhorse Movement] realise (token chorus – “I’m here to tell you that/Charley don’t surf/Uh Uh motherf–er wrong turf”), and until Workhorse come up with something a little more profound than that, they'll struggle to infiltrate the mainstream with the same kind of immediacy that bands like Slipknot and Korn have managed so successfully before them." Wolf-Rüdiger Mühlmann of Rock Hard called the album "dull and outdated". Exclaim! reviewer Roman Sokal was dismissive of the album, calling it "music that would be highly suitable for beer commercials, the anthemic ones that feature a generic rock guitar riff that is piped through a consumer grade amplifier, complete with alleyway mentality lyrics that are strained by hernia-yanking vocals sprawled on top."

=== Accolades ===
Sons of the Pioneers placed fourth, twelfth, and eighteenth on Metal Hammer's, Rock Sound's and Kerrang!'s respective end-of-year critics' lists for 2000. At the 2001 Detroit Music Awards, "Keep the Sabbath Dream Alive" was nominated for "Outstanding National Single", ultimately losing out to "The Real Slim Shady" by Eminem. In 2010, Metal Hammer would include Sons of the Pioneers on their "300 Albums You Must Hear Before You Die" list.

== Track listing ==
All tracks are written by The Workhorse Movement, except "Traffic", written by The Workhorse Movement and Esham.

No.	Title	Length
1.	"Workhorse & Intercourse"	1:48
2.	"Keep the Sabbath Dream Alive"	4:15
3.	"Livin' Evil"	3:17
4.	"Gimme Some Skin"	2:43
5.	"Zero"	3:08
6.	"Traffic" (featuring Esham)	4:47
7.	"Heavy"	5:24
8.	"Beotch"	2:12
9.	"Motown"	3:09
10.	"Joe Mama"	3:21
11.	"Charlie Don't Surf"	3:55
12.	"Cosmic Highway"	2:42
13.	"Mother Earth"	3:02
14.	"Feel Like Bob Marley"	3:41
Total length:		47:24

== Personnel ==
Adapted from liner notes.

The Workhorse Movement

- Myron – vocals
- Cornbread – vocals
- Freedom – guitar
- Pete Bever – bass
- Joe – drums

Additional personnel

- Esham – vocals (6)
- Laura Ruby – vocals (14)

Production

- Scott Santos – producer, engineering, mixing (1, 4–8, 10, 11, 14) (at Overture Recording)
- Tim Palatan – mixing (2, 3, 7, 9, 12–14) (at Overture Recording)
- Tom Baker – mastering (at Precision Mastering)
- Freedom – assistant engineer
