= Up the U's =

English football chant

Song
- Genre: football chant

"Up the U's" is a football chant regularly sung by fans of the English League Two football team Colchester United and is generally considered to be the club's anthem. It has also been recorded twice by local punk band and fans of the club, Special Duties.

== Lyrics ==
Up the U's, Up the U's, Up the good old white and blues,
When we get together what a game we'll see,
We're as strong as the old oak tree,
All for one and one for all,
We're football good and clean,
You can hear the crowd shout oh what a team,
Up the U's, up the U's, up the U's!

== Notable recordings ==
The song has been recorded twice by the Colchester-based punk band Special Duties. It originally appeared as a B-side to the song "Wembley! Wembley! (Wembley, here we come)" which was released in support of Colchester United reaching the final of the Auto Windscreens Shield. Both songs were included in a compilation of Special Duties' singles which was released in 2000. It was later re-recorded in 2006 to raise money for the Teenage Cancer Trust in memory of fan of the club, Emily Begg who had been suffering from leukemia and had died earlier that year aged fourteen. A version of the song by Colchester indie rock band Absent Kid is currently played at home games.

== See also ==
- Superfluous apostrophes
