= Go Ballistic =

Studio album by The Ballistics
- Released: 2003
- Label: The Point Records

Go Ballistic is the first CD release by Ipswich ska band, The Ballistics.

== Track listing ==
- This Is The UK
- Too Scared To Dance
- Burning Out
- F++k The Vote
- What Does It Take?
- All My Neighbours
- Go Ballistic
- One More Time (live)
- Easy Way Out (live)

== Band members ==
- Glenn McCarthy - vocals
- Daz Hewitt - keyboards / vocals
- Rich Garner - guitar
- Mike Claydon - bass
- Steve Pipe - drums
- Martyn Peck ('Roki') - guitar

== More information ==
The seven tracks that constitute the studio recordings were all written by The Ballistics. The live tracks are both covers. One More Time was originally recorded by The Clash. Easy Way Out was originally recorded by fellow Ipswich band, The Adicts.
