= Yard Act =

British rock band

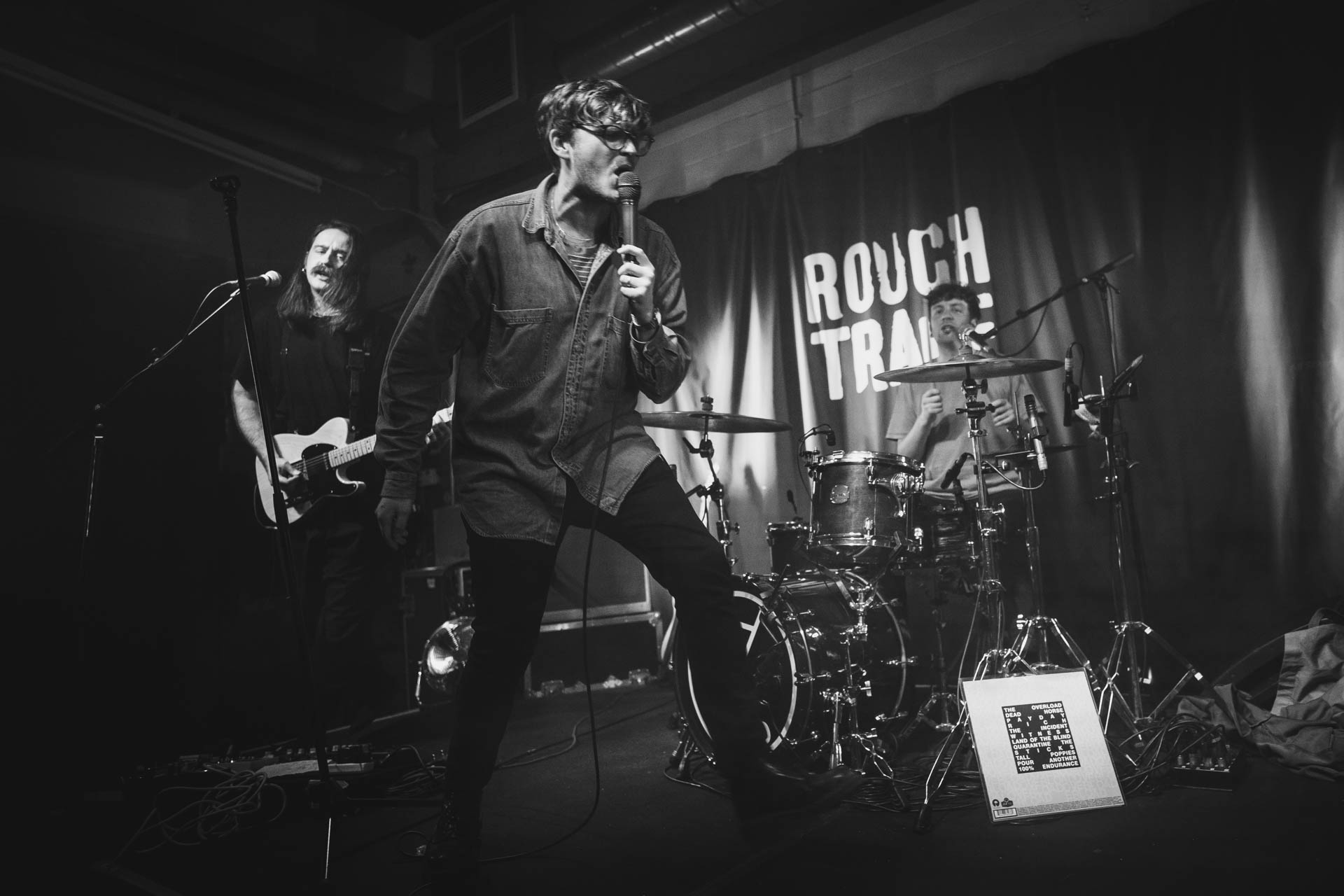
- Yard Act performing at Rough Trade East in London on 21 January 2022

Background information
- Origin: Leeds, West Yorkshire, England
- Genres: Post-punk; crank wave; indie rock
- Years active: 2019–present
- Labels: Island, Zen F.C.
- Members: James Smith; Ryan Needham; Sam Shipstone; Jay Russell
- Past members: Sammy Robinson; George Townend
- Website: www.yardactors.com

Yard Act is an English post-punk band from Leeds, West Yorkshire, formed in 2019. The band consists of James Smith (vocals, lyrics), Ryan Needham (bass), Sam Shipstone (guitar) and Jay Russell (drums).

The band's debut album, The Overload (2022), was released to widespread critical acclaim and debuted at No. 2 on the UK Albums Chart and was nominated for the Mercury Music Prize later that year. The band's second studio album, Where's My Utopia? (2024), expanded upon the band's musical palette and was produced by Gorillaz member Remi Kabaka Jr.. The band's third album, You're Gonna Need a Little Music (2026), was written, recorded, and performed as a live band.

== History ==
Prior to forming the band, vocalist James Smith and bassist Ryan Needham had both been members of other Leeds-based bands. Smith was a member of Post War Glamour Girls, and Needham played in Menace Beach, two bands that released a split EP together in 2016. After the release of the EP, the pair began discussing forming a band together, a plan that eventually came to fruition in September 2019, when the pair moved into a house together in Meanwood. They soon recruited guitarist Sammy Robinson and drummer George Townend who played together in Treeboy & Arc. Robinson later departed from the group, leading to the recruitment of Sam Shipstone, who previously played in Hookworms and Wonderswan. Prior to the announcement of their debut album, the band had only released a total of four singles independently. These singles were then compiled onto an EP, titled Dark Days (2021).

Their debut album, The Overload, was released on 21 January 2022. The group was "one to watch" in the BBC's Sound of 2022 shortlist. The group was also named one of Paste's "Best New Artists of 2021". On 1 July 2022, a re-recorded version of "100% Endurance" was released featuring a collaboration with Elton John.

Their second album, Where's My Utopia?, was released on 1 March 2024. The group released the single "Redeemer" in May 2026 as a single for their third album, You're Gonna Need A Little Music, which was released on 17 July 2026.

== Musical style ==
Critics have categorised the band's music as crank wave, post-punk and indie rock, often making use of elements of 1970s Italo disco, '90s hip-hop and early 2000s indie rock.

Their lyrics are ranted not sung, and often political, discussing opposition to topics including capitalism, gentrification and social class, told using "dark humour and cynical storytelling". Their lyrics also take a surrealist style, such as on the song "Payday" from their first album.

Yard Act have cited influences including Sleaford Mods, Gorillaz, Eminem, John Cooper Clarke, Parliament-Funkadelic, Violent Reaction, Eagulls, the Fall, Gang of Four, Arctic Monkeys, the White Stripes, Justice, Daft Punk, Sophie Ellis-Bextor, Manu Dibango and Glen Campbell. In a 2024 interview, called the Leeds music scene "a huge influence". In an interview with The Current he cited Leeds band the Wind-up Birds as having "an influence upon me that is not celebrated... Paul Ackroyd, their lyricist is up there for me with Ian Dury or Jarvis Cocker as one of the best British lyricists of all time. In a 2021 interview, Smith stated

We saw a bit of gateway out when Idles opened the floodgates, with Shame and Fontaines D.C. was the other big ones that came through. We kind of knew there was a scene for it again and probably thought, ‘well we can fucking do that, we know that’s not what we are’. We’ve said it in a few other interviews. We definitely Trojan Horsed it, to get a bit of attention of the back of some of those groups but knowing we were gonna subvert it and move away from it as soon as we can.

== Members ==
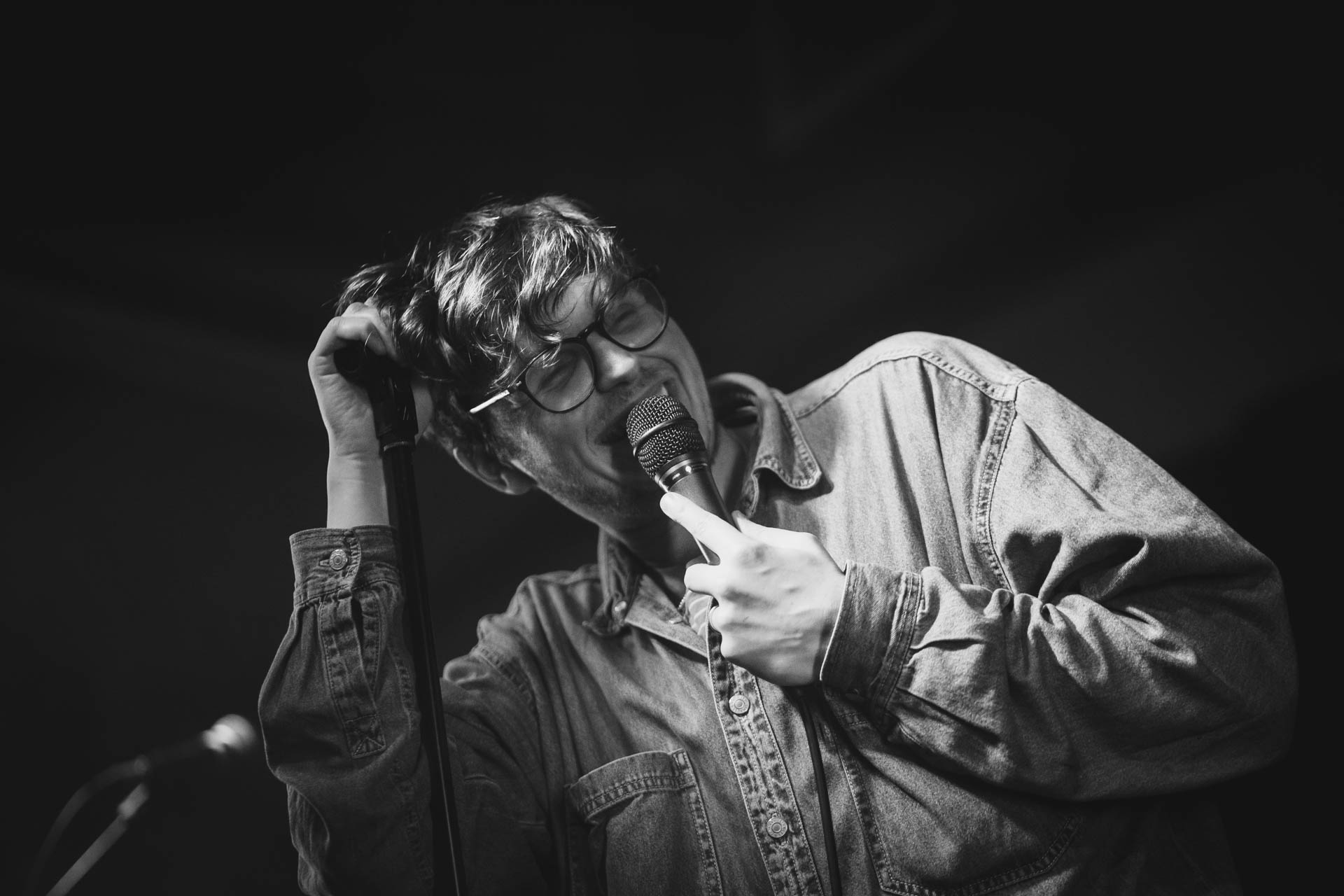
James Smith

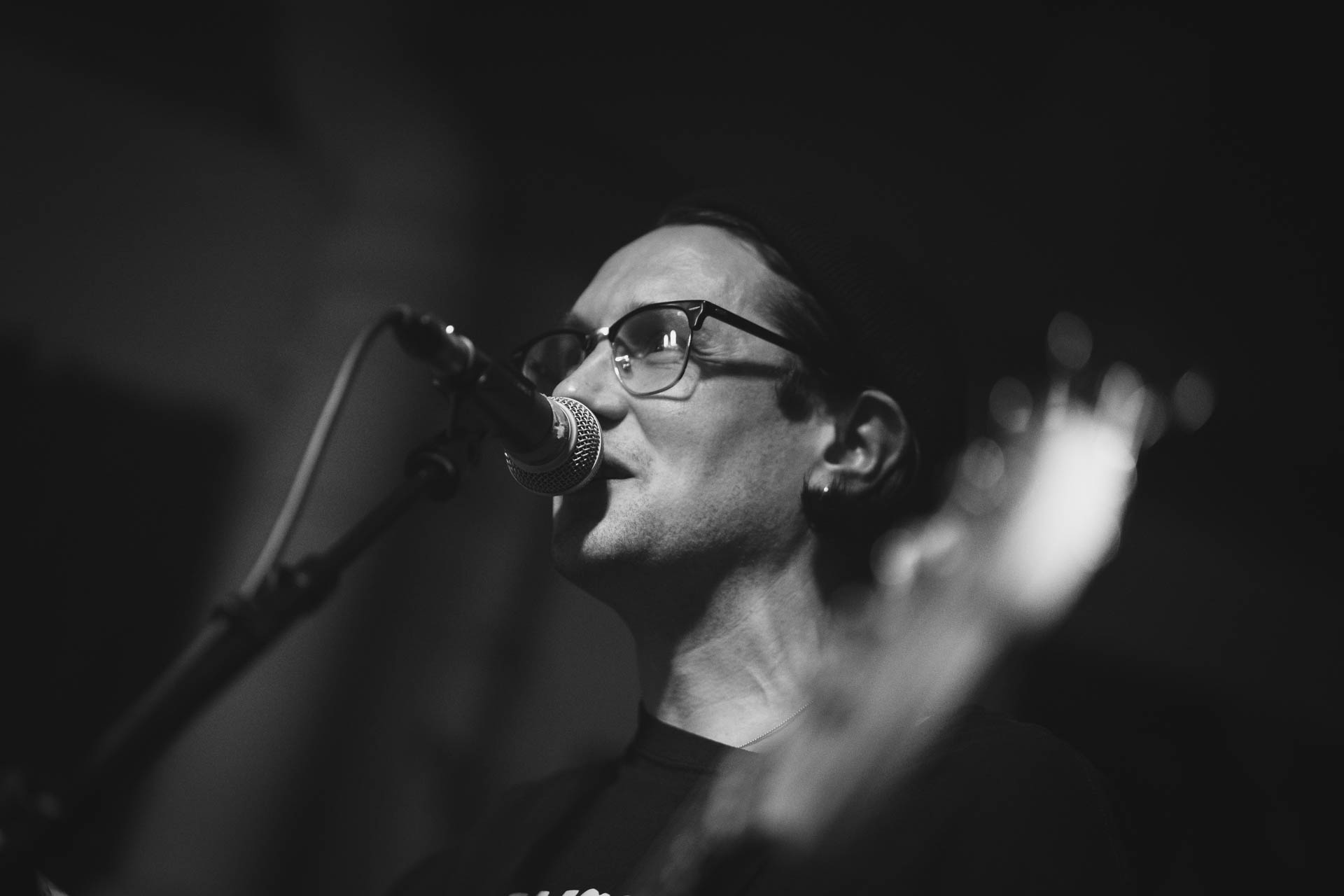
Ryan Needham

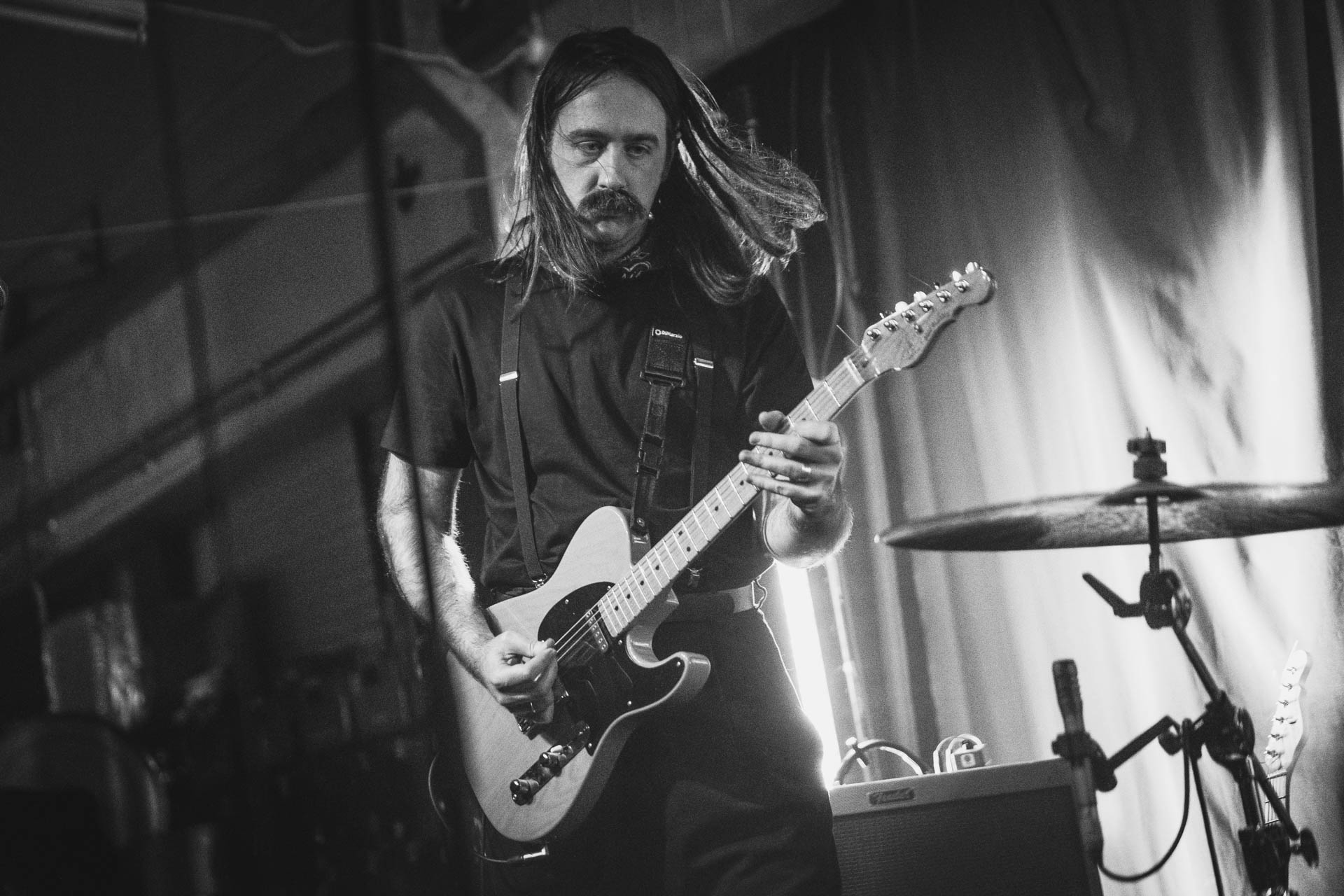
Sam Shipstone

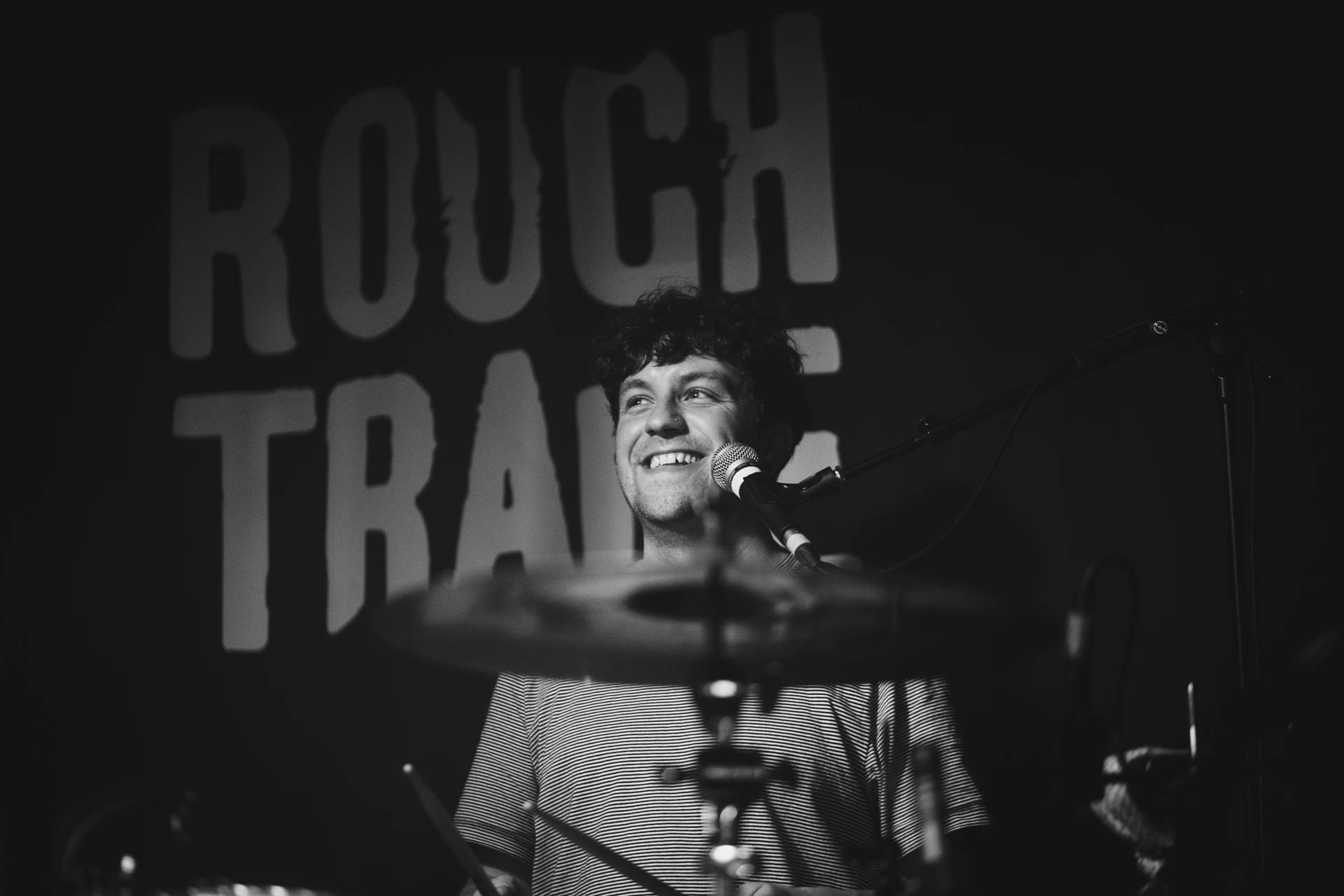
Jay Russell

Current members

- James Smith – lead vocals (2019–present)
- Ryan Needham – bass, backing vocals (2019–present)
- Sam Shipstone – guitar, backing vocals (2020–present)
- Jay Russell – drums, percussion (2020–present)

Current touring musicians

- Christopher Duffin – keyboards, percussion, saxophone, sampler (2022–present)

Former members

- Sammy Robinson – guitar (2019–2020)
- George Townend – drums (2019–2020)

Former touring musicians

- Daisy Smith – backing vocals, percussion, dancing (2024–2025)
- Lauren Fitzpatrick – backing vocals, percussion, dancing (2024–2025)

== Discography ==
Yard Act discography
- Studio albums: 3
- EPs: 2
- Singles: 14

=== Studio albums ===
List of studio albums, with selected details and chart positions
Title	Details	Peak chart positions			
Title	Details	UK	AUS	BEL (FL)	SCO
The Overload	Released: 21 January 2022; Label: Island, Zen F.C.; Formats: LP, CD, cassette, digital download, streaming	2	89	148	1
Where's My Utopia?	Released: 1 March 2024; Label: Island, Zen F.C.; Formats: LP, CD, cassette, digital download, streaming	4	—	156	5
You're Gonna Need a Little Music	Released: 17 July 2026; Label: Island; Formats: LP, CD, digital download, streaming	15	—	—	3

=== Extended plays ===
Title	Details
Dark Days	Released: 19 January 2021; Label: Zen F.C.; Formats: 12-inch vinyl, CD, cassette, digital download, streaming
100% Endurance (Elton John Version)	Released: 1 July 2022; Label: Universal Music Operations Limited; Formats: 7-inch vinyl, digital download, streaming

=== Singles ===
Title	Year	Album
"The Trapper's Pelts"	2020	Dark Days EP
"Fixer Upper"	2020	Dark Days EP
"Peanuts"	2020	Dark Days EP
"Dark Days"	2021	Dark Days EP
"The Overload"	2021	The Overload
"Land of the Blind"	2021	The Overload
"Payday"	2021	The Overload
"Rich"	2022	The Overload
"Pour Another"	2022	The Overload
"100% Endurance"	2022	The Overload
"The Trench Coat Museum"	2023	Non-album single
"Dream Job"	2023	Where's My Utopia?
"Petroleum"	2023	Where's My Utopia?
"We Make Hits"	2024	Where's My Utopia?
"When the Laughter Stops" (featuring Katy J Pearson)	2024	Where's My Utopia?
"Redeemer"	2026	You're Gonna Need a Little Music
"New Beginnings"	2026	You're Gonna Need a Little Music

== Accolades ==
Year	Association	Category	Nominated work	Result
2021	Anchor	Reeperbahn Festival International Music Award	Yard Act	Won
2022	NME Awards	Best New Act in the World	Yard Act	Nominated
2022	NME Awards	Best New Act from the UK	Yard Act	Nominated
2022	SXSW	Grulke Prize 'Developing Non-U.S. Act'	Yard Act	Won
2022	Mercury Prize	Album of the Year	The Overload	Shortlisted
