= Absent Kid =

English band

- Origin: Colchester, Essex, UK
- Genres: Alternative rock Indie rock
- Years active: 2002–present
- Label: Fierce Panda Records
- Members: Martin Williams (vocals); Richard Williams (guitar); Mark Butters (bass guitar); Kerri-Ann Butcher (guitar); Craig Jeal (drums and mash)
- Past members: Dominic Harrison (guitar); Chris McKeown (keyboard)
- Website: www.absentkid.co.uk

Absent Kid are a British indie rock band.

== History ==
Brothers Martin and Richard Williams and bassist Mark Butters grew up in the small coastal town of West Mersea. The name Absent Kid was inspired by a character in the cartoon South Park.

They debuted in front of a paying audience, performing at a Colchester venue, "Twist". The band developed as performers during a series of live performances, and gained a degree of prominence after opening for the now disbanded group Ikara Colt. This led to the band's first significant radio play, on XFM London.

In 2004, Absent Kid won the Diesel-U-Music award for Best Rock. An awards ceremony, held at nightclub Fabric, was broadcast on Channel 4. Absent Kid were awarded their trophy by BBC Radio 1 DJ Edith Bowman. This brought some attention from the national press, including the influential New Musical Express.

Absent Kid were afterwards signed by Fierce Panda Records, who had previously released records by, amongst others, Coldplay, Idlewild and Keane. The band's debut mini-album, I Burnt Down the Family Business, was released with Fierce Panda on 25 April 2005 to critical acclaim. Their double A-side debut single, Shame on Us All/Quiet Playground, was released on 6 February 2006.

The band gained less notoriety in the following year. They released their first full-length album in July 2007. While their previous works drew comparisons to Radiohead, the new album was hailed as more upbeat and made for the dancefloor.

In December 2009 the band announced a return after a year long hiatus with a new line-up with guitarist Kerri-Ann Butcher (formerly from Stand Still Kid) replacing Dominic Harrison.

April 2010 saw Absent Kid record a version of Up the U's for local football club Colchester United which is now played at home games at the club's Weston Homes Community Stadium.

== Discography ==
- Scatter Photos and Relive Bloodloss (EP)
- I Burnt Down the Family Business (25 April 2005)
- Shame on Us All / Quiet Playground (6 February 2006)
- Misadventure (July 2007)
