= Capital (band) =

Capital are an indie rock band, formerly signed to Fierce Panda Records from Eastbourne, East Sussex. Comprising Nick Webb (vocals), Joel Roberts (keys) and Mike Dawson (guitar), the rhythm section was James Moir (bass) and Daniel Thorpe (drums), but now that duty is shared between session musicians.

== History ==
Roberts and Webb had been writing and recording music together since the age of 14, having been influenced by a variety of their fathers' record collections which included many bands from Motown and progressive rock. The desire for self production started immediately with Robert's garden shed being transformed into a control room but this could only contain a five-piece for so long, and eventually they built their own studio in the town centre, which was situated above a curry house and below a tattoo parlour.

Having previously been called Fracture, Foxhead and Passengers, the band decided to settle with a synth rock sound and in early 2008 caught the attention of Simon Williams (who had found and released Coldplay and Keane's first material). With Williams the name Capital was decided. They have been tour support for Athlete and The Airborne Toxic Event. Huw Stevens selected them to play at Latitude Festival; and BBC 6 music's invited them in for an interview and plug of their single Bright Lights.

Signing with Fierce Panda Records, the band released the mini album Days & Nights of Love & War in 2009. It was well received by the British music press. Q magazine stated they possessed a swagger even Brandon Flowers may come to envy.

After splitting with their manager over a conflict of musical direction for their debut album, they decided to self-release Force Is Not a Remedy as a free download in 2010.
