= Kids Near Water =

- Origin: Exeter, England, UK
- Genres: Emo, post hardcore, rock
- Years active: 2000–2005
- Labels: Firefly, Fierce Panda
- Past members: Simon Joyce; Brian Read; Nik Finch; John Astbury
- Website: Official website

Kids Near Water were an English emo, punk and hardcore band from Exeter, England, (featuring ex-members of Annalise and Clinch) who formed in late 2000. The band was composed of lead vocalist and guitarist Brian Read, guitarist and vocalist Simon Joyce, bassist John Astbury and drummer Nik Finch. Kids Near Water released two studio albums, two studio EPs and appeared on several split EPs and compilations.

== History ==
The band initially formed to play one single show and sneak into Millennium celebrations hosted by Exeter Cavern Club for free. Although they had no name at the time, the group appeared at the event unbilled and ended their set proclaiming "Thanks a lot Exeter, we've been YOUNG CHURCH!". After the show they decided to continue and changed their name to Kids Near Water.

=== Extended Player One, Mosh & Go and There Is no I In Team EPs (2000-2001) ===
Signed to Firefly Recordings their debut EP, Extended Player One being the label's first release. The EP was recorded by former Understand member John Hannon in Essex and was awarded 5 K's in Kerrang! as well as a favourable review in NME. Monk Dave, Editor of the UK punk-zine Fracture described the release as "quite simply the best demo I have ever heard". In October 2001, the band's track "Distance Over Time" appeared alongside Jimmy Eat World, Stapleton and San Quentin on the Fierce Panda Records release Mosh & Go. The band's third release was recorded by former PJ Harvey producer Head in Glastonbury, Somerset and released by Firefly Recordings in November 2001. The same year, the band toured with the punk band Elliot, opened the Concrete Jungle stage at the Reading Festival in August and ended the year with a home-town Christmas show at the Exeter Cavern Club. The show was dubbed the 'Freakscene KKKKKristmas party' because the line up, which also included Exeter punk bands Tyler and Shoe! had each scored high marks with their debut releases in Kerrang! magazine that year.

=== ¡Hey Zeus! (2003) ===
The band's debut album, recorded by John Hannon was released by Firefly Recordings in 2003.

=== Cave Bear Is Flying Panda LP and 'Kids Near Water / The Coalfield / America Is Waiting' split EP (2005) ===
The band appeared on a three-way split release with The Coalfield and America Is Waiting ahead of their second album. The band have become seemingly inactive since the release of the album Cave Bear Is Flying Panda in early 2005 and members have not continued musical projects since. Artwork for the release was done by former 2000 AD artist Shaky Kane.

== Touring ==
The band toured with Hundred Reasons, Garrison, Hell Is For Heroes and played shows with Fugazi, Sum 41, Dead Inside, Copperpot Journals, Jerry Built, Tyler, Shoe! Chariots, Ursa Scuttle, Capdown, and Cat on Form.

== Discography ==
- Extended Player One (EP) (2001)

1 Some Free Advice 2 When It Comes To You, I Step On Cracks 3 Post Scriptum 4 Telegram 5 Gone

- Mosh & Go (2001)

1 Jimmy Eat World - A Praise Chorus 2 San Quentin - Six Seconds 3 Stapleton - Acres And Yards 4 Kidsnear Water - Distance Overtime 5 Jetplane Landing - What The Argument Has Changed 6 Econoline - Topology 7 Seafood - Guntrip 8 Twist - Dent 9 Caffeine - Love Can Wait 10 Parkinsons, The - Bad Girl 11 Suffrajets, The - Universal Superstar 12 Tung - Kidney Failure 13 Reuben - Wooden Boy 14 Elviss - De-Change 15 Caretaker - Hidden Agenda 16 Hundred Reasons - Slow Learner

- There Is No I In Team (EP) (2001)

1 This Machine Kills 2 Starting Time 3 Queen And Three 4 Distance Over Time 5 Anniversary

- ¡Hey Zeus! (LP) (2003)

1 Bad Day Contest 2 ..... And The Horse You Rode In On, 3 Forward Thinking 4 And We Two Were Lost 5 The Answer Is Never 6 Congratulations On A Job Well Done 7 Speaker Wire 8 Pleasant Morning Thoughts 9 Token 10 Be Careful

- Kids Near Water, The Coalfield, America Is Waiting (2005)

1 Kids Near Water - They Wiping Us Out 2 Kids Near Water - Practice Our Miracles 3 Kids Near Water - If You Only Knew 4 America Is Waiting - Sympathy For Rome 5 America Is Waiting - Separation Between 6 America Is Waiting - We'll Hammer These Swords Into Guitars 7 Coalfield, The - Portrait Receiver 8 Coalfield, The - Isolation & Tragedy 9 Coalfield, The - Perfect Fusion

- Cave Bear Is Flying Panda (LP) (2005)

1 So This Is How It Begins 2 Bang After Bang After Bang After Bang After Bang 3 Theme Song Of Master Yoo 4 By Any Means Necessary 5 Who Watches The Watchers? 6 Surveying The Scene 7 The Known Unknown 8 The Wrong 9 A Brief Word Of Warning 10 And This Is How It Ends

- Play Dead fanzine compilation, featuring Get Cape. Wear Cape. Fly, This Aint Vegas (2005)
