= The Overload =

Studio album by Yard Act
- Released: 21 January 2022
- Recorded: 2021
- Genre: Art rock; art punk; no wave; post-punk
- Length: 37:09
- Label: Island
- Producer: Ali Chant

Yard Act chronology
Dark Days (2021)	The Overload (2022)	Where's My Utopia? (2024)

Singles from The Overload
- 1. "The Overload" Released: 7 September 2021; 2. "Land of the Blind" Released: 28 October 2021; 3. "Payday" Released: 23 November 2021; 4. "Rich" Released: 7 January 2022; 5. "Pour Another" Released: 21 January 2022; 6. "100% Endurance" Released: 18 May 2022

The Overload is the debut studio album by British rock band Yard Act. The album was released on 21 January 2022 through Island Records. The album was nominated for the 2022 Mercury Prize.

== Background and recording ==
The album was written and recorded in 2021.

== Release and promotion ==
=== Singles ===
Five singles were released on The Overload from late 2021 to early 2022. The self-titled track, "The Overload" was released on 7 September 2021. The second single, "Land of the Blind", was released on 28 October 2021. "Payday" was released on 23 November 2021. The two 2022 singles were "Rich" and "Pour Another".

=== Music videos ===
Corresponding with the single, the music video for the track "The Overload" was released on the band's Vevo on 7 September 2021. The video features the band performing at a Car Boot Sale. The video was directed by James Slater. Slater also directed the music videos for their second and fourth singles, "Land of the Blind" and "Rich", respectively. In an interview with DIY, lead singer James Smith notes, "I had the idea for a music video in which a magician does tricks but everybody keeps applauding. I thought it was too on the nose to be a decent satire but I’ve been subtle in the past and nobody has picked up on it so this time I thought we would just be blunt. James [Slater] developed the idea and came up with the concept of the magician holding the cafe hostage via hypnosis."

== Critical reception ==
Professional ratings
Aggregate scores
Source	Rating
AnyDecentMusic?	8.2/10
Metacritic	85/100
Review scores
Source	Rating
Clash	9/10
The Daily Telegraph	4/5 stars
DIY	5/5 stars
Dork	5/5 stars
The Guardian	4/5 stars
The Irish Times	4/5 stars
MusicOMH	4.5/5 stars
NME	4/5 stars
Pitchfork	7.4/10
Under the Radar	9/10

The Overload received widespread critical acclaim upon its release. On review aggregator website, Metacritic, The Overload has an average rating of 85 out of 100, indicating "universal acclaim" based on 17 critic reviews. Additionally, on AnyDecentMusic? the album holds an 8.2 out of 10 rating.

== Track listing ==
All tracks are written by James Smith, Ryan Needham, Sam Shipstone, and Jay Russell.

The Overload track listing
No.	Title	Length
1.	"The Overload"	3:17
2.	"Dead Horse"	3:38
3.	"Payday"	2:54
4.	"Rich"	3:43
5.	"The Incident"	3:10
6.	"Witness (Can I Get A?)"	1:21
7.	"Land of the Blind"	3:00
8.	"Quarantine the Sticks"	2:40
9.	"Tall Poppies"	6:21
10.	"Pour Another"	3:20
11.	"100% Endurance"	3:45
Total length:		37:09

== Charts ==
Chart performance for The Overload
Chart (2022)	Peak position
Australian Albums (ARIA)	89
Belgian Albums (Ultratop Wallonia)	148
Scottish Albums (OCC)	1
UK Albums (OCC)	2
