= Union Kid =

British rock band

- Origin: Braintree, Essex UK
- Genres: Indie rock Alternative rock
- Years active: 1997-2001
- Labels: 1970 Recordings
- Past members: Sean Tuohy; Simon Dobson; Mark Keates

Union Kid were a British indie rock group formed in Braintree, Essex in the late 1990s by Sean Tuohy (guitar/vocals), Mark Keates (drums), and Simon Dobson (bass).

== History ==
Established in 1997, Union Kid described Braintree as the "punk rock capital of the world", partly in reference to the burgeoning local music scene at the time, and also because of the attention Braintree's The Prodigy had brought the town following their 1996 breakthrough.

Union Kid's musical style has been compared to The Replacements and Fugazi, with their sound described by the NME as "taut, tight, tense and superbly overmuscled post-hardcore punk rock’n’roll." The trio released material under their own record label, 1970 Recordings.

They came to the attention of the music press in 1999 with the release of their debut single "Fort Disney", which the NME called a "a twisted tribute to The Beach Boys’ ‘California Girls’ with extra souped-up guitars and a chorus the size of Weston-Super-Mare". They released two further EPs that year: "Here Comes Chunk...", and "He Is Mono". 1999 additionally saw the first of two Peel Sessions, recorded at Maida Vale Studios and broadcast on BBC Radio 1. They also appeared on Steve Lamacq's Evening Session.

Union Kid released their only album, the self-produced Candy Falls Here in August 2000. Recorded at the Cookie Palace and again released on 1970 Recordings, the album received positive reviews from NME and Drowned In Sound, who called it "possibly one of the debuts of the year so far." Candy Falls Here appeared on NME's Highest Rated Albums of the 2000s list. The album spawned three singles, "3% Seattle", "The Test", and "Triple A".

The band split after recording their second John Peel session in 2001.

== Discography ==
=== Albums ===
- Candy Falls Here (2000)

=== Singles and EPs ===
- "Fort Disney" (1999)
- "Here Comes Chunk..." (1999)
- "He Is Mono" (1999)
- "3% Seattle" (2000)
- "The Test" (2000)
- "Triple A" (2000)

=== Appearances on Compilations ===
- "Incoming + Convert" appears on Essex; 7" double vinyl compilation EP from Plastic Cowboy Recordings (2000)
