= Submarine (band) =

- Origin: London, England
- Genres: Psychedelic rock, noise pop, indie rock, space rock, experimental rock, neo-psychedelia, avant pop
- Years active: 1992–1995
- Labels: Ultimate, Taky Recordings

The early-mid-1990s English band Submarine followed in the footsteps of many of its contemporaries, including The Flaming Lips, Mercury Rev, Boo Radleys and My Bloody Valentine with its own vision of noise pop, before morphing into Jetboy DC, which continues sporadically to this day.

== History ==
The band released their self-titled debut album in 1994, produced by Keith Cleversley (of Flaming Lips fame), and released by Ultimate. A second album, also recorded with Cleversley, was turned down by the label & later released on Taky Recordings, nearly 10 years later. Kiss Me Till Your Ears Burn Off, a compilation of singles and B-sides, was released on the Fantastick Records label.

Submarine recorded two separate Peel Sessions for BBC presenter John Peel's radio show, in 1993 and 1994.

During their career, Submarine toured extensively with such bands as the Flaming Lips, Moose, Radiohead, Peach and Tool. Beginning in 1993, Submarine participated in the Ultimate Records Tour with the Werefrogs & Sidi Bou Said.

Around 1995, Submarine disbanded, with Neil Haydock (guitar, vocals) and Rob Harron (bass) forming Jetboy DC. Jetboy DC membership also included Rob Havis (Drums) and Damien Meade (Guitar).

According to Allmusic, Submarine "alternated introspective indie-rock with noisy psychedelic jams".

== Submarine membership ==
- Neil Haydock – guitar, vocals
- Rob Harron – bass
- Robert Havis – drums (from 1994) (former member of Peach)
- Nathan Gelinas
- Jeff Townsin – drums (currently of Sophia, also drummer for Madam)

== Discography ==
- Submarine (1994), Ultimate
- Kiss me till your ears burn off (1994), Fantastick
- The Slow Motion World of Submarine (2003), Taky
- She Don't Like the Bee-Gees (2007), Taky
- Camp Freddie (2007), Taky
