= Optimum Wound Profile =

British industrial metal band

- Origin: Ipswich, England
- Genres: Industrial metal, hardcore punk
- Years active: 1991–1996
- Labels: Roadrunner, We Bite Records, Metal Mind Productions
- Past members: Phil Vane; Simon Finbow; Martyn Peck aka Roki; Ian Barnard; Jason Whittaker; Snapa Harvey; Dom Cattermole; Niall Corr
- Website: Optimum Wound Profile myspace page

Optimum Wound Profile were an industrial metal band from Ipswich, England, active between the years 1991-1996. Combining elements of metal, crust punk, and sampling/programming technologies they released three albums and toured across Europe.

Formed in 1991 by guitarist Roki and vocalist Phil Vane, the pair quickly recruited Simon Finbow (vocals) and Ian Barnard (bass), followed by Dom Cattermole on drums. Picked up by an Ipswich promoter shortly after forming, the band entered the studio in the middle of 1991 to record two demos. On the strength of these OWP signed to Roadrunner Records at the end of the year.

Optimum Wound Profile's first album, Lowest Common Dominator, was released in the summer of 1992, and received positive reviews in Kerrang! and other music press. Featuring Niall Corr on drums, who had replaced the departed Dom Cattermole, the band's sound at this point was a hybrid of hardcore punk and industrial metal. A successful European tour, with Jason Whittaker of Whiteslug replacing Snapa Harvey, followed the release before the band returned to the UK to begin work on the follow-up.

Silver Or Lead was released in mid-1993 to much critical acclaim, and entered the UK Rock Chart at number 11, where it stayed for several weeks. This album saw the band's sound take a much more metal turn. By this stage all of the drums were programmed. The album was produced by Colin Richardson, who has worked with Slipknot, Machine Head and Bullet For My Valentine among a host of others. Another successful European tour followed, but Roadrunner Records declined the option of a third album.

In 1994, OWP signed to We Bite Records and in January 1995 released Asphyxia. Having parted company with Phil Vane, all vocals were provided by Simon Finbow. The album was the band's most critically acclaimed release to date.

Optimum Wound Profile spent two years after the release of Asphyxia writing a fourth album, 'Cult Of Saints 1425'. Only demo versions of these songs exist as the band decided to split up in 1996.

In 2007, Metal Mind Productions licensed the first two OWP albums from Roadrunner Records for re-release in August the same year.

Late in 2007 Optimum Wound Profile reformed with former members Simon, Roki and Jason being joined by Barnie Mills (bass) and Malcolm Peck (drums), to concentrate on the unreleased Cult Of Saints album. The band entered the recording studio for the first time in twelve years in spring 2008 to record demos. The project has since been put on hold.

Roki (Martyn Peck), Simon Finbow, Dom Cattermole and Mark Schorah now play in post-rock band These Are End Times. Phil Vane continued to sing for Extreme Noise Terror until his death in February 2011. Jason Whittaker and Martyn Peck also run Antigen Records, whose roster includes Henry Homesweet, The Waxing Captors, John Callaghan, Earth Mother F*cker, These Are End Times, Sealionwoman, Jack Rundell and Optimum Wound Profile.

== Discography ==
- Lowest Common Dominator CD, LP, Cassette (Roadrunner Records 1992)
- Silver or Lead CD, LP (Roadrunner Records 1993)
- Asphyxia CD (We Bite Records 1995)
- 'Cult of Saints 1425' unreleased
- Lowest Common Dominator - remastered Gold CD (Metal Mind Productions 2007)
- Silver or Lead - remastered Gold CD (Metal Mind Productions 2007)

== Band members ==
- Simon Finbow - vocals (1991–present). See also: Chocolate, These Are End Times.
- Martyn Peck (aka Roki) - guitar / programming (1991–present). See also: Raw Noise, Whiteslug, Conspiracy Of Noise, These Are End Times.
- Jason Whittaker - samples / programming (1993–present). See also Whiteslug.
- Phil Vane - vocals (1991–1994). See also: Extreme Noise Terror, Napalm Death, Conspiracy Of Noise.
- Ian Barnard - bass (1991–1996).
- Niall Corr - drums (1992–1993).
- Dom Cattermole - drums (1991–1992). See also These Are End Times.
- Snapa Harvey - samples / programming (1991–1992). See also Deviated Instinct.
- Barnie Mills - bass (2007–2008).
- Malcolm Peck - drums (2007–2008). See also Red Flag 77.
- Mark Schorah - trumpet (2008). See also: The Ballistics, These Are End Times.
