= Beans On Toast =

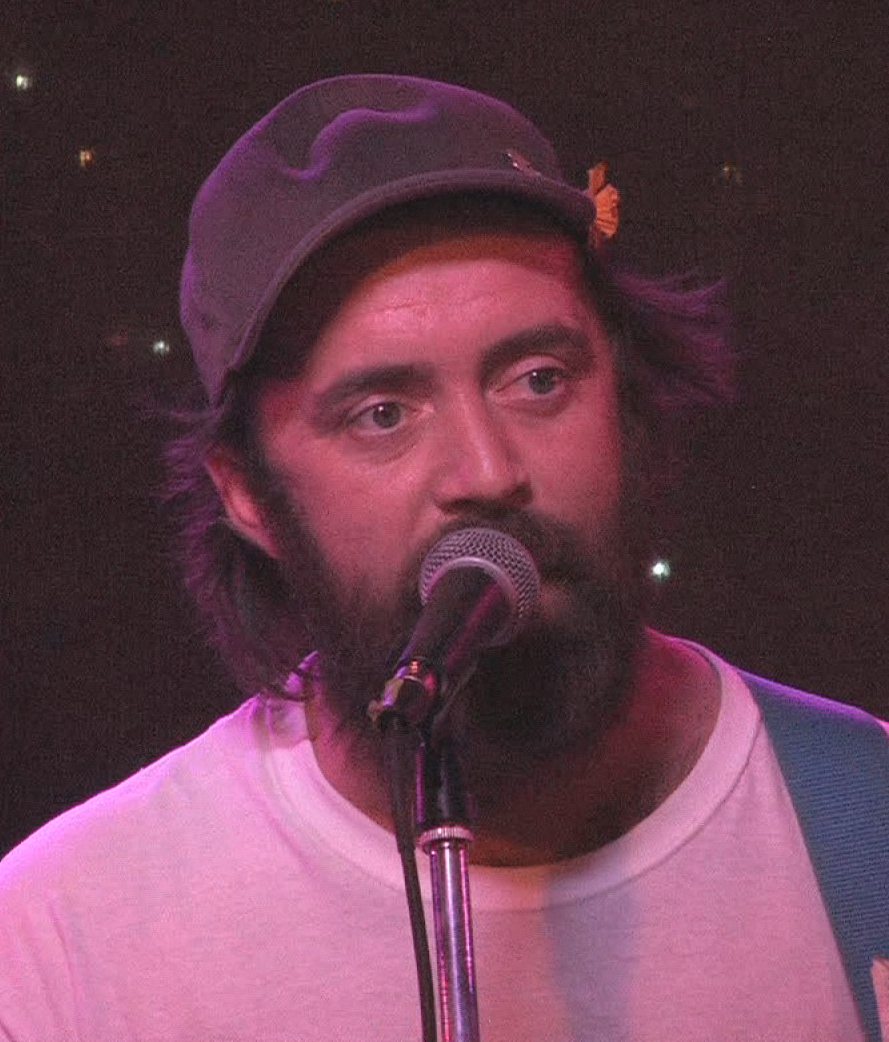
- Beans on Toast at Knuckleheads Saloon in Kansas City, Missouri

Background information
- Born: 1 December 1980 (age 45); Braintree, Essex, England
- Genres: Folk; alternative rock; antifolk; soft rock; pop rock; folk rock; comedy rock
- Occupation: Singer-songwriter
- Label: Xtra Mile
- Website: beansontoastmusic.com

Jay McAllister, known by his stage name Beans On Toast, is a British folk singer-songwriter from Braintree, Essex, England, who rose to prominence out of the UK folk scene in 2005. Beans on Toast has released fifteen studio albums, traditionally releasing a new record each year on 1 December, McAllister's birthday.

== Early life ==
Jay McAllister was born in Epping on 1 December 1980 and grew up in Braintree, Essex. He has one older brother. McAllister attended the Notley High School where he formed the band Jellicoe in 1996. Jellicoe released one studio album before splitting up in 2001; around this time McAllister moved from Essex to North London.

== Career ==
McAllister started performing as Beans On Toast in London in 2005, primarily at the Holloway Road pub Nambucca, where he lived and worked at the time.

Beans On Toast has performed at the Glastonbury Festival every year since 2007. He supported Kate Nash at London's Hammersmith Apollo in 2008, before releasing his debut 50-track double album Standing On A Chair in 2009. Produced by Ben Lovett of Mumford & Sons, it featured guest vocals by Emmy The Great, Frank Turner and members of The Holloways, amongst others.

Along with Ian Grimble, Beans On Toast produced 2010 follow-up Writing on the Wall. Both albums were well-received and gained positive reviews in the Sunday Times and the Mirror, alongside airplay on 6Music, Xfm, and Radio 1 and 2. Later that year, Beans On Toast played in the Westway Round the UK Tour, the first national tour by Strummerville bands.

Beans On Toast's third album, Trying to tell the Truth, was released in 2011 and produced by Frank Turner, with Beans On Toast going on to be the support act for Turner's sold out Wembley Arena show in April 2012.

A fourth studio album, Fishing for a Thank You, was released in 2012 with production work by Lee Smith and Jamie Lockhart. During this period, Beans On Toast also headlined a sold-out Scala show in Kings Cross, London, which was captured and released as the Live at Scala album in 2013. His fifth album, Giving Everything, was released on 1 December 2013, and made it into the top ten of the iTunes Singer-Songwriter Chart.

In 2014, Beans On Toast performed to a crowd of over 100,000 in one week while opening Frank Turner's UK stadium tour. In the same year, he embarked upon his first American tour, playing headline shows as well as several dates with Irish-American punk band Flogging Molly. A limited edition 10" was released in the UK entitled Best of Toast Pressed on a Vinyl for Record Store Day 2014 in April. This led to a sixth studio album, The Grand Scheme of Things, followed by a UK tour.

Throughout 2015, Beans On Toast toured the UK and US, as well as playing one-off shows in the Netherlands, Germany, and South America. He kicked off the year touring America before returning to the UK for an "Off the Road" tour, visiting smaller venues in the UK. Beans On Toast also toured during the festival season, appearing at YNOT Festival, Boomtown, and the Glastonbury Festival, amongst others. In mid-September, he followed long-time friend and producer Frank Turner on his headline tour of America. In December 2015, Beans On Toast released a seventh album, Rolling Up A Hill, recorded in Kansas with Truckstop Honeymoon.

In 2016, Beans On Toast again completed his usual touring schedule, including North America, two UK tours, and a number of other shows worldwide. On his main UK tour in November and December, he had two main support acts, SkySmeed, an American country singer and Tensheds, a piano bashing duo. On 1 December, he released his eighth album, A Spanner in the Works, which was recorded over one weekend on a laptop, straying away from a typical Beans On Toast album with no guitar being used, except on the track "2016", one of the singles from the album.

On 1 December 2017, Beans On Toast released his ninth studio album, Cushty, followed in 2018 by his first book Drunk Folk Stories, a collection of ten, short, true-life stories about songwriting, travelling and drinking.

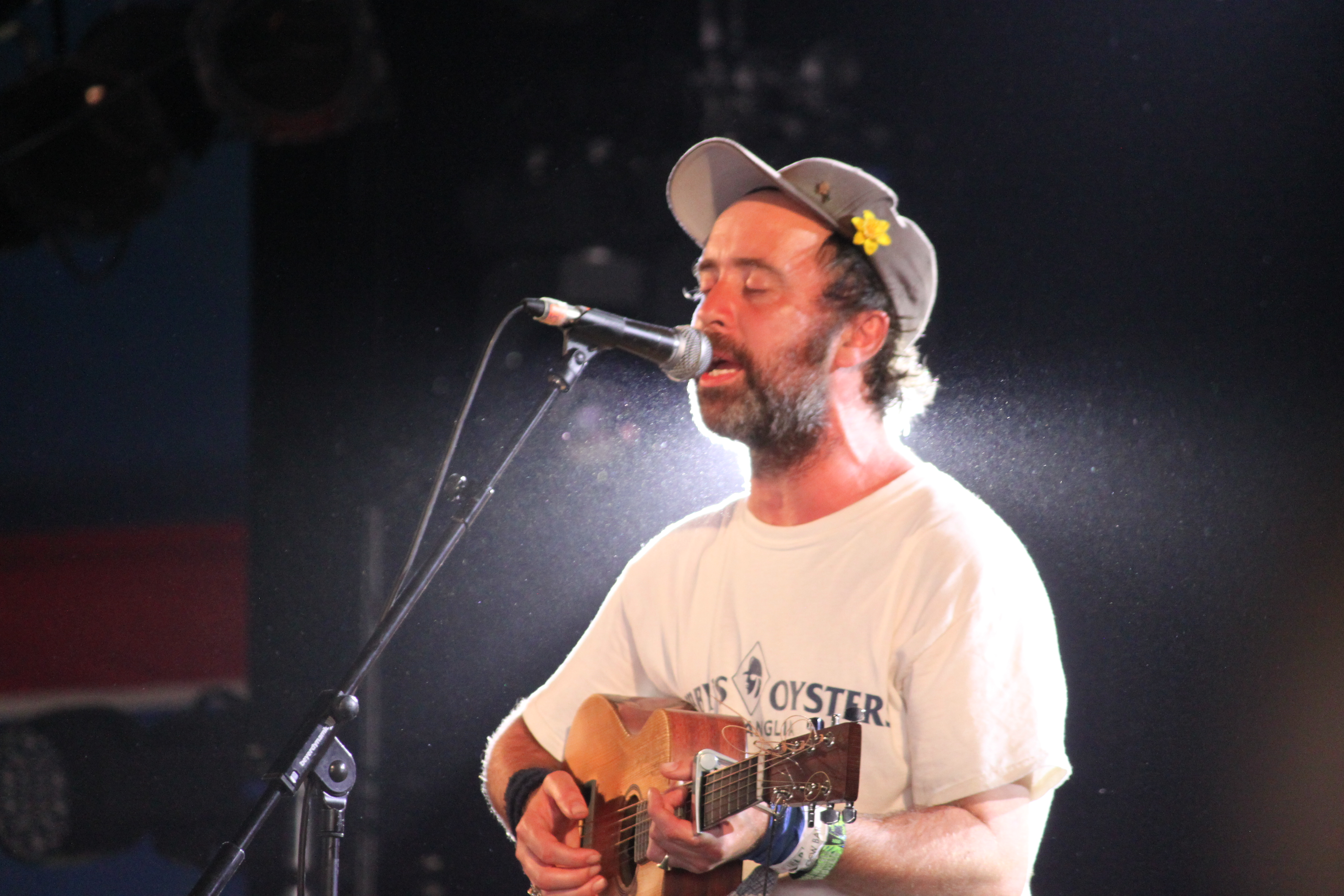
Appearing on the Avalon Stage at Glastonbury Festival 2019

2018's A Bird in the Hand was Beans' tenth studio album, produced by Ben Lovett in London's Church Studios. The album focuses heavily on the birth of his newborn daughter, tackling family, love and the world on your front doorstep.

On 31 July 2019, Beans announced his 11th studio album, The Inevitable Train Wreck, along with a US tour starting 5 November, and a UK tour starting 4 December. The first two singles from the album, "World Gone Crazy" and "England, I Love You", were released on 10 and 31 October respectively.

In 2020 Beans released two albums: The Unforeseeable Future, an album about the Covid Pandemic, written and recorded at home during that time, and Knee Deep in Nostalgia which was produced by Frank Turner. Both albums were released on McAllister's 40th birthday.

2021 Saw the release of his second book Foolhardy Folk Tales which starts with a fictional story set in Braintree in the 1990s and continues with many true tales from the songwriter's life. The book also introduced the world to 'Everyone's a Critic', a car game that Beans had made up to play with friends on the road. The book features the full rules of the game.

2021's album was called Survival of the Friendliest and was focused on the beauty of the human spirit, an optimistic album about joy and hope produced by old friend Blaine Harrison of the Mystery Jets. The album was followed by a huge UK tour and a Summer that saw him play over 30 festivals.

The Fascinating Adventures of Little Bee, a collaboration project with Jaime & Lily Adamsfield, was released in 2022. It was a collection of 10 children's stories and songs in a box set. Beautifully illustrated by Lily, these ten adventures see Little Bee learn important lessons about the world.

Beans On Toast continues to tour constantly and releases a new album each year on his birthday, 1 December.

== Discography ==
=== Studio albums ===
- Standing on a Chair (1 December 2009)
- Writing on the Wall (1 December 2010)
- Trying to Tell The Truth (1 December 2011)
- Fishing for a Thank You (1 December 2012)
- Giving Everything (1 December 2013)
- The Grand Scheme of Things (1 December 2014)
- Rolling Up the Hill (1 December 2015)
- A Spanner in the Works (1 December 2016)
- Cushty (1 December 2017)
- A Bird in the Hand (1 December 2018)
- The Inevitable Train Wreck (1 December 2019)
- Knee Deep in Nostalgia (1 December 2020)
- The Unforeseeable Future (1 December 2020)
- Survival of the Friendliest (1 December 2021)
- The Fascinating Adventures of Little Bee (1 December 2022)
- The Toothpaste and the Tube (1 December 2023)
- Wild Goose Chasers (1 December 2024)
- Kill Them with Kindness (1 December 2025)

The Great Unravelling ( 1 December 2026)

=== Compilations ===
- Rock Against Malaria (2009) Eunuch Records
- Live at Scala (25 September 2013)
- Best of Toast Pressed on Vinyl (19 April 2014)

=== One off collaborations ===
- This Christmas (December 2015) with Skinny Lister
