= The Workhorse Movement =

American alternative metal band (1994–2000)

- The Workhorse Movement in 2000

Background information
- Origin: Mount Pleasant, Michigan, U.S.
- Genres: Alternative metal; rap metal; funk rock; stoner rock
- Years active: 1994–2000
- Labels: Master Cylinder; Overcore; Roadrunner
- Spinoffs: Dirty Americans
- Past members: Myron; Freedom; Jay Vondoloski; Joe Mackie; Grady; Cornbread; Pete Bever

The Workhorse Movement (originally Workhorse) was an American alternative metal band from Mount Pleasant, Michigan.

== History ==
Workhorse was formed in August 1994 by singer Myron (Matt Kozuch-Rea), guitarist Freedom (Jeff Piper), bassist Jay Vondoloski, and drummer Joe Mackie, who were all attending Central Michigan University (CMU). The band took its name from a section in Tom Wolfe's The Electric Kool-Aid Acid Test (1968). After performing several local shows, the band released their self-financed debut album, Dopamine, in 1995. They relocated to Detroit, Michigan soon after at the urging of Joe Mackie, so they could pursue the band seriously and after touring with the likes of Sevendust, Skinlab and Vanilla Ice, recruited a second vocalist, Cornbread (Chris Sparks), and signed with the local Detroit label Overcore Records. The label re-issued the Dopamine album (still under the Workhorse name) with two live bonus tracks in 1997, and then following the name change to The Workhorse Movement, released the band's only EP, Rhythm and Soul Cartel, in 1998.

Following additional touring for the EP, the Workhorse Movement came to the attention of Roadrunner Records. After signing to the label, the band replaced the recently departed Jay Vondoloski (who had moved back to CMU) with Grady (Jeff Wright). The band's Roadrunner debut album, Sons of the Pioneers (2000), was recorded and produced by Overcore Records owner Scott Santos. It was finished by October 1999. Before the release of the album, the Workhorse Movement were featured on British music magazine Kerrang!'s "Hot 100" list for 2000. Leading up to the album's release, the band toured the United States with Kittie, Sevendust and Fishbone. Although the album garnered little attention in the United States, Sons of the Pioneers was well received by the British music press, appearing on the best-of year lists for Kerrang!, Metal Hammer and Rock Sound with lead single 'Keep The Sabbath Dream Alive' cracking the UK top 200 singles chart at number 196. The band gained further attention in the United Kingdom while touring as a supporting act for Pitchshifter.

In late December 2000, Myron announced that The Workhorse Movement had disbanded, citing a lack of promotional and touring support from Roadrunner in the United States and their lack of enthusiasm for a third album. The band performed their last show on December 23, 2000, at the Harpos Concert Theatre in Detroit. Myron, Freedom and Pete soon joined up with drummer Jeremiah Pillbeam to form the Dirty Americans in April 2001.

== Musical style and influences ==
The Workhorse Movement have been described as alternative metal, rap metal, funk rock, nu metal and stoner rock. Kerrang! described the band's sound as "stoner rap". The band was heavily influenced by the works of The Doors, Santana and Black Sabbath.

== Band members ==
Final lineup

- Matthew "M.C. Myron" Kozuch-Rea – vocals (1994–2000)
- Chris "Cornbread" Sparks – vocals (1995–2000)
- Jeff "Freedom" Piper – guitar (1994–2000)
- Patrick "Pete" Bever – bass (1999–2000)
- Joe Mackie – drums (1994–2000)

Former members

- Jay Vondoloski – bass (1994–1997)
- Jeff "Grady" Wright – bass (1997–1999)

Timeline

== Discography ==
Studio Albums

Title	Album details
Dopamine	Released: 1995; Label: Master Cylinder; Format: CD
Sons of the Pioneers	Released: June 6, 2000; Label: Roadrunner; Format: CD

EPs

- Rhythm and Soul Cartel (1998)

Singles

- "Keep the Sabbath Dream Alive" (2000) (UK Singles Chart: #196)
