= Andy Hawkins (music producer) =

British musician and record producer

- Born: 15 June 1977 (age 47)
- Origin: Leeds, UK
- Occupation(s): Musician, music producer, recording engineer, mixing engineer
- Instrument: Bass guitar
- Years active: 1996-present
- Labels: Radar Records; Sire Records; Wrath Records; Fierce Panda
- Website: https://www.andyhawkinsproducer.co.uk

Andy Hawkins (born 15 June 1977) is a British musician and record producer, based in Leeds in the UK.

He was the bassist in the pop punk band Midget (1996–2001), and now works in Leeds as a producer and live sound engineer, based at The Nave Studios.

He has worked with artists such as The Damned, The Twang, Maxïmo Park, Blood Red Shoes, Eureka Machines, Chris Catalyst, Black Moth, Austin Gold, Hyena Kill, Grave Lines, Sugarhorse, Sounds of Swami, The Human Project, Burning Codes, Janus Stark, Eat Defeat, The Candle Thieves, Random Hand, Hawk Eyes, Agnostic Front, The Dickies, Flogging Molly, Sugarcult, Motion City Soundtrack, Matchbook Romance, The Pigeon Detectives, Ginger of The Wildhearts, No Nothings, The Hubbards, Jellicoe, Nick Corney & The Buzz Rats.
