= Desperate Journalist =

English post-punk band

- Desperate Journalist 2026

Background information
- Origin: London, England
- Genres: Post-punk revival, indie rock
- Years active: 2012–present
- Label: Fierce Panda
- Members: Jo Bevan; Simon Drowner; Rob Hardy; Caroline "Caz" Helbert
- Website: desperatejournalist.co.uk

Desperate Journalist are an English, London-based post-punk band, formed in 2012. They released their self-titled debut album in 2015 on Fierce Panda Records. A second album, Grow Up, was released in March 2017. The band's third album, In Search of the Miraculous, was released in February 2019. A fourth album, Maximum Sorrow!, was released on 2 July 2021. Their fifth album, No Hero, was released on 27 September 2024. Their sixth album Gilding The Lily was released on 20 November 2026.

== Biography ==
The band was formed in North London in 2012, by Jo Bevan (vocals), Rob Hardy (guitar), Simon Drowner (bass) and Caroline Helbert (drums). Hardy and Drowner had previously played together in Birmingham-based band The Drowners; Drowner had then later played bass in Bevan's previous band If.... Helbert joined the band as drummer, having "never really played before". They wrote their first song, "Kitten", at their first rehearsal. The band's name derives from The Cure rarity, "Desperate Journalist in Ongoing Meaningful Review Situation".

The band played their first gig in February 2013 at the Silver Bullet in Finsbury Park. After self-releasing debut EP Cristina they were quickly signed by Fierce Panda, who released "Organ" and "Happening" as singles, leading to their debut album, Desperate Journalist, in November 2014, which was recorded at Dean Street Studios with Keith TOTP.

The Quietus, reviewing their debut album, described them as "beautiful and spellbinding"; Drowned in Sound said that they had "effortless grace" and praised Bevan's vocals. The band toured the United Kingdom to support the release of the album, including an appearance at Whitby Gothic Weekend.

In 2015 the band played indietracks, headlined the 100 Club, and released a new EP, Good Luck. In 2016, they toured Europe in the spring, and supported Chameleons Vox on a UK tour in August, as well as recording a second album.

The second album, Grow Up, was released in March 2017, backed by a headline tour of the UK and Germany, including a date at the Scala. The first single, "Hollow", was released in October 2016, with an official music video following in November. It was reviewed well by Stereogum, and was picked out as Song of the Day by KEXP. The second single, "Resolution", about New Year's Eve parties, was released on 1 January 2017 and has been playlisted by BBC Radio 6 Music. A music video was released on 27 January. A third single, "Be Kind", was released in March 2017, two weeks before the album. It was playlisted by Virgin Radio UK. The fourth and final single, "Why Are You So Boring?", a 'protest song about tossers' was released in June 2017. The band toured throughout 2017 making summer festival appearances at Wave-Gotik-Treffen, Tramlines, and Benicàssim, and supporting the Slow Readers Club on tour in November.

The band released a new single, "It Gets Better" in January 2018, from forthcoming EP You Get Used to It, whose release coincided with a German tour in April 2018. In November 2018 the band released "Cedars", the first single of a third album, In Search of the Miraculous, for release in February 2019. From November 2018 they were joined by Charley Stone as a live guitarist. On 2 April 2021 Desperate Journalist released "Fear" and announced their fourth studio album, Maximum Sorrow!, which was released on 2 July 2021. In March and December 2023, Desperate Journalist supported Suede on their Autofiction UK Tour.On 10 June, Desperate Journalist released the single "Unsympathetic Parts 1&2" and announced their fifth album, No Hero, released on 27 September 2024. Stone did not feature in the subsequent tour. On 24 August, Desperate Journalist announced their sixth studio album Gilding the Lily with its accompanying single "Terrible Years" Set to be released on 20 November 2026

== Members ==
- Jo Bevan – vocals
- Simon Drowner – bass guitar
- Rob Hardy – guitar
- Caroline "Caz" Helbert – drums

Live members

- Charley Stone – guitar (2018–2024)

== Discography ==
=== Albums ===
- Desperate Journalist (January 2015)
- Grow Up (March 2017)
- In Search of the Miraculous (February 2019)
- Maximum Sorrow! (July 2021)
- Live at JT Soar (December 2022)
- No Hero (September 2024)
- Gilding the Lily (November 2026)

=== Singles and EPs ===
- Cristina EP [Cristina/Mistakes/Kitten/Wait] (June 2013)
- "Organ" [CDs b/w "Distance"] (November 2013)
- "Happening" [CDS b/w "Vengeance"] (May 2014)
- "Hesitate" [CDs b/w "Happening (Medium Wave remix)"/"The Fire"] (June 2015)
- Good Luck EP [Good Luck/Leave Home/A Phase/Paint Something/Perfect Health] (October 2015)
- "Hollow" [CDs b/w "Hollow (Medium Wave remix)"] (October 2016)
- "Resolution" [CDs b/w "Bruce"] (January 2017)
- "Be Kind" (March 2017)
- "Why Are You So Boring" [CDs b/w ""Be Kind" and "Your Genius" (Pop10.de acoustic sessions)] (June 2017)
- "It Gets Better" (January 2018)
- You Get Used To It EP [Incandescent/It Gets Better/Nothing Happens/About You/The Bomb] (April 2018)
- "Cedars" (November 2018)
- "Fault" (April 2021)
- "Personality Girlfriend" (May 2021)
- "Everything You Wanted" (June 2021)
- ”Unsympathetic Parts 1&2” (June 2024)
- ”Afraid” (July 2024)
- ”You Say Your Lonely” (September 2024)
- “Terrible Years” (August 2026)
- “20th Century Women” (September 2026)
- ”Dust” (October 2026)
