= Dirty Americans =

Musical act

- Origin: Detroit, Michigan, United States
- Genre: Rock
- Years active: 2001–2012
- Labels: Roadrunner; Liquor & Poker; Takes The Biscuit
- Spinoff of: The Workhorse Movement
- Members: Myron (Vocals); Freedom (Guitar); Pete (Bass); Jeremiah (Drums)
- Website: www.dirtyamericans.com

The Dirty Americans were a Detroit-based rock band that released two albums and three EPs.

== History ==
The band was formed by previous members of The Workhorse Movement, who had brief success in the UK and toured with Pitchshifter, as well as touring the US on the Tattoo the Earth tour with acts including Slayer. Myron (real name Matt Kozuch), Freedom (real name Jeff Piper) and Pete (real name Patrick) formed the Dirty Americans when the Workhorse Movement disbanded in December 2000, along with drummer Jeremiah Pilbeam of Dundee, Michigan.

The band produced a three-track demo for Roadrunner Records, their previous band's record label. One track, "Nuclear Bomb", aired on UK internet radio station Total Rock Radio on July 3, 2001.

The band recorded an album's worth of material in December 2001 with Paul Ebersold, but Roadrunner Records held up the release. An EP, ... Kiss 'Em All Goodbye, was finally released in the US in August 2003 containing three songs and two demos from the recording session. An album, Strange Generation, was released in Europe, Japan and Australia in March 2004, followed by tours of Japan and Europe. It received a rating score of four out of ten from PopMatters. The band was released from their contract with Roadrunner Records, and the debut album was later released in the US by Liquor & Poker Music.

As well as US and UK tours, the Dirty Americans have appeared at music festivals including Download Festival, Festimad Festival, the Iggy And The Stooges Reunion, the Summer Sonic Festival, Rock Am Ring and Rock Im Park, the Detroit Harley festival, and the Alice Cooper tour.

Their song "Car Crash" is featured on the soundtrack for the PlayStation 2 video game Gran Turismo 4. Their song "Burn You Down" is featured in the main menus to the 2004 PlayStation 2 racing game ATV Offroad Fury 3, and 2004 PlayStation 2 hockey game Gretzky NHL 2005.

== Discography ==
Year of release	Title	Label
2003	...Kiss 'em All Goodbye [EP]	Roadrunner Records (US Only)
2004	Strange Generation	Roadrunner Records (Europe, Japan, Australia); Liquor & Poker Music (US)
2007	Jet Black Holy Water [EP]	(US only) (US)
2008	Detroit S.O.B. [EP]	(US only) (US)
2011	Black Feather [iTunes]	
