= Midget (band) =

British pop-rock band

- Origin: Stamford, Lincolnshire, England,
- Genres: Pop punk
- Years active: 1995–2001, 2006–present
- Labels: Radar, Pet Sounds
- Members: Richard Gombault; Andy Hawkins; Lee Major
- Website: insall.co.uk/midget

Midget are an English pop-rock band from Stamford, Lincolnshire, England, who formed in 1996. The trio released the mini-album Alco-Pop and the albums Jukebox, Individual Inconsistent and The Milgram Experiment. Two of their singles made the UK Singles Chart in 1998 ("All Fall Down" reached No. 57 and "Invisible Balloon" No. 66). They disbanded in 2001, but have reunited to play occasional UK gigs in 2006, 2013, and 2025.

In September 2025, Midget released the song "She's My Heroine", their first new material in over 20 years.

== Discography ==
Studio albums

- Alco-Pop (1997)
- Jukebox (1998)
- Individual Inconsistent (1999)
- The Milgram Experiment (2001)
