= Red Flag 77 =

- Origin: Ipswich, England
- Genres: Punk rock
- Years active: 1990–present
- Members: Rikki Flag - Vocals; Kev Moore - Guitar; John 'Fanny' Adams - Bass; Malculm Powder - Drums
- Past members: Glenn McCarthy - Bass; Roki - Guitar

Red Flag 77 are an English punk rock band from Ipswich, England, that formed in 1990. The band recorded their first album, Punk not Dread, after playing just three gigs. Since then, they have released many 7" singles and three albums - A Shortcut To a Better World (Beer City Records) Stop The World and Rotten Inside (Captain Oi! Records). They are influenced by 1970s punk bands such as Sex Pistols, Ramones, The Clash and The Rezillos.
