= Fierce Panda Records =

British independent record label

- Founded: 1994; 32 years ago
- Founder: John Harris, Paul Moody, Simon Williams
- Distributors: Essential Music & Marketing
- Country of origin: United Kingdom
- Location: London
- Official website: fiercepanda.co.uk

Fierce Panda Records is a London-based independent record label, with its first release in February 1994. It also produced a small number of releases that year by now famous artists such as Ash, The Bluetones, Baby Bird and Supergrass. Fierce Panda is also credited with releases by Acres of Lions, Air Traffic, Art Brut, The Blackout, Boy Kill Boy, Coldplay, Death Cab for Cutie, Desperate Journalist, Embrace, Goldheart Assembly, Hundred Reasons, Kenickie, Seafood, Keane, Placebo, The Polyphonic Spree and Shitdisco.

== History ==
Fierce Panda was founded in April 1994 by NME journalists Simon Williams, John Harris, and Paul Moody. It was founded with the intent of releasing the EP Shagging in the Streets which would compile the best of the short-lived new wave of new wave scene. They initially intended to release only that EP and cease the label's activity.

In the autumn of 1997, Fierce Panda formed the sub-label Rabid Badger Records to release more dance oriented music, and in spring 1998 the sub-label Livid Meerkat for post-rock music.

Fierce Panda also had released compilation albums and EPs, whose titles are mainly puns, often in-jokes. In 2006 they announced their decision to cease production of one-off singles, concentrating instead on long-term projects and full-length albums. Dead Disco's 2006 single "Automatic" was announced as the final single. Continuing to release albums however, including "Vivian, Don't" by The Spinto Band, and the debut album from Hatcham Social among many others. On 21 March 2011, the label released the debut album, Chasing After Ghosts, by The Crookes.

Their "Wibbling Rivalry" single, an interview with Oasis' Liam and Noel Gallagher, holds the record for the highest-charting interview single in the UK Singles Chart, reaching number 52 in November 1995.

Fierce Panda's highest-charting single was "Emily Kane" by Art Brut, which reached number 41 in May 2005, missing out on the Top 40 by a mere two sales.

2008 saw Fierce Panda set up its management stable which currently includes Albert Gold, Hatcham Social, Longfellow and Felt Tip.

In 2012 Fierce Panda also set up a publishing arm, named Fierce Panda Songs.

== See also ==
- List of record labels
- List of independent UK record labels
- List of Fierce Panda Records compilation albums
- List of bands signed to Fierce Panda Records
