= Pearl Mystic =

Studio album by Hookworms
- Released: 4 March 2013
- Recorded: Suburban Home Studios (Leeds)
- Genres: Noise rock; psychedelic rock
- Length: 44:19
- Labels: Gringo Records, Weird World
- Producer: MJ (Hookworms)

Hookworms chronology
Hookworms (2011)	Pearl Mystic (2013)	The Hum (2014)

Professional ratings
Aggregate scores
Source	Rating
Metacritic	77/100
Review scores
Source	Rating
Drowned in Sound	10/10
The Line of Best Fit	8/10
MusicOMH	4.5/5 stars

Pearl Mystic is the first studio album and second long play record by British rock band Hookworms, released on 4 March 2013 on Gringo Records (UK), and later Weird World (Rest of World), an imprint of Domino. The album's namesake is pearl mystic turquoise, also the colour of the sleeve artwork.

== Critical reception ==
The album received positive reviews on release, and was later named in end of year critics lists. It was named Loud and Quiet, BrooklynVegan, and Drowned in Sound's number one album of 2013. The Skinny, Jim Fusilli of The Wall Street Journal, and several major UK record stores (Norman Records, Music Exchange, Rise, Piccadilly Records, Sister Ray Records, Resident Records, and Drift Records) placed Pearl Mystic in their top ten releases of 2013, with the record also appearing in Time Out, NME, and The Guardian's top-rated records of that year.

== Track listing ==
All tracks are written by Hookworms.

No.	Title	Length
1.	"Away/Towards"	8:49
2.	"Form & Function"	5:58
3.	"I"	2:44
4.	"In Our Time"	4:50
5.	"Since We Have Changed"	7:32
6.	"Preservation"	5:04
7.	"II"	1:30
8.	"What We Talk About"	4:01
9.	"III"	3:51
Total length:		44:19

== Personnel ==
Hookworms

- EG – Drums, percussion
- JW – Guitars, sleeves and design
- MB – Bass, synths
- MJ – Vocals, backing vocals, keyboards, synths, producing, recording, mixing
- SS – Guitars

Additional

- Published by Domino Publishing Co. Ltd
- Recorded by MJ at Suburban Home Studios, Leeds
- Mixed by MJ at Suburban Home Studios, Leeds
- Mastered by Carl Saff at Saff Mastering
- Sleeves, design by JW (Idiot's Pasture)
