= 1001 Albums You Must Hear Before You Die =

2005 Robert Dimery book

- Original edition cover
- Author: Robert Dimery (general editor)
- Cover artist: Jon Wainright
- Language: English
- Genre: Reference work
- Publisher: Tristan de Lancey; Universe Publishing (first edition)
- Publication date: 2005
- Publication place: United Kingdom
- Media type: Print (Hardback)
- Pages: 960 p.
- ISBN: 1-84403-392-9
- OCLC: 224890343
- Dewey Decimal: 781.64026/6 22
- LC Class: ML156.9 .A18 2006

1001 Albums You Must Hear Before You Die is a musical reference book first published in 2005 (with several later editions) by Universe Publishing. Part of the 1001 Before You Die series, it compiles writings and information on albums chosen by a panel of music critics to be the most important, influential, and best in popular music between the 1950s and the date of publication. The book is edited by Robert Dimery, an English writer and editor who had previously worked for magazines such as Time Out and Vogue.

Each entry in the book's roughly chronological list of albums is accompanied by a short essay written by a music critic, along with pictures, quotes, and additional information (such as the album's running time and producer). Compilations of various artists, and most film soundtracks, are excluded.

== Selection and sorting methodology ==
In the book's introduction, general editor Robert Dimery notes that the selections were also intended to bring attention to gifted songwriters. Joni Mitchell, Elvis Costello and Nick Cave are named as examples. The release dates are chosen from the date the album first released in the artist's home country, and the version is the first one released. In most cases, bonus tracks added for later versions are ignored. The editors also attempted to ensure that each album profiled was still available for purchase. Soundtracks that were not original material from a particular artist were also excluded.

== Editions ==
The 2005 edition starts with Frank Sinatra's In the Wee Small Hours, and ends with Get Behind Me Satan by the White Stripes. As the book has been reissued several times, some albums are removed in each edition to make space for more recent albums.

The 2010 edition ends with It's Blitz! by Yeah Yeah Yeahs, while the 2013 edition ends with The Next Day by David Bowie. The 2016 edition ends with Blackstar, also by Bowie. The 2018 edition ends with Microshift by Hookworms. The 2021 edition ends with Heaux Tales by Jazmine Sullivan. The 2026 edition ends with Wuthering Heights by Charli XCX.

== Critical reception ==
Writing for The Sun-Herald in November 2005, John Clare said that he loved the book and that it "is good-looking and has a great body" which is "perfectly proportioned", being "fat but not too wide or tall". Of the jazz albums included in the book, Clare felt that "all are well chosen except one"; he thought that the inclusion of two Stan Getz albums was too many given the absence of a Louis Armstrong album. In a more critical review in the same month, Matt Price of The Australian said that "[t]he whole premise of the book is humbug", arguing that it would take too long to listen through all the albums in the book whilst also following new releases. He also criticized several of the book's choices on what albums to include and to not include, concluding that it was "biased, un-Australian and unacceptable".

In February 2006, Publishers Weekly called the book a "bookshelf-busting testament to music geeks' mania for lists" and said it was "about as comprehensive a 'best-of' as any sane person could want ... For music lovers, it doesn't get much better." Mirela Roncevic reviewed the book for Library Journal in May of that year, citing it as an example of a reference work that is "highly enjoyable to browse" and "downright addictive". Grant Alden also reviewed the book in May 2006 for No Depression. He stated that he was unaware of most of the critics who contributed to the book and was of the opinion that "you don't have to hear all these". He also criticized the relative lack of albums included in the book from the 1950s compared to later decades.

== Genres ==
Most of the book's recommendations are rock and pop albums from the Anglosphere. 1001 Albums also features selections from world music, rhythm and blues, blues, folk, hip hop, country, electronic music, and jazz. The rock and pop albums include such subgenres as punk rock, grindcore, heavy metal, alternative rock, progressive rock, easy listening, thrash metal, grunge and rockabilly. Classical and modern art music are excluded.

== Artists ==
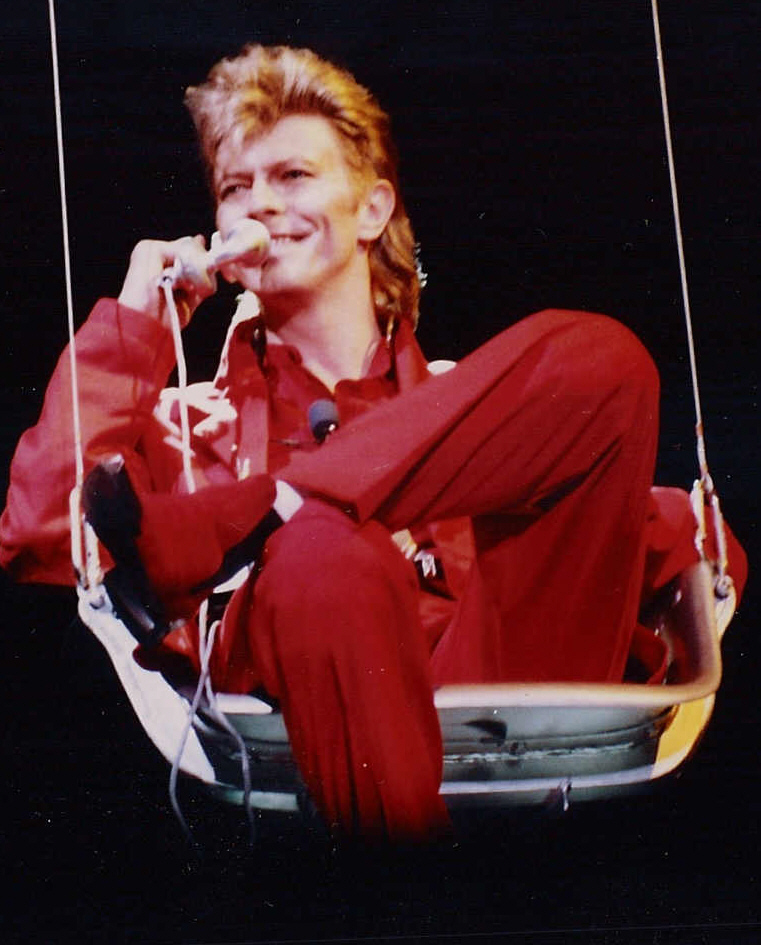
David Bowie (pictured in 1987) is the musician with most albums on the list at 9.

These artists have the most albums in the 2017 edition.

- 9 albums: David Bowie, (Note: He was also involved with producing and recording 2 Iggy Pop albums, and 1 Lou Reed album listed in the book.) John Lennon (2 solo albums and 7 Beatles albums), Paul McCartney (1 solo album, 1 Wings album and 7 Beatles albums), Neil Young (7 solo albums, 1 Buffalo Springfield album and 1 Crosby, Stills, Nash & Young album).
- 8 albums: George Harrison (1 solo album and 7 Beatles albums).
- 7 albums: the Beatles, Bob Dylan, Brian Eno (4 solo albums, 2 Roxy Music albums and 1 collaborative album with David Byrne), (Note: He was also involved with producing 7 albums listed in the book: 3 Talking Heads albums, 3 U2 albums and 1 Devo album.) Morrissey (4 solo albums and 3 Smiths albums), David Crosby (4 Byrds albums, 1 solo album, 1 Crosby, Stills & Nash album and 1 Crosby, Stills, Nash & Young album).
- 6 albums: Nick Cave (1 Birthday Party album and 5 Nick Cave and the Bad Seeds albums), Elvis Costello (3 solo albums and 3 Attractions albums), (Note: He was also involved with producing 2 albums listed in the book: The Specials' debut album and Rum Sodomy & the Lash by The Pogues.) the Rolling Stones, Paul Simon (3 solo albums and 3 Simon and Garfunkel albums).
- 5 albums: the Byrds, Gene Clark (2 solo albums and 3 Byrds albums), Donald Fagen (1 solo album and 4 Steely Dan albums), Peter Gabriel (3 solo albums and 2 Genesis albums), Iggy Pop (2 solo albums and 3 Stooges albums), Led Zeppelin, Lou Reed (2 solo albums and 3 Velvet Underground albums), Sonic Youth, Bruce Springsteen, Stephen Stills (2 solo albums, 1 Buffalo Springfield album, 1 Crosby, Stills & Nash album and 1 Crosby, Stills, Nash & Young album), Tom Waits, the Who, David Byrne (4 Talking Heads albums and 1 collaborative album with Brian Eno).
- 4 albums: Black Francis (1 solo album and 3 Pixies albums), Blixa Bargeld (1 album with Einstürzende Neubauten and 3 albums with Nick Cave and the Bad Seeds), Leonard Cohen, Eric Clapton (1 solo album, 1 Cream album, 1 Derek and the Dominos album and 1 album with John Mayall & the Bluesbreakers), Miles Davis, Dave Grohl (1 album with Foo Fighters and 3 albums with Nirvana), P.J. Harvey, the Kinks, Metallica, Joni Mitchell, Pink Floyd, Radiohead, R.E.M., Steely Dan, Rod Stewart (2 solo albums, 1 Faces album and 1 album with Jeff Beck), Talking Heads, (Note: In addition to David Byrne, Chris Franz and Tina Weymouth participated in the recording of the debut album Tom Tom Club, and Jerry Harrison participated in the recording of The Modern Lovers album, who are also listed in the book.) U2, Paul Weller (1 solo album, 2 Jam albums and 1 Style Council album), Björk (3 solo albums and 1 Sugarcubes album), Brian Wilson (1 solo album and 3 Beach Boys albums), Dennis Wilson (1 solo album and 3 Beach Boys albums), Stevie Wonder.
- 3 albums: Aerosmith, Barry Adamson (2 solo albums and 1 Magazine album), the Beach Boys, Beastie Boys, Black Sabbath, Blur, (Note: Blur singer Damon Albarn also appeared on two albums that were previously featured in the book: Gorillaz’s debut album and The Good, the Bad & the Queen’s debut album.) Tim Buckley, Kate Bush, John Cale (2 Velvet Underground albums and 1 solo album), Johnny Cash, Creedence Clearwater Revival, the Cure, Deep Purple, Dexys Midnight Runners, the Doors, Nick Drake, Echo & the Bunnymen, the Fall, Madonna, Marvin Gaye, Emmylou Harris (2 solo albums and 1 collaborative album with Dolly Parton and Linda Ronstadt), Ice Cube (2 solo albums and 1 N.W.A album), the Jimi Hendrix Experience, Michael Jackson, Lemmy Kilmister (2 albums with Motörhead and 1 album with Hawkwind), Kraftwerk, John Lydon (1 album with the Sex Pistols and 2 albums with Public Image Ltd.), Bob Marley and the Wailers, Van Morrison, My Bloody Valentine, Nirvana, Parliament/Funkadelic, Pet Shop Boys, Jason Pierce (2 albums with Spiritualized and 1 album with Spacemen 3), Pixies, Elvis Presley, Prince (2 solo albums and 1 the Revolution album), Public Enemy, Q-Tip (2 A Tribe Called Quest albums and 1 solo album), Queen, Roxy Music, Frank Sinatra, the Velvet Underground, Kanye West, Wilco, Steve Winwood (1 solo album and 2 Traffic albums), (Note: He also participated in recordings on 5 albums listed in the book: Electric Ladyland by The Jimi Hendrix Experience, Berlin by Lou Reed, One World by John Martyn, Broken English by Marianne Faithfull and The Colour of Spring by Talk Talk.) Jah Wobble (2 albums with Public Image Ltd. and 1 with Jah Wobble’s Invaders of the Heart), Robert Wyatt (2 solo albums and 1 Soft Machine album), Yes, Frank Zappa (1 solo album and 2 Mothers of Invention albums).

== Full List ==
The various editions of the book include additions and removals; all entries are listed here, resulting in a total greater than 1001. The second column - labelled "1001 Number" — indicates the album's position within the 1001 list (as of the 1990s editions) and notes whether it has been removed (indicated by a "-").

=== 1950s ===
	Artist(s)	Title	Year
1	Frank Sinatra	In the Wee Small Hours	1955
2	Elvis Presley	Elvis Presley	1956
3	The Louvin Brothers	Tragic Songs of Life	1956
4	Louis Prima	The Wildest!	1956
5	Fats Domino	This Is Fats	1956
6	Duke Ellington	Ellington at Newport	1956
7	Frank Sinatra	Songs for Swingin' Lovers!	1956
8	The Crickets	The "Chirping" Crickets	1957
9	Count Basie	The Atomic Mr. Basie	1957
10	Thelonious Monk	Brilliant Corners	1957
11	Sabu Martinez	Palo Congo	1957
12	Miles Davis	Birth of the Cool	1957
13	Little Richard	Here's Little Richard	1957
14	Machito	Kenya	1958
15	Tito Puente & His Orchestra	Dance Mania	1958
16	Billie Holiday	Lady in Satin	1958
17	Ramblin' Jack Elliott	Jack Takes the Floor	1958
18	Sarah Vaughan	At Mister Kelly's	1958
19	Ella Fitzgerald	Ella Fitzgerald Sings the George and Ira Gershwin Songbook	1959
20	Ray Charles	The Genius of Ray Charles	1959
21	Miles Davis	Kind of Blue	1959
22	Marty Robbins	Gunfighter Ballads and Trail Songs	1959
23	Dave Brubeck	Time Out	1959

=== 1960s ===
	Artist(s)	Title	Year
24	Joan Baez	Joan Baez	1960
25	Elvis Presley	Elvis Is Back!	1960
26	Miriam Makeba	Miriam Makeba	1960
27	The Everly Brothers	A Date with the Everly Brothers	1960
28	Jimmy Smith	Back at the Chicken Shack	1960
29	Muddy Waters	At Newport 1960	1960
30	Bill Evans	Sunday at the Village Vanguard	1961
31	Ray Charles	Modern Sounds in Country and Western Music	1962
32	Booker T. & the M.G.'s	Green Onions	1962
33	Stan Getz & Charlie Byrd	Jazz Samba	1962
34	Ray Price	Night Life	1963
35	The Beatles	With the Beatles	1963
36	Bob Dylan	The Freewheelin' Bob Dylan	1963
37	Phil Spector & Various Artists	A Christmas Gift for You from Phil Spector	1963
38	Sam Cooke	Live at the Harlem Square Club, 1963	1963
39	Charles Mingus	The Black Saint and the Sinner Lady	1963
40	James Brown	Live at the Apollo	1963
41	Stan Getz & João Gilberto	Getz/Gilberto	1964
42	The Beatles	A Hard Day’s Night	1964
43	Jacques Brel	Olympia 64	1964
44	Solomon Burke	Rock 'n' Soul	1964
45	Dusty Springfield	A Girl Called Dusty	1964
46	The Rolling Stones	The Rolling Stones	1964
47	Buck Owens	I've Got a Tiger By the Tail	1965
48	Jerry Lee Lewis	Live at the Star Club, Hamburg	1965
49	The Sonics	Here Are the Sonics	1965
50	Bob Dylan	Bringing It All Back Home	1965
51	Otis Redding	Otis Blue: Otis Redding Sings Soul	1965
52	The Beach Boys	The Beach Boys Today!	1965
53	John Coltrane	A Love Supreme	1965
54	B. B. King	Live at the Regal	1965
55	The Beatles	Rubber Soul	1965
56	Bert Jansch	Bert Jansch	1965
57	The Byrds	Mr. Tambourine Man	1965
58	Bob Dylan	Highway 61 Revisited	1965
59	The Who	My Generation	1965
60	The Beatles	Revolver	1966
61	The Beach Boys	Pet Sounds	1966
62	Fred Neil	Fred Neil	1966
63	The Byrds	Fifth Dimension	1966
64	Bob Dylan	Blonde on Blonde	1966
65	The Monks	Black Monk Time	1966
66	The Kinks	Face to Face	1966
67	The Mamas and the Papas	If You Can Believe Your Eyes and Ears	1966
68	Paul Revere and the Raiders	Midnight Ride	1966
69	The Mothers of Invention	Freak Out!	1966
70	The Rolling Stones	Aftermath	1966
71	Simon & Garfunkel	Parsley, Sage, Rosemary and Thyme	1966
72	13th Floor Elevators	The Psychedelic Sounds of the 13th Floor Elevators	1966
73	John Mayall	Blues Breakers with Eric Clapton	1966
74	The Yardbirds	The Yardbirds	1966
75	Nina Simone	Wild Is the Wind	1966
76	Astrud Gilberto	Beach Samba	1967
77	Nico	Chelsea Girl	1967
78	The Beatles	Sgt. Pepper's Lonely Hearts Club Band	1967
79	Country Joe & the Fish	Electric Music for the Mind and Body	1967
80	Buffalo Springfield	Buffalo Springfield Again	1967
81	Captain Beefheart & His Magic Band	Safe as Milk	1967
82	Moby Grape	Moby Grape	1967
83	Love	Da Capo	1967
84	The Beau Brummels	Triangle	1967
85	The Monkees	Headquarters	1967
86	Tim Buckley	Goodbye and Hello	1967
87	Love	Forever Changes	1967
88	Cream	Disraeli Gears	1967
89	Pink Floyd	The Piper at the Gates of Dawn	1967
90	The Who	The Who Sell Out	1967
91	The Velvet Underground	The Velvet Underground and Nico	1967
92	Frank Sinatra	Francis Albert Sinatra & Antonio Carlos Jobim	1967
93	The Doors	The Doors	1967
94	The Byrds	Younger Than Yesterday	1967
95	Young Rascals	Groovin'	1967
96	Jefferson Airplane	Surrealistic Pillow	1967
97	The Kinks	Something Else by the Kinks	1967
98	Donovan	Sunshine Superman	1967
99	Merle Haggard	I'm a Lonesome Fugitive	1967
100	The Jimi Hendrix Experience	Are You Experienced	1967
101	The Electric Prunes	I Had Too Much to Dream (Last Night)	1967
102	Loretta Lynn	Don't Come Home a Drinkin' (With Lovin' on Your Mind)	1967
103	The Jimi Hendrix Experience	Axis: Bold as Love	1967
104	Aretha Franklin	I Never Loved a Man the Way I Love You	1967
105	The Rolling Stones	Beggars Banquet	1968
106	Shivkumar Sharma / Brij Bhushan Kabra / Hariprasad Chaurasia	Call of the Valley	1968
107	The Velvet Underground	White Light/White Heat	1968
108	Traffic	Traffic	1968
109	The Incredible String Band	The Hangman's Beautiful Daughter	1968
110	The Kinks	The Kinks Are the Village Green Preservation Society	1968
111	Ravi Shankar	The Sounds of India	1968
112	Os Mutantes	Os Mutantes	1968
113	The Jimi Hendrix Experience	Electric Ladyland	1968
114	Leonard Cohen	Songs of Leonard Cohen	1968
115	Johnny Cash	At Folsom Prison	1968
116	Laura Nyro	Eli and the Thirteenth Confession	1968
117	Aretha Franklin	Lady Soul	1968
118	Blue Cheer	Vincebus Eruptum	1968
119	The Byrds	The Notorious Byrd Brothers	1968
120	Big Brother and the Holding Company	Cheap Thrills	1968
121	The United States of America	The United States of America	1968
122	Dr. John	Gris-Gris	1968
123	Iron Butterfly	In a Gadda da Vida	1968
124	The Pretty Things	S.F. Sorrow	1968
125	Simon & Garfunkel	Bookends	1968
126	Small Faces	Ogdens' Nut Gone Flake	1968
127	The Band	Music from Big Pink	1968
128	Jeff Beck	Truth	1968
129	Caetano Veloso	Caetano Veloso	1968
130	Scott Walker	Scott 2	1968
131	The Zombies	Odessey and Oracle	1968
132	Van Morrison	Astral Weeks	1968
133	The Byrds	Sweetheart of the Rodeo	1968
134	The Beatles	The Beatles (« The white Album »)	1968
135	The Mothers of Invention	We're Only in It for the Money	1968
136	Neil Young	Everybody Knows This Is Nowhere	1969
137	Captain Beefheart & His Magic Band	Trout Mask Replica	1969
138	Creedence Clearwater Revival	Bayou Country	1969
139	Crosby, Stills & Nash	Crosby, Stills & Nash	1969
140	Blood, Sweat and Tears	Blood, Sweat and Tears	1969
141	The Flying Burrito Brothers	The Gilded Palace of Sin	1969
142	Johnny Cash	At San Quentin	1969
143	Creedence Clearwater Revival	Green River	1969
144	The Beatles	Abbey Road	1969
145	The Who	Tommy	1969
146	Miles Davis	In a Silent Way	1969
147	Bee Gees	Odessa	1969
148	Pentangle	Basket of Light	1969
149	The Rolling Stones	Let It Bleed	1969
150	Nick Drake	Five Leaves Left	1969
151	Dusty Springfield	Dusty in Memphis	1969
152	Elvis Presley	From Elvis in Memphis	1969
153	The Velvet Underground	The Velvet Underground	1969
154	Quicksilver Messenger Service	Happy Trails	1969
155	Led Zeppelin	Led Zeppelin	1969
156	The Band	The Band	1969
157	Led Zeppelin	Led Zeppelin II	1969
158	MC5	Kick Out the Jams	1969
159	The Temptations	Cloud Nine	1969
160	Sly & the Family Stone	Stand!	1969
161	Tim Buckley	Happy Sad	1969
162	Chicago	The Chicago Transit Authority	1969
163	Fairport Convention	Unhalfbricking	1969
164	The Youngbloods	Elephant Mountain	1969
165	Isaac Hayes	Hot Buttered Soul	1969
166	Grateful Dead	Live/Dead	1969
167	The Kinks	Arthur (Or the Decline and Fall of the British Empire)	1969
168	King Crimson	In the Court of the Crimson King	1969
169	Leonard Cohen	Songs from a Room	1969
170	Fairport Convention	Liege & Lief	1969
171	Scott Walker	Scott 4	1969
172	The Stooges	The Stooges	1969
173	Skip Spence	Oar	1969
174	Frank Zappa	Hot Rats	1969

=== 1970s ===
	Artist(s)	Title	Year
175	Creedence Clearwater Revival	Cosmo's Factory	1970
176	Derek and the Dominos	Layla and Other Assorted Love Songs	1970
177	Miles Davis	Bitches Brew	1970
178	Spirit	Twelve Dreams of Dr. Sardonicus	1970
179	Black Sabbath	Black Sabbath	1970
180	The Doors	Morrison Hotel	1970
181	The Carpenters	Close to You	1970
182	Stephen Stills	Stephen Stills	1970
183	John Lennon	John Lennon/Plastic Ono Band	1970
184	Crosby, Stills, Nash & Young	Déjà Vu	1970
185	Black Sabbath	Paranoid	1970
186	Neil Young	After the Gold Rush	1970
187	Led Zeppelin	Led Zeppelin III	1970
188	Deep Purple	Deep_Purple_in_Rock	1970
189	Van Morrison	Moondance	1970
190	Grateful Dead	American Beauty	1970
191	Nick Drake	Bryter Layter	1970
192	Ananda Shankar	Ananda Shankar	1970
193	The Who	Live at Leeds	1970
194	Soft Machine	Third	1970
195	Rod Stewart	Gasoline Alley	1970
196	George Harrison	All Things Must Pass	1970
197	Simon & Garfunkel	Bridge over Troubled Water	1970
198	Cat Stevens	Tea for the Tillerman	1970
199	Traffic	John Barleycorn Must Die	1970
200	The Stooges	Fun House	1970
201	James Taylor	Sweet Baby James	1970
202	Paul McCartney	McCartney	1970
203	Santana	Abraxas	1970
204	Syd Barrett	The Madcap Laughs	1970
205	Jethro Tull	Aqualung	1971
206	David Crosby	If I Could Only Remember My Name	1971
207	Sly & the Family Stone	There's a Riot Goin' On	1971
208	Marvin Gaye	What's Going On	1971
209	Yes	The Yes Album	1971
210	Bee Gees	Trafalgar	1971
211	The Who	Who's Next	1971
212	Carole King	Tapestry	1971
213	Isaac Hayes	Shaft	1971
214	The Allman Brothers Band	At Fillmore East	1971
215	The Rolling Stones	Sticky Fingers	1971
216	John Lennon	Imagine	1971
217	The Beach Boys	Surf's Up	1971
218	Yes	Fragile	1971
219	The Doors	L.A. Woman	1971
220	Can	Tago Mago	1971
221	Elton John	Madman Across the Water	1971
222	Dolly Parton	Coat of Many Colors	1971
223	Don McLean	American Pie	1971
224	Emerson, Lake & Palmer	Tarkus	1971
225	Led Zeppelin	Led Zeppelin IV	1971
226	Serge Gainsbourg	Histoire de Melody Nelson	1971
227	Rod Stewart	Every Picture Tells a Story	1971
228	Emerson, Lake & Palmer	Pictures at an Exhibition	1971
229	Leonard Cohen	Songs of Love and Hate	1971
230	Joni Mitchell	Blue	1971
231	Funkadelic	Maggot Brain	1971
232	Janis Joplin	Pearl	1971
233	Fela Kuti & Ginger Baker	Live!	1971
234	Faces	A Nod Is As Good As a Wink... to a Blind Horse	1971
235	The Flamin' Groovies	Teenage Head	1971
236	Gene Clark	White Light	1971
237	John Prine	John Prine	1971
238	Harry Nilsson	Nilsson Schmilsson	1971
239	T. Rex	Electric Warrior	1971
240	David Bowie	Hunky Dory	1971
241	Randy Newman	Sail Away	1972
242	Deep Purple	Machine Head	1972
243	Big Star	#1 Record	1972
244	Black Sabbath	Vol. 4	1972
245	Steely Dan	Can't Buy a Thrill	1972
246	Neil Young	Harvest	1972
247	Curtis Mayfield	Superfly	1972
248	Slade	Slayed?	1972
249	Deep Purple	Made in Japan	1972
250	Yes	Close to the Edge	1972
251	Lou Reed	Transformer	1972
252	Hugh Masekela	Home Is Where the Music Is	1972
253	Milton Nascimento & Lô Borges	Clube da Esquina	1972
254	Todd Rundgren	Something/Anything?	1972
255	Nitty Gritty Dirt Band	Will the Circle Be Unbroken	1972
256	Stevie Wonder	Talking Book	1972
257	Stephen Stills	Manassas	1972
258	T. Rex	The Slider	1972
259	David Ackles	American Gothic	1972
260	Eagles	The Eagles	1972
261	Tim Buckley	Greetings from L.A.	1972
262	Nick Drake	Pink Moon	1972
263	Paul Simon	Paul Simon	1972
264	Roxy Music	Roxy Music	1972
265	Alice Cooper	School's Out	1972
266	The Temptations	All Directions	1972
267	David Bowie	The Rise and Fall of Ziggy Stardust and the Spiders from Mars	1972
268	War	The World Is a Ghetto	1972
269	Al Green	Let's Stay Together	1972
270	The Rolling Stones	Exile on Main St.	1972
271	Lynyrd Skynyrd	(pronounced 'lĕh-'nérd 'skin-'nérd)	1972
272	Incredible Bongo Band	Bongo Rock	1973
273	David Bowie	Aladdin Sane	1973
274	King Crimson	Larks' Tongues in Aspic	1973
275	Bob Marley & the Wailers	Catch a Fire	1973
276	Hawkwind	Space Ritual	1973
277	John Cale	Paris 1919	1973
278	Can	Future Days	1973
279	Lou Reed	Berlin	1973
280	Genesis	Selling England by the Pound	1973
281	Marvin Gaye	Let's Get It On	1973
282	John Martyn	Solid Air	1973
283	Roxy Music	For Your Pleasure	1973
284	Faust	Faust IV	1973
285	Herbie Hancock	Head Hunters	1973
286	Mott the Hoople	Mott	1973
287	Mike Oldfield	Tubular Bells	1973
288	Todd Rundgren	A Wizard, a True Star	1973
289	Elton John	Goodbye Yellow Brick Road	1973
290	Steely Dan	Countdown to Ecstasy	1973
291	Waylon Jennings	Honky Tonk Heroes	1973
292	Pink Floyd	The Dark Side of the Moon	1973
293	Stevie Wonder	Innervisions	1973
294	ZZ Top	Tres Hombres	1973
295	Paul McCartney & Wings	Band on the Run	1973
296	The Sensational Alex Harvey Band	Next...	1973
297	Alice Cooper	Billion Dollar Babies	1973
298	Iggy & the Stooges	Raw Power	1973
299	The Isley Brothers	3 + 3	1973
300	The New York Dolls	New York Dolls	1973
301	Brian Eno	Here Come the Warm Jets	1974
302	Bad Company	Bad Company	1974
303	Genesis	The Lamb Lies Down on Broadway	1974
304	Shuggie Otis	Inspiration Information	1974
305	Stevie Wonder	Fulfillingness' First Finale	1974
306	Eric Clapton	461 Ocean Boulevard	1974
307	Kraftwerk	Autobahn	1974
308	Van Morrison	It's Too Late to Stop Now	1974
309	Joni Mitchell	Court and Spark	1974
310	Queen	Queen II	1974
311	Roxy Music	Country Life	1974
312	Tangerine Dream	Phaedra	1974
313	Sparks	Kimono My House	1974
314	Supertramp	Crime of the Century	1974
315	Richard & Linda Thompson	I Want to See the Bright Lights Tonight	1974
316	Gil Scott-Heron & Brian Jackson	Winter in America	1974
317	Queen	Sheer Heart Attack	1974
318	10cc	Sheet Music	1974
319	Neil Young	On the Beach	1974
320	George Jones	The Grand Tour	1974
321	Gene Clark	No Other	1974
322	Steely Dan	Pretzel Logic	1974
323	Randy Newman	Good Old Boys	1974
324	Bob Marley & the Wailers	Natty Dread	1974
325	Robert Wyatt	Rock Bottom	1974
326	Gram Parsons	Grievous Angel	1974
327	Brian Eno	Another Green World	1975
328	The Dictators	Go Girl Crazy!	1975
329	Neu!	Neu! '75	1975
330	Led Zeppelin	Physical Graffiti	1975
331	Keith Jarrett	The Köln Concert	1975
332	Aerosmith	Toys in the Attic	1975
333	David Bowie	Young Americans	1975
334	Burning Spear	Marcus Garvey	1975
335	Bruce Springsteen	Born to Run	1975
336	Emmylou Harris	Pieces of the Sky	1975
337	Dion	Born to Be With You	1975
338	Joni Mitchell	The Hissing of Summer Lawns	1975
339	Tom Waits	Nighthawks At The Diner	1975
340	Rahul Dev Burman	Shalimar	1975
341	Neil Young	Tonight's the Night	1975
342	Bob Dylan	Blood on the Tracks	1975
343	Patti Smith	Horses	1975
344	Pink Floyd	Wish You Were Here	1975
345	Queen	A Night at the Opera	1975
346	Willie Nelson	Red Headed Stranger	1975
347	Earth, Wind and Fire	That's the Way of the World	1975
348	Curtis Mayfield	There's No Place Like America Today	1975
349	Tom Petty and the Heartbreakers	Tom Petty and the Heartbreakers	1976
350	The Modern Lovers	The Modern Lovers	1976
351	David Bowie	Station to Station	1976
352	Joni Mitchell	Hejira	1976
353	Boston	Boston	1976
354	Eagles	Hotel California	1976
355	ABBA	Arrival	1976
356	Kiss	Destroyer	1976
357	Rush	2112	1976
358	Jorge Ben Jor	África Brasil	1976
359	Joan Armatrading	Joan Armatrading	1976
360	Aerosmith	Rocks	1976
361	Parliament	Mothership Connection	1976
362	Penguin Cafe Orchestra	Music from the Penguin Cafe	1976
363	Jean-Michel Jarre	Oxygéne	1976
364	Ramones	Ramones	1976
365	Fela Kuti	Zombie	1976
366	Peter Tosh	Legalize It	1976
367	Stevie Wonder	Songs in the Key of Life	1976
368	Peter Frampton	Frampton Comes Alive!	1976
369	Brian Eno	Before and After Science	1977
370	Kraftwerk	Trans-Europe Express	1977
371	Billy Joel	The Stranger	1977
372	Bob Marley & the Wailers	Exodus	1977
373	Electric Light Orchestra	Out of the Blue	1977
374	Weather Report	Heavy Weather	1977
375	Muddy Waters	Hard Again	1977
376	The Stranglers	Rattus Norvegicus	1977
377	The Clash	The Clash	1977
378	David Bowie	Low	1977
379	Steely Dan	Aja	1977
380	Wire	Pink Flag	1977
381	John Martyn	One World	1977
382	Talking Heads	Talking Heads: 77	1977
383	Fleetwood Mac	Rumours	1977
384	David Bowie	"Heroes"	1977
385	Dennis Wilson	Pacific Ocean Blue	1977
386	Suicide	Suicide	1977
387	Iggy Pop	The Idiot	1977
388	Peter Gabriel	Peter Gabriel	1977
389	Television	Marquee Moon	1977
390	Meat Loaf	Bat Out of Hell	1977
391	Elvis Costello	My Aim Is True	1977
392	Iggy Pop	Lust for Life	1977
393	Ian Dury	New Boots and Panties!!	1977
394	Sex Pistols	Never Mind the Bollocks, Here's the Sex Pistols	1977
395	Pere Ubu	The Modern Dance	1978
396	Kraftwerk	The Man-Machine	1978
397	Blondie	Parallel Lines	1978
398	Elis Regina	Vento de Maio	1978
399	Pere Ubu	Dub Housing	1978
400	The Only Ones	The Only Ones	1978
401	Elvis Costello	This Year's Model	1978
402	The Jam	All Mod Cons	1978
403	Joe Ely	Honky Tonk Masquerade	1978
404	The Adverts	Crossing the Red Sea with The Adverts	1978
405	Big Star	Third/Sister Lovers	1978
406	The Residents	Duck Stab/Buster & Glen	1978
407	Public Image Limited	First Issue	1978
408	Magazine	Real Life	1978
409	Bruce Springsteen	Darkness on the Edge of Town	1978
410	Funkadelic	One Nation Under a Groove	1978
411	Throbbing Gristle	D.o.A: The Third and Final Report	1978
412	Thin Lizzy	Live and Dangerous	1978
413	Talking Heads	More Songs About Buildings and Food	1978
414	Buzzcocks	Another Music in a Different Kitchen	1978
415	Van Halen	Van Halen	1978
416	Willie Colón & Rubén Blades	Siembra	1978
417	The Cars	The Cars	1978
418	Devo	Q: Are We Not Men? A: We Are Devo!	1978
419	Dire Straits	Dire Straits	1978
420	The Saints	Eternally Yours	1978
421	Marvin Gaye	Here, My Dear	1978
422	Willie Nelson	Stardust	1978
423	Chic	C'est_Chic	1978
424	X-Ray Spex	Germ Free Adolescents	1978
425	Brian Eno	Ambient 1: Music for Airports	1978
426	Siouxsie and the Banshees	The Scream	1978
427	AC/DC	Highway to Hell	1979
428	Sister Sledge	We Are Family	1979
429	The Crusaders	Street Life	1979
430	The Germs	(GI)	1979
431	The B-52's	The B-52's	1979
432	Holger Czukay	Movies	1979
433	The Police	Reggatta de Blanc	1979
434	The Fall	Live at the Witch Trials	1979
435	Talking Heads	Fear of Music	1979
436	Joy Division	Unknown Pleasures	1979
437	Chic	Risqué	1979
438	The Undertones	The Undertones	1979
439	The Clash	London Calling	1979
440	Japan	Quiet Life	1979
441	Marianne Faithfull	Broken English	1979
442	The Slits	Cut	1979
443	Elvis Costello	Armed Forces	1979
444	Neil Young	Rust Never Sleeps	1979
445	Gang of Four	Entertainment!	1979
446	Cheap Trick	Cheap Trick at Budokan	1979
447	Fleetwood Mac	Tusk	1979
448	Pink Floyd	The Wall	1979
449	Public Image Limited	Metal Box	1979
450	Michael Jackson	Off the Wall	1979
451	The Damned	Machine Gun Etiquette	1979
452	Gary Numan	The Pleasure Principle	1979
453	The Specials	Specials	1979

=== 1980s ===
	Artist(s)	Title	Year
454	Adam and the Ants	Kings of the Wild Frontier	1980
455	Dexys Midnight Runners	Searching for the Young Soul Rebels	1980
456	AC/DC	Back in Black	1980
457	The Cramps	Songs the Lord Taught Us	1980
458	Dead Kennedys	Fresh Fruit for Rotting Vegetables	1980
459	Peter Gabriel	Peter Gabriel	1980
460	The Soft Boys	Underwater Moonlight	1980
461	The Cure	Seventeen Seconds	1980
462	Echo & the Bunnymen	Crocodiles	1980
463	Motörhead	Ace of Spades	1980
464	Killing Joke	Killing Joke	1980
465	Judas Priest	British Steel	1980
466	Circle Jerks	Group Sex	1980
467	Talking Heads	Remain in Light	1980
468	Joy Division	Closer	1980
469	Iron Maiden	Iron Maiden	1980
470	The Undertones	Hypnotised	1980
471	The Jam	Sound Affects	1980
472	Tom Waits	Heartattack and Vine	1980
473	UB40	Signing Off	1980
474	The Teardrop Explodes	Kilimanjaro	1980
475	The Specials	More Specials	1980
476	Steve Winwood	Arc of a Diver	1980
477	The Pretenders	Pretenders	1980
478	Einstürzende Neubauten	Kollaps	1981
479	Siouxsie and the Banshees	Juju	1981
480	Heaven 17	Penthouse and Pavement	1981
481	The Go-Go's	Beauty and the Beat	1981
482	Motörhead	No Sleep 'til Hammersmith	1981
483	Soft Cell	Non-Stop Erotic Cabaret	1981
484	Orchestral Manoeuvres in the Dark	Architecture & Morality	1981
485	Brian Eno & David Byrne	My Life in the Bush of Ghosts	1981
486	Black Flag	Damaged	1981
487	X	Wild Gift	1981
488	The Psychedelic Furs	Talk Talk Talk	1981
489	The Human League	Dare	1981
490	The Gun Club	Fire of Love	1981
491	Bauhaus	Mask	1981
492	Bobby Womack	The Poet	1981
493	Tom Tom Club	Tom Tom Club	1981
494	Rush	Moving Pictures	1981
495	ABBA	The Visitors	1981
496	ABC	The Lexicon of Love	1982
497	Prince	1999	1982
498	Grandmaster Flash & the Furious Five	The Message	1982
499	Elvis Costello	Imperial Bedroom	1982
500	The Cure	Pornography	1982
501	Dexys Midnight Runners	Too-Rye-Ay	1982
502	Simple Minds	New Gold Dream (81,82,83,84)	1982
503	Madness	The Rise & Fall	1982
504	Donald Fagen	The Nightfly	1982
505	Haircut One Hundred	Pelican West	1982
506	Kate Bush	The Dreaming	1982
507	Orange Juice	Rip It Up	1982
508	Michael Jackson	Thriller	1982
509	The Birthday Party	Junkyard	1982
510	Venom	Black Metal	1982
511	Bruce Springsteen	Nebraska	1982
512	Associates	Sulk	1982
513	Iron Maiden	The Number of the Beast	1982
514	Duran Duran	Rio	1982
515	Violent Femmes	Violent Femmes	1982
516	Malcolm McLaren	Duck Rock	1983
517	Def Leppard	Pyromania	1983
518	R.E.M.	Murmur	1983
519	The The	Soul Mining	1983
520	Tom Waits	Swordfishtrombones	1983
521	The Blue Nile	A Walk Across the Rooftops	1983
522	Hanoi Rocks	Back to Mystery City	1983
523	Cyndi Lauper	She's So Unusual	1983
524	Paul Simon	Hearts and Bones	1983
525	Echo & the Bunnymen	Porcupine	1983
526	ZZ Top	Eliminator	1983
527	Eurythmics	Sweet Dreams (Are Made of This)	1983
528	U2	War	1983
529	The Police	Synchronicity	1983
530	Meat Puppets	Meat Puppets II	1983
531	Culture Club	Colour by Numbers	1983
532	Frankie Goes to Hollywood	Welcome to the Pleasuredome	1984
533	Run–D.M.C.	Run–D.M.C.	1984
534	Sade	Diamond Life	1984
535	Cocteau Twins	Treasure	1984
536	Minor Threat	Out of Step	1984
537	Van Halen	1984	1984
538	Prince	Purple Rain	1984
539	The Replacements	Let It Be	1984
540	The Style Council	Café Bleu	1984
541	Tina Turner	Private Dancer	1984
542	Echo & the Bunnymen	Ocean Rain	1984
543	Minutemen	Double Nickels on the Dime	1984
544	Lloyd Cole and the Commotions	Rattlesnakes	1984
545	Youssou N'Dour	Immigrés	1984
546	Bruce Springsteen	Born in the U.S.A.	1984
547	The Fall	This Nation's Saving Grace	1985
548	Abdullah Ibrahim	Water from an Ancient Well	1985
549	a-ha	Hunting High and Low	1985
550	Tears for Fears	Songs from the Big Chair	1985
551	Dire Straits	Brothers in Arms	1985
552	Prefab Sprout	Steve McQueen (ou Two Wheels Good)	1985
553	The Mekons	Fear and Whiskey	1985
554	Big Black	Atomizer	1985
555	Suzanne Vega	Suzanne Vega	1985
556	The Pogues	Rum, Sodomy, and the Lash	1985
557	Kate Bush	Hounds of Love	1985
558	The Smiths	Meat Is Murder	1985
559	Tom Waits	Rain Dogs	1985
560	The Jesus and Mary Chain	Psychocandy	1985
561	New Order	Low-Life	1985
562	Simply Red	Picture Book	1985
563	Dexys Midnight Runners	Don't Stand Me Down	1985
564	Scritti Politti	Cupid & Psyche 85	1985
565	Elvis Costello	Blood & Chocolate	1986
566	Afrika Bambaataa & the Soulsonic Force	Planet Rock: The Album	1986
567	Beastie Boys	Licensed to Ill	1986
568	Metallica	Master of Puppets	1986
569	The The	Infected	1986
570	Nanci Griffith	The Last of the True Believers	1986
571	Billy Bragg	Talking with the Taxman about Poetry	1986
572	Talk Talk	The Colour of Spring	1986
573	Megadeth	Peace Sells... but Who's Buying?	1986
574	Bon Jovi	Slippery When Wet	1986
575	Sonic Youth	Evol	1986
576	Slayer	Reign in Blood	1986
577	Throwing Muses	Throwing Muses	1986
578	Paul Simon	Graceland	1986
579	Run–D.M.C.	Raising Hell	1986
580	XTC	Skylarking	1986
581	Steve Earle	Guitar Town	1986
582	Bad Brains	I Against I	1986
583	Anita Baker	Rapture	1986
584	The Smiths	The Queen Is Dead	1986
585	Peter Gabriel	So	1986
586	Anthrax	Among the Living	1987
587	Dinosaur Jr.	You're Living All Over Me	1987
588	Dolly Parton with Linda Ronstadt & Emmylou Harris	Trio	1987
589	Def Leppard	Hysteria	1987
590	R.E.M.	Document	1987
591	Prince	Sign o' the Times	1987
592	The Cult	Electric	1987
593	Depeche Mode	Music for the Masses	1987
594	The Sisters of Mercy	Floodland	1987
595	George Michael	Faith	1987
596	Hüsker Dü	Warehouse: Songs and Stories	1987
597	Butthole Surfers	Locust Abortion Technician	1987
598	Astor Piazzolla & Gary Burton	The New Tango	1987
599	The Smiths	Strangeways, Here We Come	1987
600	Guns N' Roses	Appetite for Destruction	1987
601	The Jesus and Mary Chain	Darklands	1987
602	Ladysmith Black Mambazo	Shaka Zulu	1987
603	Laibach	Opus Dei	1987
604	Napalm Death	Scum	1987
605	Sonic Youth	Sister	1987
606	The Triffids	Calenture	1987
607	Michael Jackson	Bad	1987
608	Pet Shop Boys	Actually	1987
609	U2	The Joshua Tree	1987
610	Terence Trent D'Arby	Introducing the Hardline According to Terence Trent D'Arby	1987
611	The Pogues	If I Should Fall from Grace with God	1988
612	Leonard Cohen	I'm Your Man	1988
613	The Waterboys	Fisherman's Blues	1988
614	Fishbone	Truth and Soul	1988
615	Everything but the Girl	Idlewild	1988
616	Living Colour	Vivid	1988
617	Mudhoney	Superfuzz Bigmuff	1988
618	R.E.M.	Green	1988
619	Happy Mondays	Bummed	1988
620	The Go-Betweens	16 Lovers Lane	1988
621	Cowboy Junkies	The Trinity Session	1988
622	Tracy Chapman	Tracy Chapman	1988
623	My Bloody Valentine	Isn't Anything	1988
624	Pixies	Surfer Rosa	1988
625	Metallica	...And Justice for All	1988
626	Dinosaur Jr.	Bug	1988
627	Dagmar Krause	Tank Battles	1988
628	k.d. lang	Shadowland	1988
629	American Music Club	California	1988
630	Morrissey	Viva Hate	1988
631	Sonic Youth	Daydream Nation	1988
632	The Sugarcubes	Life's Too Good	1988
633	Dwight Yoakam	Buenas Noches From a Lonely Room	1988
634	Jane's Addiction	Nothing's Shocking	1988
635	Public Enemy	It Takes a Nation of Millions to Hold Us Back	1988
636	Faith No More	The Real Thing	1989
637	Lenny Kravitz	Let Love Rule	1989
638	John Lee Hooker	The Healer	1989
639	New Order	Technique	1989
640	Madonna	Like a Prayer	1989
641	Queen Latifah	All Hail the Queen	1989
642	Spacemen 3	Playing with Fire	1989
643	Firehose	Fromohio	1989
644	Beastie Boys	Paul's Boutique	1989
645	The Young Gods	L'eau_rouge	1989
646	John Zorn	Spy vs Spy	1989
647	The Stone Roses	The Stone Roses	1989
648	Neneh Cherry	Raw Like Sushi	1989
649	Baaba Maal & Mansour Seck	Djam Leelii	1989
650	Kate Bush	The Sensual World	1989
651	The Cure	Disintegration	1989
652	808 State	90	1989
653	Coldcut	What's That Noise?	1989
654	Barry Adamson	Moss Side Story	1989
655	Aerosmith	Pump	1989
656	Pixies	Doolittle	1989
657	Bonnie Raitt	Nick of Time	1989
658	Fugazi	Repeater	1989
659	Soul II Soul	Club Classics Vol. One	1989
660	De La Soul	3 Feet High and Rising	1989
661	Janet Jackson	Rhythm Nation 1814	1989
662	Jungle Brothers	Done by the Forces of Nature	1989
663	NWA	Straight Outta Compton	1989

=== 1990s ===
SÀ partir des années 1990 les éditions successives ont supprimé quelques références.

Voir la colonne des 1001 pour le numéro dans la dernière édition (celle de 2021)

Les références supprimées sont marquées - (4 pour les années 1990)

	Numéro des 1001	Artist(s)	Title	Year
664	664	Cocteau Twins	Heaven or Las Vegas	1990
665	665	The Shamen	En Tact	1990
666	666	Deee-Lite	World Clique	1990
667	667	The La's	The La's	1990
668	668	The Black Crowes	Shake Your Money Maker	1990
669	669	Depeche Mode	Violator	1990
670	670	Pixies	Bossanova	1990
671	671	Megadeth	Rust in Peace	1990
672	672	Digital Underground	Sex Packets	1990
673	673	Pet Shop Boys	Behaviour	1990
674	674	Happy Mondays	Pills 'n' Thrills and Bellyaches	1990
675	675	George Michael	Listen Without Prejudice, Vol. 1	1990
676	676	Neil Young	Ragged Glory	1990
677	677	Ice Cube	AmeriKKKa's Most Wanted	1990
678	678	Jane's Addiction	Ritual de lo Habitual	1990
679	679	LL Cool J	Mama Said Knock You Out	1990
680	680	Public Enemy	Fear of a Black Planet	1990
681	681	Sinéad O'Connor	I Do Not Want What I Haven't Got	1990
682	682	A Tribe Called Quest	People's Instinctive Travels and the Paths of Rhythm	1990
683	683	Sonic Youth	Goo	1990
684	684	Ride	Nowhere	1990
685	685	My Bloody Valentine	Loveless	1991
686	686	Nirvana	Nevermind	1991
687	687	Crowded House	Woodface	1991
688	688	Cypress Hill	Cypress Hill	1991
689	689	Julian Cope	Peggy Suicide	1991
690	690	Gang Starr	Step in the Arena	1991
691	691	MC Solaar	Qui sème le vent récolte le tempo	1991
692	692	Jah Wobble	Rising Above Bedlam	1991
693	693	Red Hot Chili Peppers	Blood Sugar Sex Magik	1991
694	694	Ice-T	O.G. Original Gangster	1991
695	695	Mudhoney	Every Good Boy Deserves Fudge	1991
696	696	Public Enemy	Apocalypse 91... The Enemy Strikes Black	1991
697	697	A Tribe Called Quest	The Low End Theory	1991
698	698	Pearl Jam	Ten	1991
699	699	Saint Etienne	Foxbase Alpha	1991
700	700	Sepultura	Arise	1991
701	701	Slint	Spiderland	1991
702	702	U2	Achtung Baby	1991
703	703	The KLF	The White Room	1991
704	704	Massive Attack	Blue Lines	1991
705	705	Primal Scream	Screamadelica	1991
706	706	Teenage Fanclub	Bandwagonesque	1991
707	707	Metallica	Metallica (well known as Black Album)	1991
708	708	Pavement	Slanted and Enchanted	1992
709	709	Aphex Twin	Selected Ambient Works 85-92	1992
710	710	Arrested Development	3 Years, 5 Months & 2 Days in the Life Of...	1992
711	711	Koffi Olomidé	Haut de gamme/Koweït, rive gauche (fr)	1992
712	712	Morrissey	Your Arsenal	1992
713	713	Baaba Maal	Lam Toro	1992
714	714	The Lemonheads	It's a Shame About Ray	1992
715	715	Rage Against the Machine	Rage Against the Machine	1992
716	716	The Disposable Heroes of Hiphoprisy	Hypocrisy Is the Greatest Luxury	1992
717	717	k.d. lang	Ingénue	1992
718	718	Dr. Dre	The Chronic	1992
719	719	R.E.M.	Automatic for the People	1992
720	720	The Pharcyde	Bizarre Ride II the Pharcyde	1992
721	721	Spiritualized	Lazer Guided Melodies	1992
722	722	Sugar	Copper Blue	1992
723	723	Tom Waits	Bone Machine	1992
724	724	Sonic Youth	Dirty	1992
725	725	Stereo MCs	Connected	1992
726	726	Ministry	Psalm 69: The Way to Succeed and the Way to Suck Eggs	1992
727	727	Tori Amos	Little Earthquakes	1992
728	728	Ice Cube	The Predator	1992
729	729	Pantera	Vulgar Display of Power	1992
730	730	Alice in Chains	Dirt	1992
731	731	Nick Cave and the Bad Seeds	Henry's Dream	1992
732	732	Nusrat Fateh Ali Khan	Devotional Songs	1992
733	733	PJ Harvey	Dry	1992
734	734	Suede	Suede	1993
735	735	Paul Weller	Wild Wood	1993
736	736	The Smashing Pumpkins	Siamese Dream	1993
737	737	The Auteurs	New Wave	1993
738	738	Liz Phair	Exile in Guyville	1993
739	739	The Afghan Whigs	Gentlemen	1993
740	740	Aimee Mann	Whatever	1993
741	741	Grant Lee Buffalo	Fuzzy	1993
742	742	Nirvana	In Utero	1993
743	743	Jamiroquai	Emergency on Planet Earth	1993
744	744	Pet Shop Boys	Very	1993
745	745	PJ Harvey	Rid of Me	1993
746	746	Blur	Modern Life is Rubbish	1993
747	747	Sheryl Crow	Tuesday Night Music Club	1993
748	748	The Fall	The Infotainment Scan	1993
749	749	Wu-Tang Clan	Enter the Wu-Tang (36 Chambers)	1993
750	750	Björk	Debut	1993
751	751	Orbital	Orbital 2 (swell known as Brown Album)	1993
752	752	Snoop Doggy Dogg	Doggystyle	1993
753	753	Sebadoh	Bubble and Scrape	1993
754	754	The Boo Radleys	Giant Steps	1993
755	755	William Orbit	Strange Cargo III	1993
756	756	Girls Against Boys	Venus Luxure No.1 Baby	1993
757	757	Method Man	Tical	1994
758	758	Frank Black	Teenager of the Year	1994
759	759	Jeru the Damaja	The Sun Rises in the East	1994
760	760	Pavement	Crooked Rain, Crooked Rain	1994
761	761	Portishead	Dummy	1994
762	762	The Sabres of Paradise	Haunted Dancehall	1994
763	763	Nas	Illmatic	1994
764	764	Beastie Boys	Ill Communication	1994
765	765	Elvis Costello	Brutal Youth	1994
766	766	Morrissey	Vauxhall and I	1994
767	767	TLC	CrazySexyCool	1994
768	768	Oasis	Definitely Maybe	1994
769	769	Soundgarden	Superunknown	1994
770	770	The Offspring	Smash	1994
771	771	Drive Like Jehu	Yank Crime	1994
772	772	Blur	Parklife	1994
773	773	G. Love and Special Sauce	G. Love and Special Sauce	1994
774	774	Ali Farka Touré	Talking Timbuktu	1994
775	775	Hole	Live Through This	1994
776	776	Massive Attack	Protection	1994
777	777	Manic Street Preachers	The Holy Bible	1994
778	778	Suede	Dog Man Star	1994
779	779	The Notorious B.I.G.	Ready to Die	1994
780	780	Jeff Buckley	Grace	1994
781	781	Orbital	Snivilisation	1994
782	782	Nirvana	MTV Unplugged in New York	1994
783	783	Nine Inch Nails	The Downward Spiral	1994
784	784	The Prodigy	Music for the Jilted Generation	1994
785	785	Green Day	Dookie	1994
786	786	Foo Fighters	Foo Fighters	1995
787	787	Garbage	Garbage	1995
788	788	Nightmares on Wax	Smokers Delight	1995
789	789	Tricky	Maxinquaye	1995
790	790	Raekwon	Only Built 4 Cuban Linx…	1995
791	791	The Smashing Pumpkins	Mellon Collie and the Infinite Sadness	1995
792	792	Rocket from the Crypt	Scream, Dracula, Scream!	1995
793	793	The Chemical Brothers	Exit Planet Dust	1995
794	794	2Pac	Me Against the World	1995
795	795	Elastica	Elastica	1995
796	796	Supergrass	I Should Coco	1995
797	797	Radiohead	The Bends	1995
798	798	Guided by Voices	Alien Lanes	1995
799	799	Femi Kuti	Femi Kuti	1995
800	800	The Verve	A Northern Soul	1995
801	801	Genius / GZA	Liquid Swords	1995
802	802	Pulp	Different Class	1995
803	803	Leftfield	Leftism	1995
804	804	D'Angelo	Brown Sugar	1995
805	805	Oasis	(What's the Story) Morning Glory?	1995
806	806	Goldie	Timeless	1995
807	807	Alanis Morissette	Jagged Little Pill	1995
808	808	Screaming Trees	Dust	1996
809	809	Super Furry Animals	Fuzzy Logic	1996
810	810	Fatboy Slim	Better Living Through Chemistry	1996
811	811	Dr. Octagon	Dr. Octagonecologyst	1996
812	812	Stereolab	Emperor Tomato Ketchup	1996
813	813	Tortoise	Millions Now Living Will Never Die	1996
814	814	Beck	Odelay	1996
815	815	Belle and Sebastian	Tigermilk	1996
816	816	DJ Shadow	Endtroducing.....	1996
817	817	Eels	Beautiful Freak	1996
818	818	The Divine Comedy	Casanova	1996
819	819	Fiona Apple	Tidal	1996
820	820	Wilco	Being There	1996
821	821	Sepultura	Roots	1996
822	822	Barry Adamson	Oedipus Schmoedipus	1996
823	823	Fun Lovin' Criminals	Come Find Yourself	1996
824	824	Maxwell	Maxwell's Urban Hang Suite	1996
825	825	The Charlatans	Tellin' Stories	1996
826	826	Manic Street Preachers	Everything Must Go	1996
827	827	Everything but the Girl	Walking Wounded	1996
828	828	Nick Cave and the Bad Seeds	Murder Ballads	1996
829	829	LTJ Bukem	Logical Progression	1996
830	830	Underworld	Second Toughest in the Infants	1996
831	831	The Jon Spencer Blues Explosion	Now I Got Worry	1996
832	832	The Cardigans	First Band on the Moon	1996
833	833	Marilyn Manson	Antichrist Superstar	1996
834	834	Fugees	The Score	1996
835	835	Ash	1977	1996
836	836	Belle and Sebastian	If You're Feeling Sinister	1996
837	837	Blur	Blur	1997
838	838	Radiohead	OK Computer	1997
839	839	Finley Quaye	Maverick a Strike	1997
840	840	Missy 'Misdemeanor' Elliott	Supa Dupa Fly	1997
841	841	The Chemical Brothers	Dig Your Own Hole	1997
842	842	Primal Scream	Vanishing Point	1997
843	843	Robert Wyatt	Shleep	1997
844	844	David Holmes	Let's Get Killed	1997
845	845	Sleater-Kinney	Dig Me Out	1997
846	846	The Prodigy	The Fat of the Land	1997
847	847	Buena Vista Social Club	Buena Vista Social Club	1997
848	848	Nick Cave and the Bad Seeds	The Boatman's Call	1997
849	849	The Divine Comedy	A Short Album About Love	1997
850	850	Cornershop	When I Was Born for the 7th Time	1997
851	851	Daft Punk	Homework	1997
852	852	Robbie Williams	Life Thru a Lens	1997
853	853	Mariah Carey	Butterfly	1997
854	854	Supergrass	In It for the Money	1997
855	855	Bob Dylan	Time Out of Mind	1997
856	856	Roni Size & Reprazent	New Forms	1997
857	857	Elliott Smith	Either/Or	1997
858	858	The Verve	Urban Hymns	1997
859	859	Spiritualized	Ladies and Gentlemen We Are Floating in Space	1997
860	-	The Dandy Warhols	…The Dandy Warhols Come Down	1997
861	860	System of a Down	System of a Down	1998
862	861	Bob Dylan	The Bootleg Series Vol. 4: Bob Dylan Live 1966, The "Royal Albert Hall" Concert	1998
863	862	Manu Chao	Clandestino	1998
864	863	Billy Bragg & Wilco	Mermaid Avenue	1998
865	864	Turbonegro	Apocalypse Dudes	1998
866	865	Fatboy Slim	You've Come a Long Way, Baby	1998
867	866	David Gray	White Ladder	1998
868	867	Lucinda Williams	Car Wheels on a Gravel Road	1998
869	868	Pulp	This Is Hardcore	1998
870	869	Madonna	Ray of Light	1998
871	870	Lauryn Hill	The Miseducation of Lauryn Hill	1998
872	871	Hole	Celebrity Skin	1998
873	872	Mercury Rev	Deserter's Songs	1998
874	873	Queens of the Stone Age	Queens of the Stone Age	1998
875	874	Air	Moon Safari	1998
876	875	Talvin Singh	Ok	1998
877	876	Korn	Follow the Leader	1998
878	877	Khaled	Kenza	1999
879	878	Kid Rock	Devil Without a Cause	1998
880	879	Boards of Canada	Music Has the Right to Children	1998
881	880	Suba	São Paulo Confessions	1999
882	881	XTC	Apple Venus Volume 1	1999
883	-	Skunk Anansie	Post Orgasmic Chill	1999
884	882	Incubus	Make Yourself	1999
885	883	The Magnetic Fields	69 Love Songs	1999
886	884	Travis	The Man Who	1999
887	885	Slipknot	Slipknot	1999
888	886	Beth Orton	Central Reservation	1999
889	887	Nitin Sawhney	Beyond Skin	1999
890	888	Death in Vegas	The Contino Sessions	1999
891	889	Moby	Play	1999
892	890	The Flaming Lips	The Soft Bulletin	1999
893	891	Les Rythmes digitales	Darkdancer	1999
894	892	Le Tigre	Le Tigre	1999
895	893	Eminem	The Slim Shady LP	1999
896	-	Britney Spears	...Baby One More Time	1999
897	894	Metallica	S&M	1999
898	895	Bonnie 'Prince' Billy	I See a Darkness	1999
899	896	Shack	H.M.S. Fable	1999
900	897	Basement Jaxx	Remedy	1999
901	898	Red Hot Chili Peppers	Californication	1999
902	899	Sigur Rós	Ágætis Byrjun	1999

=== 2000s ===
	Numéro des 1001	Artist(s)	Title	Year
903	900	Doves	Lost Souls	2000
904	901	Air	The Virgin Suicides	2000
905	902	Ryan Adams	Heartbreaker	2000
906	903	Bebel Gilberto	Tanto Tempo	2000
907	-	MJ Cole	Sincere	2000
908	904	Emmylou Harris	Red Dirt Girl	2000
909	-	Limp Bizkit	Chocolate Starfish and the Hot Dog Flavored Water	2000
910	905	Radiohead	Kid A	2000
911	906	U2	All That You Can't Leave Behind	2000
912	-	Linkin Park	Hybrid Theory	2000
913	907	Elliott Smith	Figure 8	2000
914	-	Badly Drawn Boy	The Hour of Bewilderbeast	2000
915	908	PJ Harvey	Stories from the City, Stories from the Sea	2000
916	909	Erykah Badu	Mama's Gun	2000
917	910	Coldplay	Parachutes	2000
918	911	Common	Like Water for Chocolate	2000
919	912	Mike Ladd	Welcome to the Afterfuture	2000
920	-	Red Snapper	Our Aim Is to Satisfy	2000
921	913	Eminem	The Marshall Mathers LP	2000
922	914	Goldfrapp	Felt Mountain	2000
923	-	Giant Sand	Chore of Enchantment	2000
924	915	Lambchop	Nixon	2000
925	916	Ute Lemper	Punishing Kiss	2000
926	-	Madonna	Music	2000
927	917	The Avalanches	Since I Left You	2000
928	918	OutKast	Stankonia	2000
929	-	Radiohead	Amnesiac	2001
930	919	Silver Jews	Bright Flight	2001
931	920	Björk	Vespertine	2001
932	-	Gorillaz	Gorillaz	2001
933	921	Ryan Adams	Gold	2001
934	-	Destiny's Child	Survivor	2001
935	922	The Strokes	Is This It	2001
936	923	Gillian Welch	Time (The Revelator)	2001
937	924	Gotan Project	La revancha del tango	2001
938	925	The White Stripes	White Blood Cells	2001
939	-	The Beta Band	Hot Shots II	2001
940	926	Jay-Z	The Blueprint	2001
941	927	Röyksopp	Melody A.M.	2001
942	928	Drive-By Truckers	Southern Rock Opera	2001
943	929	Super Furry Animals	Rings Around the World	2001
944	-	The Hives	Your New Favourite Band	2001
945	930	Jurassic 5	Power in Numbers	2002
946	931	Wilco	Yankee Hotel Foxtrot	2002
947	-	Ms Dynamite	A Little Deeper	2002
948	-	The Bees	Sunshine Hit Me	2002
949	-	Norah Jones	Come Away with Me	2002
950	932	Coldplay	A Rush of Blood to the Head	2002
951	-	The Coral	The Coral	2002
952	-	Red Hot Chili Peppers	By the Way	2002
953	-	Johnny Cash	American IV: The Man Comes Around	2002
954	933	The Flaming Lips	Yoshimi Battles the Pink Robots	2002
955	-	Doves	The Last Broadcast	2002
956	934	Missy Elliott	Under Construction	2002
957	935	Bruce Springsteen	The Rising	2002
958	-	Christina Aguilera	Stripped	2002
959	936	The Roots	Phrenology	2002
960	937	Beck	Sea Change	2002
961	-	Justin Timberlake	Justified	2002
962	-	The Vines	Highly Evolved	2002
963	-	Radiohead	Hail to the Thief	2003
964	-	Amy Winehouse	Frank	2003
965	-	Calexico	Feast of Wire	2003
966	-	The Darkness	Permission to Land	2003
967	938	The White Stripes	Elephant	2003
968	939	Dizzee Rascal	Boy in da Corner	2003
969	-	Kings of Leon	Youth and Young Manhood	2003
970	-	The Thrills	So Much for the City	2003
971	940	Yeah Yeah Yeahs	Fever to Tell	2003
972	941	OutKast	Speakerboxxx/The Love Below	2003
973	-	50 Cent	Get Rich or Die Tryin'	2003
974	942	The Mars Volta	De-Loused in the Comatorium	2003
975	-	Lightning Bolt	Wonderful Rainbow	2003
976	943	Rufus Wainwright	Want One	2004
977	-	Scissor Sisters	Scissor Sisters	2004
978	-	Morrissey	You Are the Quarry	2004
979	-	Björk	Medúlla	2004
980	-	Mylo	Destroy_Rock_&_Roll	2004
981	-	Brian Wilson	Brian Wilson Presents Smile	2004
982	-	The Icarus Line	Penance Soiree	2004
983	944	Arcade Fire	Funeral	2004
984	-	Devendra Banhart	Rejoicing in the Hands	2004
985	945	Nick Cave and the Bad Seeds	Abattoir Blues/The Lyre of Orpheus	2004
986	-	Franz Ferdinand	Franz Ferdinand	2004
987	-	N.E.R.D	Fly or Die	2004
988	-	The Beta Band	Heroes to Zeros	2004
989	-	Ozomatli	Street Signs	2004
990	946	Green Day	American Idiot	2004
991	-	The Libertines	The Libertines	2004
992	-	Kanye West	The College Dropout	2004
993	-	Cee Lo Green	Cee-Lo Green... Is the Soul Machine	2004
994	-	TV on the Radio	Desperate Youth, Blood Thirsty Babes	2004
995	-	Liars	They Were Wrong, So We Drowned	2004
996	947	The Streets	A Grand Don't Come for Free	2004
997	-	Rufus Wainwright	Want Two	2004
998	-	The Killers	Hot Fuss	2004
999	-	The Zutons	Who Killed...... The Zutons?	2004
1000	-	Kings of Leon	Aha Shake Heartbreak	2004
1001	-	M.I.A.	Arular	2005
1002	-	Beck	Guero	2005
1003	-	White Stripes	Get Behind Me Satan	2005
1004	948	Common	Be	2005
1005	949	Richard Hawley	Coles Corner	2005
1006	949	Antony and the Johnsons	I Am a Bird Now	2005
1007	950	Sufjan Stevens	Come On Feel The Illinoise	2005
1008	951	Amy Winehouse	Back to Black	2006
1009	-	Lupe Fiasco	Food & Liquor	2006
1010	-	Ghostface Killah	FishScale	2006
1011	952	Ali Farka Touré	Savane	2006
1012	-	Muse	Black Holes and Revelations	2006
1013	953	Joanna Newsom	Ys	2006
1014	954	Arctic Monkeys	Whatever People Say I Am, That's What I'm Not	2006
1015	-	The Good, the Bad and the Queen	The Good, the Bad and the Queen	2007
1016	955	LCD Soundsystem	Sound of Silver	2007
1017	956	Radiohead	In Rainbows	2007
1018	957	M.I.A.	Kala	2007
1019	958	Justice	Cross	2007
1020	-	Klaxons	Myths of the Near Future	2007
1021	-	Arcade Fire	Neon Bible	2007
1022	-	Goldfrapp	Seventh Tree	2008
1023	-	Elbow	The Seldom Seen Kid	2008
1024	959	Portishead	Third	2008
1025	-	The Last Shadow Puppets	The Age of the Understatement	2008
1026	-	Kings of Leon	Only by the Night	2008
1027	-	Slipknot	All Hope Is Gone	2008
1028	960	TV on the Radio	Dear Science	2008
1029	-	MGMT	Oracular Spectacular	2008
1030	961	Fleet Foxes	Fleet Foxes	2008
1031	962	Q-Tip	The Renaissance	2008
1032	-	Grizzly Bear	Veckatimest	2009
1033	963	Animal Collective	Merriweather Post Pavilion	2009
1034	964	Bill Callahan	Sometimes I Wish We Were an Eagle	2009
1035	-	Fever Ray	Fever Ray	2009
1036	-	Wild Beasts	Two Dancers	2009
1037	965	Phoenix	Wolfgang Amadeus Phoenix	2009
1038	-	The xx	xx	2009
1039	-	Yeah Yeah Yeahs	It's Blitz!	2009
1040	-	Dirty Projectors	Bitte Orca	2009

=== 2010s ===
	Numéro des 1001	Artist(s)	Title	Year
1041	966	Beach House	Teen Dream	2010
1042	967	John Grant	Queen of Denmark	2010
1043	-	The National	High Violet	2010
1044	968	The Black Keys	Brothers	2010
1045	969	Janelle Monáe	The ArchAndroid	2010
1046	-	Arcade Fire	The Suburbs	2010
1047	-	Deerhunter	Halcyon Digest	2010
1048	970	Kanye West	My Beautiful Dark Twisted Fantasy	2010
1049	-	Adele	21	2011
1050	971	PJ Harvey	Let England Shake	2011
1051	972	White Denim	D	2011
1052	973	Django Django	Django Django	2012
1053	974	Jack White	Blunderbuss	2012
1054	975	Hot Chip	In Our Heads	2012
1055	976	Frank Ocean	Channel Orange	2012
1056	-	Kendrick Lamar	good kid, m.A.A.d city	2012
1057	-	My Bloody Valentine	M b v	2013
1058	-	David Bowie	The Next Day	2013
1059	977	Kanye West	Yeezus	2013
1060	978	Chvrches	The Bones of What You Believe	2013
1061	979	Beyoncé	Beyoncé	2013
1062	-	The War on Drugs	Lost in the Dream	2014
1063	980	FKA twigs	LP1	2014
1064	981	Taylor Swift	1989	2014
1065	982	Björk	Vulnicura	2015
1066	983	Kendrick Lamar	To Pimp a Butterfly	2015
1067	984	Songhoy Blues	Music in Exile	2015
1068	984	David Bowie	Blackstar	2016
1069	985	Solange	A Seat at the Table	2016
1070	986	Skepta	Konnichiwa	2016
1071	987	Leonard Cohen	You Want It Darker	2017
1072	988	LCD Soundsystem	American Dream	2017
1073	989	Jane Weaver	Modern Kosmology	2017
1074	-	Kelela	Take Me Apart	2017
1075	990	Lorde	Melodrama	2017
1076	-	Thundercat	Drunk	2017
1077	-	SZA	Ctrl	2018
1078	991	Hookworms	Microshift	2018
1079	992	Christine and the Queens	Chris	2018
1080	993	Kacey Musgraves	Golden Hour	2019
1081	994	Little Simz	Grey Area	2019
1082	995	Michael Kiwanuka	Kiwanuka	2019
1083	996	Nick Cave and the Bad Seeds	Ghosteen	

=== 2020s ===
	Numéro des 1001	Artist(s)	Title	Year
1084	997	Fiona Apple	Fetch the Bolt Cutters	2020
1085	998	Sault	Untitled (Black Is)	2020
1086	999	Taylor Swift	Evermore	2020
1087	1000	Lana Del Rey	Chemtrails over the Country Club	2021
1088	1001	Jazmine Sullivan	Heaux Tales	2021

== See also ==
- Album era
- All Time Top 1000 Albums
- Rolling Stone's 500 Greatest Albums of All Time
- 1,000 Recordings to Hear Before You Die
- 1001 Movies You Must See Before You Die
- 1001 Books You Must Read Before You Die
- 1001 Video Games You Must Play Before You Die
