= That Fucking Tank =

English alternative rock band

- Origin: Leeds, England
- Genres: Alternative rock, noise rock, math rock
- Years active: 2003–present
- Label: Gringo Records; Jealous Records; Obscene Baby Auction
- Members: Andy Abbott (baritone guitar); James Islip (drums)

That Fucking Tank are an alternative rock duo that formed in Leeds, England, in 2003.

== History ==
Andy Abbott (baritone guitar played through multiple amplifiers) and James Islip (drums) met in the early 1990s whilst they were still at Primary School, and aged 14 played their first gig together in Matlock as part of a short-lived band called Grin. They also played in the band Kill Yourself together. Since 2003, they have used the name That Fucking Tank.

They have performed in the UK and Europe with other bands that play their style of music including Yourcodenameis:milo, Lightning Bolt, Oxes, Melt Banana and Don Caballero.

In 2008, the duo played Reading and Leeds Festivals.

In November 2013, the band played a UK-wide tour with Foals. A nod to their connection with Foals' former band The Edmund Fitzgerald which emerged from the same scene and era.

The band have released four albums through independent record labels of the north of England.

== Obscene Baby Auction ==
The members of That Fucking Tank along with Giles Bailey and Graham Pilling started their own record label, Obscene Baby Auction, in 2001; its first incarnation running until 2007. It has released EPs and albums by That Fucking Tank, Kill Yourself, Bilge Pump and others.

== Related bands ==
The band's two members are notable musicians outside of their music in That Fucking Tank. Andy Abbott performs with Leeds supergroup (featuring members of Hookworms and Mucky Sailor) Nope, Elizabeth (solo improvisation / noise / acoustic) and Brass (with members of Shield Your Eyes and Spy vs Spy). James (Jimmy) Islip performs in punk band The Magnificent and has solo acoustic singer/songwriter act. Islip also played on Chuck Ragan's Revival Tour in 2011 and 2012. Between 2000 and 2006 Abbott and Islip played with Giles Bailey in the trio Kill Yourself.

== Philosophy ==
That Fucking Tank are long-term advocates of the DIY ethos in music.

== Musical style ==
That Fucking Tank are also known for their unusual equipment, set-up and style, among them the use of the Baritone guitar.

In 2012, Clash described their second album as a pounding and relentless mixture of punk, metal and acid house. A year later, Drowned in Sound described them as "... Britain’s answer to US noise rock duos like Hella and Lightning Bolt".

Although they act through what The Quietus called "DIY, anti-commercial channels", their records have been reviewed by national music press, such as the NME, The Skinny, and The Quietus.

== Discography ==
=== Albums ===
- Making a Meal for Beethoven on Old Baby Sex Scene compilation – Obscene Baby Auction (2004)
- The Day Of Death By Bono Adrenaline Shock – Jealous Records (2006)
- Owl End on Stench of Muscle compilation (2008)
- Tanknology – Gringo Records (2009)
- NWONWOBH split 10-inch – Brew Records (2011)
- TFT – Gringo Records CD, vinyl self-release on Obscene Baby Auction Records (2012)
- A Document Of The Last Set – Gringo Records, Vinyl/MP3 (2013)

=== Singles and EPs ===
- Document of the First Set EP – Jealous Records (2004)
- Andrew and James on split 7-inch with Grabba Grabba Tape – Gssh Gssh/OBA (2005)
- Red by King Crimson split 7-inch with Monster Killed by Laser – Run of the Mill Records (2005)
- Awesome Magnet (with Giles Bailey) picture disc 7-inch with Euro tour DVD – On the Bone Records (2007)
