= The Hum (Hookworms album) =

Studio album by Hookworms
- Released: 10 November 2014
- Recorded: Suburban Home Studios (Leeds)
- Genres: Noise rock; psychedelic rock
- Length: 37:54
- Label: Weird World
- Producer: MJ (Hookworms)

Hookworms chronology
Pearl Mystic (2013)	The Hum (2014)	Microshift (2018)

Professional ratings
Aggregate scores
Source	Rating
Metacritic	80/100
Review scores
Source	Rating
AllMusic	4/5 stars
Clash	7/10 stars
DIY (magazine)	4/5 stars
Drowned in Sound	9/10 stars
The Guardian	4/5 stars
The Line of Best Fit	9/10 stars
Loud & Quiet	9/10 stars
Mojo	4/5 stars
MusicOMH	4.5/5 stars
NME	9/10 stars
No Ripcord	7/10 stars
The Observer	3/5 stars
Pitchfork	7.8/10
PopMatters	7/10 stars
Q (magazine)	4/5 stars
Slant Magazine	4/5 stars
The Times	5/5 stars

The Hum is the second studio album and third long play record by British rock band Hookworms, released on 10 November 2014 on Weird World, an imprint of Domino. The album title relates to the phenomenon known as The Hum.

== Critical reception ==
The album received favourable reviews on release, as well as appearing in Loud and Quiet, The Drift and Piccadilly Records's top 10 records of 2014 lists.

== Track listing ==
All tracks are written by Hookworms.

No.	Title	Length
1.	"The Impasse"	2:42
2.	"On Leaving"	6:02
3.	"IV"	2:58
4.	"Radio Tokyo"	4:01
5.	"Beginners"	6:36
6.	"V"	0:39
7.	"Off Screen"	7:37
8.	"VI"	1:31
9.	"Retreat"	5:48
Total length:		37:54

Deluxe edition bonus tracks
No.	Title	Length
10.	"Ideals"
11.	"19/11/13"

== Personnel ==
Hookworms

- JN - Drums, percussion
- JW - Guitars, sleeves and design
- MB - Bass, synths
- MJ - Vocals, backing vocals, keyboards, synths, producing, recording, mixing
- SS - Guitars

Additional

- Published by Domino Publishing Co. Ltd
- Recorded by MJ at Suburban Home Studios, Leeds
- Mixed by MJ at Suburban Home Studios, Leeds
- Mastered by Alex Wharton, Abbey Road Studios
- Sleeves, design by JW (Idiot's Pasture)

== Videos ==
- "The Impasse" and "On Leaving" videos directed by Joe and Toby Mortimer, artwork by Idiots Pasture.
- Video for "Radio Tokyo" directed by Sam Wiehl.

== Charts ==
Chart (2014)	Peak position
UK Albums (Official Charts)	72
UK Independent Albums (Official Charts)	7
