= Immigrés =

Studio album by Youssou N'Dour
- Released: 1984
- Recorded: 1983–84
- Genre: World, Mbalax
- Length: 34:01
- Label: Earthworks
- Producer: Youssou N'Dour

Youssou N'Dour chronology
Nelson Mandela (1986)	Immigrés (1984)	The Lion (1989)

Immigrés is an album by Senegalese singer and percussionist Youssou N'Dour. AllMusic remarks that the album is "a good part of what put [N'Dour] on the international map".

== Critical reception ==
Professional ratings
Review scores
Source	Rating
AllMusic	3/5 stars
Robert Christgau	B+

Though the album has been criticized for its use of synthesizers, it has been praised as a showcase for N'Dour's voice. Rolling Stone described the album as "wonderfully moving," and AllMusic terms it "almost a classic".

NME ranked it number 18 among the "Albums of the Year" for 1984, and it was included in the book 1001 Albums You Must Hear Before You Die.

== Track listing ==
Except where noted, all tracks composed by Youssou N'Dour:

1. "Immigrés/Bitim Rew" – 7:03
2. "Pitche Mi" (Kabou Gueye) – 9:27
3. "Taaw" – 11:56
4. "Badou" – 5:35

== Personnel ==
- Youssou N'Dour – vocals

Le Super Etoile de Dakar

- Rane Diallo – alto saxophone, vocals
- Fefe Diambouana – tenor saxophone
- Maguette Dieng – drums, timbales
- Mbaye Dieye Faye – tumba, sabar
- Kabou Gueye – bass guitar, double bass
- Mamadou "Jimi" Mbaye – lead guitar
- Ousseynou Ndiaye – vocals
- Pape Oumar Ngom – rhythm guitar
- Alla Seck – vocals
- Assane Thiam – tama
- Benjamin Valfroy – keyboards

Production

- Daniel Bujon – mixing
- Jenny Cathcart – liner notes
- John Dent – mastering
- Youssou N'Dour – producer
