= Wonderswan (band) =

English indie rock band

- Origin: Leeds, West Yorkshire, UK
- Genres: Slacker rock; grunge
- Years active: 2008–2011
- Spinoffs: Hookworms
- Spinoff of: Grammatics, Boyracer
- Members: Michael Watts; Russell Goodinson; Sam Shipstone; Ged McGurn
- Past members: Matthew "Sergio" Guy; Robert Mann

Wonderswan were a rock band, based in Leeds, England. Formed in 2008, by former Grammatics and Boyracer, their first release was the Untitled (Bear) CD-R (2008). The next year, they released their first commercial singles, which resulted in the 2010 EP I Wish I Was Deep Instead of Just Macho. Alongside Pulled Apart By Horses and Dinosaur Pile-Up, they helped to establish the 2010s grunge revival, a movement that originated in Leeds as a reaction against the clean-production indie rock of the dominant New Yorkshire scene. Wonderswan disbanded in 2011, with its members beginning to focus on their other projects Downdime, City Yelps, Hookworms, Yard Act and Martian Scorsese.

== History ==
Wonderswan was formed following Michael Watts' departure from Grammatics. In that band, he played keyboard, but in Wonderswan he was guitarist and vocalist. He formed the band alongside Ged McGurn, who had previously been drummer of Boyracer. They rehearsed at the Rock & Roll Circus studios in Armley alongside Dinosaur Pile-Up, Pulled Apart by Horses and Buffalo Bones. Preceded by a self-released CDR, Wonderswan's first commercial release was on 4 May 2009 with the track "Hey Nature", which was included on the Dance To The Radio release 4x12" Volume 1. This was followed on 5 October by their first 7" vinyl release entitled "Furrrpile" through Good Form Club. They performed a release show for the single with support from the Acutes and Medusa Snare at Nation Of Shopkeepers on 3 October.

In 2009, they took part in the Future Sound Battle of the Bands competition at the Cockpit, which led to them playing the BBC Introducing stage at Reading and Leeds Festivals. They performed at Brainwash Festival 2009 and Live at Leeds festival 2009. They also performed at Hyde Park Unity Day 2009, on The Chemic Band and Beer Taverna Tent stage, alongside Hawk Eyes, Burning Hank and the Pablos.

In 2010 Wonderswan released a cassette tape through Sea Owl Records which received favourable reviews from Collective Zine and Drowned In Sound, who featured a download of the track Maple Syrup. A video was made for the track Super Star Destroyer which was made entirely from clips taken from Dünyayı Kurtaran Adam, a bizarre Turkish remake of Star Wars. The demo for their song "Cut It" was included on the 2010 compilation album for Rock and Roll Circus studios. They performed at Live at Reading and Leeds festivals 2010.

Wonderswan contributed to a compilation album compiled for the first annivsary of the founding of Records Records Records in 2011. They also performed at the connected live event at the Shacklewell Arms, alongside Underground Railroad and Wet Paint. They were scheduled to perform at Greetings From Beacons festival on 13 August 2011, however the festival was cancelled. In response, they performed on the same day at the Brudenell Social Club alongside Hookworms and Eagulls.

Following Wonderswan's disbandment, the members continued with their other bands and formed new ones. Ged fronted the indie-pop band Downdime, and was a member of City Yelps. Following Wonderswan's disbandment, he formed the Vat-Egg Imposition then Geddy Laurance and Michael O. Shipstone played in psychedelic outfit Hookworms, and later became a member of Yard Act. Watts played in dream pop duo Martian Scorsese. He recorded and produced the debut EP from indie-pop band This Many Boyfriends which was released via Thee Sheffield Phonographic Corporation. Michael also writes a regular TV column Mike TV for the online fanzine Kicking Against The Pricks.

== Musical style and influences ==
Critics categorised Wonderswan's music as slacker rock and grunge. They made use of lo-fi, analog recording techniques and were often self-recorded. In 2010, Collective zine credited them with "disrupt[ing] the current state of over polished indie rock". They used distorted band compositions and elements of guitar solos along with influences from shoegaze with several instrumental "sound experiments" featured on the EP I Wish I Was Deep Instead Of Just Macho. Their somewhat messy style has been described as "sloppy yet brilliant" and "beautiful chaos". In 2009, the Skinny criticised them for being two derivative of earlier slacker rock, stating "Slacker cool can't be manufactured".

The band cited influences including Sonic Youth, Guided By Voices, Dinosaur Jr., Ween, Times New Viking, Pavement, Sebadoh, Polvo, Urusei Yatsura, the Replacements, Yo La Tengo, My Bloody Valentine and Mudhoney.

Alongside Pulled Apart By Horses and Dinosaur Pile-Up, Wonderswan helped to establish the 2010s grunge revival, a movement that originated in Leeds as a reaction against the clean-production indie rock of the dominant New Yorkshire scene.

== Members ==
Final

- Michael Watts – guitar, vocals (2009–2011)
- Russell Goodinson – guitar (2009–2011)
- Sam Shipstone – bass (2009–2011)
- Ged McGurn – drums (2009–2011)

Former

- Matthew "Sergio" Guy
- Robert Mann

== Discography ==
EPs

- Untitled (Bear) – CDR, 2008
- I Wish I Was Deep Instead of Just Macho – Cassette E.P, 2010 (Sea Owl)

=== Singles ===
- "Furrrpile" – 7" Single, 2009 (Good Form Club)

=== Compilations ===
- 4 x 12" Volume 1 – Hey Nature, 2009 Dance To The Radio
- Kicking Against The Pricks Compilation No. 1 – Friends For Life (Pt. 1), 2010 KATP Tapes
- Heavy Medicine – A Stitch In Space-Time, 2010 Tally Ho! (Fanzine)
- Hilarious Consequences by Babak Ganjei – Soundtrack To The Graphic Novel – Friends For Life (Pt. 1), 2010 Records Records Records
