= Gringo Records =

British independent record label

- Founded: 1996
- Distributor: Cargo Records
- Genre: Experimental rock, DIY music
- Country of origin: England
- Location: Nottingham
- Official website: www.gringorecords.com

Gringo Records is a British independent record label based in Nottingham, England, which was founded in 1996. It is known for releasing experimental rock and its DIY ethic.

== History ==
The label formed in Colchester in 1996 from involvements in the Damn You! and No Pictures fanzines, and inspired by the International Pop Underground Convention. Its first release was a Lando/Teebo split 7″ which was given to Stuart Braithwaite of Mogwai (his former band Eska later released on Gringo Records). The label's second release, Hirameka Hi-Fi's ‘Munchin’, received radio air play from both BBC Radio 1's John Peel and Steve Lamacq which importantly saw the label gain distribution for releases. Following this San Lorenzo and Reynolds released singles on the label and the three acts regularly played live shows together as a Gringo package. With their second release on Gringo Records entitled the "Play Hard" EP Hirameka Hi-Fi received further national airplay and press coverage prompting professional interest from the music industry. Later Hirameka Hi-Fi recorded a "Session Unsigned" session for the Evening Session. The bands Wolves! (Of Greece), Reynolds and Hirameka Hi-Fi performed live for Radio 1 in 2002, and in 2003 Bilge Pump were invited to play a Peel Session. Gringo Records artists have also received mainstream press attention, such as Hookworms' album Pearl Mystic, and the label continues to be important regionally. Gringo Record's lengthy regional importance and influence was recognised with its nomination in 2013 for Best Small Label at the national AIM Independent Music Awards. Both Yannis of Foals and Bloc Party have named themselves as fans of Gringo. Gringo's That Fucking Tank toured with the Foals in 2014.

== Artists ==
=== Current ===
- Bilge Pump
- Cold Pumas
- Fists
- Grey Hairs
- Irma Vep
- Order of the Toad
- Reciprocate
- Sweet Williams
- The Unit Ama
- The Van Pelt
- Thick Syrup

=== Former ===
- Broken Arm
- Designer Babies
- Electro Group
- Empire-Builder
- Erase Errata
- Eska
- Hey Colossus
- Hirameka Hi-Fi
- Hookworms
- I'm Being Good
- Kill Yourself
- Kogumaza
- Lando
- Lords
- Ox Scapula
- Part Chimp
- Polaris
- Sailors
- San Lorenzo
- Sauna Youth
- Seachange
- Soeza
- Souvaris
- Spin Spin the Dogs
- Teebo
- That Fucking Tank
- The Wharves
- Vision Fortune
- Wolves! (of Greece)

== Discography ==
- WAAT001 - Lando / Teebo - split single (split 7-inch, 1997)
- WAAT002 - Hirameka Hi-Fi - Munchin (7-inch, 1998)
- WAAT003 - San Lorenzo - Life Without Mountains (7-inch, 1998)
- WAAT004 - Hirameka Hi-Fi - Play Hard EP (7-inch EP, 1998)
- WAAT005 - Reynolds - To Unwind To Unwound (7-inch, 1998)
- WAAT006 - Empire-Builder - Waters Of The Orient (7-inch EP, 1999)
- WAAT008 - Eska - Invent The Fortune (CD, 2000)
- WAAT009 - San Lorenzo - Nothing New Ever Works (CD/LP, 2000)
- WAAT010 - Reynolds - Field Recordings (CD, 2000)
- WAAT011 - Hirameka Hi-Fi - The Imperfect Approach (7-inch, 2000)
- WAAT012 - I Am Spartacus - Forward (CD, 2002)
- WAAT013 - Hirameka Hi-Fi - "Sprezzatura" (CD, 2002)
- WAAT014 - Electro Group / Hirameka Hi-Fi - Gringo Records Single Club #1 (split 7-inch, 2003)
- WAAT015 - Bilge Pump - Let Me Breathe (CD, 2002)
- WAAT016 - Clambake - Gator In The Pool (CD, 2002)
- WAAT017 - Seachange - A vs. Co10 (7-inch, 2004)
- WAAT018 - Kill Yourself - Soft Touch Of Man (CD, 2003)
- WAAT019 - Red Monkey / Erase Errata - Gringo Records Single Club #2 (split 7-inch, 2003)
- WAAT020 - Wolves! (Of Greece) - One Sided 10-inch (10-inch, 2004)
- WAAT021 - New Radiant Storm King / Eska - Gringo Singles Club #3 (split 7-inch, 2004)
- WAAT022 - The Intima / Soeza - Gringo Singles Club #4 (split 7-inch, 2004)
- WAAT023 - Designer Babies - Baghdad Boogie (7-inch, 2003)
- WAAT024 - Soeza - Why Do You Do? (CD, 2005)
- WAAT025 - Hey Colossus, Lords, Part Chimp, Todd - A 10 inch of Monstrous Proportions (split 10-inch, 2006)
- WAAT026 - Empire-Builder / Thunder! Thunder! Thunder! - Gringo Singles Club #5 (split 7-inch, 2005)
- WAAT027 - The Unit Ama - The Unit Ama (CD/LP, 2005)
- WAAT028 - Polaris - Polaris (CD/LP, 2004)
- WAAT029 - Lords - This Ain't A Hate Thing, It's A Love Thing (CD/LP, 2006)
- WAAT030 - Various Artists - Oh Yeah! A Gringo Records Compilation album (CD, 2006)
- WAAT031 - Souvaris - A Hat (CD, 2007)
- WAAT032 - Sailors - Sailors EP (7-inch EP, 2007)
- WAAT033 - Bilge Pump - Rupert The Sky (CD/LP, 2008)
- WAAT034 - Lords - Everyone Is People (CD/LP, 2008)
- WAAT035 - Soeza - 7 Obstacles (CD, 2008)
- WAAT036 - That Fucking Tank - Tanknology (CD, 2009)
- WAAT037 - Lords - "Good Dog Bad Dog" (Single, 2009)
- WAAT038 - Spin Spin The Dogs - Leave Me In Leicester (LP, 2010)
- WAAT039 - Bilge Pump - The Fucking Cunts Still Treat Us Like Pricks (10-inch, 2010)
- WAAT040 - Souvaris / Sincabeza - Clown Jazz (split 12-inch, 2009)
- WAAT041 - Ox Scapula - Hands Out (LP, 2010)
- WAAT042 - Part Chimp - You Decide (7-inch, 2010)
- WAAT043 - Broken Arm - Negative EP (7-inch EP, 2011)
- WAAT044 - I'm Being Good - Mountain Language (CD, 2011)
- WAAT045 - Souvaris - Souvaris Souvaris (CD, 2011)
- WAAT046 - Hookworms - Hookworms (12-inch EP, 2011)
- WAAT047 - That Fucking Tank - TFT (CD, 2012)
- WAAT048 - Hookworms / Kogumaza - Form And Function / Ursids (7-inch, 2012)
- WAAT049 - Sauna Youth - Dreamlands (CD/LP, 2012)
- WAAT050 - Cold Pumas - Persistent Malaise (CD/LP, 2012)
- WAAT051 - Hookworms - Pearl Mystic (CD/LP, 2013)
- WAAT052 - Grey Hairs - F.S.D.T. (7-inch EP, 2013)
- WAAT053 - Vision Fortune - Mas Fiestas Con El Grupo Vision Fortune (LP, 2013)
- WAAT054 - Broken Arm - Life Is Short (LP, 2013)
- WAAT055 - Fists - Phantasm (LP, 2013)
- WAAT056 - That Fucking Tank - A Document Of The Last Set (LP, 2013)
- WAAT057 - The Wharves - At Bay (CD/LP, 2014)
- WAAT058 - Grey Hairs - Colossal Downer (LP, 2015)
- WAAT059 - Hookworms - Hookworms (CD, 2016)
- WAAT060 - That Fucking Tank - China Tour 7-inch (7-inch, 2015)
- WAAT061 - The Van Pelt - Tramonto (Live In Ferrara 12.08.2014) (2×LP, 2016)
- WAAT062 - Sweet Williams- Please Let Me Sleep On Your Tonight (LP, 2016)
- WAAT063 - Cold Pumas - The Hanging Valley (CD/LP, 2016)
- WAAT064 - Grey Hairs - Serious Business (CD/LP, 2017)
- WAAT065 - The Wharves - Electa (CD/LP, 2016)
- WAAT066 - Jutland Songs - Charm on the Chain (7-inch, 2017)
- WAAT067 - Grey Hairs - On and Off EP (Single, 2017)
- WAAT068 - Thick Syrup - Living In Leeds (LP, 2018)
- WAAT069 - Bilge Pump - We Love You (CD/LP, 2019)
- WAAT070 - Grey Hairs - Health & Social Care (CD/LP, 2019)
- WAAT071 - Sweet Williams - Where Does The Time Come From (CD/LP, 2019)
