= Hookworms (band) =

English neo-psychedelic rock band

Background information
- Origin: Leeds, West Yorkshire, UK
- Genres: Psychedelic rock; post-punk; space rock; noise rock; garage rock
- Years active: 2009–2018
- Labels: Domino, Gringo, Faux Discx, Too Pure
- Spinoffs: Menace Beach, Nope, XAM Duo
- Spinoff of: Held by Hands, Wonderswan
- Past members: SS; JN; JW; MB; MJ; EG
- Website: parasiticnematode.blogspot.co.uk

Hookworms were an English five-piece rock band from Leeds. Formed in 2009 by Held by Hands and Wonderswan members, Matthew Benn (bass), Matthew Johnson (vocals), Sam Shipstone (guitar), Jonathan Wilkinson (guitar) and EG (drums), they released their first demo in 2011. In 2013, they released their debut album Pearl Mystic through Gringo Records, which led to significant critical and commericial success. Signing to Domino Recording Company, their second album The Hum was released in 2014, with a lineup shift to include drummer Jonathan Nash. Their final album Microshift was released in 2018. That year, anonymous accusations of abuse were made reported by a third party against Johnson , which led to the dissolution of the group. The band helped to establish a psychedelic rock revival in the early 2010s and their use of saxophones inspired the instrument to be used by subsequent acts Fat White Family, Black Country, New Road and Viagra Boys.

== History ==
=== Formation and early releases (2009–2013) ===
Guitarist Sam Shipstone was a founding member of Hookworms

The band was formed in 2009, by Matthew Benn (bass), Matthew Johnson (vocals) and Sam Shipstone (guitar), who had previously played in the garage punk band Held By Hands. Benn brought in his childhood friend from Halifax, Jonathan Wilkinson as a second guitarist. Shipstone also played in Wonderswan. They took the name "Hookworms", with Benn explaining in an interview from the same year, "The hookworm is a parasite that lives inside its chosen host, sucking blood and damaging the small intestine, and can occasionally lead to death if not treated or attended to properly. We’d like to think that our music works its way into our ‘hosts’, and grinds them down from the inside, bludgeoning them into submission with repetition and noise" Each member took their initials as pseudonyms, with Johnson explaining this in a 2014 interview as due to "two of the band work in education and didn't want anyone knowing their name, and one of us works in a charity offering advice to people and obviously doesn't want anyone to read some bullshit I said about us on the internet somewhere".

Their first live performance was supporting Wooden Shjips at their sold out headliner at the Brudenell Social Club on 18 April 2010. They soon became involved in Leeds' "LS6 scene", a DIY music scene with prominent acts including Bilge Pump, Brown Owl and Polaris. Hookworms helped to establish a new wave of that scene with a greater influence from psychedelic rock. Produced through MJ's own Suburban Home Studio in Leeds, All related art was done through JW's Idiot's Pasture. Hookworms released their first tape cassette EP on Sun Araw's Sun Ark/Magic Lantern label in August 2011. They were known for their live shows.

=== Pearl Mystic, The Hum and Microshift (2013–2018) ===
Hookworm's 2013 debut LP Pearl Mystic was widely praised. It was named the number 1 album of 2013 by Loud and Quiet, BrooklynVegan, and Drowned in Sound. Following the album's release they experience a major rise in popularity, which NME accredited to an appetite for psychedelic music initiated by Goat, Temples and Tame Impala, despite noting that they "have nothing to do" with each other. That year the Skinnny stated "You'd be hard-pushed to find a soul yet to extoll the virtues of Hookworms’ debut album Pearl Mystic. You’d also be hard-pushed to find a way into their headline Manchester gig". Around this time, they began to be approach by large record labels. This led them to sign to Domino Recording Company. Following the album's release, their drummer departed, replaced by Jonathan Nash. They performed at Beacons Festival 2014.

On 16 September 2014, they released the single "On Leaving", announcing it would be a part of their second album The Hum. Between 25 and 30 October, they headlined a tour of the UK. On 10 November, they released The Hum. A release show for the record took place at the Brudenell Social Club on 19 November. On 2 December, they released the single "Radio Tokyo". Their second LP The Hum also received positive critical reviews. They headlined a tour the UK between 28 February and 22 March 2015. They performed at Live at Leeds Festival 2015. They performed at Gold Sounds Festival in May 2017 alongside Cabbage, Goat Girl and Kagoule.

Their third album Microshift was released on 8 February 2018. Between 25 May and 2 June 2018, they headlined a tour of the UK and Ireland, with support from Ought, Blanck Mass and Factory Floor. NME named the album as one of "The best albums of 2018". On 23 November, the Microshift Remixes EP, which featured remixes of some tracks on Microshift.

=== Disbandment (2018) ===
On 30 October 2018, Alanna McCardle—formerly a member of Welsh group Joanna Gruesome and a former partner of Hookworms singer Matthew Johnson—took to Twitter to post a series of tweets on behalf of another unnamed woman, referred to only as 'L', who had also been in a relationship with Johnson. In the tweets, McCardle reported allegations made to her by 'L' of her experience of sexual assault by Matthew 'MJ' Johnson. Johnson issued a statement denying the accusations.

In her assessment of the allegations, McCardle called attention to the frequent and strident messages posted by the official Hookworms social media accounts as well as Johnson's own personal accounts regarding their staunch feminist and anti-abuse ethic—particularly in the context of the music industry. McCardle suggested that this was a strategy intended to somehow mitigate or distract from Johnson's alleged history of abusive behaviour. The next day, the band announced their breakup.

In the aftermath of the widely covered allegations made against the singer on Twitter which resulted in the band's breakup—Johnson appeared to remove himself entirely from social media. The website for, and most references to, his recording studio business also appear to have been largely removed from the internet. In March 2020, Johnson brought legal proceedings against McCardle and 'L' for malicious falsehood and defamation. This litigation was subsequently withdrawn in May 2021, following the withdrawal of the McCardle's blogpost.

Following the disbandment, some members focus on their side project Menace Beach. Shipstone became a member of Yard Act. In 2022, Shipstone and Benn launced the band Holodrum.

== Musical style ==
Critics categorised Hookworms' music as noise rock, post-punk, space rock, psychedelic rock and garage rock. They incorporated elements elements of krautrock pop music, shoegaze, glam rock, ambient music drone music, progressive rock, freakbeat, Kosmische Musik, techno and synth pop. Songwriter Magazine called them "psych-hardcore.

In their early work, vocals were screamed. The Hum was mostly a fusion of psychelic rock and hardcore, and included a greater use synthesisers and hooks On Microshift they moved away from post-punk and shoegaze influences, and Johnson began to sing instead of scream. Clash categorised it as dance-punk. They often made use of tremolo. Louder Than War described their sound as a merger of psychedlia and punk that sits as an inverse to the "glut of pretty-boy indie".

Hookworms originally formed with the intention to write music influenced by Pissed Jeans, Reigning Sound and Comets On Fire. Subsequent influences they cited included Spacemen 3, Magic Lantern, Rites of Spring, Fugazi, Nation of Ulysses, Make-Up, Bilge Pump, That Fucking Tank, Vibracathedral Orchestra, This Aint Vegas, Red Monkey, Field Music, The Week That Was, Kogumaza, Lords, Wolves of Greece, Bob Tilton, Modern Lovers, the Velvet Underground, LCD Soundsystem, Rolling Stones, the Gories the Mummies, Washington D.C. hardcore and hip hop.

=== Legacy ===
In 2014, Louder Than War said Hookworms were "local legends". Johnson owned Suburban Home Studios in Leeds, which NME described as "a mecca for the DIY scene" in 2018. In 2015, the publication called Johnson of the "godfather of the Leeds DIY scene" and later " one of the most prolific voices in Britain’s alternative music undertow."

In 2014, the Quietus named Hookworms as one example of how "ripe the UK to regain its heavyweight rock title belt [sic]", citing them as helping to "revitalising the psych-rock scene". They helped to establish a psychedelic revival in the 2010s, which the Guardian credited as broadened the genre's definition. In an interview with Loud and Quiet, saxophone session musician Christopher Duffin noted a major increase in bookings from rock bands following his work on The Hum (2014). The publication credited this as the beginning of a wave of rock bands adopting the instrument, which would go o nto include Fat White Family, Black Country, New Road and Viagra Boys.

Hookworms have been cited as an influence by English Teacher and Sorry. Fans of Hookworms included Shame, Bobby Gillespie, Charlotte Church, and Julian Cope, who described their 2011 EP as "an epic 26 minutes of sub-Zabriskie Point ambient road-movie heat haze-on-the-road sonic wipeout of the post-Loop variety."

== Members ==
- MB a.k.a. Matthew Benn – bass (2009–2018)
- MJ a.k.a. Matthew Johnson – vocals, keyboards (2009–2018)
- SS and EO a.k.a. Sam Shipstone – guitar (2009–2018)
- JW a.k.a. Jonathan Wilkinson – guitar (2009–2018)
- JN a.k.a. Jonathan Nash – drums (2014–2018)
- EG – drums (2009–2014)

== Discography ==
=== Studio albums ===
- Pearl Mystic – Gringo Records (UK), Domino Records (rest of world), LP/CD/MP3 (2013)
- The Hum – Domino Records, LP/CD/MP3 (2014)
- Microshift – Domino Records, LP/CD/MP3 (2018)

=== Full lengths ===
- Hookworms – Sun Ark/Magic Lantern, Cassette (2011)
- Hookworms – Gringo Records/Faux Discx, 12" LP/MP3 (2011)

=== Singles ===
- Split w/ Kogumaza – Gringo Records, 7"/MP3 (2012)
- Radio Tokyo/On Returning – Too Pure Singles Club release, 7" (2013)

=== Live releases / Compilation appearances / Remixes ===
- "Starting Line": Runners Remix – Dummy Mag, 12" single/MP3 (2011)
- Live Vol. 1 – Self release, Cassette/MP3 (2012)
- Spur: Volume One Compilation, w/ "Deu" – Magnetic Tapes, Cassette (2012)
- Live Vol. 2: WFMU session – Cardinal Fuzz, CD & DVD (2012)
- "Bodies": Mazes Remix – Fat Cat Records, Cassette/MP3 (2012)
- "Run To Your Mama": MJ Goat Remix – Rocket Recordings Record Store Day release, 12"/CD (2012)
- Psych For Sore Eyes EP compilation, w/ "The Correspondent" – Sonic Cathedral, 7" (2013)
- Live Vol. 3 – Domino Records, Rough Trade exclusive "The Hum" bonus CD (2014)
