= Seachange (band) =

English band

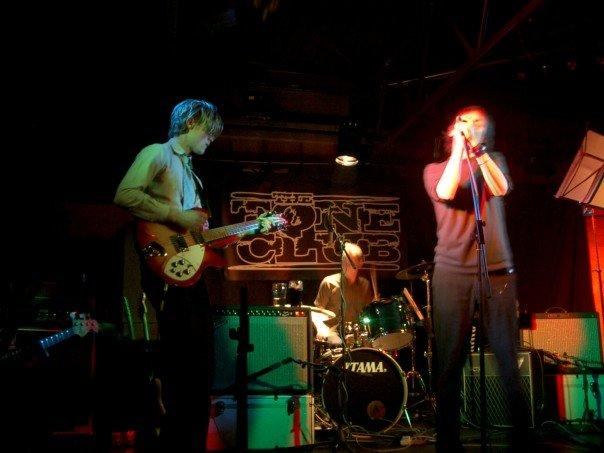
Seachange perform at the Tone Club, Nottingham Trent University's student union, January 2005

Seachange were a band from Nottingham, England, that played a mixture of melodic folk and pop with a strong influence of alternative rock.

== History ==
Seachange formed in Nottingham in 1999. They were the first British band to be taken on the roster of American indie-label Matador Records within five years. In Europe they were signed to Glitterhouse Records.

In late March 2007, the band announced their decision to split, citing external pressures and increasing involvement with other projects. Also mentioned was that several members where working on a new project (a band called Dearest) together.

== Post breakup ==
Daniel, David, Neil and Simon went on to form Dearest in 2007. A final collection of Seachange songs, The Stars Whiteout, was released digitally in August 2008.

== Critical reception ==
Pitchfork, reviewing the 2004 album Lay of the Land, found the album mixed and gave it a rating of 5.6. AllMusic gave the album 3 out of 5 stars, saying it was interesting and powerful, but could do with more focus and refinement. Drowned in Sound had a higher opinion, rating it 7, saying its songs 'inspire the imagination'.

== Line-up ==
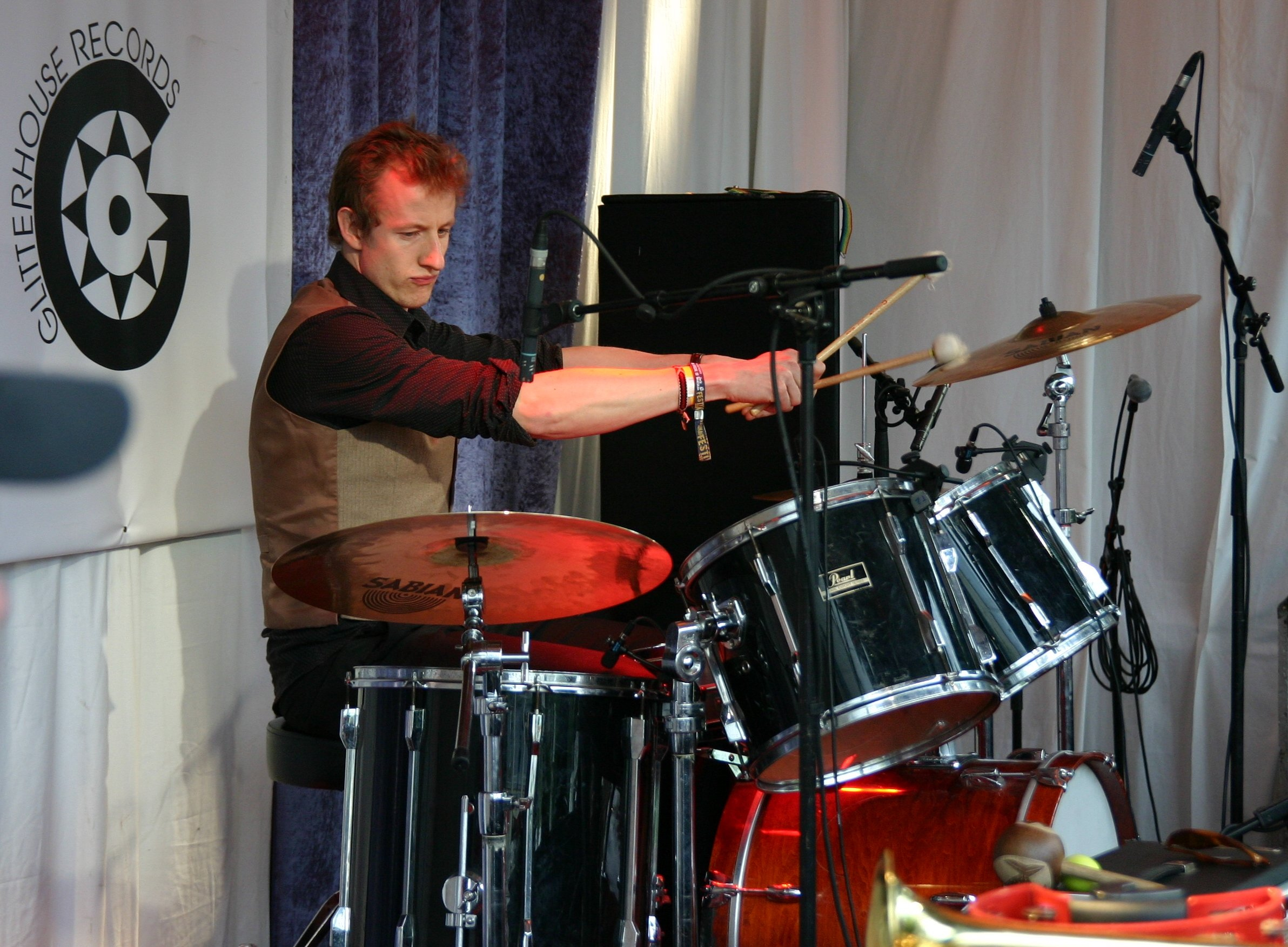
Drummer Simon Aldcroft at the Orange Bloom Special Festival, Beverungen, May 2006

- Dan Eastop (vocals)
- Adam Cormack (guitar)
- Dave Gray (guitar)
- James Vyner (bass)
- Neil Wells (multiple instruments)
- Simon Aldcroft (drums)

Alumni:

- Johanna Woodnutt (violin)

== Discography ==
=== Studio albums ===
- Lay of the Land (2004, Matador)
- On Fire, With Love (2006, for Europe: Glitterhouse)
- The Stars Whiteout (2008, A Is For Artist) digital

=== Live albums ===
- Disband in Bonn 2007 (2007, Glitterhouse)

=== Singles ===
- "A vs. Co10" (2003, Gringo Records)
- "Superfuck" (2002, Radiate)
- "News from Nowhere" (2004, Matador)

=== EPs ===
- Glitterball EP (2003, Matador)
- Fields, Chaos and Brown (2006, A is for Artist)
