= Microshift =

Studio album by Hookworms
- Released: 2 February 2018
- Recorded: Suburban Home Studios (Leeds)
- Genre: Rock
- Length: 46:39
- Label: Domino
- Producer: MJ (Hookworms)

Hookworms chronology
The Hum (2014)	Microshift (2018)

Microshift is the third studio album, fourth long play record and final album by British rock band Hookworms. It was released on 2 February 2018 by Domino Recording Company. The album's namesake is an audio plug-in. The record is dedicated to "Archie", the band's former live sound engineer.

The album was included in the book 1001 Albums You Must Hear Before You Die.

== Critical reception ==
Professional ratings
Aggregate scores
Source	Rating
AnyDecentMusic?	8.2/10
Metacritic	87/100
Review scores
Source	Rating
AllMusic	4/5 stars
The A.V. Club	B
The Guardian	5/5 stars
Mojo	4/5 stars
NME	5/5 stars
Pitchfork	7.9/10
Q	4/5 stars
Record Collector	4/5 stars
The Times	5/5 stars
Uncut	8/10

Microshift received positive reviews upon its release, with an average score of 87 out of 100 based on 18 reviews from mainstream critics on Metacritic, indicating universal acclaim.

== Track listing ==
Tracks 1–5 and 7–9 were written by Hookworms with lyrics by MJ. Track 6 was written by Alice Mérida Richards and Hookworms.

No.	Title	Length
1.	"Negative Space"	6:57
2.	"Static Resistance"	3:49
3.	"Ullswater"	7:08
4.	"The Soft Season"	4:01
5.	"Opener"	8:37
6.	"Each Time We Pass"	5:16
7.	"Boxing Day"	2:19
8.	"Reunion"	2:51
9.	"Shortcomings"	5:41
Total length:		46:39

== Personnel ==
Hookworms

- EO – guitars, backing vocals, additional percussion
- JN – drums, percussion
- JW – guitars
- MB – bass, modular synthesizer, synthesizers
- MJ – lyrics, vocals, backing vocals, keyboards, synthesizers, producing, recording, mixing

Additional personnel

- Alice Mérida Richards – additional vocals and lyrics (track 6); backing vocals – (tracks 1, 2, 4 and 9)
- Christopher Duffin – tenor and soprano saxophone on (tracks 4, 7 and 8)
- Richard Formby – additional Modular Synthesizer (track 5)
- Published by Domino Publishing Co. Ltd
- Recorded by MJ at Suburban Home Studio, Leeds
- Mixed by MJ at Suburban Home Studio, Leeds
- Mastered by Tom Woodhead at Hippocratic Mastering
- Artwork by Louis Byrne

== Charts ==
Chart (2018)	Peak position
UK Albums (Official Charts)	18
