= Objections (band) =

British post-punk band

Objections are a British post-punk band from Leeds. The band consists of Claire Adams (bass, vocals), Joe O'Sullivan (guitar), and Neil Turpin (drums). They released their debut album, Optimistic Sizing, in 2024.

== History ==
Objections recorded live sessions on BBC Radio 6 Music for Marc Riley in 2022, 2023, and 2024.

== Personnel ==
- Claire Adams Gravenhurst (band)– bass and vocals
- Joe O'Sullivan – guitar
- Neil Turpin – drums

== Discography ==
=== Albums ===
- Optimistic Sizing (Wrong Speed, 2024)

=== Singles ===
- "BSA Day / Better Luck Next Time" (Wrong Speed, 2023)

== See also ==
- Bilge Pump (band)
