= Sister Ray (disambiguation) =

"Sister Ray" is a 1968 song by The Velvet Underground.

Sister Ray may also refer to:

- Sister Ray (singer), Métis singer-songwriter
- Sister Ray, a fictional laser cannon in the video game Final Fantasy VII
- "Sister Ray", a 2021 single by Foxes (singer)
