= Bilge Pump (band) =

English rock band

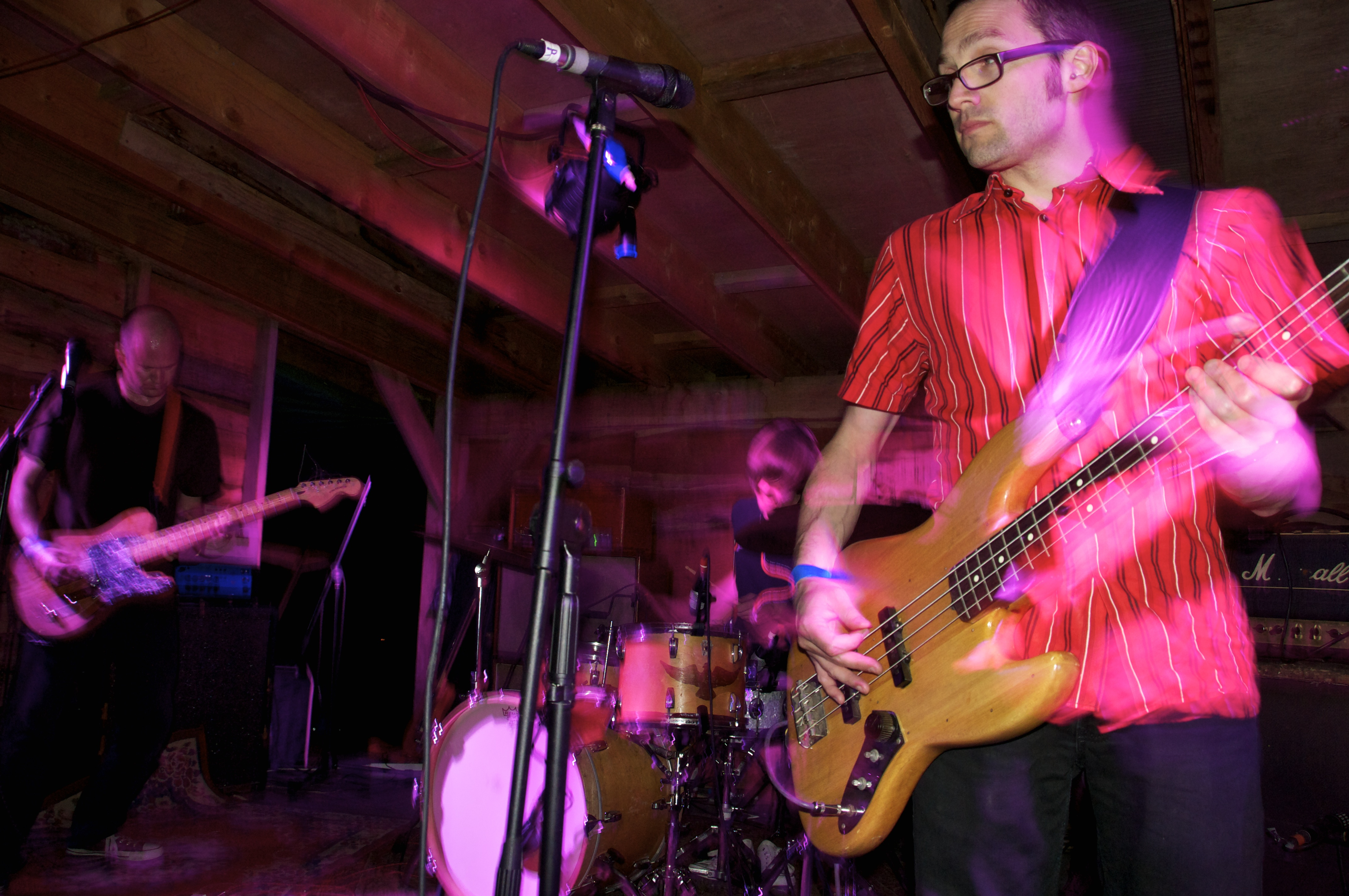
- Bilge Pump (2012)

Background information
- Origin: Leeds, England
- Genres: Post-punk, noise rock, experimental rock, avant-rock, avant-garde, avant-garde jazz, free jazz
- Years active: 1994–present
- Labels: Gringo Records
- Members: Joe O'Sullivan (guitar and vocals); Emlyn Jones (bass and vocals); Neil Turpin (drums)
- Website: bilgepump.bandcamp.com

Bilge Pump are an English rock band that formed in Leeds in the mid-1990s, featuring Joe O'Sullivan, Emlyn Jones and Neil Turpin.

== Career ==
Bilge Pump's style is post-punk with avant garde and free jazz influences. Early on, the NME described Bilge Pump's sound as "unlistenable guff". They have since had various releases on Gringo Records, Troubleman Unlimited and Unlabel, and members have been involved with artists such as Enablers, Yann Tiersen, Polaris, Felix, Chris Corsano, and HiM.

Bilge Pump recorded several John Peel Sessions, and received enough votes to be 95th on the list for ATP vs The Fans 2009. They have played with Lightning Bolt, The Mars Volta, Hella, Foals and Les Savy Fav.

== Indefinite break and Objections ==
Bilge Pump went on an indefinite break in 2021. Shortly after this Turpin and O'Sullivan teamed up with bassist/vocalist Claire Adams to form Objections.

== Discography ==
=== Albums ===
- Let Me Breathe (2002, Gringo Records) – CD
- Rupert The Sky (2008, Gringo) – vinyl/CD
- We Love You (2019, Gringo) – vinyl/CD

=== Singles and EPs ===
- The Fucking Cunts Still Treat Us Like Pricks (2010, Gringo) – 10" vinyl EP
