= See You in the Morning =

See You in the Morning may refer to:

- See You in the Morning (film), a 1989 American romantic comedy film
- See You in the Morning (album), a 2005 album by Mint Royale
