= Singin' in the Rain (song) =

Title song of the 1952 film and subsequent stage musical

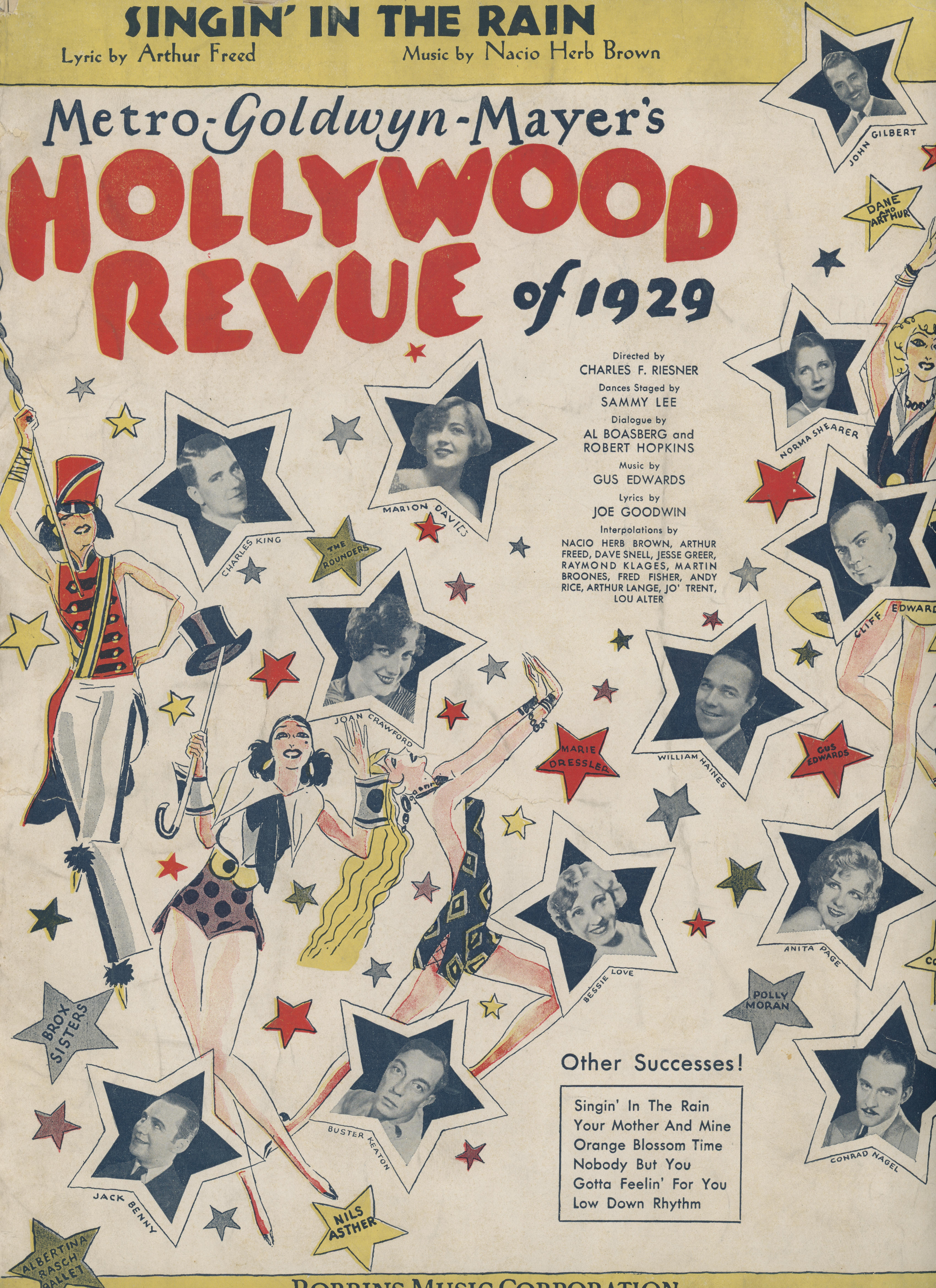
- Sheet music cover, 1929

Song by Cliff Edwards, The Brox Sisters and An All Star Cast
- Published: May 27, 1929 by Robbins Music Corp.
- Genre: Traditional pop; Jazz
- Composer: Nacio Herb Brown
- Lyricist: Arthur Freed

"Singin' in the Rain" is a song with lyrics by Arthur Freed and music by Nacio Herb Brown. Doris Eaton Travis introduced the song on Broadway in The Hollywood Music Box Revue in 1929. It was then widely popularized by Cliff Edwards and the Brox Sisters in The Hollywood Revue of 1929. Many contemporary artists have had hit records with "Singin' in the Rain" since its release, including Edwards, Earl Burtnett and Gus Arnheim. It entered the American public domain on January 1, 2025.

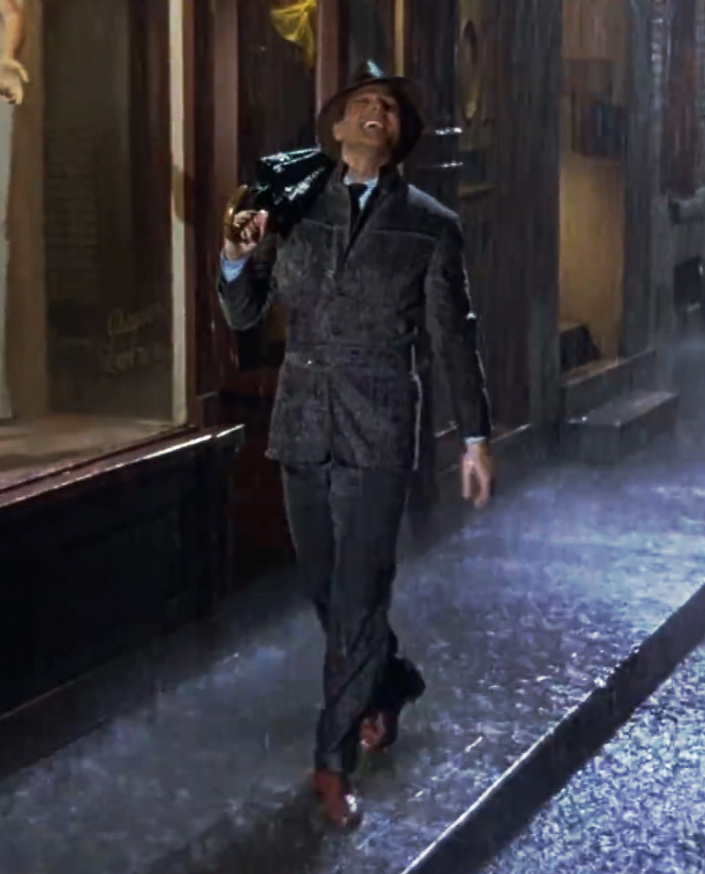
Gene Kelly performing the song in the 1952 film Singin' in the Rain

The song is famously associated with the history of cinema, as it gained popularity during the transition from silent films to "talkies." Years later, Freed, the song's lyricist, conceived the idea of the film based on the back catalogs of songs written during the era by himself and Nacio Herb Brown. That resulted in the musical film of the same name, Singin' in the Rain (1952), which is a light-hearted depiction of Hollywood in the late 1920s. The performance by Gene Kelly dancing through puddles in a rainstorm garnered the song the third spot on the American Film Institute ranking of 100 Years...100 Songs.

== Lyrics ==
=== 1929 version ===
Pitter-patter pitter-pat,
pitter-patter-pitter-pat.
Pitter-patter pitter-pat,
pitter-patter-pitter-pat.
We are not afraid of thunder.
All the time we wonder,
why is each new task a trifle to do?
Because we are living a life full of you.
I'm singing in the rain.
Yeah, singing in the rain.
What a glorious feeling,
I'm happy again.
I'm laughing at clouds,
so dark up above.
The sun's in my heart,
and I'm ready for love.
Let the stormy clouds chase
everyone from the place.
Come on with your rain,
I have a smile on my face.
I'll walk down the lane,
with a happy refrain,
and singin',
just singin' in the rain.
Why am I smiling and why do I sing?
Why does December seem sunny as Spring?
Why do I get up each morning to start
Happy and head up with joy in my heart?
Why is each new task a trifle to do?
Because I'm living a life full of you.
Pitter-patter, pitter-patter rain,
pitter-patter, singin' in the rain.

== Song form ==
Performance of the song at the end of The Hollywood Revue

The song has an unusual form. The 32-bar chorus opens the song and is followed by a 24-bar verse before the chorus repeats, in contrast to other songs of the period which often opened with a verse and contained an internal bridge.

== Covers ==
B.A. Rolfe and his Lucky Strike Orchestra recorded the song possibly as early as 1928 but perhaps 1929. The song was recorded by Annette Hanshaw backed by Frank Ferera's Hawaiian Trio (reissued on the 1999 CD Annette Hanshaw, Volume 6, 1929). It is performed on film by a nightclub band as dance music and sung in a Chinese dialect in The Ship from Shanghai (1930), by Jimmy Durante in Speak Easily (1932), by Judy Garland in Little Nellie Kelly (1940), and as background music at the beginning of MGM's The Divorcee (1930) starring Norma Shearer.

- Singer Nick Lucas recorded Singing in the Rain in 1929 (one week after recording what would become the biggest hit of his career, Tiptoe Through the Tulips).
- British duo Bob and Alf Pearson recorded the song in 1929 at their first session.
- "Singin' in the Rain" was performed in the 1930 film short Dogville Melody, presumably by Zion Myers and Jules White.
- Valaida Snow recorded it in 1935 accompanied by Billy Mason And His Orchestra - London, Apr 26, 1935 (Parlophone (E)F-165 (CE-6953-1))
- The song is sung by Dean Martin in a November 1950 episode of the variety show The Colgate Comedy Hour. He performs it while being drenched in water by comedy partner and co-host Jerry Lewis.
- The song is best known today as the centerpiece of the musical film Singin' in the Rain (1952), in which Gene Kelly memorably danced to the song while splashing through puddles during a rainstorm. The song is also performed during the opening credits of the film, and briefly near the end of the film by Debbie Reynolds.
- The song was recorded in Buenos Aires for Odeon Records twice under the title "Cantando Bajo La Lluvia," by Francisco Canaro's orchestra and with the Spanish lyrics sung by Charlo, on December 23, 1929 (Catalog Number 16243 B, matrix number 5137) and again on March 24, 1930 (Catalog Number 4631 B/LDB 78 B, matrix number 5283). It was also recorded under the same title in 1936 by the Orquesta Tipica Victor, the RCA Victor in-house orchestra in Buenos Aires.
- The song was also recorded by John Serry Sr. and his sextet ensemble in 1954 for RCA Victor records under the musical direction of Ben Selvin on an LP vinyl disc(See RCA Thesaurus).
- Vivian Blaine sang the song in "It's Sunny Again," an unsold television pilot broadcast as an episode of the ABC anthology series G.E. Summer Originals on July 3, 1956.
- In 1960, Adam Faith recorded his own version of this song on his debut album Adam.
- Bing Crosby and Rosemary Clooney recorded the song in 1961 for use on their radio show and it was subsequently included in the CD Bing & Rosie – The Crosby-Clooney Radio Sessions (2010). Crosby also included the song in a medley on his album On the Happy Side (1962).
- In 1971, Scottish folk rock-singer John Martyn did an acoustic folk jazz-version on his album Bless the Weather, where he accompanied himself on acoustic guitar and sang several overdubbed backing vocals.
- The Pasadena Roof Orchestra has covered the song on many occasions, including releasing it on The Best of the Pasadena Roof Orchestra album in 1973.
- Sammy Davis Jr. gave the song a final US chart ride with a version widely played on easy listening stations (number 16 easy listening, 1974).
- Leif Garrett released a version of the song on his 1979 album Same Goes for You.
- The song was covered by Polish musician Zbigniew Wodecki in 1979.
- In 1980, Gene Kelly reprised the song on The Muppet Show (Episode 501)
- Glenn Butcher covered this song on the Australian video ABC for Kids Video Hits.
- The song was incorporated by Michael Kamen into his score for the 1988 film Die Hard, where it is most closely associated with the character of Theo (Clarence Gilyard).
- Brazilian musician Maurício Pereira wrote a Portuguese-language version of the song, "Cantando num Toró", present in his 1995 debut album Na Tradição.
- British jazz/pop singer Jamie Cullum covered the song on his 2003 album Twentysomething.
- The song was covered in 2004 by Carmen Bradford in her Jazz album Home With You.
- In the film called Robots, when Fender says goodbye to Loretta with a blowing kiss, he happily sings a parody called "Singing in the Oil" which is to the tune of this song and dances around until he gets caught by a Sweeper.
- A version performed by the UK comedy partnership Morecambe and Wise was ranked at the top of a 2007 poll of their Greatest Moments.
- A version was also performed by Jheena Lodwick in 2006, on her album titled Singing in the rain.
- In 2009, the song was performed by Seth MacFarlane at The Proms.
- An instrumental version of this song is played in Planet 51 where the space probe Rover dances happily Gene Kelly style when he sees raining rocks.
- In 2009 and 2010 the song was performed by South Korean K-pop group Girls' Generation on their Into the New World Tour.
- In 2010, the song was sung in the intermissions of concert tour of the Irish pop band Westlife.
- In 2010, the song was sung on the FOX TV series Glee in a mash-up with Rihanna's "Umbrella" featuring Gwyneth Paltrow.
- There is a jazz instrumental by Sonny Stitt on his 1959 album Sonny Stitt Plays Jimmy Giuffre Arrangements.
- There is a jazz vocal rendition by Joe Williams on his 1984 album Then and Now.
- Diana Krall included it on her 2020 album This Dream of You.
- In 2022, the song is an important plot device in the film Babylon. It first appears in a scene set in 1928 featuring a performance being filmed to showcase MGM's "more stars than there are in heaven" sung by the studio's contract players, and it then appears more prominently at the end of the film in a scene set in 1952 in a Hollywood movie theater playing the Gene Kelly feature in Singin' in the Rain.

== Mint Royale version ==
"Singin' in the Rain"

Single by Mint Royale

from the album See You in the Morning and Pop Is...
- Released: August 22, 2005
- Recorded: 2005
- Genre: Electronic, house
- Length: 2:04 (short radio edit); 3:26 (Pop Is... version); 2:47 (See You in the Morning version)
- Label: Faith & Hope, Direction Records
- Songwriters: Nacio Herb Brown, Arthur Freed
- Producer: Mint Royale

Mint Royale singles chronology
"Wait for You" (2005)	"Singin' in the Rain" (2005)	"The Effect on Me" (2005)

"Singin' in the Rain" was remixed in 2005 by Mint Royale. It was released as a single in August 2005 after being featured in an advert for the VW Golf GTI, peaking at No. 20 on the UK Singles Chart.

Three years later in 2008, due to the exposure of the song via the performance of then-unknown dancer George Sampson on the reality TV series Britain's Got Talent, the track went to No. 1 on the iTunes Top 100 in the UK in 2008. It re-entered the UK Singles Chart at No. 28 on June 1, 2008, and climbed to No. 1 the next week, selling 45,987 copies, knocking Rihanna's "Take a Bow" down to the Number 2 spot.

Charts

Chart (2005)	Peak position
UK Singles Chart	20
Chart (2008)	Peak position
UK Singles Chart	1
Irish Singles Chart	3

== Sheila B. Devotion version ==
A 1978 disco version of Singin' in the Rain by the French pop singer Sheila B. Devotion made No. 3 in the Eurochart Hot 100 Singles and the Netherlands Top 100, No. 4 on the Nationale Hitparade, No. 11 on the German and UK Singles Chart, No. 2 on the Swedish Singles Chart, and No. 30 on the Hot Dance Club Songs.

== Taco version ==
In 1982, Dutch pop singer Taco released a version of it as his second single from After Eight, which peaked at No. 49 in Germany, No. 46 in Canada and No. 98 in the UK.

== In popular culture ==
- 1959 – The song is whistled by Cary Grant as he takes a shower after the crop duster plane attack in Alfred Hitchcock's North by Northwest.
- 1971 – "Singin' in the Rain" is sung mockingly by Alex DeLarge, played by Malcolm McDowell, in the rape scene in Stanley Kubrick's film A Clockwork Orange. The Gene Kelly version plays during the end credits.
- 1976 – In their 1976 Christmas special, the British comedy act Morecambe and Wise parodied the "Singin' in the Rain" sequence.
- 1982 – It is sung by Inspector Jacques Clouseau, played by Peter Sellers, as part of the extended version of the grocery scene from The Pink Panther Strikes Again in Blake Edwards's film Trail of the Pink Panther.
- 1986 – In the film Legal Eagles, Robert Redford "sings in the rain" watching the movie on TV during a sleepless night.
- 1989 – In the Woody Allen film Crimes and Misdemeanors, Cliff (Allen) and Halley (Mia Farrow) watch Singin' in the Rain at Cliff's apartment. Cliff claims to watch the film "every few months to keep my spirits up".
- 1990 – The song is referenced in the Terry Pratchett novel Moving Pictures. As people are infected with the dangerous idea of the clicks (movies), Mr. Dibbler, purveyor of sausages-inna-bun, dances down a wet and rainy road and swings off light poles, much to the bemusement of the city Watch.
- 1995 – The song was featured on the TV series Friends in season 2, episode 4, "The One with Phoebe's Husband", when Ross dances down the street the morning after having sex with Julie.
- 2001 – The song is often sung by Vadivelu's character "Steve Waugh" in the film Manadhai Thirudivittai to irritate Vivek's character. This inspired numerous memes and parodies in other Kollywood films after its release. The actor re-enacted the song scene briefly in the 2017 film Mersal.
- 2005 – A parody of the number "Singin' in the Rain" was featured in the animated film Robots where Fender (Robin Williams) breaks out singing and dancing after dropping off a date. Instead of 'rain' he says 'oil' to fit the film's theme, and emulates Gene Kelly's iconic swinging on the lamppost.
- 2005 – The "Singin' in the Rain" sequence was featured in a Volkswagen Golf commercial, with Gene Kelly seen breakdancing in the street. Also featured was Mint Royale's version of the song accompanying the commercial.
- 2007 – The song is sung in The Diving Bell and the Butterfly by the character of Jean-Dominique Bauby as a boy waiting with his father at the Berck railway station.
- 2017 – The 2017 Eurovision entry of Italy, Occidentali's Karma, features the phrase "Comunque vada panta rei, and Singing in the Rain".
- 2019 – The video to the BTS song "Boy with Luv" references "Singin' in the Rain".
- 2019 – The song is used as the framing device in the season 2 episode "A Happy Refrain" of Seth MacFarlane's TV series The Orville.
- 2022 – The song appears twice in the 2022 comedy-drama Babylon, first as a performance being filmed in 1928 to showcase MGM's "more stars than there are in heaven" sung by the studio's contract players, and most prominently at the end of the film in a scene set in 1952 in a Hollywood movie theater playing the Gene Kelly feature.
- 2023 – The song and the original movie clip appear as the central set piece of the third episode of the Spanish TV series La Mesías, also titled "Cantando bajo la lluvia" ("Singin' in the Rain"), in which a young Enric (Biel Rossell Pelfort) discovers the magic of cinema through it, after having been locked in a house for a decade.
- Gene Kelly's "Singin' in the Rain" sequence was one of the opening scenes of The Great Movie Ride at Disney's Hollywood Studios. Kelly approved his Audio-Animatronics likeness prior to its delivery to Florida.

=== Other appearances in film and on TV ===
- The Hollywood Revue of 1929 (1929)
- The Ship from Shanghai (1930)
- The Girl Said No (1930)
- The Woman Racket (1930)
- The Dogway Melody (1930)
- The Divorcee (1930)
- Rain or Shine (1930)
- Men Call It Love (1932)
- Speak Easily (1932)
- The Old Dark House (1932) (as "Singing in the Bath", not to be confused with 1929's "Singing in the Bathtub".)
- Skyscraper Souls (1932)
- Babes in Arms (1939)
- Idiot's Delight (1939)
- Little Nellie Kelly (1940)
- Dulcy (1940)
- Unexpected Uncle (1941)
- Maisie Gets Her Man (1942)
- Happy Go Lucky (1943)
- The Big Noise (1944)
- Big-Heel Watha (1944 M-G-M Cartoon short starring Screwy Squirrel)
- The Babe Ruth Story (1948)
- North by Northwest (1959)
- The Munsters (1965)
- El Chapulin Colorado (1978)
- Fame (1980)
- Pennies from Heaven (1981)
- Paddington Goes to the Movies (1983 T.V. special)
- The Slugger's Wife (1985)
- Fever Pitch (1985)
- Legal Eagles (1986)
- Punchline (1988)
- Die Hard (1988)
- What About Bob? (1991)
- Jeeves and Wooster (1991)
- Léon: The Professional (1994)
- Godzilla (1998)
- Shanghai Knights (2003)
- Robots (2005) (as "Singin' in the Oil")
- Kara no Kyōkai (Murder Speculation Part 1, "The Hollow Shrine") (2008)
- Glee (TV, episode "The Substitute" (2010))
- Phineas and Ferb (TV, 2011) {partly sung by Dr. Doofenshmirtz with altered lyrics in the episode "The Great Indoors"}
- Babylon (2022)
- La Mesías (2023)
