= Mint Royale =

British electronic music producer and former duo

- Origin: Manchester, England
- Genres: Electronic, trip hop, house, alternative dance
- Years active: 1997–2016; 2020–present
- Labels: Faith & Hope
- Members: Neil Claxton
- Past members: Chris Baker
- Website: mint-royale.com

Mint Royale is an English electronic music act from Manchester founded by Neil Claxton and Chris Baker in 1997. Baker left the band in 2004, with Claxton adopting the moniker as a solo act.

Championed by Fatboy Slim including their songs in his DJ sets, the act is best known for the UK top 40 singles "Don't Falter", "The Sexiest Man in Jamaica", "Blue Song" and "Singin' in the Rain" from the studio albums On the Ropes (1999), Dancehall Places (2002) and See You in the Morning (2005).

== Career ==
=== 1997–2001: Early success and first album ===
Mint Royale first specialised in remixes, and became known after the release of their mix of "Tequila" by Terrorvision was a number 2 hit in the charts. They were championed by big beat pioneer Norman Cook, aka Fatboy Slim, whose DJ sets regularly included their songs. Their sound was similar to his, to the extent that some people mistakenly believed Mint Royale to be a pseudonym for Cook himself. Their first album, On the Ropes, was released in late 1999, and achieved recognition. The single "Don't Falter", featuring Lauren Laverne from Kenickie, was a Top 20 hit in the British charts. The song "From Rusholme with Love" has been made recognisable through its extensive use in film and television series soundtracks. Predating Mint Royale, the original version - Joe Harriott-John Mayer Double Quintet composed - was entitled 'Acka Raga' (a song from 1969 by the Dutch band Shocking Blue) and the theme tune to early editions of BBCtv's family quiz, 'Ask the Family' (1967). Besides its use as the theme tune for the film Kung Pow! Enter The Fist, it appears on the soundtracks of the films Vanilla Sky, Get Carter, and Serendipity, and the television series Alias (episode "The Prophecy") and Spaced. The song "Because I'm Worth It" has also been used as the theme for the Jamie Theakston and Zoë Ball chat show The Priory. The song "Show Me", which first appeared on the 2001 US reissue of the album, is played every Friday by John Richards of KEXP and the song has become known as "The Friday Song". "Show Me" was also used in the National Lampoon film Van Wilder.

=== 2002–2004: Continued success and second album ===
The band released its second album, Dancehall Places, in 2002. The first single from this album, "Sexiest Man in Jamaica", featuring a sample of a Prince Buster song, became their second UK Top 20 hit. As the band embarked on a series of live shows and a UK tour in 2003, a new single was released, "Blue Song," the video for which featured comedians Noel Fielding and Julian Barratt, of The Mighty Boosh fame, as well as Nick Frost of Spaced and Shaun of the Dead fame and Michael Smiley, also of Spaced. The video was directed by Edgar Wright, and was the main inspiration for his 2017 film Baby Driver.

=== 2004–2008: "Singin' in the Rain" and third album ===
Mint Royale returned to the studio to start writing and recording their third album in April 2004. The next few months were a turbulent time for Mint Royale with founding member Chris Baker leaving the band. However, Claxton and the resident vocalists & musicians returned to the studio to complete the recording of the third album in January 2005 and the result was See You In The Morning with the then-unknown Duffy singing on two of the album's songs. In 2005 the group released "Waiting in the Rain" on the Wait for You EP — an extended version of Scanners remix of "Singin' in the Rain", which was featured in the Volkswagen Golf GTI commercial from 2005. It reached number 20 on the UK Singles Chart after it was released as a single (remixed and renamed as "Singing In the Rain"). This version also features on the album See You in the Morning.

In 2007, Mint Royale released a compilation CD+DVD named Pop Is..., which contained all their singles and videos, as well as a couple of the remixes they had done for other performers, and a new song, "Wham-Bar," based on the Wham! hit song "Wham Rap! (Enjoy What You Do)". The same year, Mint Royale released a bonus track remix of Frank Sinatra's "This Town" on the Ocean's Thirteen official soundtrack.

On 1 June 2008, "Singin' in the Rain" re-entered the UK Singles Chart at number 28 after the success of George Sampson on Britain's Got Talent and Jack Chambers on So You Think You Can Dance Australia. It then became number 1 on the UK Chart announced on 8 June 2008.

=== 2013–2016: Later years and hiatus ===
On 10 May 2013, Mint Royale released the GTFU EP on iTunes.

On 31 December 2013, Mint Royale released "Ring", featuring a spoken word sample by Willem Dafoe.

On 9 March 2016, the end of Mint Royale was announced. The final single, "Time", was released on 10 March 2016.

On 21 June 2019, US radio station KEXP played a specially requested extended version from Mint Royale of the song "Show Me" on The Morning Show with John Richards for the station's "Long Songs on the Longest Day of the Year". The song is known for the station as "The Friday Song".

=== 2020–present: Return ===
On 7 February 2020, Mint Royale released a new song entitled "Glitter" with a music video produced by Neil Claxton.

== Discography ==
=== Albums ===
- On the Ropes (1999)
- Dancehall Places (2002) UK #171
- See You in the Morning (2005)

=== Singles ===
Release date	Title	UK Singles Chart	Irish Singles Chart	Album	Format(s)
23 November 1998	"Deadbeat"	—	—	On the Ropes	12"
18 January 1999	"Tequila" by Terrorvision (remix)	2	—	—	CD / 7" / 12"
2 February 1999	"Rock and Roll Bar"	163	—	On the Ropes	CD / 12"
7 June 1999	"From Rusholme with Love"	117	—	On the Ropes	CD / 12"
27 September 1999	"Shake Me"	154	—	On the Ropes	CD / 12"
24 January 2000	"Don't Falter" (feat. Lauren Laverne)	15	—	On the Ropes	CD / 12"
24 April 2000	"Take It Easy"	66	—	On the Ropes	CD / 12"
2001	"Show Me" (feat. Pos)	79	—	—	CD / 12"
26 August 2002	"The Sexiest Man in Jamaica"	20	—	Dancehall Places	CD / 12"
27 January 2003	"Blue Song"	35	—	Dancehall Places	CD / 12"
21 July 2003	"I Don't Know"/"Dancehall Places"	137	—	Dancehall Places	CD / 12"
11 April 2005	"Wait for You"	123	—	See You in the Morning	12"
22 August 2005	"Singin' in the Rain"	20	—	See You in the Morning	CD / 12"
21 November 2005	"The Effect on Me"	219	—	See You in the Morning	CD / 12"
26 May 2008	"Singin' in the Rain" (re-entry)	1	3	See You in the Morning	Digital / CD
10 May 2013	GTFU (EP)	—	—	—	Digital
31 December 2013	"Ring" (feat. Willem Dafoe)	—	—	—	Digital
10 March 2016	"Time"	—	—	—	Digital
7 February 2020	"Glitter"	—	—	—	Digital
