= Dancehall Places =

Studio album by Mint Royale
- Released: 28 October 2002
- Genres: Electronic; trip hop; house; alternative dance
- Length: 47:05
- Labels: Faith & Hope

Mint Royale chronology
On the Ropes (1999)	Dancehall Places (2002)	See You in the Morning (2005)

Professional ratings
Review scores
Source	Rating
The Guardian	3/5 stars

Dancehall Places is the second studio album by English electronic dance music duo Mint Royale, which was released on 28 October 2002 on Faith & Hope.

== Reception ==
BBC's Collective gave solid approval to the album, commenting, "Dancehall Places is filled with 'paaarty toons' which put you in a dancing mood even if they are a bit cheesy." They also noted the greater "depth and intelligence" of the slower songs.

== In popular culture ==
The song "Show Me" was included in the US version of Mint Royale's debut album On the Ropes (1999) and was featured in the National Lampoon produced film Van Wilder (2002), (although it is not included on the official soundtrack). The track samples the song "Sesiya Hamba" from the 1974 musical Ipi Tombi.

The music video for "Blue Song" was directed by Edgar Wright, Wright would use the same concept from the music video for his 2017 film Baby Driver.

== Track listing ==
All songs were written by Chris Baker and Neil Claxton, except where noted.

1. "Blue Song" – 4:16
2. "Sexiest Man in Jamaica" featuring Prince Buster (Baker, Prince Buster, Claxton) – 3:26
3. "Anything" (Baker, Claxton, Paxman, Judie Tzuke) – 4:34
4. "Floor Basics" featuring Gail Hebson – 3:54
5. "Dancehall Places" featuring Damien Jurado (Baker, Claxton, Damien Jurado) – 3:53
6. "Miles and Miles" featuring Gail Hebson – 4:25
7. "Princess" featuring Robbie Roberts and Gail Hebson (Baker, Claxton, Gail Hebson) – 4:28
8. "Show Me" featuring Posdnuos (Baker, Claxton, Bertha Egnos, Gail Lakier) – 4:01
9. "54" (Baker, Claxton, Randy Muller) – 4:39
10. "I Don't Know" featuring Gail Hebson – 5:14
11. "Always Welcome" (Baker, Claxton, Kenneth Gamble, Leon Huff, Murray McLauchlan) – 3:37

== Personnel ==
=== Mint Royale ===
- Neil Claxton – producer, mixing, keyboards, programming
- Chris Baker – producer, keyboards, engineering, bass

=== Other musicians ===
- Laurie Jenkins – drums (1)
- Victor Smalls – percussion (2, 4, 6)
- Steven Wren – vocals (1)
- Prince Buster – vocals (2)
- Pos – raps (8)
- Robbie Roberts – vocals (7)
- Gail Hebson – vocals, backing vocals (4, 7, 10)
- Damien Jurado – vocals, acoustic guitar (5)
- Jez Williams – guitars (5)

=== Other personnel ===
- Steve Dub – mixing
- Greg Fleming – assistant
- Tim Young – mastering
- Tasha Michaels – artwork
- Unit9 – artwork, layout design
