= College Hounds =

1929 film

- Directed by: Zion Myers; Jules White
- Written by: Zion Myers
- Produced by: Zion Myers; Jules White
- Distributed by: Metro-Goldwyn-Mayer
- Release date: September 27, 1929
- Running time: 16' 09"
- Country: United States
- Language: English

College Hounds is a 1929 American comedy short film, released by Metro-Goldwyn-Mayer, structured as a parody of college football films of the silent era, particularly those that feature temptresses who distract players from their obligations, such as 1925's The Plastic Age, 1926's One Minute to Play, starring iconic football celebrity Red Grange, 1927's West Point or 1928's Hold 'Em Yale.

The cast consists of performing dogs whose chewing or barking jaw movements are overdubbed with dialogue, with the football hero main character named "Red Mange". The first of nine black-and-white two-reel Dogville Comedies directed for MGM between 1929 and 1931 by Zion Myers and Jules White, both of whom also wrote, produced and provided voices, the films have been intermittently broadcast on Turner Classic Movies and are available on DVD as part of the Dogville Shorts Collection.

== Plot ==
College Hounds (1930)

Without any musical accompaniment, the MGM lion is seen emitting three roars, followed by a title card listing the film's credits which describe the film as "AN ALL BARKIE". The music during the credits is University of Southern California's 1922 fight song "Fight On".

=== College dormitory room ===
Scene 1: Three dogs share a room in a college dormitory — Red Mange is snoring in a bed with the label "Sold", one dog is studying and Terrier is using wall pulley exercise equipment. Sleeping Red Mange is awakened, shaves using foam and a straight razor and then takes a bath. The exercising Terrier receives a call from a loan shark dog demanding money for a bet on losing horse race. He hangs up and tells his roommates that he is going to the pool room.

=== The pool room ===
Scene 2: Four dogs are standing with front paws leaning on the liquor bar while three other dogs are playing pool. A sign on a lamp states, "Do Not Sit on Tables" and another sign is, "A SCOOP A DAY KEEPS THE WOLF AWAY" and yet another one has, "Try Hamburger sandwich". The terrier tells the gangster that his roommate, Red Mange, will not be playing for Airedale College so Spitz University is a sure bet to win. However, another dog announces that Red Mange will be playing after all.

=== Cleo's room ===
Scene 3: Terrier goes to his daughter Cleo and tells her that Red Mange is coming to see her so she has to pretend illness and keep Red Mange from going to the game. Cleo vamps Red Mange who in his love delirium forgets all about the game. Listening in the closet, Terrier sneezes and the sound brings Red Mange back to his senses, but then Terrier comes out and hits Red Mange on the head with a bottle, knocking him out.

=== The football game ===
Scene 4: The stadium bleachers are filled with an audience of dogs, dressed in various outfits. The play-by-play announcer says that the program is sponsored by manufacturers of No-Scratch Flea Powder. A "DOGVILLE NEWS" cameraman is filming the game while the announcer notes Red Mange's absence. The game starts and the crowd barks its approval. One of the Airedale College players is injured which stops the game so medical personnel can examine the player, while a penalty is assessed against Spitz Univ.

=== Between Cleo's room and the stadium ===
Scene 5: Terrier and Cleo are listening to the game on radio while Red Mange awakens in the closet and demands to be let out. The announcer marks the end of the first half and the coach criticizes the Airedale team for inadequate playing. The Airedale audience provides inspiration by singing the team's fighting song.

"Third quarter." With Airedale still behind and Red Mange still locked in the closet, he knocks down the closet door, runs to the game and says, "Well, here I am coach. I hope I'm not too late." With only minutes left, Red Mange carries the ball for a touchdown and then throws another ball over the goal post, winning the game against Spitz 7 to 6 and is triumphantly carried by his teammates as marching music plays.

== Credits ==
- Directed by Zion Myers and Jules White
