= On the Ropes (album) =

Studio album by Mint Royale
- Released: October 1999
- Length: 52:54
- Labels: Faith & Hope

Mint Royale chronology
On the Ropes (1999)	Dancehall Places (2002)

Professional ratings
Review scores
Source	Rating
AllMusic	3.5/5 stars

On the Ropes is the debut album by British electronic music duo Mint Royale, released in 1999 on the Faith & Hope label.

In June 2001, a new version of the album was published for the U.S. market by MCA Records, featuring a different cover (with a close-up photo of a pinball machine) and a different track list. The two versions of "Shake Me" present in the original album were removed, and three new songs were added: two exclusive songs, as well as "Show Me", which would later appear in Mint Royale's subsequent album Dancehall Places (2002).

== Track listing ==
=== UK version ===
All songs were written by Chris Baker and Neil Claxton, except where noted.

1. "From Rusholme with Love" (Baker, Claxton, John Mayer) – 5:08
2. "Don't Falter" featuring Lauren Laverne (Baker, Claxton, Laverne) – 4:12
3. "Interlude 1" – 0:37
4. "Take It Easy" – 3:49
5. "Because I'm Worth It" – 5:56
6. "Shake Me (Original)" (Baker, Claxton, Kenny Young) – 4:12
7. "Diagonal Girl" – 4:48
8. "Rock and Roll Bar" featuring Julia Baker – 4:35
9. "Space Farm" – 5:28
10. "Deadbeat" (Baker, Claxton, Cocker, Stainton) – 4:52
11. "Lonely Girl" featuring Debbie Newman (Baker, Claxton, Croft) – 4:24
12. "Interlude 2" – 0:43
13. "Shake Me (vocal edit)" (Baker, Claxton, Young) – 4:10

=== US version ===
1. "From Rusholme with Love" – 5:08
2. "Don't Falter" featuring Lauren Laverne – 4:12
3. "Show Me" featuring Pos – 3:43
4. "Interlude 1" – 0:37
5. "Because I'm Worth It" – 5:56
6. "Take It Easy" – 3:49
7. "Kenny's Last Dance" (U.S. exclusive) – 4:13
8. "Trickshot" (U.S. exclusive) – 5:01
9. "Diagonal Girl" – 4:48
10. "Rock and Roll Bar" featuring Julia Baker – 4:19
11. "Space Farm" – 5:28
12. "Deadbeat" – 4:52
13. "Interlude 2" – 0:43
14. "Lonely Girl" – 4:24

== Personnel ==
=== Mint Royale ===
- Neil Claxton – production, keyboards, guitar, brass, organ, programming
- Chris Baker – bass, production

=== Additional musicians ===
- Julia Baker – vocals
- Amul Batra – tabla
- Dave Diamond – guitar
- Gail Hebson – vocals
- Lauren Laverne – vocals
- Debbie Newman – vocals
- Victor Smalls – drums & percussion
- Richard Woolgar – guitar
