= Pop Is... =

Compilation album by Mint Royale
- Released: 19 February 2007
- Genre: Electronic, house, big beat
- Label: Faith & Hope

Mint Royale chronology
See You in the Morning (2005)	Pop Is... (2007)

Pop Is... is a compilation album by Mint Royale, released on 19 February 2007 on Faith & Hope Records. It is a retrospective compilation, including a variety of Mint Royale's works over the past ten years.

NME noted in its review of the album, "Not essential but more worthy of a place in your record collection than, say, contemporary Fatboy Slim is."

== Track listing ==
1. "Don't Falter" (featuring. Lauren Laverne) – 4:15
2. "Singin' in the Rain" (featuring. Gene Kelly) – 3:26
3. "Show Me" (featuring. Pos from De La Soul) – 3:57
4. "Blue Song" – 4:20
5. "Take It Easy" – 5:10
6. "Elephant Stone" (Mint Royale Remix) by the Stone Roses – 3:30
7. "Something New" – 5:05
8. "Sexiest Man in Jamaica" – 4:42
9. "From Rusholme with Love" – 5:08
10. "Kenny's Last Dance" – 5:24
11. "Wait for You" – 4:19
12. "The Effect on Me" – 3:57
13. "Dancehall Places" – 3:52
14. "Wham! Bar" – 3:01

The following songs are included in the iTunes Store version of the album:

1. "Princess (Version 2 Bonus Track)" – 4:17
2. "Trickshot (Bonus Track)" – 5:01
3. "Phlump (Bonus Track)" – 3:31
4. "Don't Falter (Mint Mix Bonus Track)" featuring Lauren Laverne – 5:38
5. "Rest Your Head"
