= So Quiet on the Canine Front =

1930 film

- Directed by: Zion Myers; Jules White
- Written by: Zion Myers
- Produced by: Zion Myers; Jules White
- Distributed by: MGM
- Release date: January 31, 1931
- Running time: 15' 56"
- Country: United States
- Language: English

So Quiet on the Canine Front is a 1931 American comedy short film, released by Metro-Goldwyn-Mayer, structured as a parody of Universal Pictures' All Quiet on the Western Front, a highly praised anti-war tragedy of a young student in the German army during World War I, which won, at the 3rd Academy Awards on November 5, 1930, the top prize — Award for Outstanding Production.

The cast consists of performing dogs whose chewing or barking jaw movements are overdubbed with dialogue. The fifth of nine black-and-white two-reel Dogville Comedies directed for MGM between 1929 and 1931 by Zion Myers and Jules White, both of whom also wrote, produced and provided voices, the film has been intermittently broadcast on Turner Classic Movies and is available on DVD as part of the Dogville Shorts Collection.

== Plot ==
So Quiet on the Canine Front (1931)

As a loud orchestral rendition of "Over There" fills the soundtrack, the MGM lion is seen emitting three silent roars, followed by a title card listing the film's credits.

=== Dog school prologue ===
Scene 1: A class composed of 20 small and medium-sized dogs of various breeds, wearing jackets, shirts and stiff-necked collars, is instructed by a similarly dressed dog "professor" sporting round eyeglasses, with a 1910s bowtie cravat around the neck of his stiff shirt. The subject is anatomy, replete with a dog chart, focusing on "the south end of the backbone — for thereby hangs a tail". One of the "students", a small bulldog, is addressed as Mr. Barker and questioned regarding his disinterest as to the functions of the tail. His response, "please sir, because I haven't any tail", elicits derisive laughter from the dog sitting alongside him and they engage in "sez you, sez me" insults popularized by an earlier hit film set during World War I — the 1926 silent What Price Glory. While the professor restores order by chastising them, "fie, fie, gentlemen! fie, fie!", a dog newspaper vendor is seen shouting out, "all extry! wuxtry! war declared! Airedale Republic declares war on the Kingdom of Dachshund! The professor immediately exhorts his students to volunteer — "it's nice outdoor work and a fine chance to meet some swell French mamas". The laughing dog states, "I'm crazy to go — say, how about you, slacker?" Barker responds, "I'm crazy, too — I'll go". All others also offer to enlist.

=== Camp Poodle – – the Airedale rookie camp ===
Scene 2 intertitle card: "Camp Poodle – – the Airedale rookie camp." A group of uniformed small dogs standing on their hind legs is told by a dog drill sergeant that "if you think this army is going to tolerate any sloppy drilling, you're barking up the wrong tree. Now snap into it and get that hang-dog look off your faces." Continuing to move on their hind lags, the dogs go through a drill routine.

Scene 3: Gathered inside a large military tent, various breeds of dogs, wearing military uniforms and, in some cases, also military hats, are singing chorus-style, "There's a Long Long Trail A-Winding" accompanied by one dog using his paws to hold a harmonica to his muzzle. Another dog is laying out cards for a game of solitaire, still another is rolling dice, and yet another is walking (on his hind legs) sentry duty as the bugler raises a trumpet to his muzzle to sound "Taps". As the melody continues, the canine soldiers, now laying on their army beds, blow out candles or douse them with spittle and go to sleep, making loud human snoring sounds.

=== Entraining for "Over There" ===
Scene 4 intertitle card: "Entraining for "Over There". Various dogs in male and female civilian clothes (suits and long dresses) are at two railroad ticket windows, while a dog orchestra is playing "The Stars and Stripes Forever", with one dog playing tuba, one moving a slide trombone (with a music sheet), one on drum and one (wearing oversized glasses) on the flute. A German Shepherd photographer is taking their picture, with two of the dogs posed behind a cutout of Don Quixote and Sancho Panza archetypes holding World War I-era rifles. Other dogs are saying goodbye to their families, as a mother dog is crying and shouting, "my baby! my baby! They're taking away my baby! I didn't raise my boy to be a sausage!" (correlating the sausage "hot dog" with "I Didn't Raise My Boy to Be a Soldier"). Other dog family members, wives and sweethearts are also howling their goodbyes.

=== So quiet on the canine front ===
Scene 5 intertitle card: "So quiet on the canine front." The dogs are in an underground bunker, some of them standing and others on all fours, enduring the constant shelling. All are wearing uniforms, with upturned metal dog bowls strapped in the manner of helmets upon their heads. They are called out of the trenches and crawl, on all fours, through a battlefield, with shells exploding around them. Arriving at an outpost, they see a machine gun bullet roll of sausages and are told by a commanding officer, "men, we've discovered an improvement on barbed wire entanglement — we will lure the enemy into no man's land with these irresistible wieners — and our machine gunners will do the rest". When an enemy dachshund, wearing a uniform and metal coffeemaker filtering cup as a helmet. runs out of the trenches, on all fours, to eat the wieners, he is sprayed with machine gun fire, but jumps back into the trench unharmed. He later returns and grabs all the wieners which he brings to his side's trenches to share with his fellow soldiers who emit non-English-language sounds as they run on all fours to devour the treats.

=== The same rookies a week later ===
Scene 6 intertitle card: "The same rookies a week later." As shell reverberations continue to shake the bunker, Capt. Growler seeks "a man to fly on enemy headquarters — who will volunteer?" Pvt. Barker is involuntarily chosen when he yelps as a result of a bayonet poke from his laughing rival. He is ordered to "Proceed by airplane to enemy Hdqts. Obtain troop movements. Disguise as enemy nurse." Parachuting into a hayloft, he interrupts a pair of amorous dogs. Infiltrating the other side's command center, he greets, in a falsetto voice, German-accented enemy officers and is told by one of them, "Never have I seen such a beautiful mama". Attempting to leave, Barker snares his "nurse dress" and, as the garment is pulled off, is exposed as a spy and ordered to be executed. Back on the English-speaking side, an officer announces that a charge will be mounted to rescue "our buddy" and shouts, "follow me, men! over the top we go! One dog struggles to fit a gas mask over his muzzle, while cannons blast through the night sky. The dogs run across no man's land while enemy General von Pretzel orders the execution to proceed. Barker's "sez you" compatriot throws a "flea grenade" at enemy dogs who launch into a frenzy of scratching. Von Pretzel laughs derisively, telling Barker, "you'll die like a dog" and orders the use of "limburger bomb" version of poison gas, but the weapon suddenly explodes causing him to collapse while emitting blubbering sounds. Spotting his former laughing rival, Barker says, "my pal — you saved my life", as another limburger bomb explosion envelops them in noxious fumes.

== Credits ==
- Directed by Zion Myers and Jules White
