= Dogville Comedies =

Series of short films

From 1929 to 1931, Metro-Goldwyn-Mayer produced a series of nine short films called Dogville Comedies, sometimes referenced as "barkies" (in a parody of "talkies", the first three films used "AN ALL BARKIE" in the opening credits). The actors in these films were trained dogs dressed to parody performers in contemporary films. The dogs' "dialogue" was dubbed by actors and voice artists, including Pete Smith.

The films were directed by Zion Myers and conceived and co-directed by Jules White. Myers and White later worked on The Three Stooges comedies.

== Series titles ==
College Hounds

1929

- College Hounds: a parody of college football films, such as 1926 films MGM's Brown of Harvard and FBO's One Minute to Play which stars celebrated sports idol of the 1920s and 1930s Red Grange (the main character in College Hounds is called "Red Mange")
- Hot Dog: a parody of courtroom dramas, such as MGM's Madame X, released shortly before Hot Dog where the main character is named "Clara Bone" per "It girl" Clara Bow

1930

- Who Killed Rover? a/k/a The Dogville Murder Case: a parody of Philo Vance whodunits (here "Phido Vance"), such as Paramount's The Canary Murder Case (1929)
- The Dogway Melody: a parody of talking, singing and dancing early musicals, specifically MGM's The Broadway Melody (1929)
- The Big Dog House: a parody of prison films, specifically MGM's The Big House (1930)

1931

- So Quiet on the Canine Front: a parody of World War I films, specifically Universal's All Quiet on the Western Front (1930)
- Love-Tails of Morocco: a parody of French Foreign Legion films, such as Paramount's Morocco (1930)
- The Two Barks Brothers: a parody of films with brothers on opposite sides of the law, specifically MGM's Gentleman's Fate (1931)
- Trader Hound: a parody of African jungle adventure films, specifically MGM's Trader Horn (1931)

== Home video ==
The complete series of Dogville Comedies has been released on DVD by Warner Bros. as part of its Warner Archive Collection.
