= See You in the Morning (album) =

Studio album by Mint Royale
- Released: 14 August 2005
- Genre: Big beat
- Length: 53:03
- Label: Faith & Hope

Mint Royale chronology
Dancehall Places (2002)	See You in the Morning (2005)	Pop Is... (2007)

Singles from See You in the Morning
- 1. "Wait for You" Released: 2005; 2. "Singin' in the Rain" Released: 2005; 3. "The Effect on Me" Released: 2005

Professional ratings
Review scores
Source	Rating
AllMusic	3.5/5 stars

See You in the Morning is the third studio album by Mint Royale. It was released on the Faith & Hope label in 2005. It peaked at number 26 on the UK Independent Albums Chart.

== Track listing ==
No.	Title	Length
1.	"Wait for You"	4:21
2.	"The Effect on Me"	3:58
3.	"Something New"	5:03
4.	"Little Words"	4:41
5.	"Singin' in the Rain"	2:46
6.	"Harpy"	5:04
7.	"I Don't Care"	5:02
8.	"My Heart Is Beating Fast"	4:12
9.	"See You in the Morning"	4:56
10.	"World"	5:47
11.	"Rest Your Head"	4:07

== Charts ==
Chart	Peak position
UK Independent Albums (OCC)	26
