= The Dogway Melody =

1930 film

- Directed by: Zion Myers; Jules White
- Written by: Zion Myers
- Produced by: Zion Myers; Jules White
- Starring: Zion Myers; Jules White
- Production company: Metro-Goldwyn-Mayer
- Distributed by: Metro-Goldwyn-Mayer
- Release date: December 20, 1930
- Running time: 17 minutes
- Country: United States
- Language: English

The Dogway Melody is a 1930 comedy short film that recreates scenes from early musical films, particularly The Broadway Melody. The entire cast is trained dogs with human voiceovers. It was directed by Zion Myers and Jules White and it forms part of the MGM-produced series of Dogville Comedies.

This film is an extra feature in The Broadway Melody Special Edition DVD released in 2005, as well as the restored Warner Archive Blu-Ray of The Broadway Melody.

== Plot ==
The Dogway Melody (1930)

The series of short films has an all-dog cast (with human voiceovers) that recreates famous scenes from early musical films, particularly The Broadway Melody. The finale is a chorus line of dogs performing "Singin' in the Rain" spoofing Cliff Edwards' original version of the song in The Hollywood Revue of 1929. Also spoofed is Al Jolson's performance of "Mammy" in The Jazz Singer. This was a part of MGM's popular series of Dogville Comedies shorts directed by Zion Myers and Jules White.

== Cast ==
- Zion Myers - (voice) (uncredited)
- Jules White - (voice) (uncredited)
