= Alkaline Trio discography =

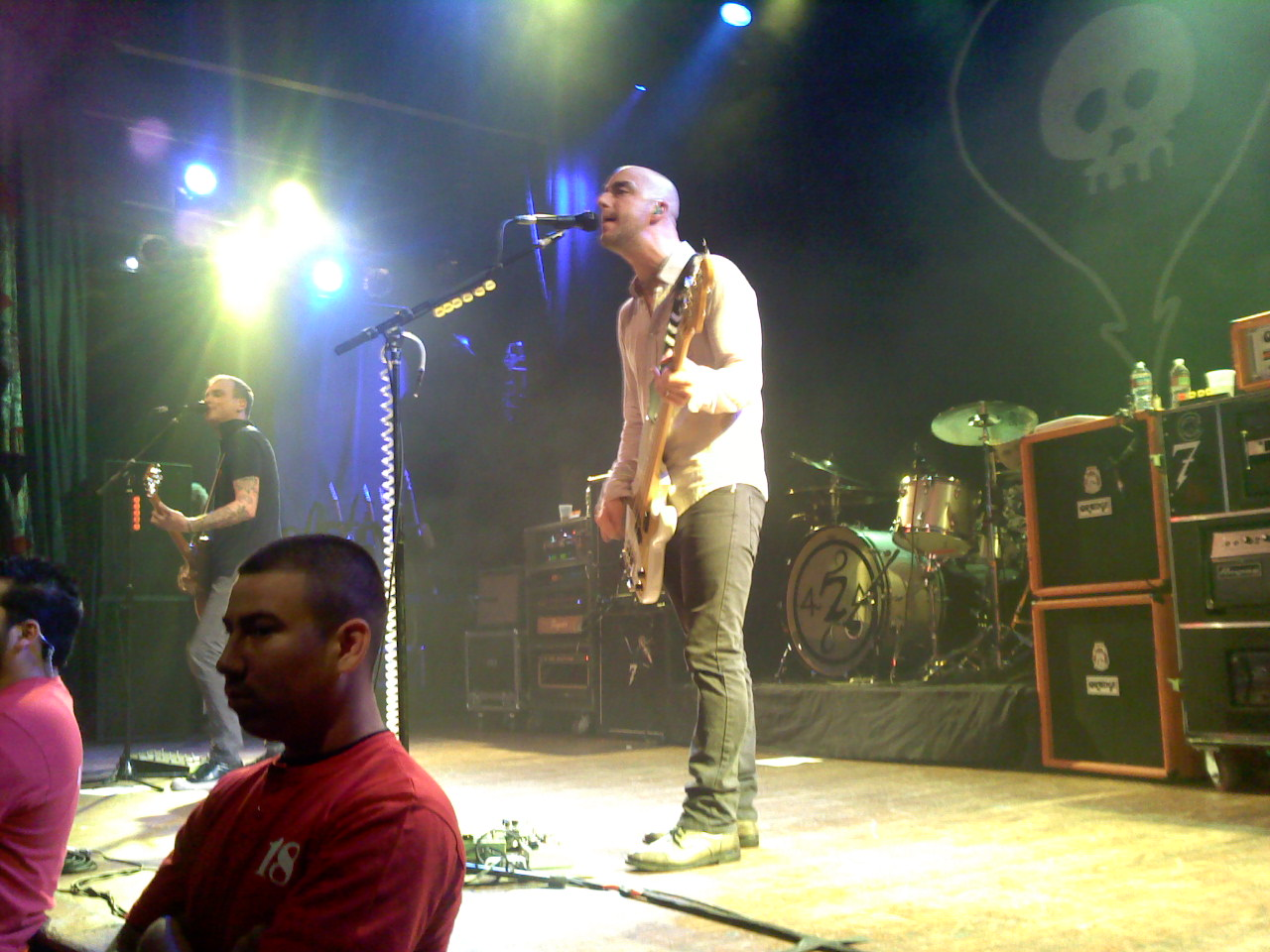
- Alkaline Trio performing at the House of Blues in Hollywood in support of This Addiction
- Studio albums: 10
- Extended plays: 3
- Compilation albums: 3
- Singles: 16
- Video albums: 1
- Music videos: 13
- Split albums: 1
- Demos: 2
- Digital releases: 9
- Other appearances: 19

The discography of Alkaline Trio, a Chicago-based punk rock band, consists of ten studio albums, three compilation albums, one split album, four EPs, one video album, sixteen singles, one demo, nine digital releases, and thirteen music videos. Alkaline Trio formed in 1996 with an initial lineup of Matt Skiba (guitar, lead vocals), Rob Doran (bass), and Glenn Porter (drums). This lineup released the band's demo tape and the 1997 single "Sundials" on Chicago record label Johann's Face Records, after which Doran left the band and was replaced by Dan Andriano. The group then signed to Asian Man Records and released their debut EP For Your Lungs Only and album Goddamnit in 1998. A second EP, I Lied My Face Off, followed in 1999 and resulted in their first music video, for the song "Goodbye Forever". In 2000 Asian Man released the band's second album, Maybe I'll Catch Fire, as well as the compilation album Alkaline Trio, collecting most of their previously released early material. Porter then left and was replaced by Mike Felumlee.

The band next moved to Vagrant Records, releasing From Here to Infirmary in 2001. It was their first album to reach the Billboard charts, reaching number 199 on the Billboard 200 and #9 amongst independent albums. Its two singles, "Stupid Kid" and "Private Eye", both charted on the UK Singles Chart. Felumlee then left and Derek Grant became the band's new permanent drummer. A split EP with Hot Water Music was released in 2002 through Jade Tree. The band's fourth album, Good Mourning, was released in 2003 on Vagrant, reaching number 1 on Billboard's Top Independent Albums chart and #20 on the Billboard 200. "We've Had Enough" and "All on Black" were released as singles from this album, the former becoming the band's first song to chart in the United States. A DVD titled Halloween at the Metro was released later that year as an installment of Kung Fu Films' The Show Must Go Off! series. In 2004 the band participated in the BYO Split Series by releasing a split album with One Man Army.

Alkaline Trio's fifth album, Crimson, was released in 2005 through Vagrant. It did not fare as well on the charts as Good Mourning, though its three singles, "Time to Waste", "Mercy Me", and "Burn", became the band's highest-charting singles in the United Kingdom. In 2007 Vagrant released Remains, a compilation album of B-sides, compilation and EP tracks, and live material. Alkaline Trio then moved to major label Epic Records for 2008's Agony & Irony, which charted higher on the Billboard charts than any of their previous releases. It also spawned their highest-charting single in "Help Me", which reached number 14 on Modern Rock Tracks. 2010's This Addiction was released through the band's newly formed label Heart & Skull, in partnership with Epitaph Records. It became the highest-charting album of their career, reaching number 11 on the Billboard 200 and number 1 on the Rock, Independent, and Alternative Albums charts. Damnesia, followed in 2011, consisting of "semi-unplugged" versions of songs from their past releases as well as three new tracks. The band's eighth studio album, My Shame Is True, was released on April 2, 2013. Alkaline Trio is releasing their ninth studio album, Is This Thing Cursed?, on August 31, 2018, through Epitaph and Heart & Skull. The first single for it, "Blackbird", was released on July 19, 2018. To date, the band has sold more than one million albums.

== Albums ==
=== Studio albums ===
Title	Details	Peak chart positions								Sales	Certifications
Title	Details	US	US Alt.	US Indie	US Rock	AUS	SCO	UK	UK Rock	Sales	Certifications
Goddamnit	Released: October 13, 1998; Label: Asian Man; Formats: CD, LP	—	—	—	—	—	—	—	—		
Maybe I'll Catch Fire	Released: March 14, 2000; Label: Asian Man; Formats: CD, LP	—	—	—	—	—	—	—	—		
From Here to Infirmary	Released: April 3, 2001; Label: Vagrant; Formats: CD, LP	199	—	9	—	—	—	95	—	US: 175,000	
Good Mourning	Released: May 13, 2003; Label: Vagrant; Formats: CD, LP	20	—	1	—	—	30	32	—	US: 258,000	
Crimson	Released: May 24, 2005; Label: Vagrant; Formats: CD, LP	25	—	—	—	—	—	34	—	US: 204,000	BPI: Silver
Agony & Irony	Released: July 1, 2008; Label: Epic; Formats: CD, LP	13	4	—	5	95	45	52	—	US: 57,000	
This Addiction	Released: February 23, 2010; Label: Heart & Skull / Epitaph; Formats: CD, LP	11	1	1	1	94	54	51	2		
My Shame Is True	Released: April 2, 2013; Label: Heart & Skull / Epitaph; Formats: CD, LP	24	6	7	8	—	52	51	4		
Is This Thing Cursed?	Released: August 31, 2018; Label: Heart & Skull / Epitaph; Formats: CD, LP	68	5	4	6	—	26	50	2		
Blood, Hair, and Eyeballs	Released: January 26, 2024; Label: Rise; Formats: CD, LP, DL	188	22	33	—	— (Note: Blood, Hair, and Eyeballs did not enter the ARIA Albums Chart, but peaked at number 13 on the ARIA Vinyl Albums Chart.)	11	64	3		
"—" denotes a recording that did not chart or was not released in that territory.

=== Compilation albums ===
Year	Album details	Peak chart positions	
Year	Album details	US	UK
2000	Alkaline Trio: Released: April 18, 2000; Label: Asian Man; Format: CD, LP	—	—
2007	Remains: Released: January 30, 2007; Label: Vagrant; Format: CD, LP	64	68
2011	Damnesia: Released: July 12, 2011; Label: Heart & Skull / Epitaph; Format: LP, CD	43	—
2018	Past Live Boxset: Released: June, 2018; Label: Epitaph; Format: LP	—	—
"—" denotes releases that did not chart.

=== Split albums ===
Year	Album details	Peak chart positions	
Year	Album details	US Ind.	US Heat.
2002	Alkaline Trio / Hot Water Music: Released: January 22, 2002; Label: Jade Tree; Format: CD	36	45
2004	BYO Split Series Volume V: Released: April 20, 2004; Label: BYO; Format: LP, CD	13	—
2026	Alkaline Trio / Rise Against	—	—

=== Video albums ===
Year	Video details
2003	Halloween at the Metro: Released: August 5, 2003; Label: Kung Fu; Formats: DVD
2018	Past Live: Released: April 30, 2018; Formats: Blu-Ray, LP

=== Demos ===
Year	Album details	Tracks
1996	Demo tape^{[I]}: Released: 1996; Label: none; Format: CS	1. "Weak Week"; 2. "Nose Over Tail"; 3. "Ninety-Seven"; 4. "Sundials"

I All four tracks from the demo tape were reissued on the 2008 re-release of Goddamnit.

== Extended plays ==
Year	EP details
1998	For Your Lungs Only: Released: May 26, 1998; Label: Asian Man; Format: CD, 7" EP
1999	I Lied My Face Off: Released: July 20, 1999; Label: Asian Man; Format: CD, 12" EP
2013	Broken Wing: Released: April 2, 2013; Label: Heart & Skull / Epitaph; Format: 12" EP
2020	E.P.: Released: March 19, 2020; Label: Epitaph; Format: 7" EP, digital

== Singles ==
List of singles, with selected chart positions and certifications, showing year released and album name
Year	Title	Peak chart positions						Album
Year	Title	US Alt.	EU	SCO	UK	UK Indie	UK Rock	Album
1997	"Sundials"	—	—	—	—	—	—	Non-album single
2000	"Bye Bye Love"	—	—	—	—	—	—	Alkaline Trio / Blue Meanies
2001	"Stupid Kid"	—	—	49	53	6	—	From Here to Infirmary
2001	"Private Eye"	—	—	53	50	10	—	From Here to Infirmary
2001	"Hell Yes"	—	—	—	—	46	—	Non-album singles
2002	"Halloween"	—	—	—	—	—	—	Non-album singles
2003	"We've Had Enough"	38	—	49	50	—	—	Good Mourning
2003	"All on Black"	—	—	66	60	—	9	Good Mourning
2005	"Time to Waste"	40	97	—	32	5	—	Crimson
2005	"Mercy Me"	—	89	29	30	3	—	Crimson
2006	"Burn"	—	—	32	34	3	—	Crimson
2007	"Off My Mind"	—	—	—	—	—	—	Alkaline Trio / Smoking Popes
2008	"Help Me"	14	—	—	—	—	—	Agony & Irony
2008	"Over and Out"	—	—	—	—	—	—	Agony & Irony
2010	"This Addiction"	—	—	—	—	—	40	This Addiction
2010	"The American Scream"	—	—	—	—	—	—	This Addiction
2013	"I Wanna Be a Warhol"	—	—	—	—	—	—	My Shame Is True
2018	"Blackbird"	—	—	—	—	—	—	Is This Thing Cursed?
2023	"Bad Time"	—	—	—	—	—	—	Blood, Hair, and Eyeballs
2025	"Oblivion"	—	—	—	—	—	—	Non-album singles
2025	"Bleeding Out"	—	—	—	—	—	—	Non-album singles
2025	"Surprise Surprise"	—	—	—	—	—	—	Non-album singles
"—" denotes releases that did not chart. "n/a" denotes singles that are not from albums.

== Digital releases ==
The following Alkaline Trio recordings have been released exclusively as digital downloads.
Year	Title	Notes
2005	Acoustic in London^{[I]}	Live acoustic performance recorded May 11, 2005, at Madam Jo-Jo's in London.
2005	Red Amendment^{[I]}	Demo recordings from the Crimson sessions.
2006	Live at the Vic Theater^{[I]}	Live concert performance recorded in 2000 at The Vic Theatre in Chicago.
2006	12.04.99 Green Bay, WI^{[I]}	Live concert performance recorded December 4, 1999, at the Concert Café in Green Bay, Wisconsin.
2006	Occult Boots Vol. 1^{[I]}	Live concert performance recorded April 14, 2006, in Philadelphia on the "Occult Roots" tour.
2007	Scraps	Compilation of B-sides, remixes, and live tracks. Released as a companion disc to Remains.
2007	Live at Reading...^{[I]}	Live concert performance recorded August 8, 2003, at the Reading Festival.
2009	Agony & Irony Demos^{[I]}	Demo recordings from the Agony & Irony sessions.
2009	The Myspace Transmissions	Live acoustic performance recorded January 13, 2009, for The Myspace Transmissions.

I Denotes Blood Pact exclusive releases.

== Other appearances ==
List of non-single guest appearances, showing year released and album name
Title	Year	Album
"97"^{[I]}	1997	Marc's a Dick and Gar's a Drunk: The Johann's Face Story
"The Exploding Boy"^{[I]} (originally performed by The Cure)	1999	Pocket Bomb
"My Friend Peter"^{[I]}	2000	Magnetic Curses
"Crawl" (demo)	2000	Another Year on the Streets
"Bloodied Up" (demo)	2000	Another Year on the Streets
"Snake Oil Tanker" (acoustic)	2000	A Very Milky Christmas
"Dead End Road"^{[II]}	2001	Living Tomorrow Today: A Benefit for Ty Cambra
"The Metro"^{[II]} (originally performed by Berlin)	2001	Another Year on the Streets Volume 2
"Jaked on Green Beers"^{[II]}	2002	Atticus: ...Dragging the Lake
"Old School Reasons"^{[II]}	2003	Oil: Chicago Punk Refined
"Over at the Frankenstein Place"^{[III]} (originally from The Rocky Horror Picture Show)	2003	The Rocky Horror Punk Rock Show
"Warbrain"^{[II]}	2004	Rock Against Bush, Vol. 1
"Heaven"^{[III]} (originally performed by The Psychedelic Furs)	2004	Another Year on the Streets, Vol. 3
"Fine Without You" (Carmen Rizzo/Jed Smith Indian Summer remix)^{[III]}	2005	Cursed Original Motion Picture Soundtrack
"Lucretia My Reflection" (originally performed by The Sisters of Mercy)	2005	The Suicide Girls: Black Heart Retrospective
"Wash Away" (originally performed by T.S.O.L.)	2005	Tony Hawk's American Wasteland soundtrack
"Burn" (Alleged remix)^{[III]}	2006	Underworld: Evolution: Original Motion Picture Soundtrack
"Fire Down Below"	2007	Warped Tour 2007 Tour Compilation
"Over and Out" (Renholder remix)	2009	Underworld: Rise of the Lycans: Original Motion Picture Soundtrack
"Movin' Right Along" (originally performed by Kermit the Frog and Fozzie Bear)	2011	Muppets: The Green Album

I Denotes songs that were re-released on Alkaline Trio.

II Denotes songs that were re-released on Remains.

III Denotes songs that were re-released on Scraps.

== Music videos ==
Year	Song	Director	Album
1999	"Goodbye Forever"	Adam Levin, Matt Bettinelli-Olpin	I Lied My Face Off
2001	"Stupid Kid"	Matthew Barry, Maureen Egan	From Here to Infirmary
2001	"Private Eye"		From Here to Infirmary
2003	"We've Had Enough"	Tomorrow's Brightest Minds	Good Mourning
2004	"Sadie"		BYO Split Series Volume V
2005	"Time to Waste"	Joseph Hahn	Crimson
2005	"Mercy Me"	Ben Goldman	Crimson
2006	"Burn"	Piper Ferguson	Crimson
2007	"Warbrain"	Josh Stern	Remains
2008	"Help Me"	Josh Forbes	Agony & Irony
2010	"This Addiction"	Matthew Stawski	This Addiction
2011	"Clavicle"		Damnesia
2013	"I, Pessimist"		My Shame Is True
2013	"I Wanna Be a Warhol"	Rob Soucy	My Shame Is True
2023	"Blood, Hair, and Eyeballs"	Ravi Dhar	Blood, Hair, and Eyeballs
2023	"Bad Time"	Ravi Dhar	Blood, Hair, and Eyeballs
2024	"Break"	Claire Marie Vogel	Blood, Hair, and Eyeballs
