= Damnesia =

Compilation album by Alkaline Trio
- Released: July 12, 2011
- Genre: Punk rock, acoustic rock
- Length: 50:03
- Label: Heart & Skull / Epitaph
- Producer: Cameron Webb

Alkaline Trio chronology
This Addiction (2010)	Damnesia (2011)	Broken Wing (2013)

Damnesia is an album by the punk rock band Alkaline Trio, released July 12, 2011 through their label Heart & Skull, a joint venture with Epitaph Records. A primarily acoustic album, it consists of "a selection of beloved fan favorites selected from the group's extensive catalogue and presented in an intimate semi-unplugged format". The album also includes two new songs, "Olde English 800" and "I Remember a Rooftop", as well as a cover version of the Violent Femmes' "I Held Her in My Arms". A music video consisting of studio footage was released for the song "Clavicle", and the band has embarked a fifteenth-anniversary United States tour in support of the album.

== Reception ==
Professional ratings
Review scores
Source	Rating
AbsolutePunk	7.5/10
AllMusic	3/5 stars
Big Cheese	4/5
Blare Magazine	3/5 stars
Melodic	2.5/5 stars

Damnesia was released to mostly positive reviews. AbsolutePunk gave it a rating of 7.5/10, stating that "Damnesia satiates the appetite fans have for new material, while proving that an old band can still do new tricks.". Big Cheese gave it a rating of 8/10, stating that the album took a "mellower approach" than the band's previous effort. However, Allmusic gave it 3/5, whilst Blare Magazine also gave it the same score, saying that "there’s the odd inclusion where those old breakup lyrics, slowed down to unplugged-tempo, don’t have the same ring".

== Track listing ==
No.	Title	Writer(s)	Length
1.	"Calling All Skeletons" (from Agony & Irony, 2008)	Matt Skiba, Dan Andriano, Derek Grant	3:31
2.	"Nose Over Tail" (from Goddamnit, 1998)	Skiba, Rob Doran, Glenn Porter	2:41
3.	"This Could Be Love" (from Good Mourning, 2003)	Skiba, Andriano, Grant	4:26
4.	"Every Thug Needs a Lady" (from Good Mourning, 2003)	Skiba, Andriano, Grant	3:42
5.	"Clavicle" (from Goddamnit, 1998)	Skiba, Andriano, Porter	2:38
6.	"Mercy Me" (from Crimson, 2005)	Skiba, Andriano, Grant	3:02
7.	"The American Scream" (from This Addiction, 2010)	Skiba, Andriano, Grant	3:15
8.	"We've Had Enough" (from Good Mourning, 2003)	Skiba, Andriano, Grant	2:48
9.	"Olde English 800" (original)	Skiba, Andriano, Grant	1:37
10.	"I Held Her in My Arms" (Violent Femmes cover)	Gordon Gano	2:43
11.	"Blue in the Face" (from Good Mourning, 2003)	Skiba, Andriano, Grant	3:40
12.	"I Remember a Rooftop" (original)	Skiba, Andriano, Grant	3:38
13.	"Private Eye" (from From Here to Infirmary, 2001)	Skiba, Andriano, Mike Felumlee	3:47
14.	"You've Got So Far to Go" (from Maybe I'll Catch Fire, 2000)	Skiba, Andriano, Porter	3:12
15.	"Radio" (from Maybe I'll Catch Fire, 2000)	Skiba, Andriano, Porter	5:23
Total length:			50:03

== Personnel ==
- Matt Skiba – guitar, vocals
- Dan Andriano – bass, vocals
- Derek Grant – drums, vocals
