= This Addiction =

Studio album by Alkaline Trio
- Released: February 23, 2010
- Recorded: 2009
- Studios: Atlas, Chicago
- Genre: Punk rock
- Length: 34:30
- Labels: Heart & Skull, Epitaph
- Producers: Alkaline Trio, Matt Allison

Alkaline Trio chronology
Agony & Irony (2008)	This Addiction (2010)	Damnesia (2011)

Singles from This Addiction
- 1. "This Addiction" Released: January 12, 2010; 2. "The American Scream" Released: June 29, 2010

This Addiction is the seventh studio album by Chicago-based rock band Alkaline Trio, released February 23, 2010 as the first release by their newly formed record label Heart & Skull, a joint venture with Epitaph Records. Described as a return to the band's punk rock roots, it was recorded at Atlas Studios in their hometown of Chicago with Matt Allison, the same location and producer used for much of their early material. The album draws lyrical inspiration from the band members' personal lives, addressing themes such as love, addiction, death, divorce, grief, suicide, politics, and war. It became the highest-charting album of the band's career, debuting on the Billboard 200 at number 11 and also reaching number 1 on the Rock, Independent, and Alternative Albums charts.

== Formation of Heart & Skull ==
Following the touring cycle for their 2008 album Agony & Irony, Alkaline Trio left Epic Records due to personnel changes within the record label. Singer and guitarist Matt Skiba explained in a May 2009 interview with Billboard that "Everyone who signed us to Epic, all of the people we trusted there, were let go. And that's not to say the people running it now aren't cool, we just don't know them and we don't like to work generally with people we don't know. We had a bunch of material and wanted to do a record sooner [rather] than later, so we called them and asked them if we could leave and they said, 'Yeah, that’s cool.'" Rather than signing a recording contract with another label, the band decided to release their next album themselves, a move Skiba explained as partially inspired by the independent releases of Nine Inch Nails' Ghosts I–IV and The Slip and Radiohead's In Rainbows:

With the way that everything is being done, with people like Trent Reznor and Radiohead, it was very inspiring to us that when you're doing things on your own you can do whatever you want. Not that we're going to give records away but this time we're starting a label, we want to build it up first and have the freedom to release exclusive things whenever we want. That's something we've always been able to do until we were on Epic, so it's nice that we're able to do that again.

In November 2009 Alkaline Trio announced the formation of their own independent record label, created as a joint venture with Epitaph Records in a manner similar to ANTI- and Hellcat Records. Epitaph had previously released Patent Pending, the 2006 album by Skiba's side project Heavens. Named Heart & Skull after Alkaline Trio's logo, the new label would be inaugurated by the release of their new album. Skiba remarked that "We made the decision to form Heart & Skull to put out our own records after having been through every kind of label deal in the industry, big indies, small indies, majors. We knew it was time to adapt to the shifting tides of the music industry and we could not be more thrilled about doing that in conjunction with the team at Epitaph." Singer and bassist Dan Andriano added: "For our band at this time it really makes sense to release our own records, but we wanted to make sure we could partner up with good people who we would want to share in something very special to us. When Brett [Gurewitz] called and said he wanted to be involved, that was it. Epitaph is a label I've admired and supported for more than half of my life."

== Background and recording ==
During their Spring 2009 tour, Alkaline Trio tested new songs including "Dine, Dine My Darling" (a title derived from the Misfits' "Die, Die My Darling"), "Dead on the Floor", and "This Addiction". Skiba explained that "we used our soundcheck basically as pre-production" and stated that the band would choose the ten best songs and "record them lickety-split in July". Reflecting a desire to return to their punk rock roots, the band chose to record at Atlas Studios in their hometown of Chicago, where they had recorded much of their early material including their first two albums, 1998's Goddamnit and 2000's Maybe I'll Catch Fire. They also chose to record with Matt Allison, producer of both of those albums as well as 2001's From Here to Infirmary and much of their other early material. "Matt has a really great ear and some really great ideas, so he engineered the record and co-produced it", said Skiba. "The official production credit is ours though. We went in with a very strict idea of what we wanted to do."

During the Summer and Fall of 2009 both Skiba and Andriano worked on solo projects: Skiba recorded a solo album entitled Demos for the band's early label Asian Man Records, which was originally scheduled for a February 2010 release but was pushed back until after the release of the new Alkaline Trio album. Meanwhile, Andriano performed and recorded as a solo project titled The Emergency Room. That October Alkaline Trio played the Riot Fest, an annual Chicago punk rock festival, alongside older Chicago bands including Screeching Weasel, Pegboy, and Naked Raygun. Skiba noted that reconnecting with these and other friends in the Chicago music scene allowed their punk rock influences to seep into the new Alkaline Trio album even more.

On December 1, 2009 the album's title was announced as This Addiction, which is also the title of its opening track. Of the eleven tracks selected for the album, eight were written by Skiba and three by Andriano ("Dine, Dine My Darling", "Off the Map", and "Fine"). Skiba explained that both members came up with an equal number of songs during the writing process, but that "it was pretty easy to pick out the ones we wanted to use. There are three of us that have equal say in the creative process, so you gotta leave your ego at the door. Dan and I are best friends and we're not competitive with each other at all. We're partners and we try [to] do everything for the better[ment] of the band and for the better[ment] of the record."

== Style ==
Dare I say it's a punk rock record. We've made a progression, but we've also gone back to our roots. There's definitely some old-sounding Alkaline Trio vibe to this record. A lot of the songs were written really quick. We added a few bells and whistles here and there, but it's pretty stripped-down, straight-up rock 'n' roll.
— Matt Skiba describing the musical style of This Addiction.

Prior to recording This Addiction, Skiba expressed a desire to return to the band's punk rock roots: "That's how we started as a band, and over the years I think we evolved into kind of more of a rock band with punk roots." Elaborating on the album's sound in a November 2009 interview, he called it "a rock record but our punk rock upbringing definitely shines through, more so than our last few records. The vibe is similar to our humble beginnings. It's a step forward but I also think it has glimmers of our past in it." He also described the album as more straightforward, with a "less is more" approach that included reducing the number of guitar overdubs, with many of the songs including only one guitar track: "We wanted a record that we could easily play live. For the most part, it's pretty bare bones while still sounding full and big." The album does, however, include some synthesizer as well as a trumpet solo in the style of Neutral Milk Hotel.

Musically, Skiba has cited the influence of fellow Chicago punk bands Screeching Weasel, Pegboy, and Naked Raygun on This Addiction's sound. He has also cited the influence of the Ramones and Social Distortion, saying of the latter that "They've never put out a bad album, in my opinion. I remember being like 'Wow, this sounds like old Social D' [during recording]. It's got that melodic yet melancholic kind of mean guitar lead. It sort of reminds me of Mommy's Little Monster and some of the older stuff and like how psyched I was to hear that."

== Themes ==
The anger is back. Not that we're angry people, but there are a bunch of different themes. All of us have been through some pretty life-changing experiences since [2008's Agony & Irony]. Friends dying; people getting divorced; things that really are rather jolting but can also be very inspiring. I think we've used those experiences as inspiration. I certainly have.
— Skiba on the album's themes and inspirations.

Lyrically, the themes of This Addiction were heavily influenced by the band members' personal lives. Skiba remarked that "The whole record is really personal, all three of us have been through quite a bit since our last album and it is all expressed through this, all the songs are about the relationships we've been in and so the record has a constant theme." He cited this as another way in which the album recalls the band's earlier material:

Another thing that makes it resemble our earlier records, especially our first record, is that it's really personal. A couple of us have gone through some pretty serious life changes. We had a good friend of ours pass away since the last record. There's a song on the record, "Dorothy", that was really influenced by the film Blue Velvet but it's a metaphor for someone and something else. Everything on the record is stuff that definitely hits close to home for us and we tried to communicate that in the songs.

Discussing other specific songs on the album, Skiba mentioned that the title track uses heroin and methadone addiction as a metaphor for love, stating that "It's a human condition that I think we all, in one way or another, fall victim to. It's not to say that people can't be happy or find bliss in a relationship. It's just amazing to me how unhappy most people are and they can't shake it and can't fix it, much like an addiction." He also discussed the politically themed "The American Scream", a song inspired by the suicide of a United States Army soldier after his return from the War in Afghanistan: "For a long time we were afraid to write overtly political songs but I read this article about a US soldier that came back from a tour of duty in Afghanistan and blew his head off on his mother's grave and I wrote a song about that." He has described the lyrical style of This Addiction as "thinking-man's punk": "We wanted to do something that's fun but also interesting and lyrically, something that will be fun for people to read along to and hopefully understand."

== Promotion and release ==
On December 30, 2009, the album's track listing and artwork were posted online. The lead single, "This Addiction", was made available for listening as streaming audio through a dedicated website on January 5, 2010, using a marketing technique in which listeners were required to post an advertisement about the album to Facebook or Twitter in order to access the song. It became available as a download through digital retailers on January 12, and was released as a 7" single exclusively at Hot Topic stores on February 9. "This Addition" impacted radio on February 2. The song's music video premiered February 8. Alkaline Trio went on a US with Cursive, with support from the Dear & Departed, to promote the album. On February 18 This Addiction was made available for listening as streaming audio through the band's MySpace profile. This Addiction was released February 22, 2010 in the United Kingdom through Heart & Skull and Hassle Records, and the following day in North America through Heart & Skull and Epitaph Records. It was released in several versions, including a standard eleven-track compact disc and digital download, a limited Deluxe Edition with six bonus tracks and a full-length concert DVD recorded at the House of Blues in Las Vegas, Nevada in 2008, and a gatefold LP. On March 10, 2010, the band appeared on Late Show with David Letterman. In May and June 2010, the band went on a UK tour. "The American Scream" impacted radio on June 29, 2010. Following this, the band performed on the Warped Tour and performed at the Reading and Leeds Festivals in the UK.

== Sales and reception ==
Professional ratings
Review scores
Source	Rating
AbsolutePunk	67%
AllMusic	3.5/5 stars
Alternative Press	3.5/5 stars
IGN	7.9/10
Melodic	2.5/5 stars
Punknews.org	4/5 stars
Rock Lifestyle	3.5/5
Rock Sound	8/10
Rolling Stone	3/5 stars
Spin	3.5/5 stars

This Addiction became the highest-charting album of Alkaline Trio's career, debuting on the Billboard 200 at #11 and reaching #1 on the Rock, Independent, and Alternative Albums charts. It was also #51 on the UK Albums Chart.

Critics' reviews of This Addiction have generally complimented the album's production and Dan Andriano's contributions, while criticizing Matt Skiba's vocals and lyrical themes. Both Drew Beringer of AbsolutePunk and Scott Heisel of Alternative Press noted that the production effectively blends hints of the band's early sound with the more polished rock style of their later years, with Beringer remarking that it "captures the vibe of the album nicely" and Heisel commenting that it "still sounds like a slick, polished Alkaline Trio album, mainly because the band have evolved to a point where they want their sound to come off as slick and polished." Both praised Andriano's writing and singing, with Beringer noting that he "only leads on three tracks, but sounds fantastic in each, especially in album closer, 'Fine'." Heisel stated that "His three cuts (including the spectacular "Off the Map") are sufficiently poppy without being dumbed down." Skiba's vocals received more criticism: Beringer stated that "some of [his] weakest material shows up here" and that he "sounds awesome on the title track and 'The American Scream', [but] falls flat on blunders like 'Draculina' and 'Piss and Vinegar.'" Heisel criticised Skiba for "[falling] back too frequently on his well-worn lyrical themes of drugs (the title track) and death ('The American Scream'). It's moments like these where it feels like he's trying too hard to keep up appearances with his band's more fairweather fans." Corey Apar of Allmusic felt similarly, saying that "it would have been nice to hear [Andriano] more, especially since Skiba's lyrics leave much to be desired." Michael French of Punknews.org shared this sentiment, saying that Skiba's lyrics "aren't necessarily bad, but they've been significantly dumbed down; Matt once turned cliché into clever and cunning commentary--now they just lack personality and the clichés are just, well...cliché."

Opinions were divided on the band's use of trumpet in "Lead Poisoning" and synthesizer in "Draculina" and "Eating Me Alive". Rob Hope of Rock Lifestyle said of these elements that "At first you may jump back and scratch your head, but after a few listens you realize it's pulled off well and is quite likeable." Beringer remarked that the horns "fill the background nicely", while Heisel felt that "The goofy, NOFX-esque trumpet solo [...] turns a decent song into a throwaway track". Similarly, Beringer felt that the use of synthesizers in "Eating Me Alive" "puts a little glam into the band's gothic style", while Heisel called them "awful", stating that they "completely ruin" the song, and that "Draculina" should have been left off of the album and relegated to a B-side: "seriously, the sooner this band stop playing around with keyboards, the better off we'll be". Both had praise for specific songs on the album, however: Beringer called "The American Scream" "the ideal Trio song; it's totally dynamic and enthralling, and should be a quick fan favorite." Heisel said that Andriano's "Dine, Dine My Darling" "is exactly what makes the Trio a compelling punk band–it's loaded with a huge hook, honest lyrics and a wink to their forefathers". He singled out "Dead on the Floor" as the album's finest track, calling it "a not-too-distant musical cousin from Goddamnit's 'San Francisco', with some of Skiba's most heartbroken lyrics." Jon Dolan of Rolling Stone remarked on the band's return to their "bleak-Blink-182 roots" after the "power-ballad overreach" of Agony & Irony.

Final opinions on the album were mixed. Hope called it "an easy listen with the same soothing vocals and clean cut sing-a-long choruses we've grown to love. Overall a great offering but not overly addictive." Beringer praised the band's growth in musicianship in the years since From Here to Infirmary, but also commented that This Addiction "could be polarizing to fans, splitting them into three groups: fans who love the album because it goes back to the band's roots, fans who dislike this album because they may think it's a cheap imitation of older days, and the fans who might think this is a step backwards from the previous album." Heisel concluded that "while This Addiction might not be perfect, it's a more than respectable entry into the band's already sizeable canon, proving that though they may be in that rarified group of punk-rock lifers, Alkaline Trio aren't done evolving yet." Apar stated that although the album was purported to be a return to the early sound of Goddamnit, he found it more comparable to From Here to Infirmary "since the end result is still the same polished album full of vaguely gothic and bloody references where characters like Draculina live -- no real bitterness, sore-throat defiance, or endearing heartache to be found." Though complimenting "This Addiction" and "Off the Map" as strong songs, he felt that the album failed to live up to its expectations as a return to roots: "Alkaline Trio just can't seem to recapture the spirit of their early days, when purpose and emotion fueled every note. Instead, one is left with totally competent -- and at times, yes, catchy -- songs that ring just a bit too hollow compared to the urgent leave-it-all-on-the-floor guts of those earliest releases [...] despite the polished and punchy singalong choruses, This Addiction is really just more of the same recycled melodies from the Trio rather than any sort of rebirth." Andrew Kelham of Rock Sound agreed that the album did not succeed in recapturing the band's early sound, but was a strong effort nonetheless: "Alkaline Trio aren't naïve punk rockers from the Chicago suburbs anymore, as a result this album fails to recapture that innocence but succeeds in creating another strong body of work that the group can be proud of." Mikael Wood of Spin remarked that the "cozier confines" of an independent label "appear to have put the band at ease" and that their "hooky, blood-soaked bad-love allegories [...] satisfy like heartburn-inducing comfort food." French concluded that "This Addiction isn't so much a 'return to form,' but rather a summary--a sonic scrapbook of sorts that carefully documents their entire career, from sour home Chicago to the dressing rooms of Late Night with Conan O'Brien."

== Track listing ==
All tracks are written by Matt Skiba, Dan Andriano, and Derek Grant.

No.	Title	Length
1.	"This Addiction"	2:35
2.	"Dine, Dine My Darling"	2:58
3.	"Lead Poisoning"	2:37
4.	"Dead on the Floor"	4:20
5.	"The American Scream"	3:00
6.	"Off the Map"	3:16
7.	"Draculina"	3:34
8.	"Eating Me Alive"	2:53
9.	"Piss and Vinegar"	2:28
10.	"Dorothy"	3:32
11.	"Fine"	3:17
Total length:		34:30

=== Bonus tracks ===
All tracks are written by Matt Skiba, Dan Andriano, and Derek Grant, except where noted.

Deluxe edition
No.	Title	Length
12.	"Kick Rocks"	2:45
13.	"Those Lungs"	3:49
14.	"This Addiction" (acoustic)	2:37
15.	"Dine, Dine My Darling" (acoustic)	3:00
16.	"Dead on the Floor" (acoustic)	4:08
17.	"Fine" (acoustic)	3:13
Total length:		54:02

iTunes edition & Japanese edition
No.	Title	Writer(s)	Length
12.	"Two Lips, Two Lungs and One Tongue" (originally performed by Nomeansno)	Rob Wright, John Wright, Andy Kerr	1:52
Total length:			36:15

Deluxe Edition DVD: Live at the House of Blues Las Vegas, July 25, 2008
No.	Title	Writer(s)	Length
1.	"Calling All Skeletons"
2.	"Nose Over Tail"	Skiba, Rob Doran, Glenn Porter
3.	"I Lied My Face Off"	Skiba, Andriano, Porter
4.	"I Found Away"
5.	"In Vein"
6.	"Private Eye"	Skiba, Andriano, Mike Felumlee
7.	"Mercy Me"
8.	"Warbrain"
9.	"Blue Carolina"
10.	"Time to Waste"
11.	"Armageddon"	Skiba, Andriano, Felumlee
12.	"Love Love, Kiss Kiss"
13.	"Goodbye Forever"	Skiba, Andriano, Porter
14.	"My Little Needle"	Skiba, Andriano, Porter
15.	"Crawl"	Skiba, Andriano, Felumlee
16.	"Help Me"
17.	"My Friend Peter"	Skiba, Andriano, Porter
18.	"This Could Be Love"

== Personnel ==
Alkaline Trio

- Matt Skiba – guitar, vocals
- Dan Andriano – bass, vocals
- Derek Grant – drums

Additional musicians

- Jason Flaks – trumpet
- Ruth Rosenburg – saxophone

Production

- Matt Allison – recording engineer, co-producer, mix engineer
- Ted Jensen – mastering
- Cameron Webb – recording engineer of acoustic bonus tracks

Artwork

- Dan Field – cover photography
- John Yates – design and layout
- Derek Grant – design of "7" logo (refined by Mark Penxa)
- Matthew Reeves and Tyler Curtis – band photography

== Charts ==
Chart performance
Chart (2010)	Peak position
Australian Albums (ARIA)	94
Canadian Albums (Nielsen SoundScan)	68
Scottish Albums (Official Charts)	54
UK Albums (Official Charts)	51
UK Independent Albums (Official Charts)	3
UK Rock & Metal Albums (Official Charts)	2
US Billboard 200	11
US Independent Albums (Billboard)	1
US Indie Store Album Sales (Billboard)	5
US Top Alternative Albums (Billboard)	1
US Top Rock Albums (Billboard)	1
