= Remains (Alkaline Trio album) =

Compilation album by Alkaline Trio
- Released: January 31, 2007
- Recorded: 2000–2006
- Genres: Punk rock, pop punk, emo
- Length: 69:38
- Label: Vagrant
- Producers: Matt Allison, Alkaline Trio, Jerry Finn

Alkaline Trio chronology
Crimson (2005)	Remains (2007)	Agony & Irony (2008)

Scraps Companion CD

Remains is a 2007 compilation album by American punk band Alkaline Trio, collecting B-sides, rarities, and unreleased tracks from 2000 to 2006. It is their second such compilation, following Alkaline Trio, which collected tracks from 1996 to 1999.

== Contents ==
The album is a collection of 22 tracks that the band has recorded for various compilations, EPs, B-sides and international releases. The disc also includes three new live tracks from a 2006 concert at Avalon in Los Angeles. Vocalist/guitarist, Matt Skiba describes the collection as "an unintentional sort of bookend for our career thus far." A DVD that includes 45 minutes of material, including all the band's videos from From Here to Infirmary, Good Mourning, and Crimson, accompanies the disc. Included is exclusive B-roll and behind-the-scenes footage from the band's live shows.

== Release and reception ==
Professional ratings
Review scores
Source	Rating
AbsolutePunk.net	79%
Allmusic	4.5/5 stars
Aversion	3/5 stars
Daily Dischord	4.5/5 stars
Drowned in Sound	(7/10)
LAS Magazine	(8.8/10)
PopMatters	(7/10)
RebelPunk	5/5 stars
Rocklouder	4/5 stars
Sputnikmusic	4/5 stars

On November 6, 2006, Remains was announced for release. The band explained: "...in the midst of the torrent of recording albums and touring to support them -- we will book into a studio and record some more... These truly are the remains of the last half-decade." On December 31, the band posted an e-card, which contained "We Can Never Break Up" and "Hell Yes" available for streaming. It was released on January 31, 2007, through Vagrant. On February 6, a music video was released for "Warbrain". The video includes live footage of the band from a New Year's Eve show. The album peaked at #64 on Billboard 200. By August 2008, the album sold 60,000 copies. A vinyl repressing of the album was released through Newbury Comics on February 3, 2023, and was limited to 500 copies.

== Track listing ==
No.	Title	Original release	Length
1.	"Hell Yes"	Hell Yes EP (2001)	3:49
2.	"My Standard Break from Life"	Hell Yes EP; Plea for Peace compilation (2000)	2:34
3.	"Dead End Road"	Living Tomorrow Today: A Benefit for Ty Cambra (2001)	3:08
4.	"Metro" (Berlin cover)	"Stupid Kid" single (2001); Another Year on the Streets Vol. 2 compilation (2001)	3:41
5.	"Jaked on Green Beers"	Atticus: ...dragging the lake (2002)	3:27
6.	"Queen of Pain"	Alkaline Trio/Hot Water Music Split CD (2002)	3:56
7.	"While You're Waiting"	Alkaline Trio/Hot Water Music Split CD	4:06
8.	"Rooftops" (Hot Water Music cover)	Alkaline Trio/Hot Water Music Split CD	2:15
9.	"Old School Reasons"	Oil compilation (2003)	2:51
10.	"Warbrain"	Rock Against Bush, Vol. 1 (2004)	2:28
11.	"Fine Without You"	BYO Split Series Volume V (2004)	3:15
12.	"Hating Every Minute"	BYO Split Series Volume V	3:03
13.	"Dead and Broken"	BYO Split Series Volume V	2:09
14.	"Sadie"	BYO Split Series Volume V	4:38
15.	"If You Had a Bad Time"	BYO Split Series Volume V	3:38
16.	"Wait for the Blackout" (The Damned cover)	BYO Split Series Volume V	3:28
17.	"We Can Never Break Up"	"Time to Waste" single (2005)	3:10
18.	"Don't Say You Won't"	"Time to Waste" single	2:21
19.	"Buried"	"Mercy Me" single (2005)	3:16
20.	"Dethbed" (Live)	previously unreleased	3:12
21.	"My Standard Break from Life" (Live acoustic)	previously unreleased	2:42
22.	"I'm Dying Tomorrow" (Live)	previously unreleased	2:31

== Scraps companion album ==
On Valentine's Day 2007, the band posted a bulletin on their MySpace giving a downloadable template and cipher. When printed and aligned correctly with the booklet in the Remains album, the template gave a user name and a password. When the cipher was deciphered, it gave a web address to go to. This website contained a downloadable album and cover file. The cipher and template accessible to Blood Pact members was different from those of the general public.

MySpace Scraps Tracks

1. "Private Eye" (Acoustic) - 3:38
2. "Crawl" (Acoustic) - 4:23
3. "This Could Be Love" (Acoustic) - 4:15
4. "Cringe" (Live) - 2:24
5. "You've Got So Far to Go" (Live) - 2:58
6. "Mr. Chainsaw" (Live) - 3:37
7. "She Took Him to the Lake" (Live) - 2:32
8. "Crawl" (BBC) - 4:27
9. "Heaven" (BBC) - 3:35
10. "Over at the Frankenstein Place" - 2:32
  Total - 34:18

Blood Pact Scraps Tracks

1. "Fine Without You" (Remix)
2. "Burn" (Alleged Remix)
3. "Prevent This Tragedy" (Live)
4. "Warbrain" (Demo)
