= Sadie (Alkaline Trio song) =

Song by Alkaline Trio
- Released: April 20, 2004
- Studio: Atlas Studios, Chicago, Illinois (Original); Conway, Hollywood, California (Crimson)
- Genre: Punk rock; emo
- Label: BYO; Vagrant
- Songwriters: Matt Skiba; Dan Andriano; Derek Grant
- Producer: Jerry Finn

"Sadie" is a song by American rock band, Alkaline Trio. The song was initially released on April 20, 2004, as part of band's split album with One Man Army, and is notable for being included on multiple major releases throughout their discography. The song was written by Matt Skiba, Dan Andriano, and Derek Grant.

== Background ==
"Sadie" was written by Skiba while the band was on tour in support of their 2003 album, Good Mourning. It was initially played only at sound checks for their shows, but the diversity in sound that it had to their previous songs grew fondly with the band, which led them to record it for BYO Split Series Volume V. At the same time however, all three members knew that "Sadie" was the tone they wanted to set for their next album, and intended to re-record it for their 2005 album, Crimson.

"The feel of the song was different, so we were just trying to go for something. A blaring sort of rock and roll guitar in the beginning wouldn't have really been appropriate. We wanted something that was dirty and dark, but not too dark to where it was dull-sounding. We messed around with it for quite a while, and then when we went in to do Crimson, we sort of emulated that tone as best we could without completely trying to just redo the way it was done originally." - Matt Skiba

The song was written about Susan Atkins; a member of the Manson Family involved in all but one of the nine murders the family committed in California in the 1960s. Atkins was nicknamed Sadie Mae Glutz (or Sexy Sadie) by Charles Manson, which is where the song's name came from. Skiba wrote it as a more sympathetic look at Atkins and her involvement with the Manson Family, seeing her more as a victim of manipulation. During the bridge of the song, a section of Atkins' testimony is read by Heather Gabel, who designed the band's Heart & Skull logo. The song also features the band's touring manager/guitarist, Nolan McGuire, on lead guitar.

== Release and reception ==
"Sadie" originally released as part of BYO Split Series Volume V, but the band would go on to rerecord the song for Crimson. The original version of the song was also included in the band's compilation album, Remains.

In 2016, Grant uploaded a music video for the song to his personal YouTube channel. The video shows the band playing the original version of the song in their old practice space in 2004. Grant also noted that the video was originally released with the song, but that "it eventually disappeared back into the vault where it remained until now." While McGuire's guitar parts can be heard, he is not present in the video.

Over the years, "Sadie" has become one of Alkaline Trio's most discussed songs, with many critics praising both its instrumentals and lyrics. Alternative Press included it in their list of songs based on true crime stories, praising it for how the band "pull off some interesting flourishes with the song by using spoken lyrics, offering Atkins’ words throughout the track." Maria Sherman of BuzzFeed called the song "ridiculously catchy" while discussing Crimson as a whole.

== Personnel ==
Personnel per Crimson booklet.

Alkaline Trio

- Matt Skiba – guitars, lead vocals, songwriting
- Dan Andriano – bass, backing vocals, songwriting
- Derek Grant – drums, backing vocals, songwriting

Additional musicians

- Nolan McGuire – lead guitar
- Heather Hannoura – spoken word
