= Prevent This Tragedy =

Song by Alkaline Trio
- Released: May 24, 2005
- Studio: Conway, Los Angeles, California
- Genre: Emo; punk rock
- Length: 3:06
- Label: Vagrant
- Songwriters: Matt Skiba; Dan Andriano; Derek Grant
- Producer: Jerry Finn

"Prevent This Tragedy" is a song by American rock band, Alkaline Trio, released on their 2005 album, Crimson. The song was written by Matt Skiba, Dan Andriano, and Derek Grant.

== Background ==
"Prevent This Tragedy" was written about the West Memphis Three; a group of teenagers convicted of murdering three children in 1993. The case became highly controversial due to all three juveniles being found guilty with what the general public believed to be a severe lack of evidence against them.

Many members of the music community showed their support over the years to have the West Memphis Three released from prison. Alkaline Trio in particular became heavily involved with a yearly awareness day for the three, while guitarist, Matt Skiba, corresponded with Damien Echols, the only one of the three men who had been sentenced to death row, in an effort to save his life. Skiba also stated that they had also been a major influence on not only writing Crimson, but the majority of the band's activities for over a decade.

"That was something that we, and myself in particular, were driven and influenced by. Especially Damien’s situation, because he was facing the death sentence. He was on his third and last appeal, and then they were going to kill him. It was a personal statement about someone who was facing imminent death as a young person.” - Matt Skiba

== Reception ==
Critics have praised "Prevent This Tragedy" for helping to spread awareness for the case of the West Memphis Three. Mala Mortensa of Alternative Press praised the song's narrative, and noted how much more emotional it is now that all three men have been released from prison, but have yet to be fully exonerated.

== Personnel ==
Personnel per Crimson booklet.

Alkaline Trio

- Matt Skiba – guitars, lead vocals, songwriting
- Dan Andriano – bass, backing vocals, songwriting
- Derek Grant – drums, backing vocals, songwriting

Additional musicians

- Warren Fitzgerald – additional string arrangements
