= Alkaline Trio / Smoking Popes =

Single by Alkaline Trio and Smoking Popes
- Released: January 1, 2007
- Genre: Punk rock
- Songwriters: Matt Skiba; Dan Andriano; Derek Grant; Josh Caterer; Eli Caterer; Matt Caterer

Alkaline Trio singles chronology
"Burn" (2006)	"Alkaline Trio / Smoking Popes" (2007)	"Help Me" (2008)

Smoking Popes singles chronology
"Before I'm Gone" (1997)	"Alkaline Trio / Smoking Popes" (2007)

Alkaline Trio / Smoking Popes is a split single by the Chicago-based rock bands Alkaline Trio and Smoking Popes. It was distributed to attendees at a New Year's Eve performance by both bands at the Metro Chicago on December 31, 2006 – January 1, 2007. The single features each band covering one of the other's songs, with Alkaline Trio covering the Smoking Popes' "Off My Mind" (from Get Fired) and the Smoking Popes covering Alkaline Trio's "Blue Carolina" (from Good Mourning).

The two bands announced the concert and split single in November 2006. Both bands had frequently played sold-out shows at the Metro. The Smoking Popes had recorded two live albums at the venue, 2000's Live and 2006's At Metro. Alkaline Trio had filmed a live concert DVD there, 2003's Halloween at the Metro, at which they distributed their "Halloween" single, featuring two Misfits covers, to attendees. It had quickly become a sought-after collector's item, and the band took a similar approach to their split with the Smoking Popes. Following the performance, Alkaline Trio posted their cover of "Off My Mind" for download on their MySpace profile on January 2, 2007, stating "Hopefully, this will alleviate the want to shell out hundreds of dollars for a copy on eBay." The Smoking Popes soon followed suit, posting their cover of "Blue Carolina" as streaming audio on their MySpace profile on January 6.

== Track listing ==
Side A: Alkaline Trio
No.	Title	Writer(s)	Length
1.	"Off My Mind" (originally performed by the Smoking Popes)	Josh Caterer, Eli Caterer, Matt Caterer

Side B: Smoking Popes
No.	Title	Writer(s)	Length
1.	"Blue Carolina" (originally performed by Alkaline Trio)	Matt Skiba, Dan Andriano, Derek Grant

== Personnel ==
=== Alkaline Trio ===
- Matt Skiba – guitar, lead vocals
- Dan Andriano – bass, backing vocals
- Derek Grant – drums

=== Smoking Popes ===
- Josh Caterer – lead guitar, lead vocals
- Eli Caterer – rhythm guitar, backing vocals
- Matt Caterer – bass, backing vocals
- Ryan Chavez – drums
