= Blackbird (Alkaline Trio song) =

Single by Alkaline Trio

from the album Is This Thing Cursed?
- Released: July 19, 2018
- Studio: The Lair, Culver City, California
- Genre: Punk rock; pop punk
- Length: 3:20
- Label: Epitaph
- Songwriters: Matt Skiba; Dan Andriano; Derek Grant

Alkaline Trio singles chronology
"She Lied To The FBI" (2013)	"Blackbird" (2018)	"Is This Thing Cursed?" (2018)

"Blackbird" is a song by American rock band Alkaline Trio. It was released on July 19, 2018, as the first single from their album, Is This Thing Cursed? (2018). The song was written by Matt Skiba, Dan Andriano, and Derek Grant.

== Background ==
Much of the band's activities had been put on hold since their 2013 album, My Shame Is True, which had primarily been due to Skiba becoming lead guitarist and vocalist for Blink-182. When the members reconvened however, "Blackbird" was the first song they wrote together. Andriano had initially composed the song's music, and had written politically-inspired lyrics for it. However, these lyrics were scrapped when he sent the music to Skiba, who rewrote the lyrics about a "lady friend of mine".

"There were just a lot of parallels with someone who I felt was a great love of my life and probably always will be. But I wrote it for her. The end." - Matt Skiba

The name of the song comes from the film, Public Enemies, in which John Dillinger refers to his love interest, Billie Frechette as his "blackbird". Additionally, a song of the same name is also featured in the film.

== Release and reception ==
"Blackbird" was released alongside the announcement of Is This Thing Cursed? on July 19, 2018.

The song was met with mainly positive reviews. Israel Daramola of Spin praised the song's melodies, calling it "a glossy, pristine pop-punk record that's anthemic and a bit catchy in its breezy melodies". Billboard's Connor Whittum called the song "fast paced" and "guitar heavy". Ian Winwood of Kerrang! praised the lyrics, calling them "haunting, but as usual, there is a dark sense of humour at work here, too". Ryan Wyness of PunkNews compared it to the band's 2003 album, Good Mourning, feeling that it shared "the same dark, macabre aura".

== Personnel ==
Alkaline Trio

- Matt Skiba – guitar, lead vocals, songwriting
- Dan Andriano – bass, backing vocals, songwriting
- Derek Grant – drums, songwriting

Production

- Cameron Webb – production, mixing
