= Hell Yes =

Hell Yes may refer to:

- "Hell Yes" (Alkaline Trio song), a 2001 song by Alkaline Trio
- "Hell Yes" (Beck song), a 2005 song by Beck from the album Guero
- Hell Yes (EP), a 2005 EP by Beck
