= Help Me (Alkaline Trio song) =

- The single's cover art was inspired by the artwork of Joy Division's "Love Will Tear Us Apart"

Single by Alkaline Trio

from the album Agony & Irony
- Released: April 22, 2008
- Recorded: 2008
- Studio: Pulse Recording, Silver Lake, Los Angeles, California; Retrophonics, St. Augustine, Florida
- Genre: Pop punk
- Length: 3:44
- Label: Epic
- Songwriters: Matt Skiba; Dan Andriano; Derek Grant
- Producer: Josh Abraham

Alkaline Trio singles chronology
"Off My Mind" (2007)	"Help Me" (2008)	"Love Love, Kiss Kiss" (2008)

"Help Me" is a song by the Chicago-based punk rock band Alkaline Trio, released as the first single from their 2008 album Agony & Irony. The song impacted radio on April 22, 2008. It became the highest-charting single of the band's career, reaching #14 on Billboard's Modern Rock Tracks chart. The B-side of the single is a cover version of Tegan and Sara's "Wake Up Exhausted", recorded with Jim Devito at Retrophonics Studio in St. Augustine, Florida in a separate session from Agony & Irony.

== Lyrics and cover art ==
The lyrics of "Help Me" were inspired by Anton Corbijn's 2007 film Control, a biopic of Joy Division singer Ian Curtis. The single's cover art was inspired by Peter Saville's artwork for Joy Division's 1980 single "Love Will Tear Us Apart", a song that Alkaline Trio singer and guitarist Matt Skiba covered in November 2008 with his side project Heavens. He explained that Joy Division were a major influence on the writing of "Help Me":

I've always been a big Joy Division fan and I was quite touched by the film. I thought it captured Joy Division and Ian Curtis' life beautifully. The sincerity of their music combined with their imagery and art is like nothing else. Everything about them was artistic and unique. Our artwork and song is a tribute to a melancholic beauty that can never be replicated.

== Music video ==
The music video for "Help Me", directed by Josh Forbes, depicts the band in a steampunk setting driving a locomotive through the Southwestern United States. Singer/bassist Dan Andriano notices another locomotive approaching on a collision course, driven by a villain and with a damsel in distress (played by Kat Von D) tied to its pilot. Drummer Derek Grant pilots a monowheel device to activate a railroad switch, causing the two locomotives to run parallel. The battle takes to the sky as Skiba rescues the damsel with the aid of a jet pack while the villain's locomotive becomes an airplane and the band's becomes an airship emblazoned with their logo. Skiba evades the villain by flying through a narrow opening in a canyon wall which the villain's aircraft crashes into. The video makes heavy use of computer-generated imagery and is interspersed with footage depicting the band performing the song on a rooftop.

== Track listing ==
Side A
No.	Title	Writer(s)	Length
1.	"Help Me"	Matt Skiba, Dan Andriano, Derek Grant	3:45

Side B
No.	Title	Writer(s)	Length
1.	"Wake Up Exhausted" (originally performed by Tegan and Sara)	Sara Quin, Tegan Quin	3:08
Total length:			6:53

== Personnel ==
=== Band ===
- Matt Skiba – guitar, lead vocals
- Dan Andriano – bass, backing vocals
- Derek Grant – drums

=== Production ===
- Josh Abraham – producer on "Help Me"
- Ryan Williams – engineer on "Help Me"
- Ted Jensen – mastering on "Help Me"
- Jim Devito – engineer on "Wake Up Exhausted"
