= Is This Thing Cursed? =

Studio album by Alkaline Trio
- Released: August 31, 2018
- Recorded: April 2018
- Studios: The Lair, Culver City, California
- Genre: Punk rock
- Length: 39:48
- Label: Epitaph
- Producer: Cameron Webb

Alkaline Trio chronology
My Shame Is True (2013)	Is This Thing Cursed? (2018)	E.P. (2020)

Singles from Is This Thing Cursed?
- 1. "Blackbird" Released: July 19, 2018; 2. "Is This Thing Cursed?" Released: August 7, 2018; 3. "Demon and Division" Released: August 28, 2018

Is This Thing Cursed? is the ninth studio album by American punk rock band Alkaline Trio, released on August 31, 2018, on Epitaph Records. Produced and mixed by Cameron Webb, the album was announced alongside the release of the lead single, "Blackbird".

It is their first release since 2013's My Shame Is True. It is their final album to be released on Epitaph.

== Writing and composition ==
Vocalist and bassist Dan Andriano compared the recording process to that of the band's early days: "the songwriting process is almost like what it was back in the day. We would just kind of write a song, be excited about it, then move on. We wrote in that spirit in the studio. I really feel like we made a record that the old school fans are going to dig." The band also compared Is This Thing Cursed? to their second album, Maybe I'll Catch Fire (2000).

Themes and topics covered on the album include depression, the 2016 presidential election, the Access Hollywood tape, the band's hometown of Chicago, and the Fyre Festival that vocalist and guitarist Matt Skiba was set to headline with Blink-182, but cancelled.

== Reception ==
Professional ratings
Aggregate scores
Source	Rating
AnyDecentMusic?	7.3/10
Metacritic	75/100
Review scores
Source	Rating
AllMusic	3.5/5 stars
Clash	8/10
Drowned in Sound	8/10
Exclaim!	8/10

The album has received generally positive reviews. AllMusic wrote "Recapturing the spirit of earlier recordings, Chicago punk stalwarts Alkaline Trio polish those rough edges of youthful messiness and hit an effortless stride with their ninth album. At its boisterous best, Cursed soars with the trademark harmonies of Matt Skiba and Dan Andriano, popping with an energy that recalls past peaks like 2000's Maybe I'll Catch Fire and 2001's From Here to Infirmary." Kerrang! gave the band a glowing review writing "Despite having become effectively a part-time concern and thus an outfit whose status remains steadfastly cult, at the very least Alkaline Trio can take a (grim) pride in having returned and reclaimed the title of Punk Rock Connoisseurs’ Band Of Choice with criminal ease here. As ever, on Is This Thing Cursed?, their music comes in any colour you like, so long as it’s black."

== Track listing ==
Taken from Apple Music.

No.	Title	Length
1.	"Is This Thing Cursed?"	2:43
2.	"Blackbird"	3:20
3.	"Demon and Division"	3:16
4.	"Little Help?"	2:23
5.	"I Can't Believe"	4:01
6.	"Sweet Vampires"	3:23
7.	"Pale Blue Ribbon"	2:00
8.	"Goodbye Fire Island"	3:31
9.	"Stay"	3:29
10.	"Heart Attacks"	2:20
11.	"Worn So Thin"	2:35
12.	"Throw Me to the Lions"	3:18
13.	"Krystalline"	3:29
Total length:		39:48

== Personnel ==
Alkaline Trio

- Matt Skiba – guitar, vocals
- Dan Andriano – bass, vocals
- Derek Grant – drums, vocals

Production

- Cameron Webb – production, mixing

== Charts ==
Chart (2018)	Peak position
Australia (ARIA Hitseekers)	4
Scottish Albums (Official Charts)	26
UK Albums (Official Charts)	50
US Billboard 200	68
US Top Rock Albums (Billboard)	6
