= Hell Yes (Alkaline Trio song) =

Single by Alkaline Trio
- A-side: "Hell Yes"
- B-side: "My Standard Break from Life"
- Released: 2001
- Recorded: 2000 at Pachyderm Studio, Cannon Falls, Minnesota
- Genre: Punk rock
- Length: 6:44
- Label: Lookout!
- Songwriter(s): Matt Skiba, Dan Andriano, Mike Felumlee
- Producer(s): Matt Allison, Alkaline Trio

Alkaline Trio singles chronology
"Alkaline Trio / Blue Meanies" (2000)	"Hell Yes" (2001)	"Private Eye" (2001)

"Hell Yes" is a song by the Chicago-based punk rock band Alkaline Trio, released as a single in 2001 through Lookout! Records. Both tracks of the single, "Hell Yes" and "My Standard Break from Life", were recorded in 2000 at Pachyderm Studio in Cannon Falls, Minnesota during sessions for the band's 2001 album From Here to Infirmary. The single was the band's final release to include drummer Mike Felumlee, who left the group shortly after From Here to Infirmary's release. Both tracks were reissued in 2007 on the compilation album Remains.

== Background ==
Singer and guitarist Matt Skiba wrote "Hell Yes" in tribute to Anton LaVey, founder and High Priest of the Church of Satan. It was written shortly after Skiba moved to the San Francisco Bay Area where LaVey had once lived. In the liner notes for Remains, Skiba commented that "I miss the Bay, and Doktor LaVey and The Black House on the hill that has since gone away." Singer and bassist Dan Andriano cited "Hell Yes" as one of his favorite songs to perform and noted it as one of the most often-requested numbers at the band's performances, describing it as "a perfect punk rock song about doing what makes you happy. Plain and simple."

"My Standard Break from Life" was written by Andriano in the span of roughly twenty minutes during a time when he was living on Chicago's north side next to a crack house. Describing his inspiration, he stated "Let's just say I was pretty depressed. I was totally unmotivated, drinking way too much, smoking way too much, and the ladies weren't exactly banging down my door. But, somehow the song is pretty fun to play." Though infrequently performed as a group, Andriano occasionally plays the song solo at the band's shows.

== Track listing ==
All tracks are written by Matt Skiba, Dan Andriano, and Mike Felumlee

Side A
No.	Title	Length
1.	"Hell Yes"	3:50

Side B
No.	Title	Length
1.	"My Standard Break from Life"	2:54
Total length:		6:44

== Personnel ==
=== Band ===
- Matt Skiba – guitar, lead vocals
- Dan Andriano – bass, lead vocals
- Mike Felumlee – drums

=== Production ===
- Matt Allison – producer, mix engineer
- Neil Weir – assistant producer
