= All on Black =

Single by Alkaline Trio

from the album Good Mourning
- Released: December 2, 2003
- Recorded: 2002–2003 at Cello Studios
- Genre: Punk rock
- Length: 12:15
- Label: Vagrant
- Songwriters: Matt Skiba, Dan Andriano, Derek Grant
- Producers: Joe McGrath, Jerry Finn

Alkaline Trio singles chronology
| "We've Had Enough" (2003) | "All on Black" (2003) | "Time to Waste" (2005) |

"All on Black" is a song by the Chicago-based punk rock band Alkaline Trio, released as the second single from their 2003 album Good Mourning. The single was released only in the United Kingdom, with acoustic versions of "All on Black" and "We've Had Enough" recorded live for the Student Broadcast Network as B-sides, and reached #60 on the UK Singles Chart.

A music video for the song was planned, which was to feature Marilyn Manson as the devil in a purgatory-themed casino gambling against singer/guitarist Matt Skiba. However, the video was never filmed as Manson pulled out of the project. Commenting on the concept, Skiba remarked:

It sounds a bit cheesy, but the script was great and the set was going to be awesome, totally like Dario Argento-esque, just really creepy. We were going to have angels and all kinds of weird shit, really carnival like and trippy [...] we had the place rented and everything and just needed Manson, but he bailed and we kind of asked ourselves whom else could we get for the role and we kind of decided who could replace Manson. We were just so disappointed we were just like fuck it.

== Track listing ==
All tracks are written by Matt Skiba, Dan Andriano, and Derek Grant.

| No. | Title | Length |
|---|---|---|
| 1. | "All on Black" | 4:00 |
| 2. | "This Could Be Love" (live acoustic SBN session) | 4:03 |
| 3. | "All on Black" (live acoustic SBN session) | 4:12 |
| Total length: | | 12:15 |

- The data portion of the enhanced CD consists of the music video for "We've Had Enough".

== Personnel ==
=== Band ===
- Matt Skiba – guitar, lead vocals
- Dan Andriano – bass, backing vocals
- Derek Grant – drums

=== Additional musicians ===
- Jerry Finn – backing vocals on "All on Black"

=== Production ===
- Joe McGrath – engineer, producer
- Jerry Finn – co-producer, mix engineer
- Christopher Holmes, Jason Gossman, and Robert Reed – assistant engineers
- Brian Gardner – mastering

=== Artwork ===
- Keath Moon – artwork, layout, and design
