= Burn (Alkaline Trio song) =

Single by Alkaline Trio

from the album Crimson
- Released: February 19, 2006
- Recorded: 2004–2005
- Studio: Conway, Los Angeles
- Genre: Alternative rock; punk rock
- Label: Vagrant
- Songwriters: Matt Skiba; Dan Andriano; Derek Grant
- Producer: Jerry Finn

Alkaline Trio singles chronology
"Mercy Me" (2005)	"Burn" (2006)	"Alkaline Trio / Smoking Popes" (2007)

"Burn" is a song by the Chicago-based punk rock band Alkaline Trio, released as the third single from their 2005 album Crimson. It peaked at #34 on the UK Singles Chart. The single was released as both a compact disc and a pair of vinyl 7-inches, each containing different demo, remix, and alternate versions of the song as B-sides. An additional remix version, the "Alleged remix", was released on the Underworld: Evolution: Original Motion Picture Soundtrack.

The song's music video, directed by Piper Ferguson, depicts the band performing "Burn" in a circus setting accompanied by acrobats, contortionists, and other performers. As the song progresses fire is introduced into the performers' acts, and they dance and perform amidst the flames. Bassist Dan Andriano is depicted playing a double bass, though the song is actually performed using a standard bass guitar, and drummer Derek Grant is depicted playing a makeshift drum kit composed of pots, pans, and other objects.

== Track listing ==
=== CD version ===
All tracks are written by Matt Skiba, Dan Andriano, and Derek Grant.

No.	Title	Length
1.	"Burn"	4:05
2.	"Burn" (Test Icicles remix)	3:14
3.	"Burn" (demo)	2:59
Total length:		10:18

- The data portion of the enhanced CD consists of the music video for "Burn".

=== 7" version 1 ===
Side A
No.	Title	Length
1.	"Burn"	4:05

Side B
No.	Title	Length
1.	"Burn" (65daysofstatic remix)	4:33
Total length:		8:38

=== 7" version 2 ===
Side A
No.	Title	Length
1.	"Burn"	4:05

Side B
No.	Title	Length
1.	"Burn" (BBC Zane Lowe session)	3:58
Total length:		8:03

== Personnel ==
=== Band ===
- Matt Skiba – guitar, lead vocals
- Dan Andriano – bass, backing vocals
- Derek Grant – drums

=== Additional musicians ===
- Roger Joseph Manning Jr. – keyboards

=== Production ===
- Jerry Finn – producer, mix engineer
- Ryan Hewitt – engineer
- Seth Waldmann – assistant engineer
- Dave Collins – mastering
