= Stupid Kid =

- The cover of the first version of the single.

Single by Alkaline Trio

from the album From Here to Infirmary
- Released: March 25, 2002
- Recorded: 2000 at Pachyderm Studio, Cannon Falls, Minnesota
- Genre: Pop punk
- Length: 2:23
- Label: Vagrant
- Songwriter(s): Matt Skiba, Dan Andriano, Mike Felumlee
- Producer(s): Matt Allison, Alkaline Trio

Alkaline Trio singles chronology
"Private Eye" (2001)	"Stupid Kid" (2002)	"Halloween" (2002)

Alternative cover
- The cover of the second version of the single.

"Stupid Kid" is a song by the Chicago-based punk rock band Alkaline Trio, released as the first single from the group's 2001 album From Here to Infirmary. Two different versions of the single were released in the United Kingdom, where it became the band's first charting song by reaching #53 on the UK Singles Chart

The song's music video was directed by Matthew Barry and Maureen Egan. It depicts the band performing the song outside of an elementary school. Inside the school, a boy becomes infatuated with his female teacher and makes attempts to impress her. When the teacher writes "you scare me" in the boy's yearbook, he is humiliated in front of the class and the other children laugh at him. He stands outside the classroom window and removes his tuque, revealing a pair of devil-like horns as the teacher is consumed by smoke.

== Track listing ==
Version 1
No.	Title	Writer(s)	Length
1.	"Stupid Kid" (from From Here to Infirmary)	Matt Skiba, Dan Andriano, Mike Felumlee	2:23
2.	"The Metro" (originally performed by Berlin)	John Crawford	3:41
3.	"Private Eye" (from From Here to Infirmary)	Skiba, Andriano, Felumlee	3:30
Total length:			9:31

Version 2
No.	Title	Writer(s)	Length
1.	"Stupid Kid" (from From Here to Infirmary)	Skiba, Andriano, Felumlee	2:23
2.	"She Took Him to the Lake" (from Maybe I'll Catch Fire)	Skiba, Andriano, Glenn Porter	2:40
3.	"You've Got So Far to Go" (from Maybe I'll Catch Fire)	Skiba, Andriano, Porter	3:14
Total length:			8:17

== Personnel ==
=== Band ===
- Matt Skiba – guitar, lead vocals
- Dan Andriano – bass, backing vocals
- Mike Felumlee - drums on "Stupid Kid", "The Metro", and "Private Eye"
- Glenn Porter – drums on "She Took Him to the Lake" and "You've Got so Far to Go"

=== Production ===
- Matt Allison – producer
- Neil Weir – assistant producer on "Stupid Kid", "The Metro", and "Private Eye"
- Jerry Finn – mix engineer on "Stupid Kid", "The Metro", and "Private Eye"
- John Golden – mastering engineer on "She Took Him to the Lake" and "You've Got so Far to Go"
