= We've Had Enough =

Single by Alkaline Trio

from the album Good Mourning
- Released: May 20, 2003
- Recorded: 2002–2003 at Cello Studios
- Genre: Punk rock
- Length: 2:51
- Label: Vagrant
- Songwriters: Matt Skiba, Dan Andriano, Derek Grant
- Producers: Joe McGrath, Jerry Finn

Alkaline Trio singles chronology
"Halloween" (2002)	"We've Had Enough" (2003)	"All on Black" (2003)

"We've Had Enough" is a song by the Chicago-based punk rock band Alkaline Trio, released as the first single from their 2003 album Good Mourning. "We've Had Enough" was released to radio on May 20, 2003. It was the band's first single to chart in the United States, reaching #38 on Billboard's Modern Rock Tracks chart. It also charted in the United Kingdom, reaching #50 on the UK Singles Chart. "We've Had Enough" features backing vocals by Keith Morris, singer of the Circle Jerks and original singer of Black Flag.

The song's music video, directed by Tomorrow's Brightest Minds, depicts the band members as ghosts haunting a family in a house. As the husband unsuccessfully attempts to turn off the radio and television which are broadcasting the song, the wife discovers marked photographs of the band members in life, taken by an unseen person. After the husband witnesses the ghostly figure of a man dragging wrapped bodies through the living room, the two run to check on their son only to find him missing from his bedroom. Directed by the ghosts of the band members, the son leads his parents into the basement where he uses a pickaxe to excavate the skeletons of the murdered members from beneath the concrete floor.

== Track listing ==
All tracks are written by Matt Skiba, Dan Andriano, and Derek Grant.

No.	Title	Length
1.	"We've Had Enough"	2:51
2.	"One Hundred Stories" (demo)	3:43
3.	"Blue in the Face" (demo)	2:48
Total length:		9:22

- The data portion of the enhanced CD consists of the music video for "We've Had Enough".

== Personnel ==
=== Band ===
- Matt Skiba – guitar, lead vocals
- Dan Andriano – bass, backing vocals
- Derek Grant – drums

=== Additional musicians ===
- Keith Morris and Jerry Finn – backing vocals

=== Production ===
- Joe McGrath – recording engineer, producer
- Jerry Finn – co-producer, mix engineer
- Christopher Holmes, Jason Gossman, and Robert Reed – assistant engineers
- Brian Gardner – mastering

=== Artwork ===
- Keath Moon – artwork, layout, and design

== Charts ==
Chart (2003)	Peak position
UK Singles (OCC)	50
US Alternative Airplay (Billboard)	38
