= BYO Split Series Volume V =

Studio album by Alkaline Trio and One Man Army
- Released: April 20, 2004
- Recorded: October 2003, January 2004
- Genre: Punk rock
- Length: 33:45
- Label: BYO (BYO 096)
- Producer: Matt Allison, Chip Hanna

BYO Split Series chronology
Volume IV (2002)	BYO Split Series Volume V (2004)

Alkaline Trio chronology
Good Mourning (2003)	BYO Split Series Volume V (2004)	Crimson (2005)

One Man Army chronology
Rumors and Headlines (2002)	BYO Split Series Volume V (2004)	She's An Alarm (2012)

Professional ratings
Review scores
Source	Rating
AllMusic	3/5 stars
IGN	7.5/10
LAS Magazine	6/10
Punknews.org	4/5 stars

BYO Split Series Volume V is a split album released in 2004 as the fifth entry in BYO Records BYO Split Series. The album features 12 songs from the two punk bands, Alkaline Trio and One Man Army. Unlike the earlier entries in the BYO Split Series, there is only one cover song ("Wait for the Blackout") originally performed by The Damned. The other eleven tracks are brand new.

This album features the first version of Alkaline Trio's "Sadie" which was written about the Manson Family member Susan Atkins.

== Track listing ==
Alkaline Trio
No.	Title	Writer(s)	Length
1.	"Fine Without You"	Matt Skiba, Dan Andriano, Derek Grant	3:15
2.	"Hating Every Minute"	Skiba, Andriano, Grant	3:03
3.	"Dead and Broken"	Skiba, Andriano, Grant	2:09
4.	"Sadie"	Skiba, Andriano, Grant	4:38
5.	"If You Had a Bad Time..."	Skiba, Andriano, Grant	3:38
6.	"Wait for the Blackout" (originally performed by The Damned)	Rat Scabies, Captain Sensible, Dave Vanian, Paul Gray	3:29

One Man Army
No.	Title	Length
7.	"The T.V. Song"	2:31
8.	"The Hemophiliac"	1:28
9.	"All the Way"	2:26
10.	"The Radio Airwaves Gave Me a Lobotomy"	2:04
11.	"I.F.H.A. (One Love)"	2:07
12.	"Let's Call It An Evening"	2:57
Total length:		33:45
