= Mercy Me =

Single by Alkaline Trio

from the album Crimson
- Released: September 27, 2005
- Recorded: 2004–2005 at Conway Studios, Los Angeles
- Genre: Pop punk
- Label: Vagrant
- Songwriters: Matt Skiba, Dan Andriano, Derek Grant
- Producer: Jerry Finn

Alkaline Trio singles chronology
"Time to Waste" (2005)	"Mercy Me" (2005)	"Burn" (2006)

"Mercy Me" is a song by the Chicago-based rock band Alkaline Trio, released as the second single from their 2005 album Crimson. "Mercy Me" was released to radio on September 27, 2005. It peaked at No. 30 on the UK Singles Chart and No. 89 on the Eurochart Hot 100 Singles. The single was released as a CD backed with an acoustic recording of "Private Eye" as well as "Buried", a B-side from the album's recording sessions. It was also released as a set of two 7" records, backed with acoustic recordings of "This Could Be Love" and "Crawl".

It is also featured in videogame Flatout 2 and as a DLC for Rock Band 4.

The song's music video was directed by Ben Goldman.

== Track listing ==
=== CD version ===
No.	Title	Writer(s)	Length
1.	"Mercy Me"	Matt Skiba, Dan Andriano, Derek Grant	2:49
2.	"Private Eye" (acoustic)	Skiba, Andriano, Mike Felumlee	3:37
3.	"Buried"	Skiba, Andriano, Grant	3:17
Total length:			9:43

- The data portion of the enhanced CD consists of the music video for "Mercy Me".

=== 7" version 1 ===
Side A
No.	Title	Writer(s)	Length
1.	"Mercy Me"	Skiba, Andriano, Grant	2:49

Side B
No.	Title	Writer(s)	Length
1.	"This Could Be Love" (acoustic)	Skiba, Andriano, Grant	4:04
Total length:			6:53

=== 7" version 2 ===
Side A
No.	Title	Writer(s)	Length
1.	"Mercy Me"	Skiba, Andriano, Grant	2:49

Side B
No.	Title	Writer(s)	Length
1.	"Crawl" (acoustic)	Skiba, Andriano, Felumlee	4:15
Total length:			7:04

== Personnel ==
=== Band ===
- Matt Skiba – guitar, lead vocals
- Dan Andriano – bass, backing vocals
- Derek Grant – drums

=== Production ===
- Jerry Finn – producer, mix engineer
- Ryan Hewitt – engineer
- Seth Waldmann – assistant engineer
- Dave Collins – mastering
