= Time to Waste =

Single by Alkaline Trio

from the album Crimson
- Released: May 24, 2005
- Recorded: 2004–2005 at Conway Studios, Los Angeles
- Genre: Punk rock, pop-punk
- Label: Vagrant
- Songwriters: Matt Skiba, Dan Andriano, Derek Grant
- Producer: Jerry Finn

Alkaline Trio singles chronology
| "All on Black" (2003) | "Time to Waste" (2005) | "Mercy Me" (2005) |

"Time to Waste" is a song by Chicago punk rock band Alkaline Trio, released as the first single from their 2005 album Crimson. "Time to Waste" was released to radio on May 24, 2005. It peaked at #40 on Billboard's Modern Rock Tracks chart, #32 on the UK Singles Chart, and #97 on the Eurochart Hot 100 Singles. It was backed with the B-side songs "We Can Never Break Up" and "Don't Say You Won't" from the album's recording sessions.

The song's music video, directed by Linkin Park's Joseph Hahn, depicts the band performing "Time to Waste" in a hangar to the accompaniment of lighting effects and background projection screens.

== Track listing ==
=== CD versions ===
All tracks are written by Matt Skiba, Dan Andriano, and Derek Grant.

American version
| No. | Title | Length |
|---|---|---|
| 1. | "Time to Waste" | 4:11 |
| 2. | "We Can Never Break Up" | 3:10 |
| Total length: | | 7:21 |

British version
| No. | Title | Length |
|---|---|---|
| 1. | "Time to Waste" | 4:11 |
| 2. | "We Can Never Break Up" | 3:10 |
| 3. | "Don't Say You Won't" | 2:21 |
| Total length: | | 9:42 |

=== 7" version ===
Side A
| No. | Title | Length |
|---|---|---|
| 1. | "Time to Waste" | 4:11 |

Side B
| No. | Title | Length |
|---|---|---|
| 1. | "Don't Say You Won't" | 2:21 |
| Total length: | | 6:32 |

=== DVD version ===
All tracks are written by Matt Skiba, Dan Andriano, and Derek Grant.

| No. | Title | Length |
|---|---|---|
| 1. | "Time to Waste" (audio) | 4:11 |
| 2. | "Time To Waste" (music video) | 4:19 |
| 3. | "music video outtakes" |

== Personnel ==
=== Band ===
- Matt Skiba – guitar, lead vocals
- Dan Andriano – bass, backing vocals
- Derek Grant – drums

=== Additional musicians ===
- Roger Joseph Manning, Jr. - piano

=== Production ===
- Jerry Finn – producer, mix engineer
- Ryan Hewitt – engineer
- Seth Waldmann – assistant engineer
- Dave Collins – mastering

== Cover art ==
The album's cover art, by Heather Hannoura, features a black-and-white picture version of an image from Book Three of Max Ernst's Une Semaine de Bonté.

== Charts ==
| Chart (2005) | Peak position |
|---|---|
| UK Singles (OCC) | 32 |
| US Alternative Airplay (Billboard) | 40 |
