= Heavens (band) =

American indie rock band

Background information
- Origin: United States
- Genres: Alternative rock, indie rock
- Years active: 2004–2007
- Label: Epitaph
- Members: Matt Skiba; Josiah Steinbrick

Heavens was an indie rock band featuring Matt Skiba of Alkaline Trio, and Josiah Steinbrick of F-Minus. The duo signed to Epitaph Records and released their debut album, Patent Pending, on September 12, 2006.

The album was recorded in Los Angeles with producer and composer Ben Lovett.

Heavens spent the 2006 fall season playing the UK and select dates across the US with Darker My Love.

== Discography ==
=== Studio albums ===
- Patent Pending (September 12, 2006)

=== Singles ===
- "Patent Pending" (2006)

=== Videography ===
- "Patent Pending" (2006)

== Samples ==
- "Patent Pending" at Epitaph.com
- Heavens on MySpace
