= Alkaline Trio (album) =

Compilation album by Alkaline Trio
- Released: April 18, 2000
- Recorded: 1996, March 1998, March 1999, and July 1999 at Atlas Studios, Chicago; Early 1999 in Homewood, Illinois
- Length: 41:27
- Label: Asian Man
- Producer: Matt Allison, Alkaline Trio

Alkaline Trio chronology
Maybe I'll Catch Fire (2000)	Alkaline Trio (2000)	From Here to Infirmary (2001)

Alkaline Trio is a compilation album by American punk rock band of the same name, released April 18, 2000 through Asian Man Records. It includes all of the tracks from their EPs For Your Lungs Only (1998) and I Lied My Face Off (1999), as well as both tracks from the "Sundials" single (1997) and several tracks from other compilations.

== Reception ==
Professional ratings
Review scores
Source	Rating
AllMusic	4.5/5 stars
Ox-Fanzine	Favorable

By August 2008, the album sold 85,000 copies. Ari Wiznitzer of Allmusic praised the compilation, comparing the songs' lyrics to those of Blake Schwarzenbach and saying that "What separates this record from most compilations of its kind is both consistency and excellent sequencing. This is the band's best batch of songs since Goddamnit, and although taken from disparate sources, the record has the feel of a long-player."

== Track listing ==
All tracks are written by Matt Skiba, Dan Andriano, and Glenn Porter, except where noted.

No.	Title	Writer(s)	Length
1.	"Goodbye Forever" (from I Lied My Face Off, 1999)		2:50
2.	"This Is Getting Over You" (from I Lied My Face Off, 1999)		4:46
3.	"Bleeder" (from I Lied My Face Off, 1999)		4:30
4.	"I Lied My Face Off" (from I Lied My Face Off, 1999)		4:09
5.	"My Friend Peter" (from Magnetic Curses, 2000)		2:14
6.	"Snake Oil Tanker" (from For Your Lungs Only, 1998)		1:22
7.	"Southern Rock" (from For Your Lungs Only, 1998)		3:04
8.	"Cooking Wine" (from For Your Lungs Only, 1998)		2:19
9.	"For Your Lungs Only" (from For Your Lungs Only, 1998)		2:26
10.	"Exploding Boy" (from Pocket Bomb, 1999, originally performed by The Cure)	Robert Smith	2:57
11.	"Sundials" (from "Sundials", 1997)	Skiba, Rob Doran, Porter	3:43
12.	"Nose Over Tail" (from "Sundials", 1997)	Skiba, Doran, Porter	2:35
13.	"'97" (from Marc's a Dick and Gar's a Drunk: The Johann's Face Story, 1997)	Skiba, Doran, Porter	4:32
Total length:			41:27

== Personnel ==
- Matt Skiba – guitar, lead vocals (except tracks 2 and 4), backing vocals
- Dan Andriano – bass, backing vocals (tracks 1–10), lead vocals (tracks 2 and 4)
- Rob Doran – bass (tracks 11–13)
- Glenn Porter – drums
