= Crimson (Alkaline Trio album) =

Studio album by Alkaline Trio
- Released: May 24, 2005
- Recorded: November 2004 – January 2005
- Studio: Conway, Los Angeles, California
- Genre: Punk rock, pop-punk
- Length: 42:50
- Label: Vagrant
- Producer: Jerry Finn

Alkaline Trio chronology
BYO Split Series, Vol. 5 (2005)	Crimson (2005)	Remains (2007)

Singles from Crimson
- 1. "Time to Waste" Released: May 24, 2005; 2. "Mercy Me" Released: September 27, 2005; 3. "Burn" Released: February 19, 2006

Crimson is the fifth studio album by American rock band Alkaline Trio. Produced by Jerry Finn, it was released on May 24, 2005, by Vagrant.

== Recording ==
Recording took place at Conway Studios in Los Angeles, California, with producer Jerry Finn between November 2004 and January 2005. Ryan Hewitt engineered the sessions with assistance from Seth Waldmann. A few people contributed to the recordings: Roger Joseph Manning Jr. (piano and keyboards), Nolan McGuire (guitar on "Sadie"), Heather Hannoura (spoken word on "Sadie") and Warren Fitzgerald (additional string arrangements). Finn mixed the recordings, while Dave Collins mastered them at Dave Collins Mastering. A tentative title for the album was Church and Destroy.

This album would prove to be the band's final album with Finn involved in any capacity before his death in 2008.

Bassist Dan Andriano described the recording process as below:

It was kind of the same as always. We just spent a little more time in all areas of the recording process. We spent a little more time in pre-production, where we worked on the songs with Jerry. Before we started recording, he came out to Chicago and [came to practices] and he was listening to the songs, and we had an opportunity to ask him what he thought. It kind of gave us more time to re-work some stuff that we thought could have been a little better but were a little stumped on, as Jerry had good ideas for the songs. And as far as the actual recording, it was great working with him. It was more like working with a friend. We've known Jerry for a long time, and he's really easy to work with and be around for 12 hours a day. He's got an amazing gear collection. Any kind of guitar you want to use for a song or any kind of amplifier, he probably has it—and he probably has one of the nicest ones of that model. To me, recording was like being in a playground. It's just like, "Let me play this one. Let me try this." Every bass track on the record was recorded with an old Marshall guitar amp.

== Songs ==
The song "Sadie" was written about Susan Atkins (aka Sadie Mae Glutz) a murderer in the Charles Manson family, who took part in the Sharon Tate murders in 1969. The quotation near the end of the song is a quote from Susan's testimony which is spoken by Heather Gabel, the band's merchandise and artwork creator.

The song "Prevent This Tragedy" refers to the West Memphis Three, whose trial and conviction for triple homicide in 1993 is considered controversial.

Skiba on "Sadie":

That song was actually the first song that we wrote for Crimson. We were still touring on our previous record and I wrote it just on tour. We started playing it at soundcheck and we had planned to do this split with One Man Army on BYO. That’s where that song came from originally. But we knew even then that we were probably wanting to re-record it and putting it on an album, which it was on Crimson later. So yeah, I think that came from knowing that we were starting to write a new record and wanting to take a different approach. As I said before, you don’t ever want to write the same record twice. So yeah, I think it was just a fresh start and it just had a different kind of feel and sort of set the tone for Crimson, not that there is other songs like it on the record. But it’s definitely a good thing to get the ball rolling.

Andriano on "Smoke":

It's the last song on the record. I actually wrote that song like two years ago. I knew I liked certain aspects of the song, and those were basically the aspects of the song that made it to the final version. For the two years before we recorded it, I had been kind of toiling over this. It was kind of the bane of my writing existence. It scared me, because I knew I liked parts of it but was really unhappy with other parts. I couldn't make the vibe work. There was a time when that song was really soft, actually. I tried to make it like a loud, mid-tempo rock number, but nothing really worked. That was one that we spent a lot of time on actually, making that groove that we wanted that's there now, almost a ballad [like] kind of song. It gave us a lot of time to think about cool effects, effects we could use on the chorus and string parts that are in the song.

== Artwork ==
The album's cover art features the band's former drummer Derek Grant and Matt Skiba's then-fiancée (and now ex-wife), Monica.

According to Matt Skiba, the band were:

"doing the photo shoot and we had a completely different idea of what the record was going to look like. And Monica was there doing our styling; she got a bunch of outfits and she did the styling for pretty much all the new pictures for the record. She was there and the photographer was just doing all these different things and he had her stand in. He was toying with these different ideas with just a small portion of her face in the picture and then, lo and behold, she's our cover star. So we thought it looked cool and the people at the art department are in cahoots with the photographer who is amazing. Everybody who worked on the thing was cool and hands on and saw these pictures of her and were asking “who is that?” I said “that's my girlfriend” and they said “that's perfect, we have to use her." I think it looks very cinematic, and that's what we were going for. Once it was coming together, it was like film noir."

== Release ==
On March 16, 2005, Crimson was announced for release the following month; in the same post, the album's track listing was revealed. The artwork was posted online nine days later. "Time to Waste" premiered through AOL Music on April 16, 2005, before it was released as a Hot Topic-exclusive single (with "We Can Never Break Up" as its B-side) in early May 2005. Following this, Alkaline Trio appeared at The Bamboozle festival and went on a short series of East Coast dates with support from Colossal and Mike Park. The music video for "Time to Waste" was posted online on May 17, 2005, directed by Joe Hahn; with it, the band wanted to make "something simple, yet atmospheric", opting for Hahn's video treatment that shows timing passing. Crimson was made available for streaming through MTV2 on May 18, 2005, before being released on May 24 through Vagrant Records. The following day, they appeared on Late Night with Conan O'Brien. In June and July 2005, they went on an Midwest and West Cast tour with Death by Stereo, Rise Against, Rufio and Thieves Like Us. Following this, the band went on a European tour in August and September, which included appearances at the Pukkelpop, Indoor and Reading and Leeds Festivals.

Skiba participated in the Plea for Peace Tour in September 2005. The music video for "Mercy Me" was posted on Yahoo! Launch's website on September 18, 2005, while the track was released to radio on nine days later. The band supported My Chemical Romance on their headlining US tour in September and October 2005. Following this, they embarked on a UK tour in the next month with Mike Park. A two-disc deluxe edition was released on December 6, 2005, through Vagrant. The second disc features demo recordings, acoustic versions of songs on the album and music videos. Around its release, the band performed at the FNX Throws a Holiday Show, Next Big Thing, and The Night The Buzz Stole Christmas radio festivals. "Burn" was released as a single on February 20, 2006; across the various CD, 7" vinyl and digital download versions, remixes, radio session and demo versions were included as extra tracks. Remixes by Tim Armstrong of Rancid and Test Icles were posted online a few days prior to promote it. Alkaline Trio went on a brief tour of Europe to promote the single in February 2006, before appearing at the Independence-D festival in Japan. This was followed by a tour of Australia in early March 2006. From March to May 2006, the group went on The Occult Roots of Alkaline Trio: Early Songs for Eerie People tour, on which the group played material from their back catalog. They were supported by Against Me!. The group went on a Canadian tour with the Lawrence Arms and the Black Maria, which led into a brief US West Coast trek with the Lawrence Arms and the Draft.

== Reception ==
Professional ratings
Review scores
Source	Rating
AllMusic	4.5/5 stars
Chart Attack	Favorable
Drowned in Sound	8/10
IGN	7.5/10
LAS Magazine	8/10
Melodic	3.5/5 stars
PopMatters	8/10
Punknews.org	4/5 stars
Rolling Stone	3/5 stars
Stylus	B+

The album sold 42,624 copies, charting at number 25 on the Billboard 200. By August 2008, the album sold 204,000 copies.

== Track listing ==
=== Original release ===
All songs written by Alkaline Trio.

No.	Title	Length
1.	"Time to Waste"	4:11
2.	"The Poison"	2:04
3.	"Burn"	4:05
4.	"Mercy Me"	2:49
5.	"Dethbed"	3:03
6.	"Settle for Satin"	3:49
7.	"Sadie"	4:39
8.	"Fall Victim"	3:18
9.	"I Was a Prayer"	2:36
10.	"Prevent This Tragedy"	3:06
11.	"Back to Hell"	2:54
12.	"Your Neck"	3:15
13.	"Smoke"	3:00

=== Deluxe edition ===
1. "Time to Waste" (demo) – 3:24
2. "The Poison" (demo) – 1:34
3. "Burn" (Matt's home demo) – 2:57
4. "Mercy Me" (acoustic) – 3:12
5. "Dethbed" (demo) – 2:56
6. "Settle for Satin" (demo) – 3:31
7. "Sadie" (acoustic) – 3:19
8. "Fall Victim" (demo) – 3:04
9. "I Was a Prayer" (acoustic) – 2:54
10. "Prevent This Tragedy" (demo) – 3:40
11. "Back to Hell" (Matt's home demo) – 2:56
12. "Your Neck" (demo) – 3:14
13. "Smoke" (demo) – 3:07
14. "Time to Waste" (acoustic) – 4:21
15. "Time to Waste" (video)
16. "Mercy Me" (video)
17. "Burn" (video)

== Personnel ==
Personnel per booklet.

Alkaline Trio

- Dan Andriano – bass, vocals
- Matt Skiba – guitars, vocals
- Derek Grant – drums, vocals

Additional musicians

- Roger Joseph Manning Jr. – piano, keyboards
- Nolan McGuire – lead guitar (track 7)
- Heather Hannoura – spoken word (track 7)
- Warren Fitzgerald – additional string arrangements

Production

- Jerry Finn – producer, mixing
- Ryan Hewitt – engineer
- Seth Waldmann – assistance
- Dave Collins – mastering
- David Raccuglia – photos
- TODA – art direction
- Heather Hannoura – art direction

== Charts ==
Chart performance
Chart (2005)	Peak position
Scottish Albums (OCC)	29
UK Albums (OCC)	34
UK Independent Albums (OCC)	2
UK Rock & Metal Albums (OCC)	3
US Billboard 200	25

== Certifications ==
Certifications
Region	Certification	Certified units/sales
United Kingdom (BPI)	Silver	60,000^{‡}
^{‡} Sales+streaming figures based on certification alone.
