= Agony & Irony =

Studio album by Alkaline Trio
- Released: July 1, 2008
- Genre: Pop punk
- Length: 39:42
- Label: Epic
- Producer: Josh Abraham

Alkaline Trio chronology
Remains (2007)	Agony & Irony (2008)	This Addiction (2010)

Singles from Agony & Irony
- 1. "Help Me" Released: April 28, 2008; 2. "Over and Out" Released: October 21, 2008

Agony & Irony is the sixth studio album and major label debut by American punk rock band Alkaline Trio, released July 1, 2008, on Epic Records. Produced by Josh Abraham, the album was preceded by the single "Help Me".

== Background ==
On October 12, 2006, the band announced they had signed with major label V2 Records. In addition, it was mentioned that the band was working on new songs, and was aiming to record a new album in early 2007. However, in January 2007, V2 went through a restructuring process which left the fate of its acts unknown. Drummer Derek Grant said the band had 18 songs, which they were in the process of demoing in Los Angeles, California. Though, they were expecting to record their next album in April 2007, each member was focused elsewhere: Skiba with Heavens and touring with Chuck Ragan, Andriano as a studio musician, and Grant writing R&B songs while constructing a studio. On May 28, 2007, the group announced they had signed to another major label, Epic Records. Three days later, "Fire Down Below" was posted on the band's Myspace profile. They performed on that year's Warped Tour for two weeks; they debuted a new track, titled "In Vein". Following these dates, the band entered the studio to work on their next album. Recording began in early 2008; the proceedings were documented on an online journal through their fan club Blood Pact.

== Composition ==
The album features a pop punk style, but more pop rock-oriented compared to the band's previous, punk rock-oriented albums. Regarding this album, vocalist and guitarist Matt Skiba stated that the band set out to record an "anthemic hard rock record." Regarding the record's sound and influences, Skiba states that he was "listening to a lot of Pat Benatar, Def Leppard and a lot of the 80s MTV music that I grew up with. So that was a big influence in the writing process, bands like The Cars". Norwegian experimental band Ulver contributed strings, programming and vocals on "Lost & Rendered" and "In My Stomach." Douglas P. of English neofolk group Death in June contributed a spoken word introduction to "I Found Away". "Help Me" was inspired by the Joy Division film Control (2007).

In an interview promoting the album, Matt Skiba cites that:

there’s a theme of duality on the record, it’s sort of a spin on ‘ebony and ivory’ which of course represents black and white. The songs on the new album sort of represent a struggle between good and evil, light and dark, and despair and hope. We felt Agony and Irony was appropriate, I mean we fancy ourselves as being pretty clever, and we felt a play on words was also fitting for the new record. It's also a lyric from 'Flagpole Sitta' by Harvey Danger, so we thought we earn double points for that.

== Release ==
On April 4, "In Vein" was made available for streaming through the band's Myspace profile. It was mentioned that the band's untitled next album would be released in three months' time. The following day, the band appeared at the Bamboozle Left festival. On April 7, the album's title Agony & Irony and track listing was revealed. The following day, "Help Me" was posted on Myspace; it was released to radio stations on April 22. On the latter day, an Agony & Irony EP was released, featuring "Help Me", "In Vein" and "Into the Night". In May and June, the band participated in the Zumiez Couch Tour alongside Kandi Coded, Our Last Night and Dr. Manhattan, which was followed by an East Coast tour for the remained of June 2008. A music video for "Help Me" premiered through MTV on June 30, 2008. According to Alternative Press, it contains "100% less on-the-road and concert footage and 100% more Matt Skiba dressed up as someone from Young Guns flying with a jetpack." Agony & Irony was made available for streaming on June 27 on their Myspace; it released on July 1, 2008, through Epic Records. For those that pre-ordered the vinyl edition, they were given a free seven-inch record that featured "Help Me" and a cover of "Wake Up Exhausted" (2004) by Tegan and Sara.

The album was promoted with a US tour until August 2008, with support from Bayside and American Steel. Following this, they appeared at the Pukkelpop and Edgefest festivals. In October and November, the band supported Rise Against on their headlining tour of the US. Due to Rise Against vocalist Tim McIlrath becoming ill, Alkaline Trio performed two shows with another band on the tour, Thrice. "Over and Out" was released radio on October 21, 2008; a week later, the band appeared on Jimmy Kimmel Live! performing "Calling All Skeletons". In January and February 2009, the band went on a tour of Europe with the Audition and Broadway Calls. During this stint, the band played a Myspace Transmission session, where they performed "Over and Out" and "Love Love Kiss Kiss". In February and March, the band toured Australia as part of the Soundwave festival. Also in March, the band launched a contest for fans to remix "I Found Away" that would be included on a digital release titled Remix EP. In April 2009, the band went on the Pick Up the Phone tour, alongside Anberlin and Single File, at college campuses in the US; it was intended to raise awareness of suicide and mental health problems. Following this, the band went on a tour of the East Coast and Midwest with Saves the Day and were supported by Death in the Park. Further dates were added, extending the tour into mid-May. Following this, the band supported the Offspring on their Shit Is Fucked Up Tour in May and June 2009, and then appeared at the West Coast Riot festival in Sweden. In June 2013, independent label Shop Radio Cast released the album as a two-LP set with a booklet and additional recordings.

== Reception ==
Professional ratings
Review scores
Source	Rating
AbsolutePunk.net	(76%)
AllMusic	3/5 stars
The A.V. Club	B+
Blender	3/5 stars
IGN	8.3/10
Melodic	3/5 stars
Rolling Stone	3.5/5 stars

By August 2008, the album sold 57,000 copies. Rock Sound ranked it at number 11 on their list of the year's best albums.

== Track listing ==
All Tracks by Alkaline Trio.

No.	Title	Length
1.	"Calling All Skeletons"	3:19
2.	"Help Me"	3:44
3.	"In Vein"	3:57
4.	"Over and Out"	3:14
5.	"I Found Away"	4:01
6.	"Do You Wanna Know?"	3:36
7.	"Live Young, Die Fast"	4:14
8.	"Love Love, Kiss Kiss"	3:25
9.	"Lost and Rendered"	3:23
10.	"Ruin It"	3:36
11.	"Into the Night"	3:23

Bonus tracks

- "In My Stomach" – 3:53 (iTunes bonus track)
- "Love Love, Kiss Kiss (acoustic)" – 3:08 (Australian bonus track)
- "Fire Down Below" – 3:43 (Japanese bonus track)

Deluxe edition bonus disc

1. "Burned Is the House" – 4:26
2. "Maybe I'll Catch Fire (acoustic)" – 3:04
3. "Live Young, Die Fast (acoustic)" – 3:19
4. "Into the Night (acoustic)" – 3:12
5. "Over and Out (acoustic)" – 2:47
6. "Lost and Rendered (acoustic)" – 3:13

== Charts ==
Chart performance
Chart (2008)	Peak position
Australian Albums (ARIA)	95
Canadian Albums (Nielsen SoundScan)	49
Scottish Albums (Official Charts)	45
UK Albums (Official Charts)	52
US Billboard 200	13
US Indie Store Album Sales (Billboard)	2
US Top Alternative Albums (Billboard)	4
US Top Rock Albums (Billboard)	5
