= Private Eye (song) =

- The cover of the first version of the single.

Single by Alkaline Trio

from the album From Here to Infirmary
- Released: November 15, 2001
- Recorded: 2000 at Pachyderm Studio, Cannon Falls, Minnesota
- Genre: Pop punk
- Length: 3:30
- Label: Vagrant
- Songwriters: Matt Skiba, Dan Andriano, Mike Felumlee
- Producers: Matt Allison, Alkaline Trio

Alkaline Trio singles chronology
"Hell Yes" (2001)	"Private Eye" (2001)	"Stupid Kid" (2002)

Alternative cover
- The cover of the second version of the single.

"Private Eye" is a song by the Chicago-based punk rock band Alkaline Trio, released as the second single from their 2001 album From Here to Infirmary. Two different versions of the single were released in the United Kingdom, where it reached #51 on the UK Singles Chart

The song's music video is compiled from live footage of the band performing "Private Eye" on several dates of their 2000 tour, with touring drummer Adam Willard filling in following Mike Felumlee's departure from the group.

The song appears on the soundtrack to the 2014 video game Watch Dogs.

== Track listing ==
All tracks are written by Matt Skiba, Dan Andriano, and Mike Felumlee, except where noted.

Version 1
No.	Title	Length
1.	"Private Eye" (radio edit)	3:14
2.	"Private Eye" (album version)	3:30

- The data portion of the enhanced CD consists of the music video for "Stupid Kid".

Version 2
No.	Title	Writer(s)	Length
1.	"Private Eye"		3:30
2.	"Mr. Chainsaw" (live at the University of London Union)
3.	"Cringe" (live at the University of London Union)	Skiba, Andriano, Glenn Porter

== Personnel ==
=== Band ===
- Matt Skiba – guitar, lead vocals
- Dan Andriano – bass, backing vocals
- Mike Felumlee – drums on "Private Eye"
- Adam Willard – drums on "Mr. Chainsaw" and "Cringe"

=== Production ===
- Matt Allison – producer on "Private Eye"
- Neil Weir – assistant producer on "Private Eye"
- Jerry Finn – mix engineer on "Private Eye"
