= From Here to Infirmary =

Studio album by Alkaline Trio
- Released: April 3, 2001
- Recorded: 2000
- Studios: Pachyderm, Cannon Falls, Minnesota
- Genres: Pop-punk; punk rock
- Length: 38:13
- Label: Vagrant
- Producers: Matt Allison, Alkaline Trio

Alkaline Trio chronology
Alkaline Trio (2000)	From Here to Infirmary (2001)	Alkaline Trio / Hot Water Music (2002)

Singles from From Here to Infirmary
- 1. "Private Eye" Released: November 15, 2001; 2. "Stupid Kid" Released: March 25, 2002

From Here to Infirmary is the third studio album by American punk rock band Alkaline Trio. It was their first album for Vagrant and their only album with Mike Felumlee, who replaced their previous drummer, Glenn Porter. When Felumlee left the band shortly after the album's release, Atom Willard filled in on tour and appeared in the music video for "Private Eye", before Derek Grant became their new permanent drummer.

== Background and production ==
Alkaline Trio released their second studio album Maybe I'll Catch Fire in March 2000, through record label Asian Man Records. Few months prior to its release, drummer Glenn Porter left the band, and was replaced by former Smoking Popes member Mike Felumlee. Two months after the album's release, MTV reported that the band had signed to Vagrant Records. Vocalist/guitarist Matt Skiba explained that while on Asian Man, they received plenty of complaints that their fans were unable to buy their music in stores. Vagrant were fans of the band, and helped them tour with Face to Face. That label's distribution and press departments offered more than Asian Man founder Mike Park was able to provide. Park went as far to tell the band to find a bigger label as the sales and promotion was becoming a strain for him.

In the following months, Alkaline Trio promoted Maybe I'll Catch Fire with an appearance on the Plea for Peace Tour, and a tour with Hot Water Music. At the end of 2000, the band went to Pachyderm Studio in Cannon Falls, Minnesota to record their next album. Matt Allison and the band acted as producers, assistance from Neil Weir. Allison and the band recorded 15 tracks in total, with the aim of using 12 for the final track listing. The recordings were mixed by Jerry Finn, with assistance from Laurent Bichara, at Engine Studios in Chicago, Illinois. The band picked Finn for his previous work on a Smoking Popes album a few years prior. Bassist/vocalist Dan Andriano later expressed disappointment in the album's production, his vocal performance, and the lack of vocal harmonies; he ranked it seventh out of the eight albums they had released at that point.

== Composition and lyrics ==
Musically, the sound of From Here to Infirmary has been described as pop-punk and punk rock, with more of a focus on melody. Skiba explained that the band were moving in "a more pop direction", which he said they had always wanted to do, and "now have just perfected it." Andriano considered it a turning point for the band musically: "From Here to Infirmary definitely started to shape things up with more of a straight up rock kind of sound. I think the previous two albums are really great, but are a bit meandering. I think [From Here to Infirmary] is when Matt [Skiba] and I both realized that we wanted to tighten the screws a bit, simplify things a little and focus more on punching you in the nuts with our rock". Andriano wrote "Take Lots with Alcohol", "Another Innocent Girl", "I'm Dying Tomorrow", and "Crawl", while the rest of the songs were written by Skiba.

The opening track "Private Eye" details loneliness and alcohol abuse, channeling the guitarwork of Green Day and Blink-182. "Mr. Chainsaw" was reminiscent of "Clavicle", a track from the band's debut studio album, Goddamnit (1998). "Stupid Kid" is a pop punk song that utilizes a staccato guitar riff. It recalled the early works of Green Day, while following track "Another Innocent Girl" evokes Maybe I'll Catch Fire song "You've Got So Far to Go". "You're Dead" is a slower song that came across like "San Francisco", another track from Goddamnit. The guitarwork in "You're Dead" was compared to that heard in "Fire Maple Song" (1993) by Everclear. "Armageddon" is an uptempo punk rock track. Andriano's vocals in the closing song "Crawl" earned it a comparison to the Smoking Popes.

== Release and promotion ==
Two of the album's outtakes, "Hell Yes" and "My Standard Break from Life", were released on 7" vinyl through Lookout! Records on March 13, 2001. From Here to Infirmary was released on April 3, 2001, by Vagrant Records. With the cover artwork, Skiba said the band attempt to give the album a "metal" look. They initially had different ideas for the cover, however, the band was on tour at the time, and had to relay their ideas to Vagrant. When they returned from tour, the cover wasn't what they wanted; the artwork was a week past the deadline. Skiba, still with no idea for the final cover, told the label to use photos of the band: "When I saw it I said, 'make the eyes go away,' and I was like 'There’s the cover.'" The UK version of the album, which included "My Standard Break from Life" and "Hell Yes" as bonus tracks, was co-released by B-Unique and Vagrant.

On July 2, 2001, Felumlee took to the band's webboard to announce his departure, stating that Skiba "doesn't want to tour with me anymore." The following day, the band's manager posted on the webboard, explaining that Skiba had planned to replace Felumlee after their previous tour ended. Skiba and Felumlee weren't getting along; Skiba wished to tour all-year around, however, Felumlee didn't want to as he was looking after his family. Face to Face member Pete Parada, along with Atom Willard of Rocket from the Crypt, subsequently filled Felumlee's position. Alkaline Trio knew Parada from previously playing shows with Face to Face; Skiba grew up admiring Rocket from the Crypt, and was influenced by Willard. Felumee formed Duvall with members of the Smoking Popes shortly afterwards. On July 8, 2001, the music video for "Stupid Kid" was posted on the band's website. The video was directed by Maureen Egan, the sister of Vagrant owner Rich Egan.

Following this, Derek Grant, formerly of the Suicide Machines, joined as Felumlee's full-time replacement. Andriano met Grant when his former band Slapstick went on tour with Suicide Machines. Grant, who had temporarily filled Josh Freese's position in the Vandals, had heard that Alkaline Trio was looking for a permanent member. On November 15, 2001, "Private Eye" was released as a single. Two versions were released on CD: one with the full version and an edit of "Private Eye", as well as the "Stupid Kid" music video, while the other featured the edit of "Private Eye", and live versions of "Mr. Chainsaw" and "Cringe". On March 25, 2002, "Stupid Kid" was released as a single. Two versions were released on CD: one with a cover of the Berlin song "Metro" (1981), as well as the "Private Eye" music video, while the other featured live versions of "She Took Him to the Lake" and "You've Go So Far to Go".

== Touring ==
Alkaline Trio played a series of shows throughout April 2001, leading to a support slot for Blink-182 the following month. They went on a cross-country tour from late May through to the end of June. The band toured the midwest until late July, where they appeared on six dates of the Vagrant America tour and at Krazy Fest 4 in Louisville, Kentucky. Around this time, the band had no copies of their album to sell due to a lawsuit Vagrant was having with their distributor. The band performed on the Plea for Peace/Take Action Tour alongside Thrice, Hot Water Music, and Cave In in August and early September. Skiba embarked on an acoustic tour for the remainder of September. Alkaline Trio was due to support Blink-182 on their European stadium tour; the trek was ultimately canceled, and the band spent time at home.

Preceded by a handful of mainland European dates in November 2001, the band then embarked on their first ever tour of the UK, which ran into December. The UK shows were supported by Crackout. After returning to the US, they played a few holiday shows with the Get Up Kids until Christmas. In January 2002, the band embarked on a second UK tour, before playing a few west coast US shows in the following month supporting the Bouncing Souls. They toured the UK a third time in March 2002, with support from Face to Face and Saves the Day. Around their appearance at Skate & Surf Festival, Alkaline Trio played several shows in April. Between June and August, the band went on the 2002 Warped Tour. The band had planned to appear at the Reading Festival in the UK, but pulled out shortly before it happened. They concluded the year with two shows in their hometown of Chicago, Illinois.

== Reception ==
Professional ratings
Review scores
Source	Rating
AbsolutePunk	Favorable
AllMusic	2.5/5 stars
Exclaim!	Favorable
The Morning Call	Favorable
NME	4/5 stars
Ox-Fanzine	Favorable
Pitchfork	6.5/10
Punknews.org	3/5 stars
Rolling Stone	3.5/5 stars
Tiny Mix Tapes	2.5/5 stars

Critical reaction to the album was mixed. Ari Wiznitzer of AllMusic called it a slump for the band and "a definite low point in Alkaline Trio's catalog", criticizing its "lighter, more mainstream sound" which "really doesn't complement Matt Skiba and Dan Andriano's foul-mouthed poetry as well as their earlier abrasive sound. Adding to the disappointment is that this is the first Alkaline Trio release to have any filler, as many of the songs seem painfully tossed off (and probably were, as the band has been so prolific)." Matt Hendrickson of Rolling Stone was more praising of the album's qualities, remarking that the band "deliver[s] catchy punk pop with sharp elbows and a wry sense of humor" and that "What saves them from the gutter are some effortless hooks and Skiba's hysterical lyrics".

John Dark of Pitchfork remarked, "There's quite a bit that Alkaline Trio's music is not. It's not challenging, ambitious, or visionary. It's not clever or self-aware. It's not even terribly skillful. But what it is, is tasty. Pure musical junk food: fast, greasy, and crafted for a general palate." He criticized some of the music as "a tad too derivative for your average rock snob", but praised the band's lyricism and ability to turn a phrase, though noting that they would occasionally "jar you back to reality with bonehead moves like spelling out the very, very thinly-disguised metaphor in one song [("Mr. Chainsaw")] for the listener". Ultimately, though, he concluded, "for all its flaws, From Here to Infirmary remains nothing more than simply what it is: tuneful, consumable, and guiltily satisfying."

From Here to Infirmary was also their first album to chart, reaching number 199 on the Billboard 200 and number 9 on Independent Albums. Its two singles, "Stupid Kid" and "Private Eye", both charted on the UK Singles Chart, reaching number 53 and number 51, respectively. As of 2008, From Here to Infirmary has sold 175,000 copies in the United States, according to Nielsen SoundScan. NME listed the album as one of "20 Pop Punk Albums Which Will Make You Nostalgic". Cleveland.com ranked "Stupid Kid" at number 35 on their list of the top 100 pop-punk songs. Alternative Press ranked "Stupid Kid" at number 28 on their list of the best 100 singles from the 2000s.

== Track listing ==
No.	Title	Length
1.	"Private Eye"	3:30
2.	"Mr. Chainsaw"	3:05
3.	"Take Lots with Alcohol"	3:13
4.	"Stupid Kid"	2:23
5.	"Another Innocent Girl"	3:37
6.	"Steamer Trunk"	2:49
7.	"You're Dead"	3:50
8.	"Armageddon"	2:49
9.	"I'm Dying Tomorrow"	2:20
10.	"Bloodied Up"	2:51
11.	"Trucks and Trains"	3:16
12.	"Crawl"	4:25
Total length:		38:13

UK Exclusive Tracks

No.	Title	Length
13.	"Standard Break"	2:54
14.	"Hell Yes"	3:50
Total length:		44:57

== Personnel ==
Personnel per booklet.

Alkaline Trio

- Matt Skiba – guitar, vocals
- Dan Andriano – bass, vocals, piano
- Mike Felumlee – drums

Production

- Matt Allison – producer
- Alkaline Trio – producer, inside design
- Neil Weir – assistant producer
- Jerry Finn – mixing
- Laurent Bichara – assistant mixing
- Joby J. Ford – front cover, back design
- Matt Skiba – front cover, back design
- Heather Hannoura – inside design
- MaximumMac Studios – graphic production
- Jim Newberry – band photograph

== Charts ==
2001–2002 chart performance
Chart (2001–2002)	Peak position
Scottish Albums (Official Charts)	98
UK Albums (Official Charts)	95
UK Independent Albums (Official Charts)	8
US Billboard 200	199
US Heatseekers Albums (Billboard)	14
US Independent Albums (Billboard)	9

2021 chart performance
Chart (2021)	Peak position
Scottish Albums (Official Charts)	43
