= Goddamnit =

Studio album by Alkaline Trio
- Released: October 13, 1998
- Recorded: Summer 1998
- Studio: Atlas (Chicago)
- Genre: Punk rock; pop-punk; skate punk
- Length: 34:52
- Label: Asian Man
- Producer: Matt Allison, Alkaline Trio

Alkaline Trio chronology
For Your Lungs Only (1998)	Goddamnit (1998)	Maybe I'll Catch Fire (1999)

"Redux" version cover
- The cover of the 2008 "Redux" re-release.

Goddamnit is the debut album by American punk rock band Alkaline Trio, released October 13, 1998, through Asian Man Records.

== Artwork and title ==
The album cover has 3 red alarm clocks, each set at 6:00, representing 666. "I used to set my alarm clock when I was a bike messenger to 6 o'clock in the morning, and when the alarm clock would go off, the first word out of my mouth was always 'Goddamnit!'", says Matt Skiba.

== Reception ==
Professional ratings
Review scores
Source	Rating
AllMusic	4.5/5 stars
Sputnikmusic	5/5 stars
Tiny Mix Tapes	4/5 stars

As of 2008, Goddamnit has sold 94,000 copies in the United States, according to Nielsen SoundScan. Mike DaRonco of AllMusic called Goddamnit "hands down the perfect listening in the wake of a broken heart" and remarked that "It's rare that a band such as Alkaline Trio can make love songs appealing without being labeled as 'wimpy' or 'generic', and Goddamnit is the record to erase those labels."

== Track listing ==
All tracks are written by Matt Skiba, Dan Andriano, and Glenn Porter, except where noted.

No.	Title	Length
1.	"Cringe"	2:24
2.	"Cop"	2:18
3.	"San Francisco"	3:52
4.	"Nose over Tail" (Skiba, Rob Doran, Porter)	2:37
5.	"As You Were"	2:11
6.	"Enjoy Your Day"	2:17
7.	"Clavicle"	2:28
8.	"My Little Needle"	3:00
9.	"Southern Rock"	3:05
10.	"Message from Kathlene"	3:22
11.	"Trouble Breathing"	3:55
12.	"Sorry About That"	3:23
Total length:		34:52

"Redux" version bonus tracks
No.	Title	Writer(s)	Length
1.	"Weak Week" (demo)	Skiba, Doran, Porter	2:41
2.	"Nose over Tail" (demo)	Skiba, Doran, Porter	2:43
3.	"Ninety-Seven" (demo)	Skiba, Doran, Porter	4:49
4.	"Sundials" (demo)	Skiba, Doran, Porter	4:24
Total length:			49:29

== Personnel ==
- Matt Skiba – guitar, lead and backing vocals
- Dan Andriano – bass guitar, backing and lead vocals
- Glenn Porter – drums
- Rob Doran – bass guitar (on Redux version bonus tracks)
