= Good Mourning (album) =

Studio album by Alkaline Trio
- Released: May 13, 2003
- Recorded: November 2002–January 2003
- Studio: Cello
- Genres: Punk rock; horror punk; hardcore punk
- Length: 39:07
- Label: Vagrant
- Producers: Joe McGrath, Jerry Finn

Alkaline Trio chronology
| Alkaline Trio / Hot Water Music (2002) | Good Mourning (2003) | BYO Split Series Volume V (2004) |

Singles from Good Mourning
- 1. "We've Had Enough" Released: May 20, 2003; 2. "All on Black" Released: December 2, 2003

Good Mourning is the fourth studio album by American punk rock band Alkaline Trio, released May 13, 2003 on Vagrant Records.

== Background and production ==
Towards the end of May 2002, the band recorded their next album; they "decided that waiting until after Warped Tour would be too long." Recording sessions were held at Cello Studios with producers Joe McGrath and Jerry Finn. The album marks the first appearance of drummer Derek Grant, described by vocalist/guitarist Matt Skiba as "a whole new influence." During recording, both Skiba and vocalist/bassist Dan Andriano were ill. Alkaline Trio had planned a tour with One Man Army in early 2003, but the tour was cancelled due to Skiba having strained vocal cords; the album's recording was subsequently delayed. Brian Gardner mastered the recordings at Bern Grundman Mastering. Skiba describes the album as sounding "bigger, deeper and rawer" than its predecessor, From Here to Infirmary.

In a 2003 interview, Matt Skiba gave his thoughts on the album:

[Good Mourning] is pretty good. I mean it took us a long time to do and I think most of the people that I talk to that make records and stuff, there's always stuff that you wish you did better or maybe a little differently. I've never been able to avoid that, even with this. There's things that I wish I had done maybe a little differently. But that also comes with just listening to it and living with it for so long that until it's done you won't really hear things in that way until it's like too late I guess. But I would say for the most part that I'm really happy with it.

== Music and lyrics ==
Good Mourning has been described as a punk rock, pop-punk, and hardcore punk record, with a focus on aggression. Alternative Press stated that the album was simultaneously polished and raw, describing it as "scene music". Matt Skiba said the Ramones and the Damned served as big influences on the album. "We've Had Enough" features backing vocals from Keith Morris of Circle Jerks.

Discussing the title, Skiba said he was having breakfast near the studio, and his waiter said "'good morning' to me and it's just kinda like the double meaning/spelling kinda registered and I just called everyone and I was like, 'How about Good Mourning with a U?' and everybody liked it equally as much so we used it."

== Release ==
On January 23, 2003, the album's title was revealed as Good Mourning. On February 11, Good Mourning was announced for release in three months' time; alongside this, the album's track listing was posted online. On March 18, the album's artwork was revealed. Between April and June 2003, the band toured across the US and Canada, with One Man Army, Pretty Girls Make Graves, and Avoid One Thing. Good Mourning was made available for streaming on May 1, 2003, before being released through Vagrant Records on May 13. The UK version of the album included two bonus tracks: "Dead End Road" and "Old School Reasons". Also on May 13, the band appeared on Late Night with Conan O'Brien. "We've Had Enough" was released to radio on May 20; the song's music video was posted on MTV's website nine days later. In August and September, the band toured Europe as part of the Reconstruction Festival, and appeared at the Terremoto Festival. Following this, the band went on a tour of the UK with Hot Water Music. Between October and December, the band went on the Vagrant Tour 2003, which featured several acts on the label. The stint included appearances on IMX and Late Show with David Letterman. In February 2004, the band went on an Australian tour with Thrice and Hot Water Music. In March and April, the band toured the West Coast as part of the Punkvoter.

== Reception ==
Professional ratings
Aggregate scores
| Source | Rating |
|---|---|
| Metacritic | 79/100 |
Review scores
| Source | Rating |
| AbsolutePunk | Favorable |
| AllMusic | 4.5/5 stars |
| Blender | 3/5 stars |
| Drowned in Sound | 4/5 stars |
| LAS Magazine | Favorable |
| Melodic | 2/5 stars |
| Punknews.org | 3.5/5 stars |
| Rolling Stone | 3/5 stars |
| Spin | 8/10 |
| Tiny Mix Tapes | 2.5/5 stars |

The album debuted at number 20 on the Billboard 200, selling 40,000 copies on its first week of release. By August 2008, the album had sold 258,000 copies. Reception from critics was mixed to positive. Within the band, the retrospective reception of Good Mourning varies. When asked to rank Alkaline Trio's first eight studio albums, Dan Andriano put Good Mourning in the top spot whereas Matt Skiba ranked it second to last in place 7. Alternative Press ranked "We've Had Enough" at number 100 on their list of the best 100 singles from the 2000s.

== Track listing ==
=== Original release ===
All songs written and performed by Alkaline Trio.

| No. | Title | Length |
|---|---|---|
| 1. | "This Could Be Love" | 3:47 |
| 2. | "We've Had Enough" | 2:51 |
| 3. | "One Hundred Stories" | 3:40 |
| 4. | "Continental" | 3:28 |
| 5. | "All on Black" | 4:00 |
| 6. | "Emma" | 2:42 |
| 7. | "Fatally Yours" | 2:16 |
| 8. | "Every Thug Needs a Lady" | 3:18 |
| 9. | "Blue Carolina" | 3:28 |
| 10. | "Donner Party (All Night)" | 2:44 |
| 11. | "If We Never Go Inside" | 3:46 |
| 12. | "Blue in the Face" | 3:02 |

=== UK edition ===
Bonus tracks

13. "Dead End Road" – 3:09
14. "Old School Reasons" – 2:52

== Personnel ==
Personnel per booklet.

Alkaline Trio

- Matt Skiba – guitar, vocals
- Dan Andriano – bass, vocals
- Derek Grant – drums

Additional musicians

- Keith Morris – backing vocals
- Jerry Finn – backing vocals

Production

- Joe McGrath – producer, recording
- Jerry Finn – co-producer, mixing
- Christopher Holmes – assistant engineer
- Jason Gossman – assistant engineer
- Robert Reed – assistant engineer
- Mike Fasano – drum tech
- Brian Gardner – mastering
- Jay Blakesberg – photography
- Keath Moon – artwork, layout, design
- Alkaline Trio – layout, design

== Charts ==
2003 chart performance for Good Mourning
| Chart (2003) | Peak position |
|---|---|
| Canadian Albums (Nielsen SoundScan) | 77 |
| Scottish Albums (Official Charts) | 30 |
| UK Albums (Official Charts) | 32 |
| US Billboard 200 | 20 |
| US Independent Albums (Billboard) | 1 |

2026 chart performance for Good Mourning
| Chart (2026) | Peak position |
|---|---|
| UK Rock & Metal Albums (Official Charts) | 32 |
