= Maybe I'll Catch Fire =

Studio album by Alkaline Trio
- Released: March 14, 2000
- Recorded: October 1999
- Studios: Atlas, Chicago
- Genres: Punk rock; pop-punk
- Length: 35:15
- Label: Asian Man
- Producers: Matt Allison, Alkaline Trio

Alkaline Trio chronology
Goddamnit (1998)	Maybe I'll Catch Fire (2000)	Alkaline Trio (2000)

Maybe I'll Catch Fire is the second studio album by the American punk rock band Alkaline Trio, released on March 14, 2000, on Asian Man Records. Produced by Matt Allison, it was the band's final studio album with founding drummer Glenn Porter and their last album with Asian Man Records.

After recording the album, Porter was replaced by former Smoking Popes drummer Mike Felumlee, who made his stage debut in December 1999. The band promoted the album with an appearance on the 2000 Plea for Peace Tour in June and July of that year.

== Reception ==
Professional ratings
Review scores
Source	Rating
AllMusic	4/5 stars
Kerrang!	4/5 stars
Ox-Fanzine	Favorable
Pitchfork Media	3.2/10

By August 2008, the album sold 85,000 copies.

Mike DaRonco of Allmusic liked the album, but less than the band's previous effort, 1998's Goddamnit, saying that "Lyrically, Maybe I'll Catch Fire follows in the footsteps of Goddamnit, while staying true to the elaborate but emotional tone of aggressive pop-punk. Not as essential as the Trio's previous efforts, but it would be difficult for any band to follow up an album like Goddamnit".

== Track listing ==
All tracks are written by Matt Skiba, Dan Andriano, and Glenn Porter.

No.	Title	Length
1.	"Keep 'Em Coming"	4:10
2.	"Madam Me"	2:59
3.	"You've Got So Far to Go"	3:14
4.	"Fuck You Aurora"	4:49
5.	"Sleepyhead"	3:56
6.	"Maybe I'll Catch Fire"	3:07
7.	"Tuck Me In"	2:39
8.	"She Took Him to the Lake"	2:40
9.	"5-3-10-4"	2:56
10.	"Radio"	4:41
Total length:		35:16

== Personnel ==
Alkaline Trio

- Matt Skiba – guitar, vocals
- Dan Andriano – bass, vocals
- Glenn Porter – drums

Artwork

- Craig Ackerman – Layout Design
- Brian Case – Layout Design
- Heather Han – Photography

Production

- Matt Allison – Producer, engineer
- John Golden – Mastering
