= Derek Grant (drummer) =

American musician

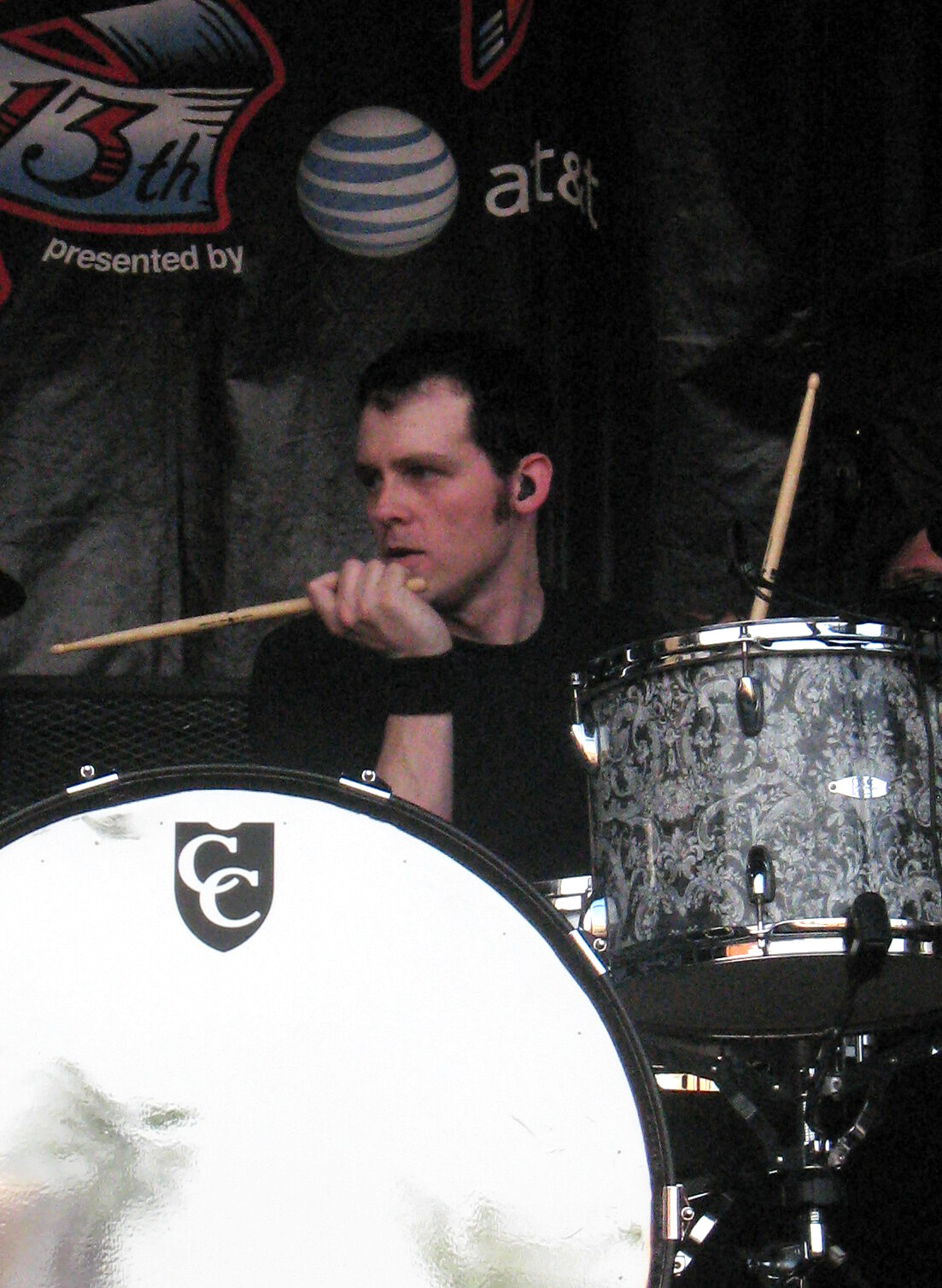
- Grant performing in 2007

Background information
- Genres: Punk rock; alternative rock; hardcore punk; ska punk; metalcore
- Occupation: Musician
- Instruments: Drums; guitar; vocals
- Years active: 1992–present
- Formerly of: The Suicide Machines; The Vandals; Walls of Jericho; Alkaline Trio; Thoughts of Ionesco; Dead Ending; Telegraph

Derek Grant (sometimes known as Derek R. Grant) is an American musician who was the drummer for punk rock band Alkaline Trio from 2001 to 2023. He is also a member of Chicago "supergroup" Dead Ending. He was previously a member of The Suicide Machines, Telegraph, Gyga, Thoughts of Ionesco, Remainder, Walls of Jericho, The Exceptions and Broken Spoke. In addition to playing the drums, Grant is a guitarist and vocalist, and has filled in as guitarist for both Face to Face (1998) and The Gaslight Anthem (October 2008).

== Career ==
He has frequently filled in on drums for Josh Freese on many Vandals Tours since 1998, and with Good Charlotte during the later half of 2004.

In September 2008, Grant released an 8-song album free via his MySpace page entitled D.Grant Meets the Reaper which is a collaboration with his 12-year-old alter ego. The songs were written between the ages of 11–14, and feature Grant at age 12 on vocals, with newly re-recorded music.

In February 2009, Grant released a three-song EP free via his Myspace page entitled The Purple Trilogy. This material, recorded by Grant (with help from Saves the Day guitarist Arun Bali) is described as "Electro-Funk" and features a cover of an unreleased Prince track ("Electric Intercourse"), and two original compositions.

In October 2014, he released a digital single for "Love is a Bad Dream", a track from his solo album Break Down, followed by the non-album track "Don't Marry Me". In January 2015, the album was released through Red Scare Industries. It contains eight songs written and recorded between 2008 and 2009, with all instruments played by Grant himself.

In May 2015, he released a 7-inch with Australian singer-songwriter Dan Cribb, through Pee Records. The physical release contained two songs each, with an additional one-song each released digitally. It was mixed by The Swellers frontman Nick Diener at Oneder Studios in Michigan who also played bass and guitar and sung on Dan's songs. In 2017, Grant reunited with Detroit post-hardcore band Thoughts of Ionesco to record an EP, Skar Cymbals. The band also performed their first concert in over seventeen years in Detroit, MI.

In June 2023, Grant announced his departure from Alkaline Trio, citing mental health and a desire to pursue production and graphic design as factors. Though he was replaced by drummer Atom Willard following his announcement, his final appearance was on the band's 2024 album Blood, Hair, and Eyeballs, having completed his drumming duties before his departure.

== Discography ==
=== Solo ===
- Breakdown (2015)
- Derek Grant / Dan Cribb Split (2015)

=== With The Suicide Machines ===
- Destruction by Definition (1996)
- Battle Hymns (1998)

=== With Gyga ===
- Black EP (1998)

=== With Thoughts of Ionesco ===
- A Skin Historic (1999)
- Skar Cymbals EP (2017)

=== With Alkaline Trio ===
- Good Mourning (2003)
- Crimson (2005)
- Remains (2007)
- Agony and Irony (2008)
- This Addiction (2010)
- Damnesia (2011)
- My Shame Is True (2013)
- Is This Thing Cursed? (2018)
- Blood, Hair, and Eyeballs (2024)

=== With Dead Ending ===
- Dead Ending EP (2012)
- DE II EP (2012)
- DE III EP (2014)
- Shoot The Messenger (2017)
