= Matt Skiba =

American punk rock musician (born 1976)

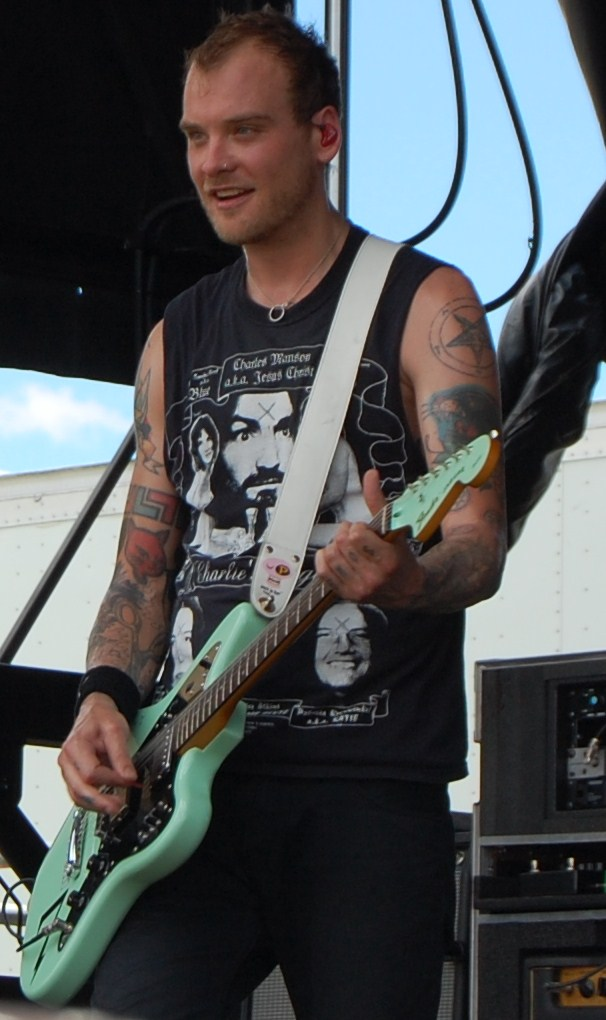
- Skiba performing at Warped Tour in 2010

Background information
- Born: Matthew Thomas Skiba; February 24, 1976 (age 50); Chicago, Illinois, U.S.
- Origin: McHenry, Illinois, U.S.
- Genres: Punk rock; pop punk; emo; alternative rock
- Occupations: Musician; songwriter
- Instruments: Guitar; vocals; piano
- Years active: 1992–present
- Member of: Alkaline Trio; Lektron
- Formerly of: Blink-182; Heavens; the Hell; Matt Skiba and the Sekrets

Matthew Thomas Skiba (born February 24, 1976) is an American musician and songwriter best known as the co-lead vocalist and guitarist of the punk rock band Alkaline Trio. He also served as the co-lead vocalist and guitarist of Blink-182 from 2015 to 2022. Skiba's lyrical content commonly involves dark romantic themes.

Alkaline Trio formed in 1996 with Skiba as the frontman. Since then, the band has released ten full-length albums over two decades. Skiba also recorded albums with side projects including Heavens and theHELL, as well as two full-length solo albums with his backing band, the Sekrets. Most recently Skiba also played in a garage-punk supergroup named Lektron in 2023.

Following Tom DeLonge's second departure from Blink-182 in early 2015, Skiba was brought on to fill in for three shows and was later made a full-time member. He recorded two albums with the band, California (2016) and Nine (2019), before DeLonge returned in 2022.

== Early life and family ==
Matthew Thomas Skiba was born on February 24, 1976, in Chicago, Illinois, and grew up in McHenry, Illinois. He began playing piano and drums at an early age. His first concert was Public Image Ltd. After high school, Skiba was interested in graphic design but dropped out of art school after one year. In 1996, while working as a bike messenger delivering beepers, he decided to switch from drums to guitar. Prior to that he played in bands including Blunt, Jerkwater, and the Traitors.

Skiba has two sisters, Lynsay and Courtney, and is of Ukrainian descent. His mother, Joan Skiba, served as an emergency room nurse for the United States Army Nurse Corps during the Vietnam War, and later became an elementary school teacher after spending two decades in emergency medicine. His father, Thomas Skiba (1942–2022), also served in Vietnam for the United States Army Dental Corps. He later opened private practices as an oral surgeon in the Chicago area and became a professor of dentistry at the University of Illinois Chicago.

== Career ==
=== Alkaline Trio ===
Skiba studied design at Chicago's Columbia College but left in 1996 to form Alkaline Trio with drummer Glenn Porter and bassist Rob Doran.

After the group recorded their demo and the single "Sundials", they recorded the For Your Lungs Only EP, during which Doran left the group. Dan Andriano joined and played bass on the EP. The band released their debut full-length Goddamnit on Asian Man Records in 1998, followed by Maybe I'll Catch Fire and the compilation Alkaline Trio in 2000.

The group's lineup changed again in 2000 when Porter left and former Smoking Popes drummer Mike Felumlee joined. From Here to Infirmary, released by Vagrant Records in the spring of 2001. In 2002 Jade Tree Records released a Hot Water Music/Alkaline Trio split EP which was well received. Both bands contributed original tracks and covers of each other's songs. Good Mourning followed in 2003, marking the band's first album with drummer Derek Grant, formerly of Suicide Machines and Thoughts of Ionesco. While recording Good Mourning, Skiba suffered from vocal problems due to acid reflux, lack of vocal warmups, and earlier use of alcohol and drugs.

Following a tour and throat surgery, the band recorded and released Crimson in 2005 and the compilation Remains in 2007. Agony & Irony, their first and only record on Epic Records, was released in July 2008. In January 2010 they released This Addiction on their own Heart & Skull label in partnership with Epitaph Records. In July 2011, they released a semi-acoustic LP called Damnesia to commemorate 15 years as a band. Their eighth album, My Shame Is True was released on April 21, 2013.

In 2014, the band underwent an anthology tour known as the "Past Live Tour", in which they performed their first eight studio albums in their entirety across four dates. Following a five-year hiatus from the studio and a second throat surgery for Skiba, the band released their ninth album, Is This Thing Cursed?, on August 31, 2018. The band released an EP titled E.P. on March 19, 2020. The band's tenth studio album, Blood, Hair, and Eyeballs, came out on January 26, 2024.

=== Blink-182 ===
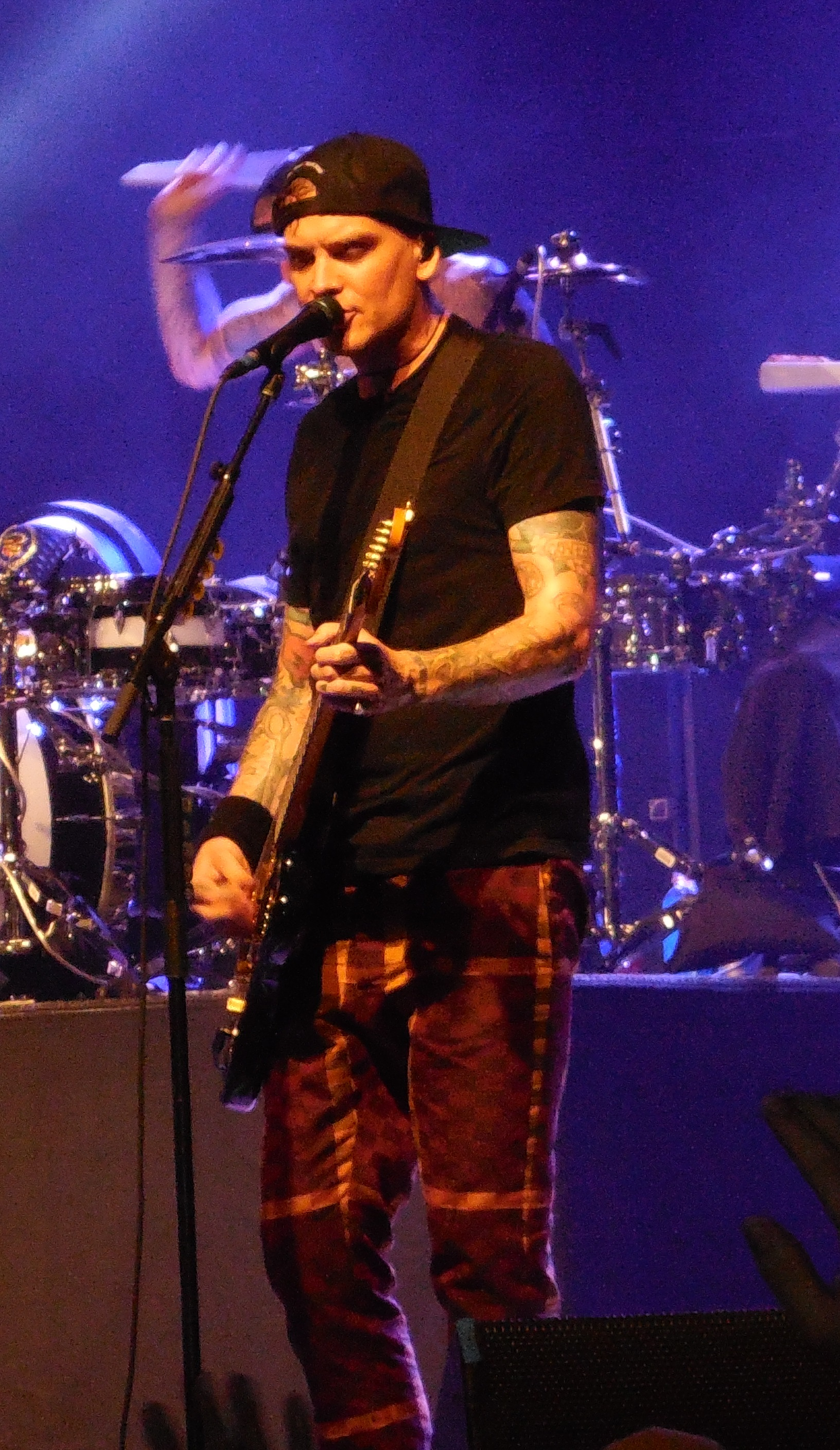
Skiba performing with Blink-182 in 2015 at the Musink Festival

Following the departure of Tom DeLonge from Blink-182 in 2015, Mark Hoppus announced that Skiba would "fill in" for the band and performed two club shows and a slot at the Musink festival in March 2015. Later that year, the band confirmed that Skiba was now an official member and would be appearing on their upcoming album. The resulting album California, was released on July 1, 2016. Skiba reappeared on the band's eighth studio album Nine, which was released on September 20, 2019. However, he did not appear on the band's 2020 single "Quarantine", due to lack of a proper home recording studio.

In July 2022, Skiba stated in an Instagram comment reply that his status with Blink-182 was uncertain while also saying that he was grateful for his time in the group. In October 2022, Blink-182 announced that DeLonge had officially returned to the band. Skiba was absent in promotional material, effectively confirming his departure. DeLonge messaged Skiba on Instagram to thank him for his time with the band, and later shared the post publicly on his account. Skiba himself reposted some of the promotional material of the new single on his Instagram account, congratulated the band for the reunion of their classic line up and stated his gratitude for his time in the band. On February 13, 2025, Skiba joined his former band on stage to perform "Bored to Death" alongside Tom DeLonge during a benefit show in the Los Angeles' Hollywood Palladium to help Los Angeles wildfire relief efforts with Alkaline Trio as supporting act. Skiba would later join the band on stage occasionally during the Missionary Impossible tour.

=== Side projects and solo ===
In 2001, he began his first full solo tour with The Plea for Peace Tour, consisting mostly of acoustic versions of Alkaline Trio songs with backing drums and bass in a few shows.

His first solo release came in 2002 in the form of a split with Kevin Seconds of 7 Seconds fame. The songs were mostly acoustic with drums, bass, and piano played by Skiba. Alkaline Trio still occasionally performs the song "Good Fucking Bye".

In 2005, Skiba contributed the song "Demons Away" to the Fat Wreck Chords' compilation Protect: A Benefit for the National Association to Protect Children.

In 2006, Skiba launched the band Heavens with F-Minus bassist Josiah Steinbrick. The group released Patent Pending on September 12, 2006.

Also in 2006, Skiba contributed to the track "Rock 'n' Roll High School" featured on Brats on the Beat: Ramones for Kids, a tribute album released on Go-Kart Records.

In May 2007, Skiba performed five shows with Chuck Ragan of Hot Water Music.

In late December 2008, Steinbrick announced on Heavens' MySpace page, "This is no longer a Heavens page. Sorry, that's just the way it's going down. Matt will still be doing Trio stuff and last I heard he might be working on a wonderful solo record. I'm not really positive actually but I'm sure it will be great." A falling-out between Skiba and Steinbrick led to the breakup.

On August 18, 2009, at Debonair Social Club in Chicago, Skiba, Grant and Greg Corner and Jonny Radtke of Kill Hannah debuted the supergroup cover band Them Crooked Vulvas (and occasionally played under the name A Perfect Circus).

On August 10, 2010, he released a solo album titled Demos on Asian Man Records. The album is said to be a precursor to a future Alkaline Trio album .

In January 2012, Skiba released an EP along with former Angels and Airwaves and The Offspring drummer Atom Willard under the moniker The Hell. The Hell's debut EP is entitled Sauve Les Requins.

Skiba's second full-length solo album, Babylon, was released on May 8, 2012. The album features Skiba leading a band called Matt Skiba and the Sekrets; the backing band includes AFI bassist Hunter Burgan, and My Chemical Romance's touring drummer Jarrod Alexander. "Voices" impacted radio on May 1, 2012.

In early 2013, Matt Skiba encouraged Mike Park of Asian Man Records to release The Smith Street Band's first two albums in America. Skiba had met the band's guitarist Lee Hartney and fallen in love with his personality and tones. Blink 182 and The Smith Street Band played together in 2017 at Hurricane Festival in Germany.

Skiba confirms his current work on a solo record, a screenplay, and a children's punk record featuring Mark Hoppus.

In March 2015, Skiba and the Sekrets' second album, Kutz, was announced for a release date of June 1.

In May 2023, Skiba released new music with a band called Lektron, returning to Asian Man Records.

Skiba was an "early collaborator" with the band Unborn Ghost, which released an album in 2023.

== Equipment ==
=== Guitars ===
Although he started out as an avid player of Gibson Les Pauls, Skiba currently plays Fender Jaguar HH's. He has also played Gibson Les Paul Juniors, Gibson SGs, Fender Stratocasters and Fender Jazzmasters in the past.

He has had two signature instruments made:

- GPC released a limited run of Matt Skiba Signature guitars (with the Jaguar body shape), with 200 being manufactured.
- Fender released a signature acoustic guitar dubbed the Malibu, which was featured on the cover of Alkaline Trio's acoustic album Damnesia

=== Amps ===
- Diezel VH4
- Bogner Shiva
- Orange Rockerverb 100
- Fender Supersonic 22
- Kemper Profiler

Skiba used a Kemper Profiler while in the studio with blink-182 and John Feldmann.

Along with his own amps, the profiled sounds that were used include:

- Friedman BE-100
- Hughes & Kettner Statesman
- Vox AC15
- Silvertone 1471

== Personal life ==
Skiba is a vegan and practices Transcendental Meditation according to an interview with AOL Interface. He said that the clear and calm state of mind it provides has greatly helped his creative process, though initially he believed the "tortured soul" mindset was more beneficial. The book Catching the Big Fish by David Lynch caused him to change his mind and he now believes a calm state is more artistically helpful. Skiba purchased a membership in the Church of Satan organization in the early days of Alkaline Trio, saying, "to me Anton LaVey was...very punk rock".

Skiba moved to the San Francisco Bay Area in 2001, though he currently lives in Los Angeles. He has "Love Song" tattooed on his knuckles. He is a "big Cure fan," a "huge Damned fan," "an enormous David Lynch fan", a "big Green Day fan" and a "really big Nirvana fan." Skiba is divorced. He is a close friend of NOFX frontman Fat Mike, and served as the best man at his wedding.

As of 2014, Skiba stated that he is sober, and no longer drinks alcohol.

== Discography ==
=== Solo ===
- Matt Skiba / Kevin Seconds (2002)
- Demos (2010)

=== With Alkaline Trio ===
- Goddamnit (1998)
- Maybe I'll Catch Fire (2000)
- Alkaline Trio (2000)
- From Here to Infirmary (2001)
- Good Mourning (2003)
- Crimson (2005)
- Remains (2007)
- Agony and Irony (2008)
- This Addiction (2010)
- Damnesia (2011)
- My Shame Is True (2013)
- Is This Thing Cursed? (2018)
- E.P. (2020)
- Blood, Hair, and Eyeballs (2024)

=== With Blink-182 ===
- California (2016)
- Nine (2019)

=== With Heavens ===
- Patent Pending (2006)

=== With the Sekrets ===
- Babylon (2012)
- Haven't You? EP (2012)
- Kuts (2015)

=== With theHELL ===
- Sauve Les Requins (2012)
- Southern Medicine (2013)

=== With Lektron ===
- Lektron (single) (2023)

=== Guest appearances ===
- New Found Glory – "Forget My Name" on Sticks and Stones
- Avoid One Thing – "Pop Punk Band"
- Atari Star – "Winter Birthmark"
- Say Anything – "About Falling" on In Defense of the Genre
- H_{2}O – "What Happened?" on Nothing to Prove
- Common Rider – backup vocals on This is Unity Music
- Chuck Ragan – "The Boat" on Feast or Famine, "Do What You Do" on Feast or Famine
- Ashes Divide – "The Prey" on Keep Telling Myself It's Alright
- Rise Against – "Hairline Fracture" on Appeal to Reason, "Midnight Hands" on Endgame
- Laura Jane Grace – "Amputations" on Heart Burns
- Jeffree Star – "Louis Vuitton Body Bag" on Beauty Killer
- William Control – "Deathclub" on Underworld: Rise of the Lycans
- Kill Hannah – "Promise Me" on Wake Up the Sleepers
- The Bouncing Souls – "Hybrid Moments" on Complete Control Recording Sessions
- Dave Hause – "Benediction" on Devour
- Teenage Time Killers – "Barrio" on Greatest Hits Vol. 1
- Andy Black – "Stay Alive" on The Shadow Side
- Steve Aoki – "Why Are We So Broken" on Neon Future III
- Yellowcard - "Love Letters Lost" on Better Days
