= Hurricane season =

Hurricane season may refer to:

- Atlantic hurricane season
- Pacific hurricane season
- Hurricane Season (novel), 2017 novel by Mexican writer Fernanda Melchor
- Hurricane Season (2023 film), Mexican film by Elisa Miller based on Fernanda Melchor's novel of the same name
- Hurricane Season (2009 film), American film by Tim Story
- Hurricane Season (album), 2011 album by Dan Andriano
- Hurricane Season: Walking on Dead Fish, 2008 documentary film about football in the wake of Katrina directed by Franklin Martin
- Hurricane Season: A Coach, His Team, and Their Triumph in the Time of Katrina, 2007 book by author Neal Thompson about a football team's success after Hurricane Katrina
- List of Carolina Hurricanes seasons, in ice hockey
- Sports years of various sports of the Miami Hurricanes of the University of Miami
