= I Wanna Be a Warhol =

Single by Alkaline Trio

from the album My Shame Is True
- Released: February 5, 2013
- Recorded: October 2012
- Studio: The Blasting Room, Fort Collins, Colorado
- Genre: Punk rock
- Length: 3:07
- Label: Heart & Skull; Epitaph
- Songwriters: Matt Skiba; Dan Andriano; Derek Grant
- Producers: Bill Stevenson; Jason Livermore

Alkaline Trio singles chronology
"This Addiction" (2010)	"I Wanna Be a Warhol" (2013)	"Blackbird" (2018)

"I Wanna Be a Warhol" is a song by the Chicago-based punk rock band Alkaline Trio, released as the first single from their 2013 album My Shame Is True on February 5, 2013. A music video for the song was released on March 8, 2013, and it features the actress Milla Jovovich. The song impacted radio on March 12, 2013.

== Personnel ==
=== Band ===
- Matt Skiba – guitar, lead vocals
- Dan Andriano – bass, backing vocals
- Derek Grant – drums

=== Guest ===
- Brendan Kelly - backing vocals
