= Bad Time (Alkaline Trio song) =

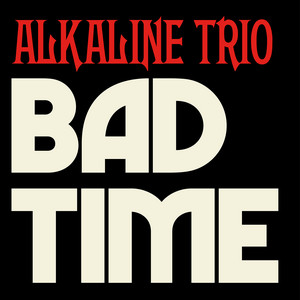

Single by Alkaline Trio

from the album Blood, Hair, and Eyeballs
- Released: November 30, 2023
- Length: 2:55
- Label: Rise
- Songwriters: Matt Skiba; Dan Andriano; Derek Grant
- Producer: Cameron Webb

Alkaline Trio singles chronology
"Blood, Hair, and Eyeballs" (2023)	"Bad Time" (2023)	"Versions of You" (2024)

"Bad Time" is a song by American rock band Alkaline Trio. It was released on November 30, 2023, as the second single from their tenth album, Blood, Hair, and Eyeballs. The song was written by Matt Skiba, Dan Andriano, and Derek Grant.

== Background ==
"Bad Time" was mainly inspired by two life-threatening situations that Alkaline Trio guitarist Matt Skiba had been involved in during his life, and the comfort that he was given through hearing the voice of a loved one.

In 2019, Skiba was also the guitarist for Blink-182 and had stopped in El Paso, Texas for a show when a mass shooting occurred at a nearby Walmart the day before. The band was locked down in their hotel room shortly after being notified of the situation when Skiba received a phone call from a friend and crush. Skiba explained, "We could hear gunshots and sirens as the situation escalated. My friend asked if it was a bad time to talk, and I said no – I really wanted to speak with her. It was actually a terrible and terrifying time, but it was never a bad time to hear her voice."

Skiba also recounted a similar situation from earlier in his life when writing "Bad Time." While still living in Chicago, he and his roommate were in the crossfire of a drive-by shooting. Skiba recounted the events while writing the song and thought about how helpful it would've been to hear his friend's voice back then.

== Release ==
"Bad Time" released on November 30, 2023, alongside the song's music video. Earlier that year, drummer Derek Grant departed from the group to focus on his mental health, so the video features new drummer, Atom Willard in his place. The video was directed by Ravi Dahr, who previously directed the video for their previous single “Blood, Hair, and Eyeballs.” Skiba told Soundsphere,

Working again with Ravi and his beautiful team has been a lot of work but even more fun. We spent the short time we had to put this together, brainstorming and sending links, photos, and film references. It's not every day I meet someone who loves Dario Argento or Stanley Kubrick or Kenneth Anger and so on as much as I do. Ravi did all the actual, real work on this thing, but I love being involved and hope that I helped to paint this beautiful picture.

== Personnel ==
=== Alkaline Trio ===
- Matt Skiba – guitar, lead vocals, songwriting
- Dan Andriano – bass, backing vocals, songwriting
- Derek Grant – drums, songwriting

=== Additional musicians ===
- Jamie Blake – background vocals

=== Production ===
- Cameron Webb – production, mixing
- Andrew Alekel – engineering
