= Broken Wing (EP) =

EP by Alkaline Trio
- Released: April 2, 2013
- Recorded: October 2012 at The Blasting Room, Fort Collins, Colorado
- Genre: Punk rock
- Length: 13:18
- Label: Heart & Skull / Epitaph
- Producer: Bill Stevenson, Jason Livermore

Alkaline Trio chronology
Damnesia (2011)	Broken Wing (2013)	My Shame Is True (2013)

Broken Wing is an EP by American punk rock band Alkaline Trio, released on April 2, 2013 on Epitaph and Heart & Skull. Produced by both Bill Stevenson and Jason Livermore, Broken Wing was recorded during the same sessions that yielded the band's eighth studio album, My Shame Is True, and consists of songs that were written for the album but didn't fit the album's theme of catharsis.

Digital deluxe versions of My Shame Is True include all four songs from Broken Wing as bonus tracks.

== Track listing ==
All tracks are written by Matt Skiba, Dan Andriano, and Derek Grant.

Side A
No.	Title	Length
1.	"Balanced on a Shelf"	4:06
2.	"Pocket Knife"	2:43

Side B
No.	Title	Length
1.	"Broken Wing"	3:28
2.	"Sun Burns"	3:41
Total length:		13:18

== Personnel ==
=== Alkaline Trio ===
- Matt Skiba – guitar, backing & lead vocals
- Dan Andriano – bass, lead & backing vocals
- Derek Grant – drums

=== Additional musicians ===
- Bill Stevenson - backing vocals

=== Recording personnel ===
- Bill Stevenson - producer, engineer
- Jason Livermore - producer, engineer, mixing, mastering
- Andrew Berlin - engineer
- Chris Beeble - engineer

=== Artwork ===
- Nick Pritchard - design
- Monkeybird - album photography
