= The Damned Things =

American rock band

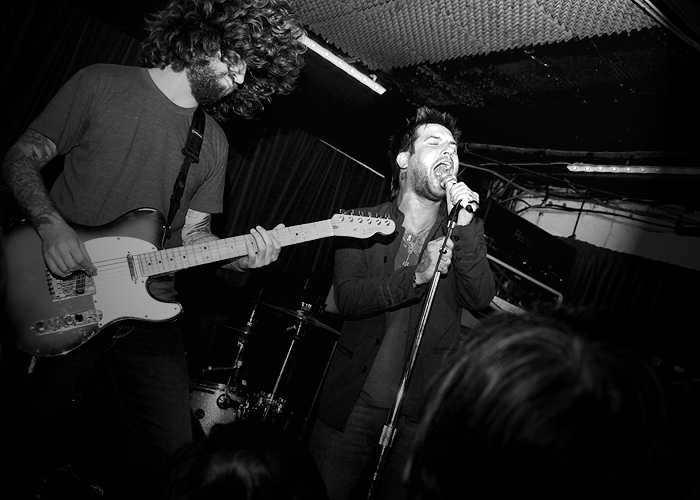
- Joe Trohman (left) and Keith Buckley performing with the Damned Things in 2010

Background information
- Origin: New York, U.S.
- Genres: Hard rock; heavy metal
- Years active: 2009–2012; 2016–2019
- Labels: Nuclear Blast; Mercury
- Spinoff of: Fall Out Boy; Anthrax; Every Time I Die; Alkaline Trio
- Past members: Scott Ian; Joe Trohman; Keith Buckley; Andy Hurley; Dan Andriano; Rob Caggiano; Josh Newton
- Website: thedamnedthings.com

The Damned Things were an American rock supergroup most recently consisting of Fall Out Boy's Joe Trohman and Andy Hurley, Anthrax's Scott Ian, Every Time I Die's Keith Buckley, and Alkaline Trio's Dan Andriano. The band's name is inspired by the lyrics in Ram Jam's 1977 version of "Black Betty".

== History ==
In 2008, Joe Trohman and Scott Ian met and began writing music together, while Ian was on a break from making music with Anthrax. They invited Keith Buckley, Rob Caggiano and Andy Hurley to join the burgeoning project the following year. The band eventually played its first show at the Knitting Factory in Brooklyn, New York, on June 1, 2010, and their first UK show in London at Heaven on June 10. They also played on the second stage at the Download Festival on June 13, 2010, and on the Helvíti stage at the Copenhell Festival on June 12, 2010. The first single, "We've Got a Situation Here", was released on iTunes on October 25, 2010. The songs "Ironiclast" and "We've Got a Situation Here" were released together as a 7" vinyl and CD single on November 26, 2010, through Metal Club stores. On October 21, 2010, the band released the song "Friday Night (Going Down In Flames)" via their Facebook and Myspace, as well as their first album's artwork.

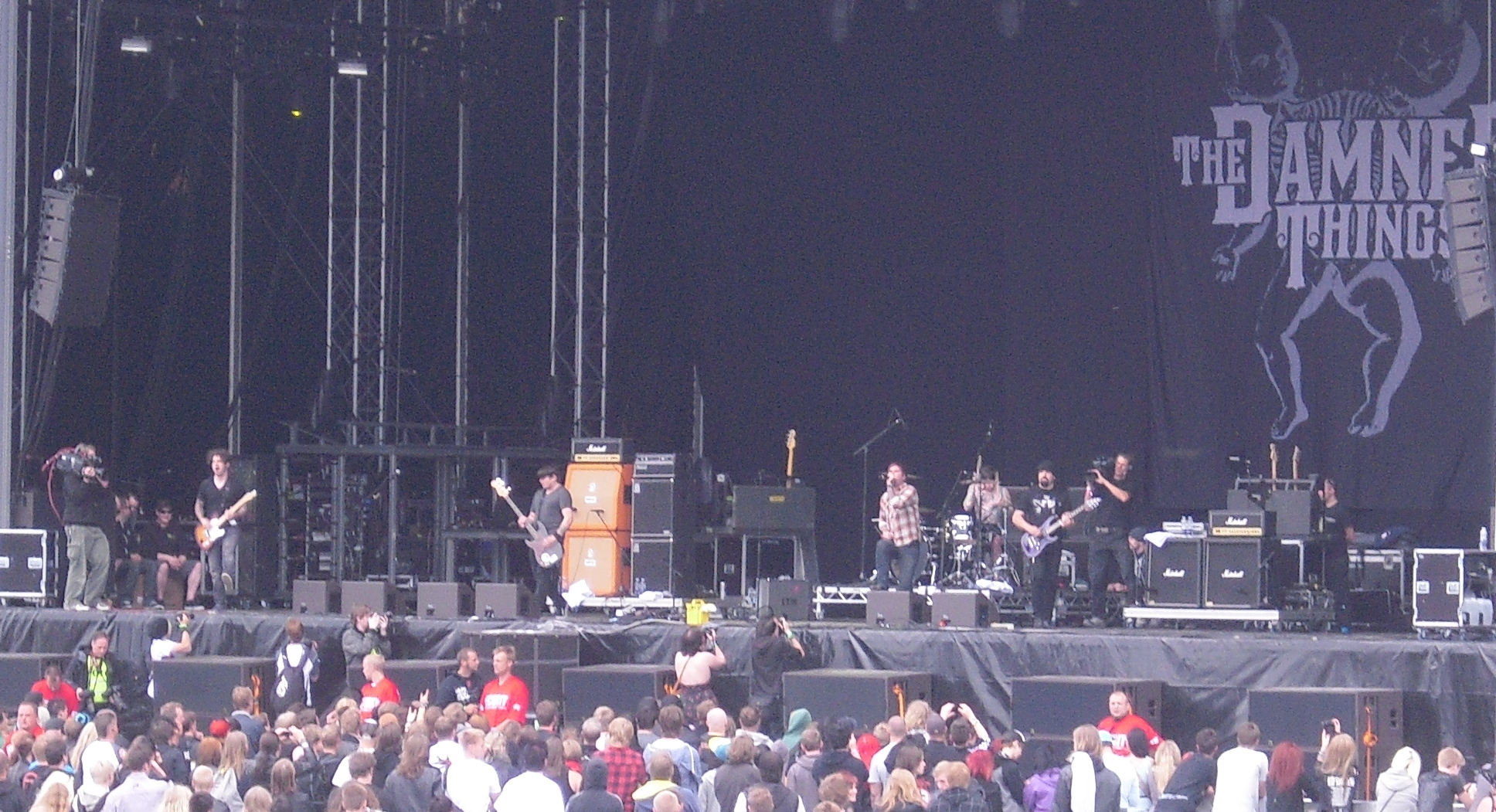
The Damned Things performing live at Metaltown Festival in June 2011

On November 29, 2010, the band released the song "Little Darling" for free streaming through AbsolutePunk.net. The band's first album, Ironiclast was released on December 14, 2010, through Island Records. Trohman has mentioned that for the album, the band was aiming for a blues- and riff-oriented heavy/classic rock sound, and combining elements from their own bands, going for a traditional hard rock sound combined with the heavier aspects of Anthrax and Every Time I Die and the hook-laden choruses of Fall Out Boy. Trohman has mentioned such bands as Thin Lizzy and Led Zeppelin as having influences on the record. In an interview in December 2010, Trohman confirmed that Josh Newton (formerly of Every Time I Die and From Autumn to Ashes) had joined the band as a full-time bass guitarist.

In 2011, the band played the Download Festival and Hellfest 2011, and released a second single, "Friday Night (Going Down In Flames)". They were scheduled to also play the Australian Soundwave Revolution festival in September–October 2011, but the festival was cancelled and in its place the band played on the Australian Counter-Revolution mini-festival.

A previously unreleased song by the band, "Trophy Widow", was released on the soundtrack of the video game Batman: Arkham City on October 4, 2011, while the game was released two weeks later, on October 18.

In August 2018, during his co-host duties on the Wall of Sound: Up Against The Wall podcast, Scott Ian confirmed new music was on the way after stating "we're all friends and we're all in contact with each other on a regular basis, and I can say that there is, possibly, a record, but that's all I'm gonna say about it."

The band announced they would be playing the Welcome To Rockville festival in May 2019.

On February 20, 2019, the band posted a new lineup photo on their social media pages, which included Alkaline Trio's Dan Andriano in place of Rob Caggiano and Josh Newton. On February 21, the band released the first single from their forthcoming album High Crimes called "Cells". The band released their second album High Crimes on April 26, 2019, through Nuclear Blast. Loudwire later named it one of the 50 best rock albums of 2019. The band played their final show to date on December 13, 2019, at Every Time I Die's annual mini-festival 'Tid The Season.

== Band members ==
=== Final line-up ===
- Keith Buckley – lead vocals (2009–2012, 2016–2019)
- Joe Trohman – lead guitar, backing vocals (2009–2012, 2016–2019), rhythm guitar (2010–2012)
- Scott Ian – rhythm guitar, backing vocals (2009–2012, 2016–2019)
- Andy Hurley – drums (2009–2012, 2016–2019)
- Dan Andriano – bass, backing vocals (2019)

=== Former members ===
- Rob Caggiano – lead guitar (2010–2012), backing vocals (2009–2012), bass (2009–2010)
- Josh Newton – bass (2010–2012, 2016-2019)

== Discography ==
Studio albums

Year	Album details	Peak chart positions			
Year	Album details	US	US Heat.	US Rock	US Hard Rock
2010	Ironiclast: Released: December 14, 2010; Label: Mercury; Formats: CD, DD	–	1	32	10
2019	High Crimes: Released: April 26, 2019; Label: Nuclear Blast; Formats: CD, DD, Vinyl (Limited Edition)	–	6	–	–

Singles

Year	Title	Peak Positions	Album
Year	Title	U.S. Main.	Album
2010	"We've Got a Situation Here"	25	Ironiclast
2011	"Friday Night (Going Down in Flames)"	–	Ironiclast
2019	"Cells"	–	High Crimes
2019	"Something Good"	–	High Crimes

Music videos

Year	Song	Album	Director(s)
2010	"We've Got a Situation Here"	Ironiclast	Brendon Small
2019	"Cells"	High Crimes	Brandon Dermer
2019	"Something Good"	High Crimes	Kris Baldwin
