= Jamie Blake =

American singer-songwriter

Jamie Blake (born c. 1975) is an American singer-songwriter.

Blake grew up in Chicago before moving to Washington DC in 1993, where she attended The American University. She left for New York in 1994 to complete her studies at NYU's Gallatin School of Individualized Study. She was signed by A&M Records in 1996. Her self-titled debut album Jamie Blake, was released in August 1997. It was produced by Sean Slade and Paul Kolderie and mixed by Bob Clearmountain. She made a special guest appearance as herself on the television show "Beverly Hills 90210". Songs from that album appeared on the television show Gossip Girl in 2009.

In 2000 she created an album for Geffen Records as part of the duo "vixtrola"; Songs from the album have appeared in the movie Darkness Falls and various television shows. She has worked alongside Jeff Buckley, Tricky, Ric Ocasek (The Cars), Josh Freese (A Perfect Circle, The Vandals & Nine Inch Nails), and Danny Lohner (Nine Inch Nails, David Bowie & Marilyn Manson). She is thanked by the Scissor Sisters on their debut album.

Starting in 2008 she became an on again off again collaborator with The Rentals performing guest spots on various recordings.

Blake is the credited composer on the film "Boutonniere", which made its debut at the 2009 Sundance Film Festival.

In 2010 she collaborated with a select group of artists on the movie soundtrack for "9191" including Hesta Prynn, Dave Lombardo (Slayer), Oliver Ackermann of A Place To Bury Strangers, Mike Conte of Early Man and snowboarder Jamie Lynn which won the ESPN Snowboard Picture Awards for Best Soundtrack as well as Best Soundtrack at the Summit Action Sports Film Festival.

In 2011, Jamie co-wrote and performed the song "Souls," with Japanese Alt Rock band the HIATUS. She also contributed vocals to the track "On Your Way Home." Both appear on their third album entitled "A World Of Pandemonium." She appears on two Live DVD releases with the HIATUS adding vocals to "Souls," "On Your Way Home," "Flyleaf" and "The Flare, " and guested on the band's live at Budokan taping, performing the songs "Souls" and "Tales of Sorrow Street." She also appears in the 2022 documentary ELLEGARDEN: Lost & Found.

In 2024 Blake contributed background vocals to Alkaline Trio's tenth album, Blood, Hair, and Eyeballs, it was released on January 26, 2024.

== Discography ==
- Jamie Blake, A&M records, 1997
- Vixtrola, Geffen Records, 2000
- Volcom - 9191 - The Gigi Ruf Movie - (Original Soundtrack), indie, 2010
- The Hiatus - A World Of Pandemonium - (Track4. Souls and track 10. On Your Way Home), 2011
- The Hiatus - The Afterglow - A World Of Pandemonium DVD - (Souls, On Your Way Home, Fly Leaf and The Flare), 2012
- The Hiatus - The Afterglow Tour - Live DVD - (Souls, On Your Way Home, The Flare), 2013
- The Rentals - Songs About Time, The Rentals, 2009
- Alkaline Trio - Blood, Hair, and Eyeballs, Rise Records, 2024

== Track listing ==
1. Coming Down 2:54/ 2. Runaway 3:11/ 3. Whisper Too Loud 4:21/ 4. So Precious 4:33/ 5. Yell 4:17/ 6. What You Say 2:55/ 7. You Asked Me/ 8. Dragstrip Girl 2:26/ 9. When We're Dumb 3:42/ 10. Things I Could've Said 5:08/ 11. The Worst is Over 3:25
