= High Crimes (album) =

Studio album by The Damned Things
- Released: April 26, 2019
- Studio: Serenity West (Hollywood); Rat Cave (Los Angeles)
- Genre: Heavy metal; hard rock
- Length: 38:19
- Label: Nuclear Blast
- Producer: Jay Ruston

The Damned Things chronology
Ironiclast (2010)	High Crimes (2019)

Singles from High Crimes
- 1. "Cells" Released: February 21, 2019; 2. "Something Good" Released: April 25, 2019

Professional ratings
Review scores
Source	Rating
metal.de	5/10
Metal Hammer	4.5/7
laut.de	3/5 stars
Consequence	Favorable
New Noise Magazine	4.5/5 stars
Punknews.org	4/5 stars

High Crimes is the second and final studio album by American rock band The Damned Things, released on April 26, 2019. It is their first album in eight years since the release of their debut album Ironiclast in 2010. It is also the first album without original guitarist and studio bassist Rob Caggiano, and their first release with Dan Andriano on bass.

== Background ==
In December 2016, the first news about The Damned Things since 2011 broke when Scott Ian revealed the band recorded five new songs for an EP that year. In April 2017, Keith Buckley posted a snippet of "Storm Charmer" on Instagram, causing rumors that new music was imminent. However, the rumored EP was never released, and the band continued to quietly record more music over the course of the next two years until an official release announcement was made on February 22, 2019, along with the release of "Cells". It was later revealed that, due to scheduling conflicts with Anthrax, Every Time I Die, and Fall Out Boy, the band could not find the right time to release music, and their EP eventually turned into a full album.

Alkaline Trio bassist and vocalist Dan Andriano joined the band for High Crimes, recording all of his parts in two days. Joe Trohman commented, "Originally I was going to play bass on the whole record, but he came in and re-played what I had done but added things—because he's a bass player! We did his stuff over the course of two days, and he nailed it."

== Track listing ==
All tracks are written by The Damned Things.

No.	Title	Length
1.	"Cells"	3:03
2.	"Something Good"	3:43
3.	"Invincible"	3:51
4.	"Omen"	4:27
5.	"Carry a Brick"	4:21
6.	"Storm Charmer"	5:57
7.	"Young Hearts"	3:22
8.	"Keep Crawling"	4:08
9.	"Let Me Be (Your Girl)"	3:19
10.	"The Fire Is Cold"	2:16

== Personnel ==
- Keith Buckley – lead vocals
- Joe Trohman – lead guitar, backing vocals
- Scott Ian – rhythm guitar, backing vocals
- Dan Andriano – bass
- Andy Hurley – drums, percussion, drum programming

Additional

- Angie Stevenson – backing vocals on "Something Good"

Production

- Jay Ruston – production, mixing, recording
- Paul Logus – mastering
