= This Addiction (song) =

- The cover art used for the digital single.

Single by Alkaline Trio

from the album This Addiction
- Released: January 12, 2010
- Recorded: 2009 at Atlas Studios in Chicago
- Genre: Punk rock
- Length: 2:35
- Label: Heart & Skull / Epitaph
- Songwriters: Matt Skiba, Dan Andriano, Derek Grant
- Producers: Alkaline Trio, Matt Allison

Alkaline Trio singles chronology
| "Love Love, Kiss Kiss" (2008) | "This Addiction" (2010) |

Alternative cover
- The cover of the 7" version of the single, using the "7" logo designed by drummer Derek Grant.

"This Addiction" is a song by the punk rock band Alkaline Trio, released as the first single from their 2010 album This Addiction. The single was released as a digital download through online retailers on January 12, 2010, and as a 7" single exclusively through Hot Topic stores on February 9, 2010.

== Background ==
"This Addiction" was written by singer and guitarist Matt Skiba (though the album credits all songs to the band as a whole) and was first performed live by Alkaline Trio during their Spring 2009 tour. It was recorded, along with the rest of the album, in July 2009 at Atlas Studios in the band's hometown of Chicago, where they had recorded much of their early material including their first two albums, 1998's Goddamnit and 2000's Maybe I'll Catch Fire. The sessions were engineered, co-produced, and mixed by Matt Allison, producer of both of those albums as well as 2001's From Here to Infirmary and much of the band's other early material. The band's decision to record in Chicago and to work with Allison reflected a desire to return to the punk rock roots of their early albums.

Thematically, "This Addiction" uses heroin and methadone addiction as a metaphor for love. Skiba remarked that "It's a human condition that I think we all, in one way or another, fall victim to. It's not to say that people can't be happy or find bliss in a relationship. It's just amazing to me how unhappy most people are and they can't shake it and can't fix it, much like an addiction."

== Release and music video ==
"This Addiction" was made available for listening as streaming audio through a dedicated website on January 5, 2010, using a marketing technique in which listeners were required to post an advertisement about the album to Facebook or Twitter in order to access the song. It became available as a download through digital retailers on January 12, and was released as a 7" single exclusively at Hot Topic stores on February 9. The 7" version includes "Dine, Dine My Darling", also from the album, as a B-side.

The music video for "This Addiction" premiered February 8. The video was filmed in a mountain field in Ventura County, California, described by Epitaph Records as "an open battlefield where two sides of the heart collide in a vibrant burst of color." It depicts the band performing the song in the center of the field, while on either side a number of children are gathered wearing black, white, and grey school uniforms. On one side the children are clean-cut, while on the other they are disheveled, wearing kerchiefs, face paint, and patches bearing the band's "7" logo (designed by drummer Derek Grant to commemorate This Addiction as the band's seventh album). The two groups charge across the field at each other, and as they collide in front of the band they explode as bursts of colorful confetti. The song impacted radio on March 2, 2010.

== Reception ==
Critical reaction to "This Addiction" has been mixed. Corey Apar of AllMusic complemented it as one of the album's strongest songs, and Drew Beringer of AbsolutePunk remarked that Skiba "sounds awesome" in it. Scott Heisel of Alternative Press, however, criticized Skiba for falling back on his "well-worn" lyrical theme of drugs, stating that "It's moments like these where it feels like he's trying too hard to keep up appearances with his band's more fairweather fans."

== Track listing ==
All songs written and composed by Matt Skiba, Dan Andriano, and Derek Grant

=== Digital version ===
| No. | Title | Length |
|---|---|---|
| 1. | "This Addiction" | 2:35 |
| Total length: | | 2:35 |

=== U.S. 7" ===
Side A
| No. | Title | Length |
|---|---|---|
| 1. | "This Addiction" | 2:35 |

Side B
| No. | Title | Length |
|---|---|---|
| 1. | "Dine, Dine My Darling" | 2:58 |
| Total length: | | 5:33 |

=== U.K. 7" ===
Side A
| No. | Title | Length |
|---|---|---|
| 1. | "This Addiction" | 2:35 |

Side B
| No. | Title | Length |
|---|---|---|
| 1. | "This Addiction" (acoustic) | 2:37 |
| Total length: | | 5:12 |

== Personnel ==
Band

- Matt Skiba – guitar, lead vocals
- Dan Andriano – bass, backing vocals
- Derek Grant – drums

Production

- Matt Allison – producer, engineer
- Ted Jensen – mastering
- Matthew Reeves and Tyler Curtis – cover photography
