= My Shame Is True =

Studio album by Alkaline Trio
- Released: April 2, 2013
- Recorded: October 2012 at The Blasting Room, Fort Collins, Colorado
- Genre: Pop punk; punk rock
- Length: 40:00
- Label: Heart & Skull, Epitaph
- Producer: Bill Stevenson, Jason Livermore

Alkaline Trio chronology
Broken Wing (2013)	My Shame Is True (2013)	Is This Thing Cursed? (2018)

Singles from My Shame Is True
- 1. "I Wanna Be a Warhol" Released: February 5, 2013; 2. "I, Pessimist" Released: February 26, 2013; 3. "She Lied To The FBI" Released: March 28, 2013

My Shame Is True is the eighth studio album by Chicago-based rock band Alkaline Trio, released on April 2, 2013 on Heart & Skull and Epitaph Records. Produced by both Bill Stevenson and Jason Livermore, the album was preceded by the single, "I Wanna Be a Warhol", and was released with an accompanying EP, Broken Wing, featuring four additional songs recorded during the same sessions.

Inspired by a recent romantic break-up, vocalist and guitarist Matt Skiba described the record as a "pseudo-concept album" and a catharsis," stating, "I just wrote this one more as a love letter to my ex-girlfriend, or an apology note set to music." Following the album's release, Skiba noted that the album brought the couple back together.

The album received mostly favorable reviews upon its release. My Shame Is True reached twenty-four on the Billboard 200.

== Writing and composition ==
Vocalist and guitarist Matt Skiba's lyrical contributions were influenced by a recent break-up, with Skiba noting, "On this one we didn't exactly plan on making a "personal" record — it just happened that way. I went through a lot since the last record and this one, like going straight out of a gnarly divorce into a really great, beautiful relationship that came to an end just as we started writing My Shame Is True." "She Lied to the FBI" was inspired by Ben Affleck's film The Town.

The album's title references Elvis Costello's debut album, My Aim is True.

== Release and promotion ==
Alkaline Trio released a lyric video for the song "I Wanna Be A Warhol" which was released as the album's lead single on February 5, 2013, later that month the band released another lyric video for the song "The Torture Doctor". A music video for the song "I, Pessimist" was released on March 6. "I Wanna Be A Warhol" was given an official video on March 8, 2013. Lyric videos for "The Temptation Of St. Anthony" and "I'm Only Here To Disappoint" were released on March 20. The band posted the entire album on YouTube on March 28. In April, the band went on a headlining UK tour with support from Bayside. Following this, the group embarked on a headlining US tour with support from Bayside between April and June. In September, the band performed at Riot Fest.

== Critical response ==
Professional ratings
Review scores
Source	Rating
AbsolutePunk	8/10
AllMusic	4.5/5 stars
Consequence of Sound	3/5 stars
Punknews	4/5 stars
The A.V. Club	C
Ultimate Guitar	7/10

AbsolutePunk gave the album a positive review, praising the album's production, Matt Skiba's lyrics and Dan Andriano's contributions, stating, "[My Shame Is True is the band's] tightest collection of songs since 2003’s Good Mourning. [...] Despite being fifteen years in the punk rock scene, My Shame Is True is a showcase of a band continuing to be vibrant and vital, when lesser bands have become stale and irrelevant." AllMusic's Matt Collar also gave the album a very positive review, noting, "My Shame Is True, is something of a revelation. Primarily, that revelation is that a band whose songcraft and musicianship might easily have plateaued by now is still bounding ever upward. To put it simply, this album is bonkers good."

The A.V. Club's Jason Heller issued the album with a negative review, stating, "When Skiba’s on fire, he’s one of pop-punk’s best tunesmiths; but when he’s coasting, as he is throughout My Shame Is True, his songs feel less black than beige."

== Track listing ==
All tracks are written by Matt Skiba, Dan Andriano, and Derek Grant.

No.	Title	Length
1.	"She Lied to the FBI"	2:48
2.	"I Wanna Be a Warhol" (featuring Brendan Kelly)	3:07
3.	"I'm Only Here to Disappoint"	2:46
4.	"Kiss You to Death"	3:21
5.	"The Temptation of St. Anthony"	3:34
6.	"I, Pessimist" (featuring Tim McIlrath)	2:10
7.	"Only Love"	4:35
8.	"The Torture Doctor"	3:38
9.	"Midnight Blue"	2:44
10.	"One Last Dance"	3:28
11.	"Young Lovers"	3:31
12.	"Until Death Do Us Part"	4:11
Total length:		40:00

Digital deluxe and Japanese editions of the album include all four songs from the band's Broken Wing EP, which was released on the same day as My Shame Is True.

== Personnel ==
=== Alkaline Trio ===
- Matt Skiba – guitars, vocals
- Dan Andriano – bass, vocals, guitars
- Derek Grant – drums, vocals

=== Additional musicians ===
- Bill Stevenson – backing vocals
- Brendan Kelly – backing vocals (2)
- Tim McIlrath – co-lead vocals (6)

=== Recording personnel ===
- Bill Stevenson – producer, engineer
- Jason Livermore – producer, engineer, mixing, mastering
- Andrew Berlin – engineer
- Chris Beeble – engineer

=== Artwork ===
- Nick Pritchard – design
- Monkeybird – album photography

== Charts ==
Chart (2013)	Peak position
US Billboard 200	24
UK Albums (OCC)	51
