= Ironiclast =

Studio album by The Damned Things
- Released: December 14, 2010
- Recorded: Chicago, Illinois; MetroSonic Studios (Brooklyn, New York)
- Genres: Hard rock, heavy metal
- Length: 39:16
- Labels: Mercury, Island
- Producers: Rob Caggiano, Joe Trohman

The Damned Things chronology
Ironiclast (2010)	High Crimes (2019)

Singles from Ironiclast
- 1. "We've Got a Situation Here" Released: October 25, 2010

Ironiclast is the debut album by American rock band The Damned Things. The album was released on December 14, 2010, internationally and a day later in North America. The supergroup includes Joe Trohman and Andy Hurley of Fall Out Boy, Scott Ian and Rob Caggiano of Anthrax and Keith Buckley and Josh Newton of Every Time I Die. Newton, however, was only a touring member of The Damned Things initially, and did not write or record anything for Ironiclast. The album was self-produced by Caggiano and Trohman, and was released through Mercury Records.

== Promotion ==
On October 21, 2010, the band released the song "Friday Night (Going Down in Flames)" for free via their Facebook and Myspace pages.

On October 25, 2010, the band released the first single from the album, "We've Got a Situation Here", on iTunes. Previously a demo of the song, along with the demo of the title track "Ironiclast", were released on the band's Myspace page on May 30, 2010.

On December 1, 2010, a music video for the song "We've Got a Situation Here" premiered and was directed by Brendon Small.

On December 6, 2010, the song "Handbook for the Recently Deceased" premiered for free streaming on GuitarWorld.com. On December 7, 2010, the song "Black Heart" premiered for free streaming on Spin.com.

== Musical style ==
With this album, the band was aiming for a heavy/classic rock, blues-oriented, riff-oriented sound, while trying to avoid the cliches associated with those styles and combining elements from their own bands. The result is a classic hard rock sound combined with the heavier aspects of Anthrax and Every Time I Die and the hook-laden choruses of Fall Out Boy. Guitarist Joe Trohman cited Led Zeppelin and Thin Lizzy as influences on the record.

== Reception ==
Professional ratings
Review scores
Source	Rating
AbsolutePunk	92%
AllMusic	3.5/5 stars
BLARE Magazine	4/5 stars
FasterLouder	Favorable
Melodic	3.5/5 stars
Rock Sound	9/10
Sputnikmusic	3.5/5

Drew Beringer of AbsolutePunk gave a positive review of the album, saying that "it's heavy, hook-laden, and stuffed with huge riffs. It's basically a modern take on the classic rock record" and that "this is just a straight up rock and roll takeover" with an overall rating of 92%.

=== Charts ===
Ironiclast sold 6,200 copies in its first week, placing it at No. 1 on the Billboard Heatseekers chart for "new and developing artists". It sold 31,000 copies as of February 2013.

== Track listing ==
All tracks are written by Keith Buckley, Rob Caggiano and Joe Trohman; except where noted

No.	Title	Writer(s)	Length
1.	"Handbook for the Recently Deceased"		4:16
2.	"Bad Blood"		3:22
3.	"Friday Night (Going Down in Flames)"		3:49
4.	"We've Got a Situation Here"	Buckley, Scott Ian, Trohman	4:27
5.	"Black Heart"		3:18
6.	"A Great Reckoning"	Buckley, Caggiano, Ian, Trohman	4:35
7.	"Little Darling"		3:19
8.	"Ironiclast"	Buckley, Ian, Trohman	2:32
9.	"Graverobber"		4:51
10.	"The Blues Havin' Blues"		4:47
Total length:			39:16

== Personnel ==
The Damned Things

- Keith Buckley – lead vocals
- Rob Caggiano – bass, lead guitar, backing vocals, percussion
- Scott Ian – rhythm guitar, backing vocals
- Joe Trohman – lead guitar, rhythm guitar, backing vocals, percussion
- Andy Hurley – drums

Additional musicians

- Stephanie Alexander – backing vocals
- Tabitha Fair – backing vocals
- Nick Raskulinecz – percussion

Artwork and design

- The Damned Things – art direction, concept
- Patrick Hegarty – art coordinator
- Doug Joswick – package production
- Mike Mitchell – art direction, concept
- Kristen Yiengst – art coordinator

Recording and production

- Rob Caggiano – engineer, producer
- Ben Terry – mixing assistant
- Tara Bryan – A&R
- Evan Lipschutz – A&R
- Jon Martinez – assistant engineer
- Dave McNair – mastering
- Claudius Mittendorfer – drum engineering
- Nick Raskulinecz – mixing
- Dante Renzi – drum technician
- Bryan Russell – editing, engineer
- Joe Trohman – producer
- Teruhisa Uchiyama – assistant engineer
