= Keith Buckley =

American singer

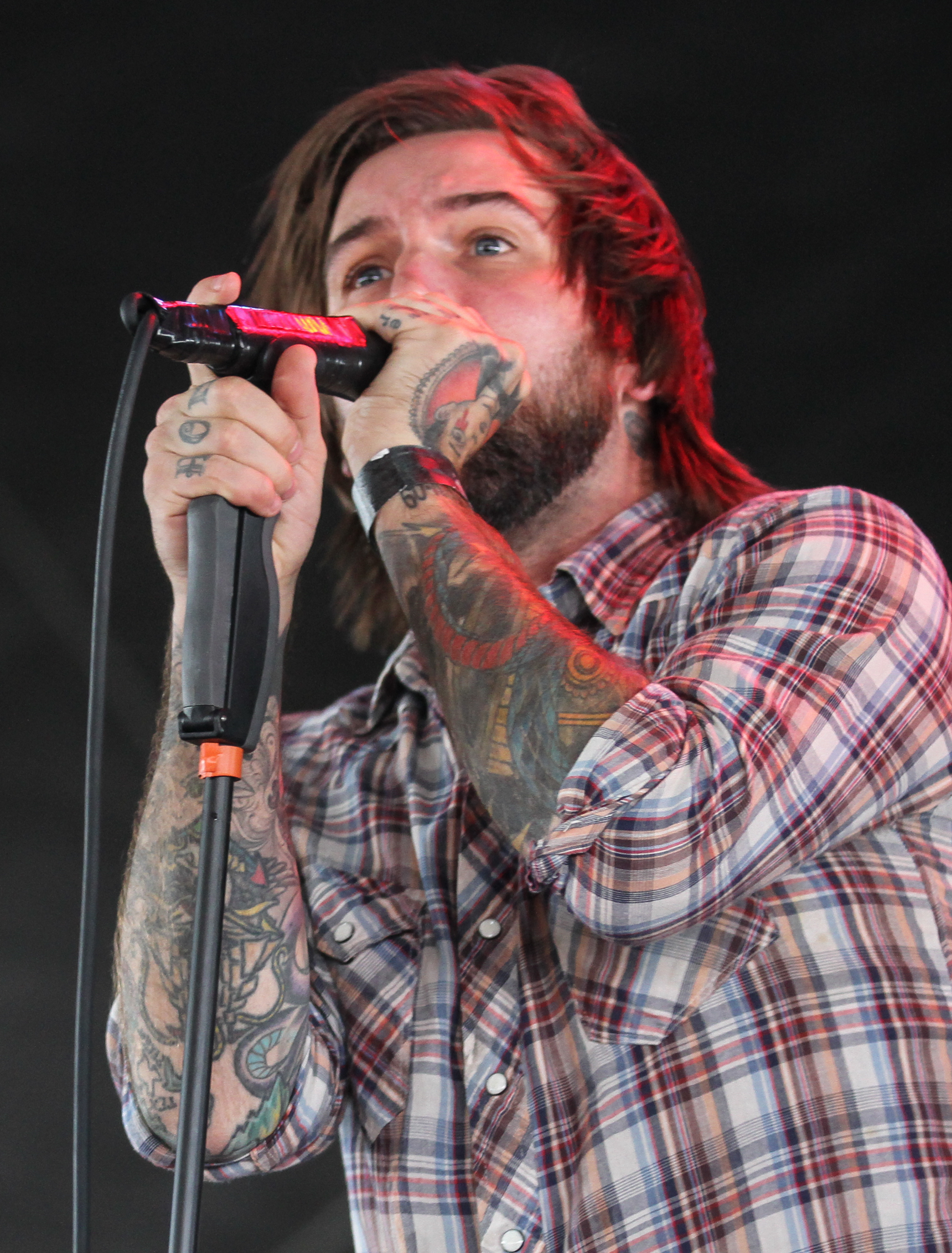
- Buckley in 2013

Background information
- Also known as: Grimace
- Born: November 19, 1979 (age 46); Buffalo, New York, U.S.
- Origin: Kingston, New York, U.S.
- Genres: Metalcore; hardcore punk; heavy metal; Southern rock; hard rock; mathcore (early)
- Occupations: Singer; songwriter
- Years active: 1998–present
- Member of: Many Eyes
- Formerly of: Every Time I Die; The Damned Things; Finale

Keith Michael Buckley (born November 19, 1979) is an American singer, best known as the vocalist and lyricist of Many Eyes, the now defunct metalcore band Every Time I Die and the heavy metal supergroup the Damned Things. He is also a published author.

== Early life and education ==
Buckley was born in Kingston, New York and grew up in Buffalo, New York. He attended Virginia Tech and then the University at Buffalo before doing music full-time. He is also a former English teacher.

== Career ==
=== Every Time I Die ===
In 1998, Buckley established the band Every Time I Die with his brother, Jordan, in Buffalo, New York. He described Every Time I Die as a "Buffalo Bills tailgate party and a high school kegger". One of Buckley's writing tactics was to "get incoherently drunk" and see what comes out.

On January 4, 2006, Buckley and Every Time I Die were in a van accident but escaped unharmed.

On December 4, 2021, Buckley announced that he was taking a hiatus from the band for his mental health.

=== Many Eyes ===
In September 2023, it was reported that extras were needed for a music video for Buckley's new band for an October 1 shoot date. On October 9, Buckley announced via Instagram that the band is called Many Eyes and features Charlie and Nick Bellmore of Toxic Holocaust, Kingdom of Sorrow, and Jamey Jastas solo band on guitar and drums respectively.

=== Side projects ===
Buckley is a member of Finale, his side project. The two-piece plays indie and acoustic music. Buckley lent his vocal talents to an R&B hook in Chae Hawk's track "PBS" and also "Stockholm Sindrome", a track with Philly/Pittsburgh electro-clash artist Pfunkt. He is also featured with Corey Letson on Four Year Strong's 90s cover album Explains It All covering the song "Bullet with Butterfly Wings" by the Smashing Pumpkins.

He is also a member of supergroup the Damned Things, founded in 2009, alongside members of Fall Out Boy and Anthrax. The band released its debut album Ironiclast in 2010, but was on hiatus from 2012 until 2018. They released their second album High Crimes on April 26, 2019, and have toured subsequently.

Buckley released his first novel, Scale, in December 2015 through Rare Bird Books and Lit. He released his second novel, Watch, in August 2018 through Rare Bird Books and Lit.

Buckley is a member of an indie electro duo named Tape, alongside Joshua Hurley. He was also the vocalist for Buffalo's local 90s cover band Soul Patch.

Buckley also released an EP in 2014 under the band name Black Medal. They released a 4-song EP, that was accessible by a website. A music video was filmed for the song "Art & Craft".

Buckley contributed to the vocal cover and tribute of "The Broken Vow" by Converge released June 27, 2022 as part of Two Minutes to Late Night's series 'Hardcore Forever'. Additionally Buckley has contributed on released tracks by SeeYouSpaceCowboy, Knocked Loose, Pretty Boy Stomp, Stray from the Path, and Say Anything.

In 2025, Buckley featured on a single released by The Barbarians of California.

== Personal life ==
He has a younger brother, Jordan, who was the lead guitarist in Every Time I Die. They had a younger sister named Jaclyn, who lived with Rett syndrome and died from it in early 2017. Since then, Keith has offered to personally help disabled attendees of the band's shows with accessibility.
