= Blood, Hair, and Eyeballs =

Studio album by Alkaline Trio
- Released: January 26, 2024
- Recorded: 2023
- Studios: Studio 606, Los Angeles, California
- Genres: Punk rock, emo
- Length: 35:48
- Label: Rise
- Producer: Cameron Webb

Alkaline Trio chronology
E.P. (2020)	Blood, Hair, and Eyeballs (2024)

Singles from Blood, Hair, and Eyeballs
- 1. "Blood, Hair, and Eyeballs" Released: October 17, 2023; 2. "Bad Time" Released: November 30, 2023; 3. "Versions of You" Released: January 5, 2024

Blood, Hair, and Eyeballs is the tenth studio album by American punk rock band Alkaline Trio, released on January 26, 2024, on Rise Records. It is the band's final album with longtime drummer Derek Grant, who departed from the group prior to the album's announcement.

The album was recorded at Studio 606 and produced by Cameron Webb, returning from the band's previous album, Is This Thing Cursed? (2018). Its nearly six-year gap from Is This Thing Cursed? marks the longest between two albums from the band to date.

Released to critical acclaim, the album was preceded by the singles, "Blood, Hair, and Eyeballs", "Bad Time", and "Versions of You".

== Background ==
In early 2022, Alkaline Trio began writing new material for a new studio album. While touring with Taking Back Sunday, drummer Derek Grant revealed that they had been playing new songs at soundchecks, and were preparing to record in the near future.

During the album cycle for Is This Thing Cursed? (2018), Grant took a hiatus from the band which left him absent from live performances and studio appearances from 2018 to 2021. His first performance following his hiatus was at Slam Dunk Festival 2021 in Leeds, England. However, touring continued to take a toll on Grant following the COVID-19 pandemic, and by 2023, he decided to leave the band in focus of his mental health, graphic design, and music production. It was later revealed that Grant had recorded drums for the album prior to his departure, with bassist/vocalist Dan Andriano confirming that Grant left during the mixing process for the album.

Shortly after Grant's departure, the band announced Atom Willard as their new drummer. Willard previously toured with Alkaline Trio in 2001 and appeared in their music video for "Private Eye". He had also played with guitarist Matt Skiba in their band theHell, and the two had also recently started a new band, Lektron.

In 2022, Skiba departed from Blink-182 after seven years as its guitarist and co-lead vocalist following the return of original guitarist and vocalist Tom DeLonge. While Alkaline Trio remained active during this time, Skiba admitted that: "Trio took a bit of a backseat for a while. It's been the longest break Alkaline Trio has taken from putting out a new album, so I felt like we owed our fans the best record we could make."

The album's title comes from a term used by Skiba's mother, who was once an emergency room nurse; "She and her co-workers referred to exceptionally busy nights as 'blood, hair, and eyeballs.'"

== Writing and recording ==
Recording officially began in 2023 at Dave Grohl's Studio 606, which is where Skiba and Willard had recently recorded a joint single for Lektron. Skiba stated that the trio had started to think about bands such as Nirvana, The Police and The Jimi Hendrix Experience, and were excited to record in a studio "engineered for loud, live rock music." The band took a more collaborative approach to the recording and made sure to build the songs "from the ground up, in the same room which hasn't happened since the band started."

Skiba and bassist Dan Andriano were inspired by what they referred to as "apocalypse culture," and how bad news in modern culture creates so much fear in people.

"Without sounding trite, it's the way that we get our information now through social media. There's always been good and there's always been horror, but it feels like the horror hits our doorsteps much quicker these days. It gives people the feeling that things are escalating horribly." - Matt Skiba

== Release ==
The album was announced on October 17, 2023, alongside the release of the title track and its music video. This was accompanied by the announcement of a supporting tour with Drug Church. The album's second single "Bad Time" was released on November 30, 2023, along with a music video. The album's third single, "Versions of You", was released on January 5, 2024. The band appeared on Jimmy Kimmel Live! on January 23, 2024, performing "Bad Time". A music video for "Break" was released on January 25, 2024.

== Critical reception ==
Professional ratings
Aggregate scores
Source	Rating
Metacritic	81/100
Review scores
Source	Rating
AllMusic	4/5 stars
DIY	3/5 stars
Kerrang!	4/5 stars
The Skinny	4/5 stars
Sputnikmusic	4.5/5 stars
Under the Radar	70/100

Metacritic, which assigns a normalized rating out of 100 to reviews from mainstream critics, scored the album at 81 out of 100, indicating "universal acclaim" based on 8 reviews.

== Track listing ==
All tracks are written by Dan Andriano, Derek Grant, and Matt Skiba.

Blood, Hair, and Eyeballs track listing
No.	Title	Lead vocals	Length
1.	"Hot for Preacher"	Skiba	3:45
2.	"Meet Me"	Skiba	3:54
3.	"Versions of You"	Andriano; Skiba	3:13
4.	"Bad Time"	Skiba	2:56
5.	"Scars"	Andriano; Skiba	3:28
6.	"Break"	Skiba	3:23
7.	"Shake with Me"	Skiba; Andriano	3:58
8.	"Blood, Hair, and Eyeballs"	Skiba	3:01
9.	"Hinterlude"	Instrumental	1:05
10.	"Broken Down in a Time Machine"	Andriano	3:03
11.	"Teenage Heart"	Skiba; Andriano	4:04
Total length:			35:48

== Personnel ==
Alkaline Trio

- Matt Skiba – guitar, vocals
- Dan Andriano – bass, vocals
- Derek Grant – drums

Additional musicians

- Jamie Blake – additional vocals (tracks 2, 4, 8, 11)
- Curtis Mathewson – keyboards (tracks 2, 11)

Production

- Cameron Webb – production, mixing
- Andrew Alekel – engineering

== Charts ==
Chart performance for Blood, Hair, and Eyeballs
Chart (2024)	Peak position
Australian Vinyl Albums (ARIA)	13
German Albums (Offizielle Top 100)	27
Scottish Albums (Official Charts)	11
UK Albums (Official Charts)	64
UK Independent Albums (Official Charts)	7
UK Rock & Metal Albums (Official Charts)	3
US Billboard 200	188
US Independent Albums (Billboard)	33
US Top Alternative Albums (Billboard)	22
