= Neal Thompson (writer) =

American nonfiction writer (born 1965)

- Born: January 16, 1965 (age 61); New Jersey, United States
- Education: University of Scranton (1987)
- Occupation: Writer
- Writing career
- Period: 2002-present
- Genre: Nonfiction
- Website: www.nealthompson.com

Neal Thompson is an American nonfiction writer who resides in Seattle, Washington with his family. He has authored four full-length books, Driving With The Devil, Light This Candle, Hurricane Season and A Curious Man.

== Books ==
- Light This Candle: The Life and Times of Alan Shepard (2005), ISBN 1-4000-8122-X
- Driving with the Devil: Southern Moonshine, Detroit Wheels, and the Birth of NASCAR (2007), ISBN 1-4000-8226-9
- Hurricane Season: Hurricane Season: A Coach, His Team, and Their Triumph in the Time of Katrina (2007), ISBN 1-4165-4070-9
- A Curious Man: The Strange and Brilliant Life of Robert "Believe It or Not!" Ripley (2013), ISBN 978-0-7704-3622-3
- Kickflip Boys: A Memoir of Freedom, Rebellion, and the Chaos of Fatherhood (2018) ISBN 978-0-0623-9434-7
