= Hurricane Season (album) =

Studio album by Dan Andriano
- Released: August 9, 2011
- Recorded: 2011 at The Waiting Room, piano and organ on tracks 1 & 6 by Erin Lewis and harmony vocals on track 7 by Pete Groleau and Bryan Groleau
- Genre: Underground rock
- Length: 35:59
- Label: Asian Man
- Producer: Dan Andriano

Hurricane Season is the first studio album by Alkaline Trio vocalist and bassist Dan Andriano, released on August 9, 2011, through Asian Man Records. The album is primarily acoustic, and was met with positive critical reception, being given a 4.5/5 by Punknews.org, and a 4/5 by Alternative Press.

From This Oil Can borrows lyrics from I Remember A Rooftop, a song Andriano wrote for Alkaline Trio's acoustic album Damnesia.

== Track listing ==
All tracks are written by Dan Andriano.

No.	Title	Length
1.	"It's Gonna Rain All Day"	4:10
2.	"Hurricane Season"	4:18
3.	"Hollow Sounds"	2:36
4.	"Let Me In"	2:46
5.	"This Light"	3:47
6.	"On Monday"	4:19
7.	"Me And Denver"	2:23
8.	"Say Say Say"	3:34
9.	"The Last Day We Ever Close Our Eyes"	3:54
10.	"From This Oil Can"	4:12
Total length:		35:59
