= Dan Andriano =

American musician

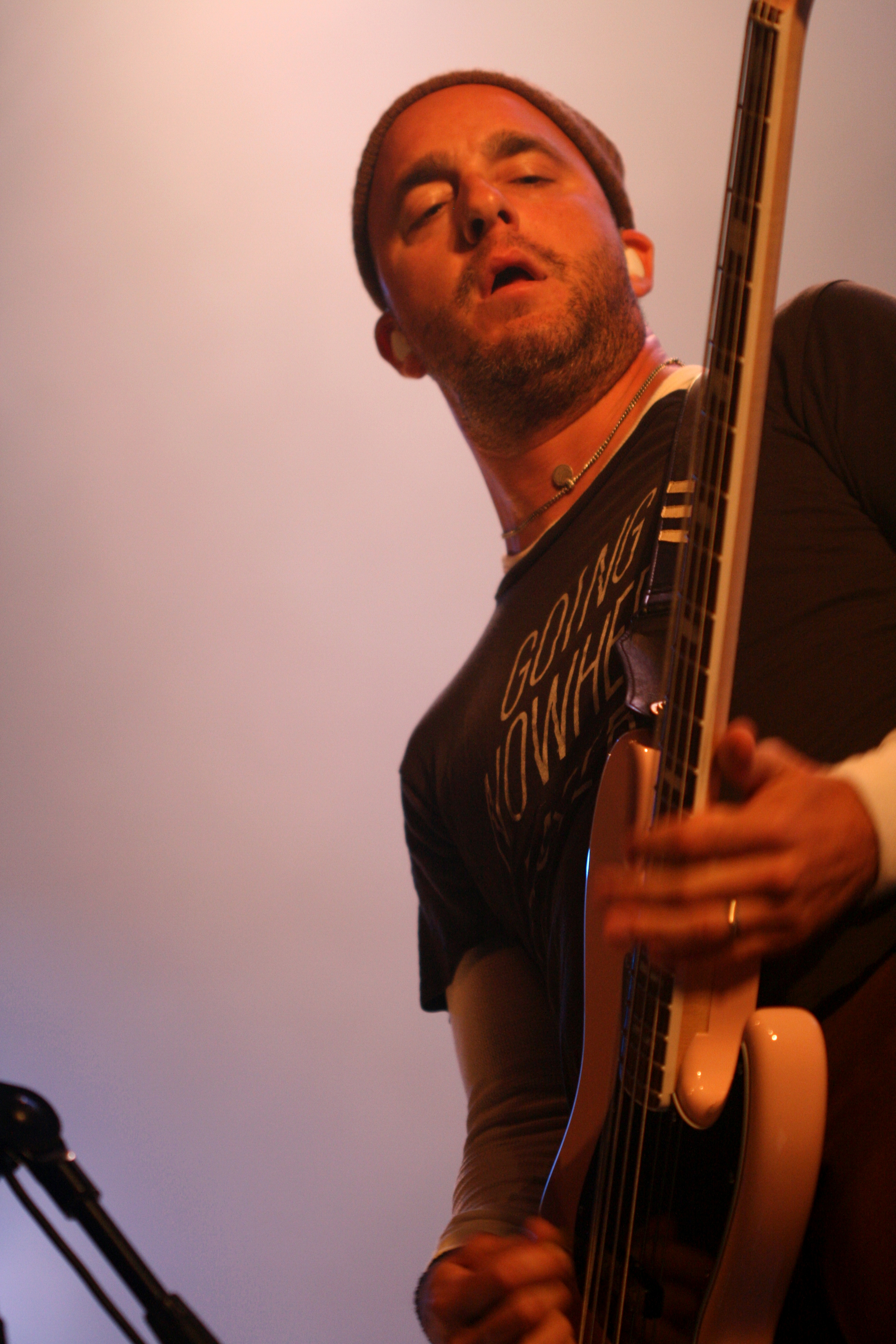
- Andriano performing with Alkaline Trio in 2013

Background information
- Born: Daniel Michael Andriano; June 27, 1977 (age 49); Elgin, Illinois, U.S.
- Genres: Punk rock; alternative rock; ska punk; hard rock
- Occupation: Musician
- Instruments: Bass guitar; vocals; guitar
- Years active: 1993–present
- Member of: Alkaline Trio; The Falcon
- Formerly of: Tuesday; Slapstick; The Damned Things
- Website: danandriano.com

Daniel Michael Andriano (born June 27, 1977) is an American musician. He is best known as the co-lead vocalist and bassist of the punk rock band Alkaline Trio; though not a founding member, he has appeared on every studio album to date.

Andriano also records solo material under the names Dan Andriano in the Emergency Room and has released two solo albums to date, Hurricane Season (2011) and Party Adjacent (2015). In 2019, he played bass with the rock supergroup The Damned Things.

== Early bands ==
In 1993, he and several friends from the Elgin area formed the punk-ska band Slapstick, with Andriano playing bass and contributing backing vocals. He would remain a member through the release of two full-length albums (Lookit! and a self-titled compilation) until the group's breakup in 1996. After the breakup he and two other ex-members of Slapstick formed the band Tuesday, which released an EP, Early Summer, in 1997 and a full-length album, Freewheelin, later that year.

== Alkaline Trio ==
In late 1997, Andriano was asked by Matt Skiba to join Alkaline Trio, replacing original bassist Rob Doran. His first release with the band was the 1998 EP For Your Lungs Only. He has appeared on every subsequent release.

== Side and solo projects ==
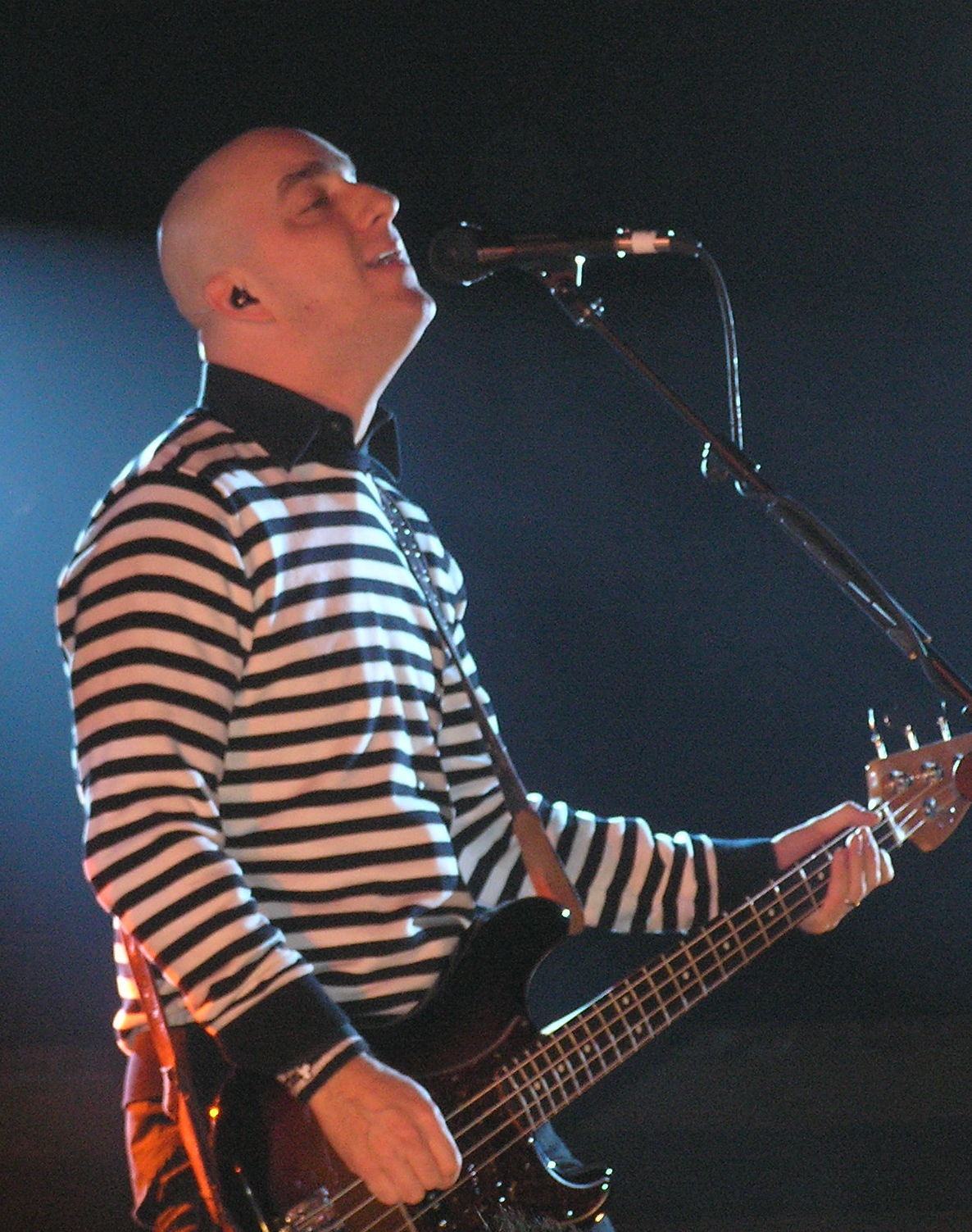
Andriano in 2006

Andriano played bass on The Falcon's 2004 EP, God Don't Make No Trash or Up Your Ass with Broken Glass, at the request of guitarist and lead vocalist Brendan Kelly, and would return in 2006 to play bass and provide vocals for Unicornography. He also played bass guitar on Ben Weasel's 2007 album These Ones Are Bitter.

Andriano also performs as a solo act under the name "Dan Andriano in the Emergency Room". His first solo album, Hurricane Season, was released on August 9, 2011, through Asian Man Records. Later that year, Andriano toured Europe with Chuck Ragan, Dave Hause of The Loved Ones, and Brian Fallon of The Gaslight Anthem as part of the 2011 Revival Tour. The following year, Andriano again performed on the North American leg of The Revival Tour alongside Ragan, Cory Branan, Laura Jane Grace of Against Me!, and Nathaniel Rateliff. Dan Andriano "in the Emergency Room" released his second album 'Party Adjacent' on July 17, 2015.

In 2019, Andriano joined the rock supergroup The Damned Things, replacing bassist Josh Newton. He has recorded one album with the band titled High Crimes.

Andriano announced a new side project in August 2021 called Dan Andriano & The Bygones composed of himself and Get Married members Dylan Moore and Randy Moore. Later that year, the group announced their debut album, Dear Darkness, which released on February 11, 2022.

== Equipment ==
Andriano has played Fender Jazz and Precision Basses for most of his career. He also had a limited run of 20 signature Jazz Basses made by GPC.

For amplification, Andriano uses a 1971 Marshall Major in the studio and Orange AD-200B (and occasionally Ampeg SVT) amps in concert.

== Discography ==
=== Solo ===
- Mike Felumlee / Dan Andriano Split (2002)
- Gail (With Matt Pryor) (2017)

=== With Slapstick ===
- Lookit! (1996)
- Slapstick (1997)

=== With Tuesday ===
- Early Summer EP (1997)
- Freewheelin (1997)

=== With Alkaline Trio ===
- Goddamnit (1998)
- Maybe I'll Catch Fire (2000)
- The Alkaline Trio (2000)
- From Here to Infirmary (2001)
- Good Mourning (2003)
- Crimson (2005)
- Remains (2007)
- Agony and Irony (2008)
- This Addiction (2010)
- Damnesia (2011)
- My Shame Is True (2013)
- Is This Thing Cursed? (2018)
- E.P. (2020)
- Blood, Hair, and Eyeballs (2024)

=== With The Falcon ===
- God Don't Make No Trash or Up Your Ass with Broken Glass EP (2004)
- Unicornography (2006)
- Gather Up the Chaps (2016)

=== With Ben Weasel And His Iron String Quartet ===
- These Ones Are Bitter (2007)

=== With Dan Andriano In The Emergency Room ===
- Hurricane Season (2011)
- Of Peace, Quiet And Monsters EP (2012)
- European Vacation EP (With Brendan Kelly And The Wandering Birds) (2012)
- Party Adjacent (2015)

=== With The Damned Things ===
- High Crimes (2019)

=== With Dan Andriano & The Bygones ===
- Dear Darkness (2022)

=== Guest appearances ===
- New Found Glory – "Forget My Name" on Sticks and Stones
- Stephen Egerton – "Our Last Song" on The Seven Degrees Of Stephen Egerton
