= Alkaline Trio =

American punk rock band

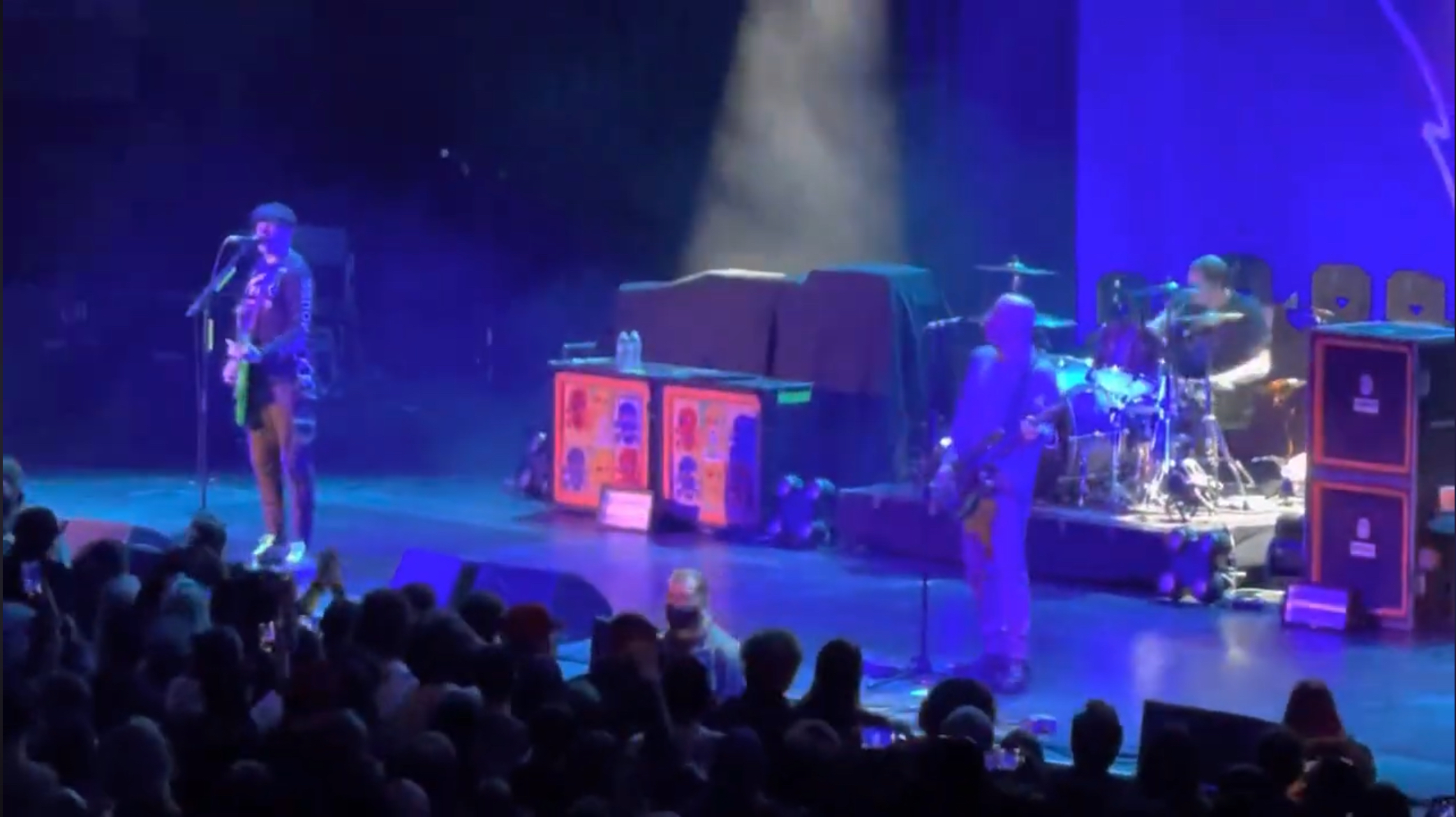
- Alkaline Trio performing in Los Angeles in 2021. Left to right: Skiba, Andriano, and Grant

Background information
- Origin: Chicago, Illinois, U.S.
- Genres: Pop-punk; punk rock; emo; alternative rock
- Works: Discography
- Years active: 1996–present
- Labels: Asian Man; Vagrant; V2; Epic; Epitaph; Heart & Skull; Rise
- Members: Matt Skiba; Dan Andriano; Tosh Peterson
- Past members: Rob Doran; Glenn Porter; Mike Felumlee; Derek Grant; Atom Willard
- Website: alkalinetrio.com

Alkaline Trio is an American punk rock band formed in Chicago, in 1996. The band consists of Matt Skiba (vocals, guitar), Dan Andriano (vocals, bass) and Tosh Peterson (drums).

Founded in late 1996 by Skiba, bassist Rob Doran, and drummer Glenn Porter, Alkaline Trio released its debut single, "Sundials", in 1997. Following its release, Doran departed from the band and was replaced by Andriano, who occupied the role of co-lead vocalist alongside Skiba. The band subsequently recorded an EP, For Your Lungs Only (1998), and its debut studio album, Goddamnit (1998). Following the release of the band's second album, Maybe I'll Catch Fire (2000), Porter left the band and was replaced by Mike Felumlee for its subsequent album, From Here to Infirmary (2001).

Backed by the singles "Stupid Kid" and "Private Eye", From Here to Infirmary significantly increased the band's exposure, and its follow-up, Good Mourning (2003), charted highly on the Billboard 200. Good Mourning marked the recording debut of longtime drummer Derek Grant. In 2005, the band released Crimson which expanded upon the band's punk rock influences, with prominent overdubs and additional instrumentation, and continued with this direction on Agony & Irony (2008), which was released on Epic Records.

In 2010, the band released This Addiction on its own label Heart & Skull and Epitaph. Recorded in the band's home town of Chicago, with early producer Matt Allison, the album was a conscious effort by the band to return to their punk rock roots; it became the highest-charting album of their career, debuting on the Billboard 200 at No. 11. In 2011, the band celebrated its 15-year anniversary with the release of Damnesia, which featured new, acoustic-based recordings of songs from across the band's career. The band's eighth studio album, My Shame Is True, was released on April 2, 2013, while their ninth album, Is This Thing Cursed? was released on August 31, 2018, followed by a three track EP titled E.P. on March 19, 2020.

In June 2023, Grant departed from the band after twenty-two years, with Atom Willard being announced as his replacement soon thereafter. Their tenth album and final release with Grant, Blood, Hair, and Eyeballs, was released on January 26, 2024. The band recorded and released three stand-alone singles with producer Travis Barker across 2025, with Willard departing the following year in February 2026. Skiba announced that Tosh Peterson would take over on drums the following month.

== History ==
=== 1996–2000: Early years, Goddamnit and Maybe I'll Catch Fire ===
Alkaline Trio was formed in December 1996, originally consisting of Matt Skiba (guitar/lead vocals), Rob Doran (bass/vocals), and Glenn Porter (drums/vocals). 1997 saw the release of the band's first EP, Sundials. This was followed shortly after by the departure of Rob Doran, after which Dan Andriano, former singer of Asian Man Records band Tuesday and bassist for Slapstick, took his place and they began recording. The band released their second EP entitled For Your Lungs Only, in 1998. Later that year, the band released their first full-length album, Goddamnit, followed by Maybe I'll Catch Fire in 2000, both on Asian Man Records). In 1999, the band released the I Lied My Face Off EP on Asian Man Records and filmed their first music video, directed by Link 80 guitarist Matt Bettinelli-Olpin. Also in 2000, the band released a collection of their previously released EPs on their self-titled album.

=== 2001–2004: From Here to Infirmary and Good Mourning ===
In 2001, the band released From Here To Infirmary on Vagrant Records. This album inspired music videos for the singles "Stupid Kid" and "Private Eye." The album was the band's first album to reach the Billboard top 200 and the first to gross six figures in sales.

Their next full-length album was Good Mourning, released in 2003, with the album's launch single "We've Had Enough" seeing much the same success as the previous single "Stupid Kid". The album was something of a departure from earlier works, featuring greater production values.

The band appeared on various compilation albums, notably Plea for Peace Vol. 1, Vagrant Records: Another Year on the Streets Vol. 1, 2, and 3, and Rock Against Bush Vol. 1. Matt Skiba and Dan Andriano have both independently recorded split records, Skiba with Kevin Seconds on Asian Man Records and Andriano with Mike Felumlee on Double Zero Records, as well as jointly performing backing vocal duties on the album This is Unity Music by Common Rider. They recorded two split EPs: one with Hot Water Music in 2002 and the other with One Man Army in 2004.

In 2004, Andriano became a member of The Falcon, a group consisting of The Lawrence Arms' bassist Brendan Kelly, previously of Slapstick (alongside Andriano) and The Broadways, and drummer Neil Hennessy. The Falcon also saw contributions from Todd Mohney of The Killing Tree and formerly Rise Against. The band released an EP, God Don't Make No Trash / Up Your Ass With Broken Glass in 2005 and its first full-length, Unicornography in September 2006.

=== 2005–2008: Crimson and Agony & Irony ===
Alkaline Trio released their fifth studio album on Vagrant Records, titled Crimson, on May 24, 2005, which featured the single "Time to Waste." The single for this song also included bonus tracks produced by Squirtgun and Common Rider bassist Mass Giorgini. The tracks "Mercy Me" and "Burn" have also been released as singles from the album.

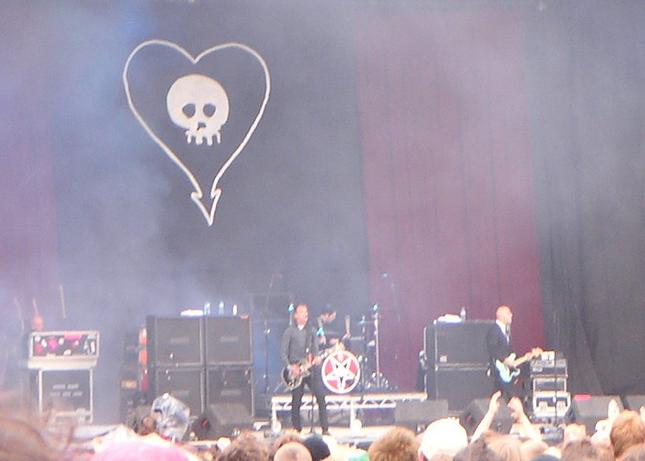
Alkaline Trio performing in 2005

In December 2005, a dual-disc special edition re-release of Crimson hit store shelves. This album features the original cut of Crimson released earlier in the year, while the 2nd disc has demo and acoustic/live versions of some of the songs. Additionally, an enhanced version of the lyrics and liner notes are available for download with personal messages from the band members on the history and/or inspiration(s) behind the songs.

In September 2006, Patent Pending, the debut album by Matt Skiba's side project Heavens was released. The band consisted of Skiba on guitar and vocals, and Josiah Steinbrick (of hardcore punk outfit F-Minus) on bass. On the album, the duo were joined by The Mars Volta's Isaiah "Ikey" Owens on organ and Matthew Compton on drums and percussion. Skiba was playing with Heavens during a short tour in the fall of 2006.

In October 2006, it was announced that Alkaline Trio had signed with V2 Records. On January 12, 2007, the North America branch of the label announced that they were undergoing restructuring to focus on their back catalogue and digital distribution. As a result, their employees were let go and their roster of artists left as free agents.

January 30, 2007, marked the release of Remains an album of B-sides, rarities and live performances. An accompanying DVD contained performances from The Occult Roots Tour and all the band's music videos to date. This marked the end of their association with Vagrant Records.

During late May 2007 the band began listing Epic Records as its label on their MySpace.

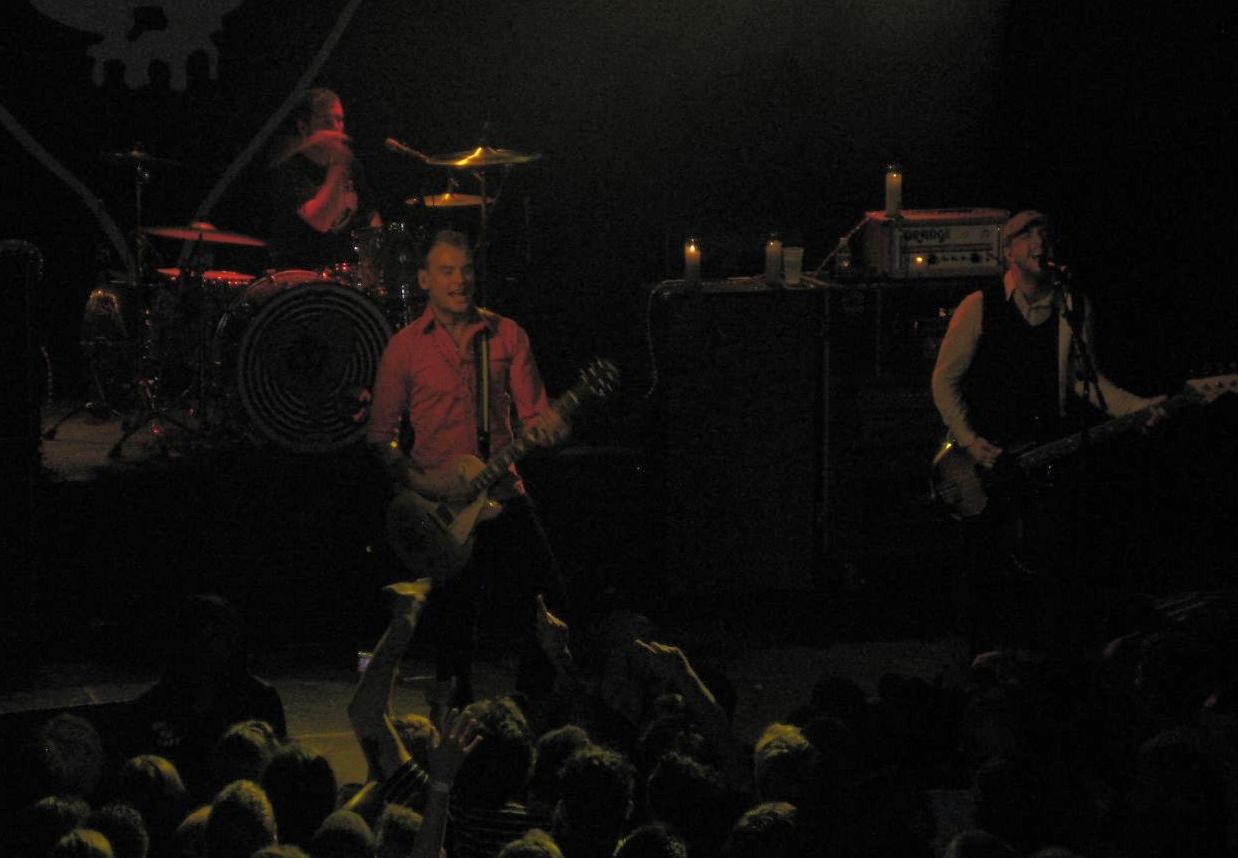
The band during a concert in New York in 2008

On April 4, 2008, "In Vein" was made available for streaming through the band's Myspace profile. On April 7, the album's title Agony & Irony and track listing was revealed.

=== 2009–2011: This Addiction and Damnesia ===
During a concert in May 2009, the band revealed that they were no longer signed to Epic Records and that they would be releasing new material through their own label later in the year. Recording began that July. Four songs from the album ("This Addiction", "Dead On The Floor", "Dine, Dine My Darling", and "Dorothy") were debuted on that tour with Saves the Day.

On November 18, 2009, the band announced that they would be releasing their new album on their own newly formed label, Heart & Skull, a joint venture with Epitaph Records. In the same article, Skiba also confirmed that the new album would be released on February 23, 2010, with another new song announced, entitled "The American Scream." The trio went back to their home in Chicago to record This Addiction after recording their last few albums in L.A. The band worked hard to go back to their roots with the album, Atlas Studios being the place they recorded their first three albums.

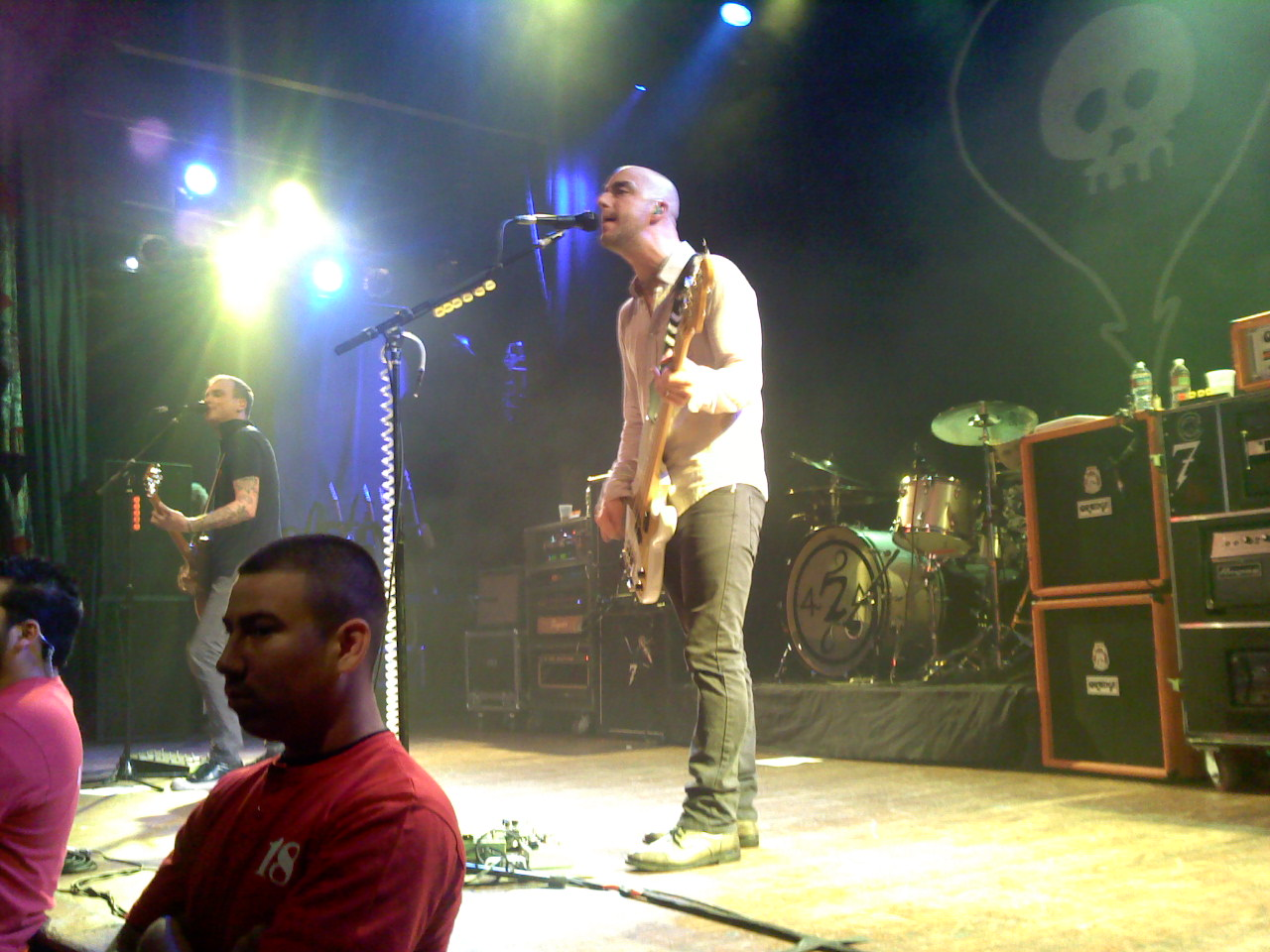
Alkaline Trio performing at the House of Blues in Hollywood in support of This Addiction

On December 1, Alkaline Trio confirmed to Rock Sound that the title of their new album would be This Addiction:

"It is the first song on the record and the title of our new album," said vocalist Matt Skiba. "The song takes heroin addiction as a metaphor for love. The whole record is really personal, all three of us have been through quite a bit since our last album [2008's Agony & Irony] and it is all expressed through this, all the songs are about the relationships we've been in and so the record has a constant theme."

The album debuted at No. 11 on the Billboard 200, making it the highest the band has ever charted to date.

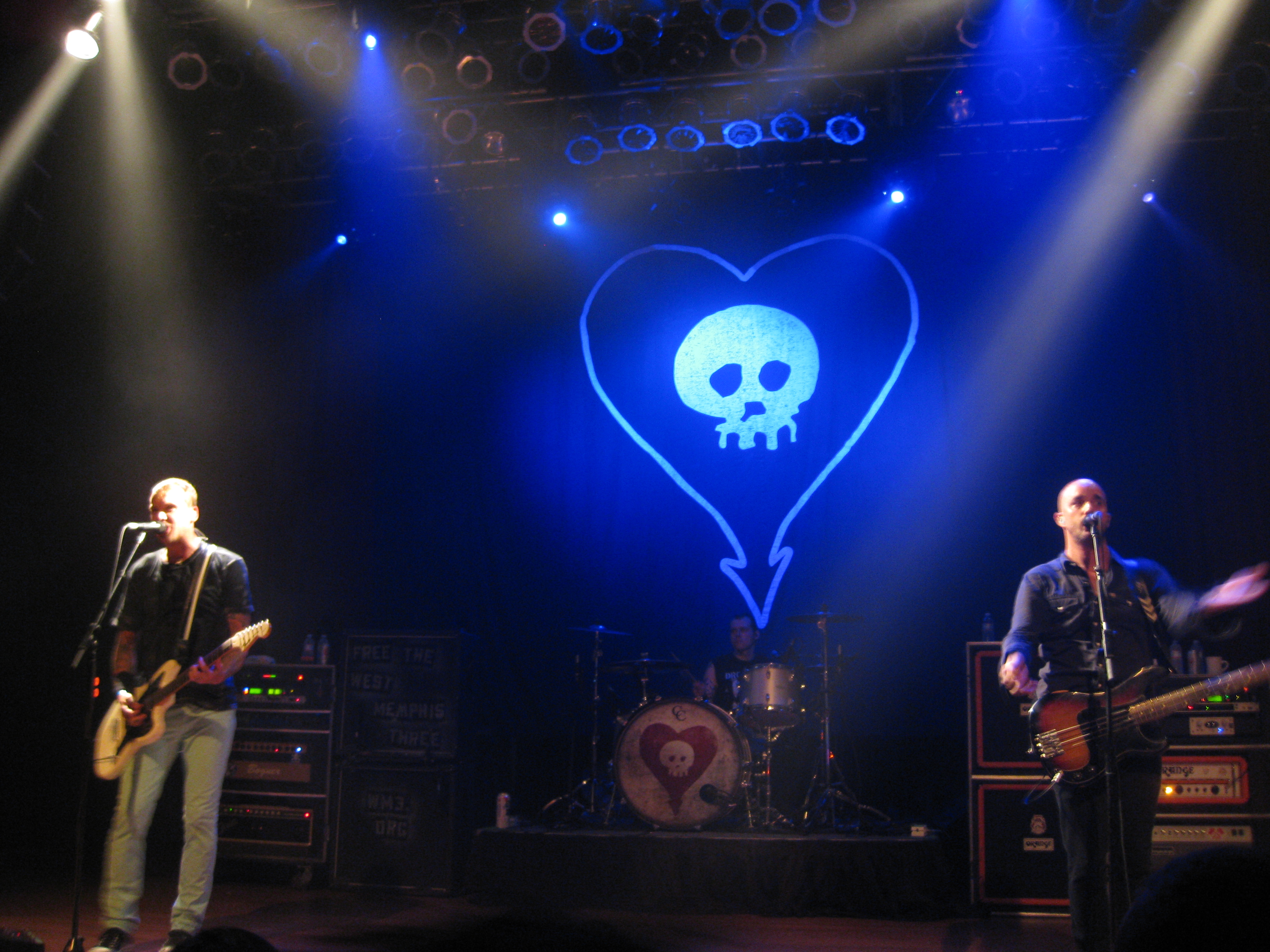
Alkaline Trio in 2011. Left to right: Skiba, Grant, and Andriano.

Alkaline Trio released an LP, Damnesia, on July 12, 2011. Consisting of "a selection of beloved fan favorites selected from the group's extensive catalogue and presented in an intimate semi-unplugged format", the LP also included two new songs, "Olde English 800" and "I Remember a Rooftop", as well as a cover version of the Violent Femmes' "I Held Her in My Arms". The band went on a fifteenth-anniversary United States tour in support of the album.

=== 2012–2015: My Shame Is True and "Past Live" tour ===
On July 14, 2012, in an interview with The Punk Site, it was confirmed by Dan Andriano that the band would begin recording their next studio album that October: "We're going to go work with Bill [Stevenson] at Fort Collins at the Blasting Room. Bill and Jason [Livermore]. We've all wanted to work with Bill for a long time and this is kind of the time to do it. So we're going to go hang out there in October. Make a new record."

On October 27, 2012, Skiba confirmed that the band had completed the album. On February 1, 2013, the band released a lyric video for the album's lead single, "I Wanna Be A Warhol". On February 5, the band released the artwork and track-listing for the album, titled My Shame Is True, as well as the artwork and track-listing for an EP called Broken Wing. Both My Shame Is True and Broken Wing were released on April 2, 2013. The album peaked at #24 on the Billboard charts The band toured to support the album during 2013.

In 2014, the band conducted an anthology tour dubbed the "Past Live" tour, in which they performed all eight studio albums in their entirety over four consecutive shows in several cities.

=== 2016–2021: Is This Thing Cursed? ===
In an interview on July 20, 2015, Dan Andriano was quoted saying, "We need to make a new record, pretty much. We're gonna go to England and play some shows with NOFX, do a couple festivals this fall, but it's time for us to make a new record. But I'm doing some Emergency Room stuff and I'm not sure what Matt's gonna be up to with the Sekrets, if he's gonna tour on that, but I think by early next year we're gonna be recording another record."

While the production of the ninth album was postponed by Matt Skiba's work with Blink-182, in an interview on July 3, 2016, Skiba assured that the album would move forward, saying, "I'll be writing for a new Alkaline Trio record while on this summer tour so once things with Blink cool down a bit, the Trio can go in and make a new record and start touring again while Blink is on break. [...] It's such a unique and wonderful position to be in, having two full time bands that people – myself included – are big fans of."

Alkaline Trio opened for the Misfits on December 28 and 30, 2017. On January 11, 2018, the band announced that the Chicago stop during their 2014/15 Past Live Tour (all eight studio albums performed in four nights) will be released in its entirety on Blu-ray, and as an eight-LP box set. Past Live will be released in February 2018. In addition to this announcement, the band also hinted at new music coming soon. Andriano stated that "There's not an inch of me that feels like we're done making music, or we're done making new stuff. I wanna be a band that people want to hear new stuff from. Because I feel like I'm still in a band that wants to write good, new music."

Alkaline Trio was slated to perform at the Self Help Festival on March 3, 2018. However, they were forced to back out after Skiba went through throat surgery. The band shared on Instagram: "Matt's recovery from throat surgery is not healing as quickly as planned and, per his doctor, he can't perform. Everything went well, he just needs more time to heal so he can play many shows in the future. Thank you for understanding."

On July 19, 2018, Alkaline Trio announced their ninth studio album, Is This Thing Cursed?, along with the release of the lead single, "Blackbird." The band also went on a North American tour to support the album with opening act, Together Pangea. On August 2, 2018, it was announced on Skiba's Instagram that Grant would not be drumming on the tour due to ongoing health problems. Skiba and Andriano recruited former My Chemical Romance touring drummer, Jarrod Alexander, to fill in for Grant on the tour, which began the next day in Dallas, Texas and ended on October 18 in Santa Cruz, California, while the album was released on August 31.

In January 2020, the band posted a picture of Andriano in a recording studio with the subtitle "New Jams!" (as well as some pictures with Skiba and Andriano in vocal booths) on Instagram, indicating that work on new material was on its way.

On March 19, 2020, the band released a three-song EP entitled E.P. after postponing a planned tour with Bad Religion due to the COVID-19 pandemic, with the songs being recorded before the pandemic. Drummer Derek Grant returned to the band around this time, after taking a lengthy break. Skiba announced in Instagram comments in April 2020 that he is currently writing more music for the band. In June 2021, the tour with Bad Religion was rescheduled with the first show taking place in Riverside, California, on October 15, 2021.

=== 2022–2024: Grant's departure and Blood, Hair, and Eyeballs ===
In March 2022, the band went on a UK co-headlining tour with Taking Back Sunday. During an interview on the tour, Grant discussed their plans for new music, stating that new songs had mostly been played at soundchecks, but that "things are starting to kind of take shape, and I think we're at the stage now where we're ready to start actually kind of committing to tape somehow, even if it's just on an iPhone at you know, soundchecks." Grant also discussed plans for a 20th anniversary celebration for Good Mourning, explaining that he had some ideas for what they may want to do, such as shows or a rerelease of the album.

On June 8, 2023, Grant announced his departure from the band after 22 years, citing mental health reasons and a desire to pursue music production and graphic design. On June 15, the band announced Atom Willard (who had previously served as a touring replacement in 2001) as their new drummer.

On October 17, 2023, the band officially announced their next album Blood, Hair, and Eyeballs with a release date of January 26, 2024. This was accompanied by the release of the album's title track and the announcement of a 2024 headlining tour with Drug Church. In the following weeks, the band also released the album's second single, "Bad Time" on November 30, 2023. The album features the last contributions from Grant, as he had completed his drum parts prior to his departure. The album's third single, "Versions of You", came out on January 5, 2024.

In support of the Blood, Hair, and Eyeballs, Alkaline Trio embarked on multiple headlining tours with support from Drug Church, Worriers, Spanish Love Songs, and Slomosa, while also supporting Dropkick Murphys on their 2024 Australian tour. Later that year, the band also released a joint single "The Sacrifice / At Sickness." The band initially recorded the songs in the same sessions for Blood, Hair, and Eyeballs, but cut them from the final track list for time reasons.

=== 2025–present: Recording with Travis Barker, Willard's departure and Peterson's arrival ===
On July 18, 2025, the band released, "Oblivion", the first in a series of three stand-alone singles produced by Matt Skiba's former Blink-182 bandmate, Travis Barker. The tracks marked Atom Willard's recording debut for the band, with Alkaline Trio set to support blink-182 on their "Missionary Impossible" tour between August and October 2025. Reflecting on the recording process, Skiba noted: "I don’t think I’ve ever had such a great time in the studio. We'd wanted to get into the studio with Atom as soon as he’d joined the band and we finally found the time to do it. [...] I was blown away by how natural and amazing Travis is in the role of a producer and by the beauty and serenity of his studio. We had initially gone in thinking we would do a cover we’d been playing with, to take the pressure off of our first recording with Atom but ended up with three new songs." Andriano elaborated, suggesting that the band will continue to work with Barker in the future: "Matt’s been on fire lately, between him having so many good ideas and Travis being so easy and cool to work with we could’ve stayed in there forever. It’s always exciting when working with a producer for the first time, but Travis really blew us all away. He had so many cool and thoughtful ideas for all aspects of the tunes, from structure and writing suggestions to mix ideas, it was awesome. I have a feeling we might just do this again!" The band released two further singles from the sessions, "Bleeding Out" and "Surprise, Surprise", in September and October, respectively.

On February 2, 2026, drummer Atom Willard announced on his Instagram that he left the band, stating: "I have parted ways with Alkaline Trio. Thanks to everyone who made my time there so awesome, very thankful for the experience. I am currently considering all studio, collaboration, and touring opportunities."

On March 21, 2026, the band announced that drummer Tosh Peterson had joined the band as Willard's replacement. In a statement on Instagram, Skiba wrote: "I met Tosh at Swingers a few months back for lunch, to meet up and discuss the possibility of him playing in Alkaline Trio. Tosh’s mom was also there, who turned out to be a fellow history buff so her and I spent half the lunch talking about Churchill and the Miracle of Dunkirk while Tosh politely ate his fries. He later told Dan that if we had had a problem with his mom coming to lunch he probably didn’t want to play with us anyway. Apart from the absolute MONSTER he is behind a drum kit he is just a lovely guy: KIND, polite, enthusiastic, driven and HILARIOUS. I told Dan I wouldn’t want Tosh to play with us if he HADN’T brought his mom. Tosh is a beautiful human being we’re very excited to travel and play music with and a drummer we couldn’t be more thankful to be able to welcome into OUR family." Alongside his forthcoming work with Alkaline Trio, Peterson is Lady Gaga's live drummer, and he has performed and toured with Troye Sivan, Filter, Fall Out Boy, Machine Gun Kelly and Lil Nas X, amongst others.

== Music style, influences, lyrics, related bands, and similar bands ==
=== Music style, influences, and lyrics ===
Alkaline Trio's style has been primarily described as pop-punk, punk rock, emo, and alternative rock. Alkaline Trio's musical influences include Jawbreaker, the Clash, the Buzzcocks, Screeching Weasel, Pegboy, Naked Raygun, Ramones, Misfits, and Green Day. The band's dark, gothic aesthetic borrows from such acts the Cure, the Sisters of Mercy, Ministry, Front 242, Bauhaus, and Joy Division.

Alkaline Trio's lyrical themes have included alcoholism, women, love, and depression. Dan Ozzi of Differuser wrote that Alkaline Trio's "lyrics combine the macabre imagery of the Misfits with the clever turns of phrases of Jawbreaker."

The staff of Consequence ranked the band at number 10 on their list of "The 100 Best Pop Punk Bands" in 2019.

=== Related bands and similar bands ===
Alkaline Trio is part of a very large circle of Chicago punk/hardcore bands. Skiba was previously a member of Jerkwater, Blunt, and Traitors. Former drummer Glenn Porter played in 88 Fingers Louie. Andriano's previous bands were Slapstick and Tuesday. Mike Felumlee (drums) has also performed with Duvall and Smoking Popes. Derek Grant, who joined the band after the From Here to Infirmary album, has also played for Laughing Glass, Skolars, Telegraph, The Suicide Machines, Thoughts of Ionesco, Dan Zanes, The Sugar Pup and Sean Madigan Hoen. In 2004 Dan Andriano joined the newly assembled group, The Falcon, with Andriano performing with fellow former Slapstick member Brendan Kelly (guitar and vocals), Neil Hennessy (drums), and Todd Mohney, a former member of Rise Against. Mohney played guitar on the first EP but did not appear in the band's debut album Unicornography, and his spot was filled in by Kelly and Hennessy.

Alkaline Trio have been compared to bands such as Jawbreaker and Green Day.

In 2006 Skiba started the side-project Heavens with Josiah Steinbrick, previously of F-Minus. Their debut album, Patent Pending was released on Epitaph Records.

On September 16, 2009, bassist and co-vocalist Dan Andriano announced he would be playing a series of solo shows across the US under the name "Dan Andriano In The Emergency Room". The band announced on Twitter that Andriano will be releasing his debut solo album under the same name in summer 2011. The album, Hurricane Season, was released on August 9, 2011, under the moniker 'Dan Andriano in the Emergency Room'. A second album followed in 2015 named Party Adjacent.

Skiba was set to release his debut solo album on February 14, 2010, but it was delayed until the summer of 2010 due to the new Alkaline Trio album. The album's name is Demos. In May 2012 Skiba released his second solo album (featuring his backing band, The Sekrets) entitled Babylon. In June 2015 Skiba released his third solo album with The Sekrets entitled "KUTS".

From 2015 to 2022, Skiba performed and recorded with rock band Blink-182. He began performing with the group starting with three shows in March 2015 filling in for long-time guitarist/vocalist Tom DeLonge who departed the group for the second time earlier that year. Skiba eventually became an official member and recorded two full-length albums with the band, before DeLonge rejoined.

== Band members ==
Current

- Matt Skiba – lead and backing vocals, guitar, bass (1996–present)
- Dan Andriano – bass, lead and backing vocals, guitar (1997–present)
- Tosh Peterson – drums, percussion (2026–present)

Former

- Rob Doran – bass, backing vocals (1996–1997)
- Glenn Porter – drums, percussion (1996–2000)
- Mike Felumlee – drums, percussion (2000–2001)
- Derek Grant – drums, percussion, backing and occasional lead vocals, acoustic guitar (2001–2023; not performing 2018–2021)
- Atom Willard – drums, percussion (2023–2026; touring substitute 2000–2001)

Touring

- Pete Parada – drums (2001)
- Jarrod Alexander – drums (2018–2019)

Studio

- Tony Barsotti – drums (2020)
- Travis Barker – drums (2026)

Timeline

== Discography ==
Studio albums

- Goddamnit (1998)
- Maybe I'll Catch Fire (2000)
- From Here to Infirmary (2001)
- Good Mourning (2003)
- Crimson (2005)
- Agony & Irony (2008)
- This Addiction (2010)
- My Shame Is True (2013)
- Is This Thing Cursed? (2018)
- Blood, Hair, and Eyeballs (2024)
