= All That Glue =

Compilation album by Sleaford Mods
- Released: 15 May 2020
- Length: 71:59
- Label: Rough Trade

Sleaford Mods chronology
| Eton Alive (2019) | All That Glue (2020) | Spare Ribs (2021) |

Professional ratings
Aggregate scores
| Source | Rating |
|---|---|
| Metacritic | 82/100 |
Review scores
| Source | Rating |
| AllMusic | 4/5 stars |
| Clash | 8/10 |
| Exclaim! | 7/10 |
| Loud and Quiet | 8/10 |
| Louder Than War | 9/10 |
| MusicOMH | 4/5 stars |
| Pitchfork | 8/10 |

All That Glue is a compilation album by British electronic music duo Sleaford Mods. It was released on 15 May 2020 on the Rough Trade label.

The album cover depicts Marcel Duchamp's readymade sculpture Fountain from 1917.

== Content and background ==
The album contains tracks taken from albums and singles as well as previously unreleased tracks. The unreleased tracks were recorded mostly when the band were working on albums or EPs between 2013 and 2016. The band has stated that these more obscure songs were included on All That Glue because "we thought that some of them deserved to be put out because they’re just as strong as the albums tracks."

The album title is the name of the first song Sleaford Mods members Jason Williamson and Andrew Fearn ever wrote together c. 2011. The track was available as a bonus flexi disc on a limited edition vinyl version of the album.

== Critical reception ==
All That Glue was met with "universal acclaim" reviews from critics. At Metacritic, which assigns a weighted average rating out of 100 to reviews from mainstream publications, this release received an average score of 82, based on 6 reviews.

== Track listing ==
All lyrics are written by Jason Williamson; all music is composed by Andrew Fearn.

CD 1
| No. | Title | Original Release | Length |
|---|---|---|---|
| 1. | "McFlurry" | Austerity Dogs | 4:28 |
| 2. | "Snake It" | | 2:27 |
| 3. | "Fizzy" | Austerity Dogs | 2:57 |
| 4. | "Rich List" | | 3:02 |
| 5. | "Jobseeker" | “Jobseeker” (single) | 4:04 |
| 6. | "Jolly Fucker" | “Mr. Jolly Fucker” (single) | 2:12 |
| 7. | "Routine Dean" | “Routine Dean” (single) | 2:21 |
| 8. | "Tied Up in Nottz" | Divide and Exit | 2:43 |
| 9. | "Big Dream" | | 1:55 |
| 10. | "Blog Maggot" | | 3:54 |
| 11. | "Tweet Tweet Tweet" | Divide and Exit | 3:05 |
| Total length: | | | 33:08 |

Note: The album contains the 2013 version of “Jobseeker”. The original version (based on a sample of The Yardbirds' hit “For Your Love”) can be found on the album The Mekon from 2008.

CD 2
| No. | Title | Original Release | Length |
|---|---|---|---|
| 1. | "Tarantula Deadly Cargo" | Key Markets | 3:24 |
| 2. | "Fat Tax" | The Harbinger Sound Sampler (V.A. compilation) | 3:34 |
| 3. | "Slow One's Bothered" | “Talk Bollocks” (single) | 2:48 |
| 4. | "Revenue" | | 4:00 |
| 5. | "Rochester" | | 3:29 |
| 6. | "TCR" | TCR (EP) | 4:13 |
| 7. | "Reef of Grief" | | 2:49 |
| 8. | "B.H.S." | English Tapas | 3:50 |
| 9. | "Second" | | 3:04 |
| 10. | "OBCT" | Eton Alive | 4:04 |
| 11. | "When You Come Up to Me" | Eton Alive | 3:42 |
| Total length: | | | 38:57 |

Note: The album contains the slow version of “No One's Bothered”. The original version can be found on the album Key Markets.

Bonus flexi disc
| No. | Title | Length |
|---|---|---|
| 1. | "All That Glue" | 2:39 |

== Personnel ==
Sleaford Mods

- Jason Williamson
- Andrew Fearn

Technical

- Matt Colton – mastering
- Joris Diks – illustration, handwriting
- Simon Parfrement – photography
- Philip Laslett – design, layout

== Charts ==
Chart performance for All That Glue
| Chart (2020) | Peak position |
|---|---|
| Scottish Albums (OCC) | 5 |
| UK Albums (OCC) | 10 |
| UK Independent Albums (OCC) | 1 |
