= TCR =

TCR may stand for:

== Arts and entertainment ==
- TCR, the musical project of Robin Moulder and TC Smith
- "TCR", a single by Prolapse
- The Comic Reader, a comics news-fanzine 1961–1984
- T.C.R., the 2016 EP by Sleaford Mods

== Businesses and organizations ==
- TCR (record label), or Thursday Club Records
- TCR International, an airport ground support equipment supplier company
- TCR fm, British radio station
- The Climate Registry, a North American nonprofit collaboration to record and track greenhouse gas emissions
- Toronto Civic Railways, Canada
- Total Control Racing, a toy brand from the late 1970s

== Places ==
- Theatre Cedar Rapids, is a community theatre in Cedar Rapids, Iowa, U.S.
- Tottenham Court Road, a major road in Central London

== Science and technology ==
- Teachers College Record, an academic journal of education
- Transmission control room, a room found at broadcast facilities and television stations
- T-cell receptor, a molecule found on the surface of some immune cells
- Transient climate response, change in temperature due to doubling of CO_{2}
- Total Core Recovery, an expression used to qualify the quality of a rock mass in boreholes
- Thyristor controlled reactor, a device in electric power transmission systems
- Temperature coefficient of resistance, measured by a Microbolometer
- Transcription coupled nucleotide excision repair (TC-NER or TCR), a DNA repair mechanism

== Sport ==
- TCR Touring Car, a touring car racing specification
  - TCR International Series, an international touring car series
- Transcontinental Race, an annual, self-supported, ultra-distance cycling race across Europe
- Total Compact Road bicycle by Giant Bicycles

== Transport ==
- Thrissur railway station, code TCR, Kerala, India
- Tottenham Court Road station, a London Underground and Crossrail station serving and named for the road
- Tuticorin Airport, Tamil Nadu, India, IATA code TCR
