= T.C.R. (EP) =

EP by Sleaford Mods
- Released: 14 October 2016
- Genres: New wave; post-punk
- Length: 17:17
- Label: Rough Trade
- Producer: Andrew Fearn

Sleaford Mods chronology
Key Markets (2015)	T.C.R. (2016)	Live at SO36 (2016)

Singles from T.C.R.
- 1. "T.C.R." Released: 8 September 2016

T.C.R. is the second extended play by the English duo Sleaford Mods, released on 14 October 2016 and produced by Andrew Fearn. The EP is the band's debut record on Rough Trade Records.

== Background, recording, and composition ==
Recorded in England between Nottingham and Bristol, T.C.R. is one the first records released by Sleaford Mods in the wake of Brexit, a relatively tumultuous political period in the UK. Although the group is typically known for its social commentary, the EP often emphasises less about aspects of contemporary British life and more on Jason Williamson's personal life than previous records. Musically, Fearn's minimalist backing tracks on T.C.R. were described in Pitchfork as influenced by new wave and post-punk music.

The opener and title track is an acronym for "Total Control Racing", a reference to the brand of toy car track sets from the 1970s. In the song, Williamson uses the toy brand and its spinning wheels as a metaphor for his struggles with being a parent and aging and how they contribute to his feelings of self-doubt. Compared to the rest of the record, "T.C.R." is a relatively upbeat song augmented with synthesisers. Williamson focuses more on social commentary on the subsequent tracks "I Can Tell" and "Britain Thirst", respectively about bus stops and the establishment. "Dad's Corner" refers to touring life as a musician.

== Singles, promotion, and release ==
On 8 September 2016, Sleaford Mods released the song "T.C.R." with a music video and the announcement that the single is the title track to a new EP, to be released on the 14th of October through Rough Trade Records, their first record for the label. In the video, Fearn and Williamson use the toy kit on a living room floor, which the duo thought was the likeliest location for children when it was most popular. A day before the release of T.C.R., the band previewed another track, "I Can Tell".

== Critical reception ==
Professional ratings
Review scores
Source	Rating
Christgau's Consumer Guide	(3-star Honorable Mention)
The Line of Best Fit	7/10
Pitchfork	6.7/10
The Skinny	4/5 stars

In a four star review for The Skinny, Pete Wild said that "Williamson doesn't mess about, and ... Fearn's menacing minimal sounds remain as compelling as ever. Every track is a winner, bizarre and hilarious and provocative." Dave Beech of The Line of Best Fit gave the EP a rating of 7 out of 10 and called it "Far from being a bad release"; while they found the production "both glossier ... and darker" than previous releases, they felt "it just does little to break the mould the band themselves set."

Rating the EP 6.7 out of 10, Pitchfork's Saby Reyes-Kulkarni thought that "T.C.R. doesn't contain anything as infectiously catchy—or even irreverent—as 'Jobseeker,' 'Mr. Jolly Fucker,' or '14 Day Court'", but was optimistic about the future of the group because they were "finally allowing their music to breathe somewhat". Additionally, in contrast to the band's earlier efforts, Reyes-Kulkarni thought that the heavier emphasis on personal subject matters "rescues [Williamson] from becoming the type of self-righteous caricature he might himself have railed on."

== Track listing ==
All lyrics are written by Jason Williamson; all music is composed by Andrew Fearn.

T.C.R. track listing
No.	Title	Length
1.	"T.C.R."	4:11
2.	"I Can Tell"	3:41
3.	"Britain Thirst"	3:20
4.	"Dad's Corner"	2:37
5.	"You're a Nottshead"	3:28
Total length:		17:17

== Personnel ==
Credits are adapted from the CD liner notes and Tidal.

=== Sleaford Mods ===
- Andrew Fearn – programming, production, engineering, mixing
- Jason Williamson – vocals

=== Additional personnel ===
- Simon Parfrement – cover photography
- Steve Lippert – artwork
- Matt Colton – mastering at Alchemy, London
