= The Demise of Planet X =

Studio album by Sleaford Mods
- Released: 16 January 2026
- Studios: JT Soar, Nottingham; Abbey Road, London; Invada, Bristol
- Genre: Electro-punk
- Length: 41:37
- Label: Rough Trade
- Producer: Sleaford Mods

Sleaford Mods chronology
More UK Grim (2023)	The Demise of Planet X (2026)

Singles from The Demise of Planet X
- 1. "Megaton" Released: 16 September 2025; 2. "The Good Life" Released: 21 October 2025; 3. "Bad Santa" Released: 20 November 2025; 4. "No Touch" Released: 16 December 2025; 5. "Elitest G.O.A.T." Released: 12 January 2026

The Demise of Planet X is the 13th studio album by the English duo Sleaford Mods, released on 16 January 2026 through Rough Trade Records. Preceded by five singles, it features performances from Gwendoline Christie, Big Special, Aldous Harding, Sue Tompkins, Liam Bailey, and Snowy.

== Recording ==
The album was recorded at Sleaford Mods' regular studio JT Soar in Nottingham, with additional recording done at Abbey Road Studios in London and Invada Studios in Bristol.

== Title and concept ==
Sleaford Mods had previously used the title "The Demise of Planet X" as the name of a livestream event in early 2021 at the Village Underground in London, when they were in the midst of a tour shortly before releasing the album Spare Ribs. The name is in reference to the Planet X conspiracy theory, which posits a doomsday scenario resulting from a planetary collision or near-collision. Frontman Jason Williamson told The Standard that although he believes that it is just a conspiracy, "it's like it's already happened. We've already been laid to waste. Now what have we got? Much is the same. Artisan Scotch eggs are still being baked, Pret's still open, but everyone’s on tenterhooks." This idea formed the broad concept for the album.

== Promotion and singles ==
On 16 September 2025, Sleaford Mods released a single entitled "Megaton", which at that point had not been publicly attached to an upcoming album. The accompanying music video directed by Nick Waplington shows the duo performing the song at Speakers' Corner in Hyde Park, London. Proceeds from the single went to the charity organisation War Child. The second single "The Good Life" was accompanied with a Ben Wheatley-directed music video and the announcement for the album on 21 October 2025. Consisting of a "minimalist, three note beat", the song features vocals from actress Gwendoline Christie—her musical debut—and duo Big Special. An alternate "dark" version of the music video was later released on Halloween 2025 and, like the original, was directed by Wheatley and shot in one take.

A third single, "Bad Santa", was released on 20 November 2025 with a video that shows the duo performing the song live at JT Soar, directed by Ian Tatham. On 16 December, Sleaford Mods released the single "No Touch", featuring vocals from Sue Tompkins, formerly of Life Without Buildings. She finished her part in two days with the duo while they were recording in Bristol. In a press release, Williamson said that Tompkins had a cold at the time, but they felt "it added to the track." The corresponding music video for the single was directed by Andrea Arnold, an English filmmaker known for works such as Fish Tank (2009) and American Honey (2016). On 12 January 2026, four days before the release of the album, the duo revealed the fifth single "Elitest G.O.A.T" featuring New Zealand singer-songwriter Aldous Harding with a music video directed by John Minton.

With the release of the deluxe version of the album, Sleaford Mods released one more single, "Cato", again featuring Sue Tompkins, who directed the accompanied music video. The song was recorded about a month after the trio recorded "No Touch".

== Release ==
The Demise of Planet X was released on 16 January 2026 via Rough Trade Records. It peaked on the UK Albums Chart at no. 6, additionally reaching no. 4 and no. 1 on the Scottish and UK Independent Albums Charts, respectively. Outside of the UK, it charted within the top forty in Australia, Germany, and New Zealand. A deluxe edition of the album was released digitally on 15 October 2026, including nine unreleased songs and demos.

== Critical reception ==
Professional ratings
Aggregate scores
Source	Rating
AnyDecentMusic?	7.4/10
Metacritic	76/100
Review scores
Source	Rating
The Arts Desk	4/5 stars
Clash	7/10
Classic Pop	3.5/5 stars
Classic Rock	8/10
DIY	2.5/5 stars
Louder Than War	4/5 stars
Mojo	4/5 stars
Record Collector	4/5 stars
The Times	4/5 stars
Uncut	8/10

According to the review aggregator Metacritic, The Demise of Planet X received "generally favorable reviews" based on a weighted average score of 76 out of 100 from 17 critic scores. AnyDecentMusic?, another reviews aggregator, gave the album an average of 7.4 out of 10 based on a sample of 17 critics' scores.

In a four star review, Andrew Trendell of the NME called the album "the band's most musically ambitious and diverse record yet" and said that the duo "remain just as singular and uncompromising". In an 8 out of 10 review for Uncut magazine, Stuart Stubbs said that, "with plenty of gags and even more appalling language", The Demise of Planet X "sounds very Sleaford Mods", adding that "The softer edges and new accessibility only makes the fury and dread eerily heavier." Editors at AllMusic gave the album 4 stars of 5, with reviewer Heather Phares commenting on its political backdrop: "Sleaford Mods may not offer any easy answers, but musically at least, they're more committed to progress than the society around them." In a mixed review for DIY, Cameron Sinclair Harris thought the album was "most compelling" when it was Williamson's lyrics were more confessional, like on the closer "The Unwrap"; otherwise, they thought that unless the listener is already a fan of the duo, it doesn't provide anything new "beside a few more timely references".

== Track listing ==
All lyrics are written by Jason Williamson, with additional lyricists noted below; all music is composed by Andrew Fearn and Williamson.

The Demise of Planet X track listing
No.	Title	Lyrics	Length
1.	"The Good Life" (feat. Gwendoline Christie and Big Special)	Christie; Joseph Hicklin; Callum Maloney	3:01
2.	"Double Diamond"		4:19
3.	"Elitest G.O.A.T." (feat. Aldous Harding)	Hannah Topp	3:25
4.	"Megaton"		2:52
5.	"No Touch" (feat. Sue Tompkins)	Tompkins	3:04
6.	"Bad Santa"		3:24
7.	"The Demise of Planet X"		2:23
8.	"Don Draper"		4:18
9.	"Gina Was"		3:26
10.	"Shoving the Images"		2:27
11.	"Flood the Zone" (feat. Liam Bailey)	Bailey; Georgia Copeland; Nadia Latoya	3:21
12.	"Kill List" (feat. Snowy)	Alexander Shand-Green	3:11
13.	"The Unwrap"		2:26
Total length:			41:37

Deluxe edition bonus tracks
No.	Title	Length
14.	"How What"	2:26
15.	"Cato" (feat. Sue Tompkins)	2:43
16.	"Give 'Em What They Want"	2:47
17.	"The Good Life" (alt version feat. Big Special)	3:21
18.	"Cheap Cheap Shit"	3:23
19.	"There We Are Then"	3:59
20.	"Armageddon's Wi Me Now"	1:38
21.	"The Return of the Bin White Dukes"	2:54
22.	"Dr Who?"	3:28
Total length:		68:16

== Personnel ==
Credits for the standard and deluxe editions are adapted from Tidal.

=== Sleaford Mods ===
- Jason Williamson – vocals, production (all tracks)
- Andrew Fearn – programming, production (all tracks)

=== Additional contributors ===
- Joseph Hicklin, Callum Moloney – vocals (tracks 1, 17)
- Gwendoline Christie – vocals (1)
- Aldous Harding – vocals (3)
- Sue Tompkins – vocals (5, 15)
- Liam Bailey, Georgia Copeland, Nadia Latoya – vocals (11)
- Snowy – vocals (12)
- Matt Colton – mastering (all tracks)

== Charts ==
Chart performance for The Demise of Planet X
Chart (2026)	Peak position
Australian Albums (ARIA)	36
Austrian Albums (Ö3 Austria)	71
Belgian Albums (Ultratop Flanders)	178
French Albums (SNEP)	178
German Albums (Offizielle Top 100)	13
German Rock & Metal Albums (Offizielle Top 100)	3
Irish Independent Albums (IRMA)	13
New Zealand Albums (RMNZ)	39
Scottish Albums (Official Charts)	4
Swiss Albums (Schweizer Hitparade)	48
UK Albums (Official Charts)	6
UK Independent Albums (Official Charts)	1
