= Billy Nomates (album) =

Studio album by Billy Nomates
- Released: 7 August 2020
- Studio: Invada Studios (Bristol)
- Genre: Electronic; rock
- Length: 32:55
- Label: Invada Records

Billy Nomates chronology
Billy Nomates (2020)	Cacti (2023)

Singles from Billy Nomates
- 1. "No" Released: 11 March 2020; 2. "FNP" Released: 1 June 2020; 3. "Hippy Elite" Released: 10 July 2020

Billy Nomates is the self-titled debut studio album by English musician and songwriter Tor Maries, who performs under the stage name Billy Nomates. It was released on 7 August 2020 through Invada Records.

The album features a verse written and performed by Jason Williamson from Sleaford Mods, the band who inspired Maries to return to writing music and who later reciprocally featured her on their single "Mork N Mindy" the same year.

Maries performs vocals, guitar, bass and synths, with additional contributions by Rich Leicester on bass and Bill Maries on drums. The album was recorded with Portishead's Geoff Barrow, founder of Invada Records.

== Critical reception ==
Professional ratings
Review scores
Source	Rating
Robert Christgau	A
The Irish Times	3/5 stars
Loud and Quiet	7/10

Billy Nomates received generally positive reviews, being selected as radio DJ Amy Lamé's album of the year on BBC Radio 6 Music, as well as 'One to watch' by The Guardian's Laura Snape and also making Brooklyn Vegan's top albums of the year list.

The NME stated how the "sparse, self-styled DIY arrangements" of the album would "play well alongside the likes of Patti Smith and Eleanor Friedberg", while Clash described the second single "FNP" as a "biting return".

On 27 August 2020, the album was selected as Album of the Day on BBC Radio 6Music.

In an interview with BrooklynVegan, Jason Williamson of Sleaford Mods described the single "No" as "a masterpiece".

== Track listing ==
All tracks are written by Tor Maries. Additional verse on "Supermarket Sweep" written by Jason Williamson.

Billy Nomates track listing
No.	Title	Length
1.	"Modern Hart"	2:24
2.	"Hippy Elite"	2:48
3.	"Happy Misery"	2:10
4.	"No"	2:58
5.	"Supermarket Sweep" (featuring Jason Williamson)	2:58
6.	"FNP"	3:39
7.	"Mudslinger"	3:06
8.	"Call in Sick"	3:44
9.	"Fat White Man"	3:28
10.	"Wild Arena"	2:43
11.	"Escape Artist"	2:54
Total length:		32:55

== Personnel ==
Musicians

- Tor Maries – vocals, guitar, bass, synthesizer
- Rich Leicester – bass (tracks 1, 3, 4, 11)
- Bill Maries – live drums (tracks 2–4)
- Jason Williamson – additional vocals (track 5)

Technical

- Stu Matthews – mixing (tracks 1–3, 5–11)
- Geoff Barrow – mixing (tracks 1–3, 5–11)
- James Trevascus – mixing (track 4), mastering
- Tor Maries – mixing (all tracks)
- Marc Bessant – design
- Cindy Sasha – photography, imagery
