= Tiswas EP =

EP by Sleaford Mods
- Released: 24 November 2014
- Recorded: 2014
- Genres: Post-punk; hip-hop; funk
- Length: 14:27
- Label: Invada
- Producer: Andrew Fearn

Sleaford Mods chronology
Divide and Exit (2014)	Tiswas EP (2014)	Key Markets (2015)

Tiswas EP is the debut extended play by the English duo Sleaford Mods, released on 24 November 2014 through Invada Records and produced by Andrew Fearn. The record takes its name from its title track that previously appeared on the band's previous album Divide and Exit (2014), which is in turn a reference to Tiswas, the UK children's television show from the 1970s and 1980s.

The remainder of the EP features four original tracks, which show the band incorporating elements of hip-hop and funk with the use of Fearn's minimalist backing tracks, whilst Jason Williamson's vocals and lyrics focus more on a dark and direct approach, often referencing popular figures and places. Tiswas EP was met with positive reviews upon release and peaked at no. 48 on the UK Physical Singles Chart.

== Background and recording ==
The EP contains five songs recorded in England in 2014, all of which are original pieces with the exception of the title track, previously appearing on the acclaimed Divide and Exit (2014) which saw the band gain significant popularity. Shortly before the release of Tiswas EP, Jason Williamson quit his office job to focus full-time on music.

== Composition ==
Aside from the title track, the four original pieces on Tiswas EP feature a more minimal musical backing by Andrew Fearn, and the tone is darker overall, with Williamson opting for a more lyrically direct approach compared to previous releases. Consequently, the record relies less on humour, though not without the occasional moments of levity, such as on the EP's closer.

The opener and title track "Tiswas" is named after Tiswas, a children's show from the 1970s and 1980s in the UK. Williamson sings over a predominantly post-punk backing track with lyrics making fun of, for example, the guitar shop culture of Denmark Street. The second song "Bunch of Cunts" is a hip-hop track consisting of sparse, looping drum beats with Williamson's ranting vocals on top. In the song, he references Dr. Dre and his line of headphones. To further contrast, "The Demon" incorporates elements of funk music, and Williamson shifts his focus onto the contemporary war industry. Returning to a hip-hop-inspired style with a minimal bassline and drum loops, "The Mail Don't Fail" offers criticism of The Daily Mail and its political influence. The closer "6 Horsemen (The Brixtons)" takes aim at pop culture figures, particularly Johnny Borrell of Razorlight.

== Promotion and release ==
In late October 2014, Sleaford Mods revealed a music video for "Tiswas". The promotional single was in anticipation of the then-upcoming extended play, to be released on 24 November 2014 through Invada Records. Later, on Record Store Day 2015, the record was additionally made available on a 12-inch picture disc and was limited to a thousand copies. The following week, the EP charted on the UK Physical Singles Chart at no. 48.

== Critical reception ==
Professional ratings
Review scores
Source	Rating
AllMusic	4/5 stars
Drowned in Sound	8/10
Louder Than War	8/10
NME	4/5 stars

Rating Tiswas EP 8 out of 10 for Louder Than War, Simon Tucker said that after the band's most recent album Divide and Exit, "it would be easy for some" to assume that it would consist of outtakes "deemed unsuitable to its parent album", but Tucker thought that Williamson's "lyrics feel even more direct and brutal than any of their other releases and is yet another example that the duo are developing at a rapid rate." AllMusic's Heather Phares felt that, overall, the EP "reflects Sleaford Mods' quick wit and even quicker growth". While Phares found that the duo were "notably darker" and "even more furious than they were earlier in the year", they highlighted the record's more humorous moments, particularly on the title track and "6 Horsemen (The Brixtons)".

Jack Doherty of Drowned in Sound also singled out "6 Horsemen" by saying "It takes some skill to be hilarious, scary and damn right-on in the space of a three minute pop song, but Sleaford Mods have proved that they can deliver on all fronts." Doherty elsewhere stated in their 8 out of 10 review that "It's ridiculously refreshing to hear a group rant so viciously about the banality of modern life." In a four star review for the NME, Noel Gardner praised the duo's approach to the subject matter, saying that "In the hands of almost anyone else, these subjects would spell disaster", and that Jason Williamson "confirms that no one else in the game says 'fuck all' or 'mate' with such exacting relish."

== Track listing ==
All tracks are written by Andrew Fearn and Jason Williamson.

Tiswas EP track listing
No.	Title	Length
1.	"Tiswas"	3:12
2.	"Bunch of Cunts"	2:23
3.	"The Demon"	2:58
4.	"The Mail Don't Fail"	3:03
5.	"6 Horsemen (The Brixtons)"	2:51
Total length:		14:27

== Personnel ==
Credits are adapted from the vinyl liner notes, except where noted.

- Andrew Fearn – programming and production
- Jason Williamson – vocals
- Johnny O – design
- Jake Ashpole – back sleeve photography

== Charts ==
Chart performance for Tiswas EP
Chart (2015)	Peak position
UK Physical Singles (OCC)	48
