= Sleaford Mods (EP) =

EP by Sleaford Mods
- Released: 14 September 2018
- Recorded: 2018
- Studios: JT Soar, Nottingham
- Length: 15:03
- Label: Rough Trade

Sleaford Mods chronology
English Tapas (2017)	Sleaford Mods (2018)	Eton Alive (2019)

Singles from Sleaford Mods
- 1. "Stick in a Five and Go" Released: 31 July 2018

Sleaford Mods is the third extended play by the English duo Sleaford Mods, (Note: Not to be confused with Sleaford Mods' 2007 self-titled debut album.) released on 14 September 2018 through Rough Trade Records. Recorded earlier that year, the EP was preceded by the single "Stick in a Five and Go" and reached no. 42 in the UK Albums Chart.

== Recording and composition ==
The EP was recorded in Nottingham at studio JT Soar in 2018. On the lead tracks "Stick in a Five and Go" and "Bang Someone Out", vocalist Jason Williamson created the songs as outlets for his more violent imaginations, which are a result of both the political aftermath of Brexit and what he described as "historical flaws in my personality". The lyrics on "Gallows Hill" are based on the history of a war cemetery in Nottingham. Originally written as a song, Williamson adapted it into a short story, included as one of thirteen in his book Happy Days released later in 2018. The fourth track, "Dregs", refers to Williamson's time working as a glass collector in a Nottingham bar where he would often drink the patrons' leftovers, and the closer, "Joke Shop", was originally not intended to be included as part of the EP; Williamson was ultimately encouraged by his manager Steve Underwood to add one more piece that showed the group was open to experimentation.

== Release and singles ==
Coinciding with the announcement for the EP, Sleaford Mods was preceded by the single "Stick in a Five and Go" on 31 July 2018. Backed by a bassline and an electronic beat, "Stick in a Five and Go" details a revenge fantasy. In the plot, after reading a confrontational comment on Twitter, Jason Williamson finds the user's address, poses as a postman for the Royal Mail with a fake package, and drives to their home to goad the commenter into a real life confrontation, repeating "Sign for it mate".

Sleaford Mods was released on 14 September 2018 through Rough Trade Records, about a year and a half after their album English Tapas (2017). It peaked on the UK Albums Chart at no. 42, additionally placing on the Scottish Albums and UK Independent Albums Charts at no. 20 and 8, respectively.

== Critical reception ==
Professional ratings
Review scores
Source	Rating
AllMusic	4/5 stars
PopMatters	8/10
The Skinny	4/5 stars

In a review for AllMusic, Heather Phares considered Sleaford Mods to be "As vivid, eloquent, and artfully ugly as any of their full-lengths," and that, referencing the quality of their previous EPs, it "proves once again that there's no such thing as a stopgap release in Fearn and Williamson's world. Randal Doane of PopMatters rated Sleaford Mods 8 out of 10 and called it "a solid EP and a key cultural artifact for what looks increasingly like a hard Brexit." In a four star review for The Skinny, Lewis Wade said that "while there's a bit more variation in the instrumentation than usual it's still very much what you'd expect", highlighting the "barnstorming" opener and lead single "Stick in a Five and Go" as "the EP's best" track.

== Track listing ==
All lyrics are written by Jason Williamson, except "Bang Someone Out" (Williamson, Nail); all music is composed by Andrew Fearn.

Sleaford Mods track listing
No.	Title	Length
1.	"Stick in a Five and Go"	3:53
2.	"Bang Someone Out"	3:32
3.	"Gallows Hill"	2:21
4.	"Dregs"	2:27
5.	"Joke Shop"	2:50
Total length:		15:03

== Personnel ==
Credits are adapted from the CD liner notes and Tidal.

- Jason Williamson – vocals
- Andrew Fearn – programming
- Matt Colton – mastering at Alchemy, London
- Duncan Stafford – photography

== Charts ==
Chart performance for Sleaford Mods
Chart (2018)	Peak position
Scottish Albums (OCC)	20
UK Albums (OCC)	42
UK Independent Albums (OCC)	8
