= Mork n Mindy =

Single by Sleaford Mods featuring Billy Nomates

from the album Spare Ribs
- B-side: "Little Bits (featuring Extnddntwrk)"
- Released: October 30, 2020
- Genre: Post-punk; alternative dance; hip hop
- Length: 3:24
- Label: Rough Trade Records
- Songwriters: Jason Williamson, Billy Nomates, and Andrew Fearn

Sleaford Mods featuring Billy Nomates singles chronology
"Second" (2020)	"Mork n Mindy" (2020)

"Mork n Mindy" is a single released by the band Sleaford Mods on 30 October 2020, featuring Billy Nomates on guest vocals. The song was written in January 2020. The single is on their 2021 album Spare Ribs.

The single is accompanied by a music video directed by Ben Wheatley, uploaded by the band to YouTube on the release date. The music video has the two band members Jason Williamson and Andrew Fearn and featuring artist Billy Nomates performing the song.

The single reached the top of the UK Vinyl Singles Chart on November 27, 2020.

== Track listing ==
single
No.	Title	Length
1.	"Mork n Mindy" (featuring Billy Nomates)	3:24
2.	"Little Bits" (featuring Extnddntwrk)	3:20
