= Spare rib (disambiguation) =

Spare rib is a type of meat.

Spare rib may also refer to:

- Spare Rib, a magazine in the United Kingdom
- Spare Ribs, a 2021 album by Sleaford Mods
