= Furancho =

Galician food establishment

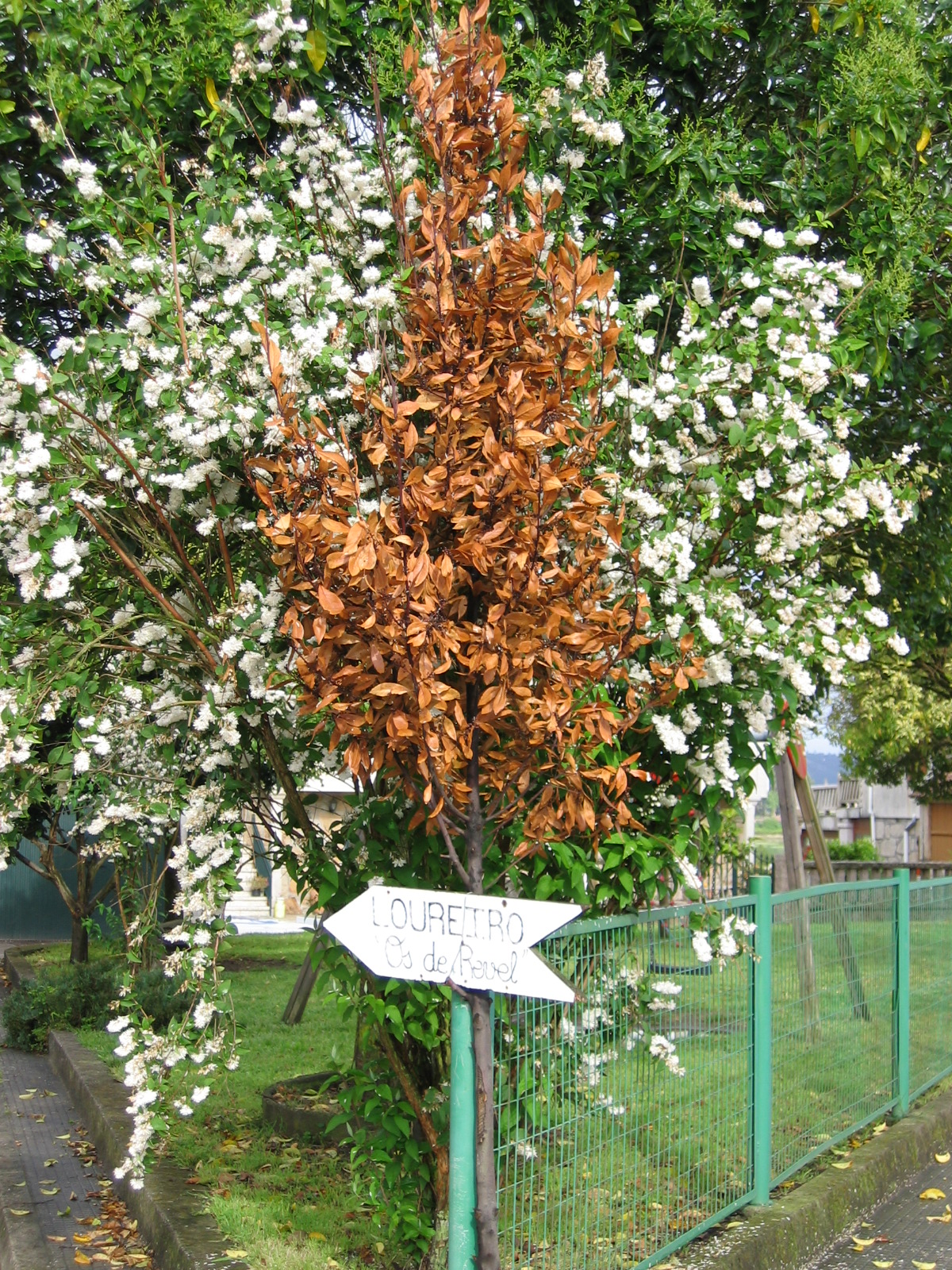
Dry laurel branch and homemade sign indicating a furancho.

A furancho is a seasonal food establishment found in Galicia, Spain, particularly common in the Rías Baixas region, where people gather to enjoy homemade wine accompanied by traditional tapas dishes. They are also known as loureiros, a name that comes from the laurel branches traditionally hung at the entrance of homes to signal that food was being served there.

Furanchos started as an informal, semi-clandestine way for individuals to sell surplus wine produced for their own use, typically among neighbours. They are typically set up in wine cellars, garages, or other unused ground-floor spaces, with very basic seating and minimal furnishings, where diners often eat shoulder to shoulder.

Following the COVID-19 pandemic, many restaurant owners, whose businesses were seriously affected, voiced concerns over perceived unfair competition. In response, furanchos are now regulated by the regional government, which restricts the dishes that may be served and sets limits on their operating dates. Despite this, many rustic-style restaurants present themselves as furanchos while offering dishes and drinks outside the regulations. Permitted dishes are limited to charcuterie boards, Padron peppers, pig's ear, zorza, ribs, egg and chips, grilled sardines or squid, callos, Spanish tortilla, empanada and croquettes.

These dishes are accompanied by either red or white house wine served directly from a barrel: red wine is usually drunk from a small, white ceramic bowl known as a cunca, while white wine is served in a short, wide glass called a carolino. A furancho remains open only for as long as the current wine supply lasts, closing once the barrels have been emptied.

== See also ==
- Albariño – a white grape variety native to the region
- Rías Baixas DO – a regional protected wine designation
