= O'Joy! =

EP by Big Special
- Released: 5 June 2026
- Length: 31:02
- Label: SO
- Producers: Michael Clarke; Big Special

Big Special chronology
National Average (2025)	O'Joy! (2026)

Singles from O'Joy!
- 1. "Plaintive Native" Released: 15 October 2025; 2. "Dragged Up a Hill (And Thrown Down the Other Side)" Released: 26 November 2025; 3. "Sluglife" Released: 7 January 2026; 4. "Only Free When Sleeping" Released: 15 April 2026

O'Joy! (stylised in all caps) is the third extended play by the English duo Big Special. It was released on 5 June 2026 through SO Recordings and was produced and written with Michael Clarke. The EP consists of reworked material that was originally written for their first two albums but was excluded primarily for being too dark. The songs are largely focused on the duo's disillusionment with the world and the UK in particular.

The EP was led by four singles, three of which preceded the record's announcement. It was released to positive critical reception and reached no. 13 on the UK Independent Albums Chart.

== Background ==
The record consists of songs written for but excluded from their first two albums, Postindustrial Hometown Blues (2024) and National Average (2025), based not just on album length, but also based on concerns that the addition of the songs in would have shifted the overall tone into darker territory than intended. Ostensibly, O'Joy! a collection of outtakes, but when the duo were forming the EP, they went back to the studio and reworked the material in order to provide a sense of overall cohesion. Because of the songs' origins, they chose to classify the ten-track record as an EP rather than an album. Callum Moloney, one half of Big Special, told Flood Magazine that by releasing O'Joy!, they were "drawing a line under the first era of Big Special". The EP is dedicated to the memory of their friend, Handsome James Borrer.

== Composition ==
Compared to their previous work, O'Joy! more heavily focuses on disillusionment. In particular, it is centered on their feelings towards the current state of the UK, communicated through generally straightforward lyrics. After an introduction of synthesized voices, the EP continues with "Plaintive Native", a politically-charged song that is largely rooted in industrial music and features loud, frustrated-sounding vocals. The hip-hop-adjacent "Only Free When Sleeping" is a beat-driven track with saxophone and Hicklin's near-spoken word vocal delivery. The lyrics refer to the experience of being inundated by bad news, only achieving some respite while asleep. The next track, "Lazarus", features Moloney's prominent drums over the chorus. Hicklin's spoken word later takes the lead over sparse instrumentation on the next track, "The Wake", the shortest song on the record.

Following "Family Bones", a song based on electronic drums and a bass hook, "Garden of Fools" shifts the mood into more somber territory, gradually phasing in more varied instrumentation, from whistling to bagpipes. The song talks about working class issues and how people have historically left their home countries in the hopes of imporoving their lives. The subsequent track "Sluglife", which includes acoustic guitar, leans more into a western music sound as it progresses. The penultimate "Dragged Up a Hill (And Thrown Down the Other Side)" is about the struggles a living a repetitive life without seeing improvement. The folk-tinged song is another moment in the EP where Hicklin's vocals take the lead. O'Joy! ends with "Hotel", which, in contrast to the record as a whole, is considerably more upbeat and positive, with the song encouraging listeners to leave the past behind them. The track is interspersed with the sounds of a loud, distorted guitar.

== Singles and release ==
Preceding the EP's announcement, Big Special released a number of singles that would ultimately appear on O'Joy!, starting with "Plaintive Native" on 15 October 2025, followed by "Dragged Up a Hill (And Thrown Down the Other Side)" on 26 November and "Sluglife" on 7 January 2026. The EP was announced on 15 April 2026 alongside one more single, "Only Free When Sleeping". Released on 5 June 2026 via SO Recordings, O'Joy! subsequently charted on the UK Independent and Scottish Albums Charts at no. 13 and no. 28, respectively.

== Critical reception ==
Professional ratings
Review scores
Source	Rating
Distorted Sound	8/10
DIY	4/5 stars
Dork	4/5 stars

In a pair of four-star reviews, DIY's Cal Chapman said the record demonstrates the "breadth and depth" of the duo's experimentation, and Harry Shaw of Dork magazine thought that the collection shows what the benefits of "letting the misfits breathe" can look like. Rating O'Joy! eight out of ten, Ed Walton of Distorted Sound praised the lyrics for being forthright rather than escapist, saying that although "the depressing nature of the EP begins to take its toll on you", the record "isn't a fun listen, but a necessary one" overall. As highlights, they singled out "Garden of Fools" for its commentary on the working class and "Dragged Up a Hill" for Hicklin's emotional delivery of the frustrations of a repetitive life.

== Track listing ==
All tracks are written by Big Special and Michael Clarke.

O'Joy! track listing
No.	Title	Length
1.	"★★"	0:18
2.	"Plaintive Native"	3:18
3.	"Only Free When Sleeping"	2:59
4.	"Lazarus"	3:16
5.	"The Wake"	1:52
6.	"Family Bones"	3:30
7.	"Garden of Fools"	3:14
8.	"Sluglife"	4:43
9.	"Dragged Up a Hill (And Thrown Down the Other Side)"	4:29
10.	"Hotel"	3:19
Total length:		31:02

== Personnel ==
Except where noted, credits are adapted from the CD liner notes.

=== Big Special ===
- Joe Hicklin – vocals, production, art direction, graphic design
- Callum Moloney – drums, production

=== Additional contributors ===
- Fraser Brown – trumpet on "Garden of Fools"
- Michael Clarke – production
- Jason Mitchell – mastering
- Stuart Ford – art direction, graphic design

== Charts ==
Chart performance for O'Joy!
Chart (2026)	Peak position
Scottish Albums (OCC)	28
UK Albums Sales (OCC)	27
UK Independent Albums (OCC)	13
