= Metalhorse =

Studio album by Billy Nomates
- Released: 16 May 2025
- Studio: Paco Loco (El Puerto de Santa María); Invada (Bristol)
- Length: 36:30
- Label: Invada
- Producer: James Trevascus

Billy Nomates chronology
Cacti (2023)	Metalhorse (2025)

Singles from Metalhorse
- 1. "The Test" Released: 5 March 2025

Metalhorse is the third studio album by English musician Billy Nomates. It was released on 16 May 2025, by Invada Records, in CD, digital, vinyl, and cassette formats. The album received favourable ratings from multiple publications including Clash.

== Background ==
Incorporating elements of synth-pop, punk, blues, country, folk, and electro, the album revolves around the themes of loss and insecurity. It consists of eleven songs ranging between one and five minutes each with a total runtime of approximately thirty-six minutes, and it was produced by James Trevascus. It was preceded by Nomates' 2023 record, Cacti. "The Test" was released as the album's lead single on 5 March 2025.

== Reception ==
Professional ratings
Review scores
Source	Rating
AllMusic	4/5 stars
Clash	9/10 stars
Dork	3/5 stars
The Line of Best Fit	7/10 stars
Louder Than War	4/5 stars
Mojo	4/5 stars
MusicOMH	4/5 stars

The album was given a rating of nine out of ten by Emma Harrison of Clash, who described it as "an emotionally resonant piece of work that is vital, vivid and showcases why Billy NoMates is an undisputed 'Tor' de force." It was given four stars and referred to as "testimony to the fact that whatever doesn't kill you does indeed make you stronger," by British magazine MusicOMH. AllMusic described the album as "inspiring and often brilliant," rating it four out of five.

Mojo referred to it as "Maries' best yet," giving it a four-star rating. Louder Than War rated the album four out of five, noting "The ambition and scope of this record will take many by surprise." The Line of Best Fit gave it seven out of ten and remarked, "Metalhorse largely succeeds in conveying the pushing and pulling through life."

The album was given a rating of three out of five by Dork, which stated, "The album's conceptual framework – that crumbling funfair metaphor – provides a perfect backdrop for exploring life's precarious thrills and inevitable losses."

== Track listing ==
All tracks are written by Tor Maries.

Metalhorse track listing
No.	Title	Length
1.	"Metalhorse"	4:49
2.	"Nothin Worth Winnin"	3:14
3.	"The Test"	3:50
4.	"Override"	3:28
5.	"Dark Horse Friend" (featuring Hugh Cornwell)	3:30
6.	"Life's Unfair"	1:58
7.	"Plans"	3:14
8.	"Gas"	3:10
9.	"Comedic Timing"	3:34
10.	"Strange Gift"	2:54
11.	"Moon Explodes"	2:49
Total length:		36:30

== Personnel ==
Credits adapted from the album's liner notes.

- Tor Maries – vocals, piano, synthesiser, guitars, co-production
- Mandy Clarke – bass
- Liam Chapman – drums, percussion
- Hugh Cornwell – backing vocals on "Dark Horse Friend"
- James Trevascus – production, recording, mixing, engineering
- Justin Perkins – mastering
- Paco Martinez – engineering assistance
- Stu Matthews – engineering assistance
- Tom Skipp – art direction, design, photography
- Naomi Lake – makeup

== Charts ==
Chart performance for Metalhorse
Chart (2025)	Peak position
Scottish Albums (OCC)	23
UK Album Downloads (OCC)	9
UK Independent Albums (OCC)	4
