= Egg and chips =

Popular dish in the United Kingdom

Fried eggs and chips, served with baked beans

Egg and chips is a popular dish in the United Kingdom, consisting simply of fried eggs served with chips.

== Associations ==
Egg and chips became popular in Britain during the First World War due to a shortage of meat. It was a favourite food of Tommies behind the lines on the Western Front in northern France and Belgium, eaten at establishments "estaminet", which also sold cheap wine and beer.

Egg and chips is associated with a working class diet. In an article on moving from the working class to the middle class, a British journalist recounted that "There are things I grew up with that I still love—pub life, darts, egg and chips". Jack Charlton, after playing in the World Cup-winning England football team in 1966, remarked: "We stopped the car for egg and chips in a transport cafe. We'd eaten nothing but the best food for weeks and I was dying for some ordinary grub." The image of British people insisting on ordering egg and chips while on holiday abroad has also been used as a stereotype.

== Health ==
In a study on the perceptions of social inequality of people in North West England, "Beer, fags, egg and chips" was highlighted by the researchers as an example of individual behaviour thought to be connected to poor health.

== Reception ==
Food writer Mary Cadogan says that "Egg and chips for me is a marriage made in heaven. Whenever I feel the need of a bit of comfort eating this is the dish I usually turn to." Heston Blumenthal, owner of the Michelin star award-winning restaurant The Fat Duck in Bray, Berkshire, wrote in The Guardian that "You can't get much more British a dish than fried egg and chips."

== In popular culture ==
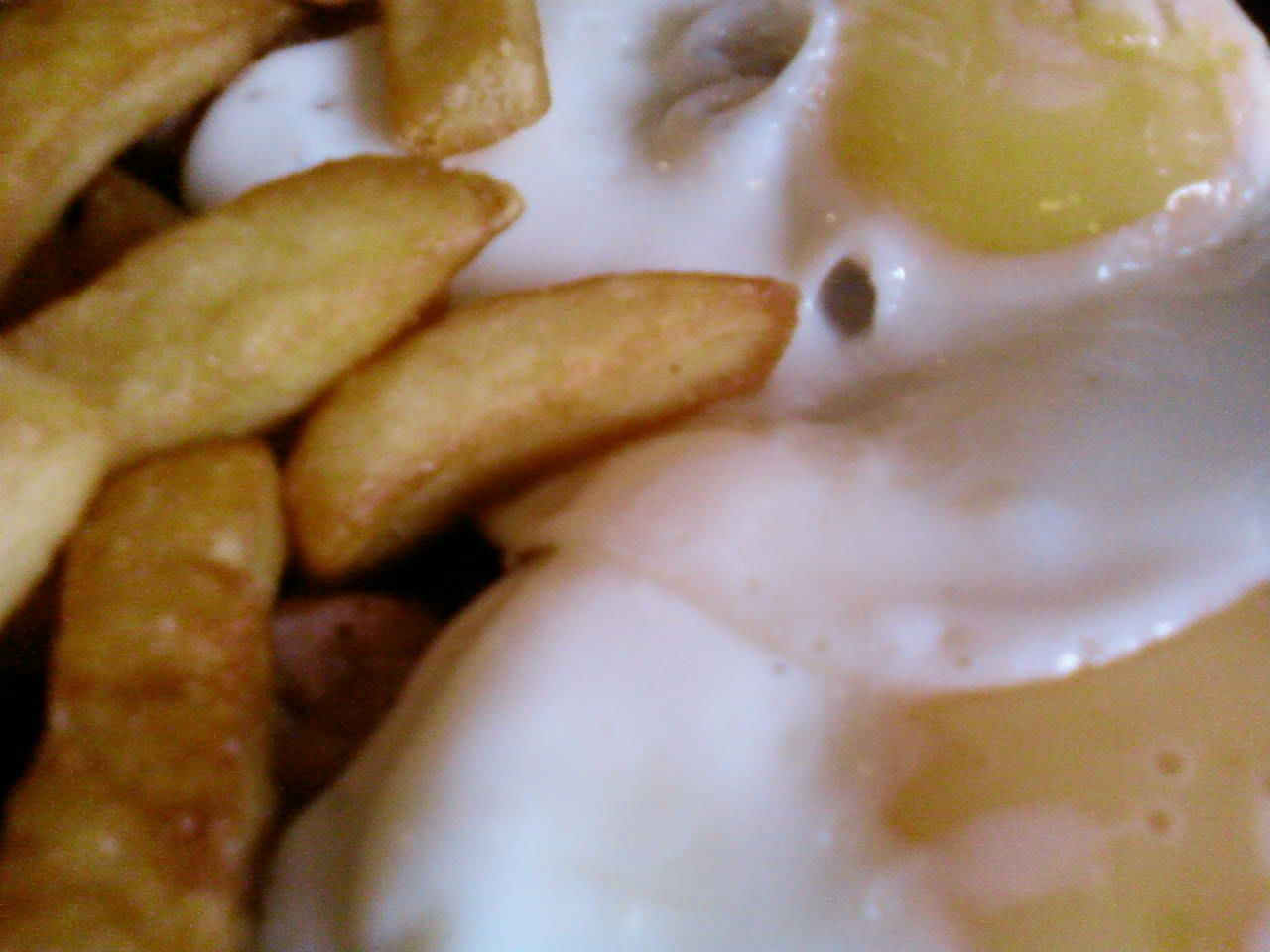
A close-up photograph of egg and chips

The dish features in art as well as in real life. Egg and chips occupies a pivotal moment in the suffocating life of a working class Liverpool housewife in the one-character play Shirley Valentine (1986). "Because it's Thursday, Shirley knows that Joe expects steak and chips for his tea. He is getting egg and chips instead... But Joe ... is not pleased at his meatless meal. He pushes his plate into her lap. That settles it. Two weeks later he comes home and finds an empty house."

The dish's status as a cornerstone of authentic British cuisine is solidified by its regular inclusion in modern popular culture. It features regularly in television depictions of British life, such as the long-running soap opera series Coronation Street, where it constitutes part of recurring character Johnny "Doc" Docherty's infamous catch phrase, "You've just had your tea, Lesley – Egg and Chips!"

In the video game Final Fantasy VII Remake (2020), on the back wall of the bar 7th Heaven, there is a neon sign which reads "EGGS & CHIPS".

A plate of egg and chips is featured on the front cover of the English musical duo Big Special's second studio album National Average (2025).

== See also ==
- Cafe (British)
- Full breakfast
- Breakfast sandwich
