= Postindustrial Hometown Blues =

Studio album by Big Special
- Released: 10 May 2024
- Studio: OX4 Sound (Oxford, England)
- Genre: Punk; soul; blues
- Length: 48:27
- Label: SO
- Producer: Michael Clarke; Big Special

Big Special chronology
Black Country Gothic (2022)	Postindustrial Hometown Blues (2024)	National Average (2025)

Singles from Postindustrial Hometown Blues
- 1. "Dust Off/Start Again" Released: 6 February 2024; 2. "Butcher's Bin" Released: 13 March 2024; 3. "Black Dog/White Horse" Released: 2 April 2024

Postindustrial Hometown Blues (stylised in all caps) is the debut studio album by the English punk duo Big Special. It was released on 10 May 2024 through SO Recordings and was produced by Michael Clarke and Big Special. The album received widespread critical acclaim upon release and reached no. 37 on the UK Albums Chart.

== Background and recording ==
Much of the album consists of songs that had been previously released as singles. After signing with SO Recordings, in May 2023 they released "Shithouse", which had previously appeared on their second EP Black Country Gothic (2022). That year, predating the album's announcement, three more singles followed: "This Here Ain't Water" in June, "Desperate Breakfast" in September, and "Trees" in December.

Drum parts were recorded at OX4 Sound in Oxford, England.

== Promotion and singles ==
Coinciding with the announcement for the album, Postindustrial Hometown Blues was officially led with the single "Dust Off/Start Again" on 6 February 2024, followed by "Butcher's Bin" on 13 March and "Black Dog/White Horse" on 2 April. The latter was provided a music video starring actress Kate Dickie on 25 April.

== Release ==
Postindustrial Hometown Blues was released on 10 May 2024 through SO Recordings. It peaked at no. 37 on the UK Albums Chart.

On 10 October, the duo released another single, "Stay Down, Lazarus". It is a collaboration with the American singer-songwriter John Grant, and was the first song Big Special had written. Although not included as part of the original release of Postindustrial Hometown Blues, it was on the deluxe edition, released on 21 February 2025. Bonus tracks also included acoustic and live versions, demos, and remixes.

== Critical reception ==
Professional ratings
Aggregate scores
Source	Rating
Metacritic	86/100
Review scores
Source	Rating
Clash	8/10
Classic Rock	8/10
Distorted Sound	9/10
DIY	4.5/5 stars
Dork	5/5
The Line of Best Fit	9/10
Louder Than War	5/5 stars
Mojo	4/5 stars
NME	4/5 stars
Uncut	8/10

According to the review aggregator Metacritic, Postindustrial Hometown Blues received "universal acclaim" based on a weighted average score of 86 out of 100 from 7 critic scores.

=== Year-end lists ===
Publication	List	Rank	Ref.
Louder Than War	Top 100 Albums of 2024	33	
Rough Trade UK	Albums of the Year 2024	12	

== Track listing ==
All tracks are written by Big Special.

Postindustrial Hometown Blues track listing
No.	Title	Length
1.	"Black Country Gothic"	2:58
2.	"I Mock Joggers"	2:03
3.	"Desperate Breakfast"	3:11
4.	"Shithouse"	4:49
5.	"This Here Ain't Water"	3:22
6.	"My Shape (Blocking the Light)"	3:22
7.	"Black Dog/White Horse"	3:09
8.	"Broadcast: Time Away"	2:31
9.	"Ill."	3:09
10.	"Mongrel"	1:30
11.	"Butcher's Bin"	4:01
12.	"Dust Off/Start Again"	3:44
13.	"Trees"	2:52
14.	"For the Birds"	2:03
15.	"Dig!"	5:43
Total length:		48:27

Deluxe edition bonus tracks
No.	Title	Length
16.	"Stay Down, Lazarus" (with John Grant)	3:24
17.	"Black Dog/White Horse" (acoustic version)	4:06
18.	"Trees" (acoustic demo 2022)	2:45
19.	"This Here Ain't Water" (early demo)	3:53
20.	"For the Birds" (Simon Scott Three Quarter Skies remix)	6:47
21.	"My Shape (Blocking the Light)" (Andy Bell Glok remix)	8:27
22.	"Black Dog/White Horse" (Sleaford Mods remix)	3:09
23.	"Dust Off/Start Again" (Robbie Major Benefits remix)	8:01
24.	"This Here Ain't Water" (Public Service Broadcasting remix)	5:02
25.	"Shithouse" (live from King Tut's Wah Wah Hut, Glasgow, Scotland 10/5/2024)	4:26
26.	"Dig!" (live from Espaco Unimed, São Paulo, Brazil 17/3/2024)	6:10
Total length:		104:37

== Personnel ==
Credits are adapted from the LP liner notes, except where noted.

=== Big Special ===
- Joe Hicklin – vocals, production, artwork, photographs
- Callum Moloney – drums, production

=== Additional contributors ===
- Fraser Brown – trumpet on "Dig!"
- Ronnie Clarke – additional vocals on "Dig!"
- Michael Clarke – production, mixing, recording
- Vince Von Van – engineering of drums (except "Trees"), mixing assistance
- Stu Macaulay – engineering of drums ("Trees")
- Jason Mitchell – mastering at Loud Mastering
- Isaac Watson, Billie Arnold – artwork, photographs

== Charts ==
Chart performance for Postindustrial Hometown Blues
Chart (2024)	Peak position
Scottish Albums (OCC)	6
UK Albums (OCC)	37
UK Independent Albums (OCC)	2
