= National Average (album) =

Studio album by Big Special
- Released: 4 July 2025
- Recorded: December 2024–March 2025
- Genres: Punk; funk
- Length: 46:01
- Label: SO
- Producer: Michael Clarke

Big Special chronology
Postindustrial Hometown Blues (2024)	National Average (2025)	O'Joy! (2026)

National Average (stylised as NATIONAL AVERAGE.) is the second studio album by the English punk duo Big Special. It was surprise-released on 4 July 2025 through SO Recordings and was produced by Michael Clarke.

The album, compared to their debut Postindustrial Hometown Blues from the previous year, sees the duo expand upon their sound in a more funk-based approach. It received positive reviews upon release and peaked at no. 53 on the UK Albums Chart.

== Background and composition ==
In December 2024, following an extensive tour in support of their debut full-length Postindustrial Hometown Blues, Big Special began working on their next album. They started out by recording a number of jams, taking bits from those sessions to later build upon and supplementing them with Joe Hicklin's lyrics which were either written on the spot or sourced from notes from the tour. Eventually, they had twenty-five songs to choose from, reduced the number to thirteen, and finished the album by March 2025. Overall, National Average sees the duo expand upon their sound whilst retaining the dark sense of humour of their previous work. Stylistically, it is a shift toward a more funk-based style that keeps the punk elements that the duo were typically known for.

Opening National Average is "The Mess", a story about hope and, according to Big Special, likely the oldest track. Unlike the majority of the album, it was based on a demo as opposed to a studio jam session. Following the funk-influenced "God Save the Pony"—the last written for the album—"Hug a Bastard" is a song about self-reflection, created during the duo's first jam session. On "Shop Music", Hicklin addresses the dichotomy between artistic expression and expectations placed by the music industry. In "Pigs Puddin", the titular food is used as metaphor, described in The Line of Best Fit as "a fever dream of the scars of scraping by". "Professionals" deals with Hicklin's realisations about what it means to be successful, and "Get Back Safe" is a song about the expectations placed upon Hicklin's brother who had recently become a father.

One of the album's most punk-based songs is "Yesboss" wherein Hicklin rants about an unpleasant boss. "Domestic Bliss", another heavily funk-inspired song, contains a saxophone solo by Maruja's Joe Carroll. "Judas Song", as the title implies, is about betrayal. After "The Beast", another self-reflective piece, and the autobiographical "I Once Had a Kestrel", the latter delivered in spoken word, the closer "Thin Horses" features Rachel Goswell of Slowdive on vocals. According to Moloney, they had "known her for years" and thought that "It felt natural to bring in a second voice to give more weight to each lyric as the song builds, and we wanted it to be one that would match the fragile vulnerability of the song."

== Title and artwork ==
The album's title is primarily a reference to how, as a band, Hicklin and Moloney had deviated in recent years from a more "normal" British life. In an interview for Clash, Moloney told the magazine that "it's about watching our normal lives get further and further in the past" and that "It's just about coming to terms with being isolated in the experience we're having." In a separate interview for DIY, he added that the title is also a statement about how regional distinctions in British culture have been gradually fading in favour of the more dominant London culture.

The cover artwork features a plate of egg and chips, cooked by Joe Hicklin's father, Michael Hicklin.

== Promotion and release ==
Unaccompanied by a lead single or official promotional campaign prior, National Average was surprise-released on 4 July 2025 through SO Recordings, just more than a year after their debut album Postindustrial Hometown Blues. In the days leading up to its release, the only hints were a series of projections of the record's artwork onto various London buildings and structures, including the Tate Modern, the London Bridge, the Shoreditch High Street railway station, and Buckingham Palace. Additionally, Moloney has said that they "also projected a 'national average' length ruler onto a handful of London’s most phallic shaped buildings". Upon its release, Big Special revealed a music video for the promotional single "God Save the Pony". It subsequently peaked at no. 53 on the UK Albums Chart.

== Critical reception ==
Professional ratings
Review scores
Source	Rating
Classic Rock Italia	7/10
DIY	4.5/5 stars
The Line of Best Fit	9/10
Louder Than War	4.5/5 stars
MusicOMH	4/5 stars

In a four-and-a-half star review for DIY, Sarah Jamieson called National Average "A blistering, razor-witted record" and thought that the band's sense of humour was "spectacularly on the money for the nation's current mood." Wayne Carey of Louder Than War gave National Average the same rating and called it "dark", "exhilarating", and an "excellent album that puts Big Special on the map of great duos producing some of the best music around at the moment". In The Line of Best Fit, Alex Lee Thomson considered it "just as dense and darkly funny as their debut, concluding the 9 out of 10 review to say that while it's a "more complex" record, it "isn't an easy album, but it's another necessary one."

=== Year-end lists ===
Publication	List	Rank	Ref.
Louder Than War	Top 100 Albums of 2025	54	
Rough Trade	Albums of the Year 2025	85	

== Track listing ==
All lyrics are written by Joseph Hicklin; all music is composed by Big Special and Michael Clarke.

National Average track listing
No.	Title	Length
1.	"The Mess"	3:41
2.	"God Save the Pony"	3:10
3.	"Hug a Bastard"	4:11
4.	"Shop Music"	3:55
5.	"Pigs Puddin"	2:17
6.	"Professionals"	3:33
7.	"Get Back Safe"	3:52
8.	"Yesboss"	3:30
9.	"Domestic Bliss"	3:51
10.	"Judas Song"	3:35
11.	"The Beast"	4:17
12.	"I Once Had a Kestrel"	1:06
13.	"Thin Horses" (feat. Rachel Goswell)	5:03
Total length:		46:01

== Personnel ==
Credits are adapted from the LP liner notes, except where noted.

=== Big Special ===
- Joseph Hicklin – lead vocals
- Callum Moloney – drums

=== Additional personnel ===
- Joseph Alfred Carroll – saxophone on "Domestic Bliss"
- Rachel Goswell – vocals on "Thin Horses"
- Michael Clarke – production, mixing
- Jason Mitchell – mastering
- Michael Hicklin – egg and chips
- Isaac Watson – band photograph
- Black Country Type – art direction and sleeve photograph
- Alfie Hicks – graphic design

== Charts ==
Chart performance for National Average
Chart (2025)	Peak position
Scottish Albums (OCC)	20
UK Albums (OCC)	53
UK Independent Albums (OCC)	1
