= Big Special =

English musical duo

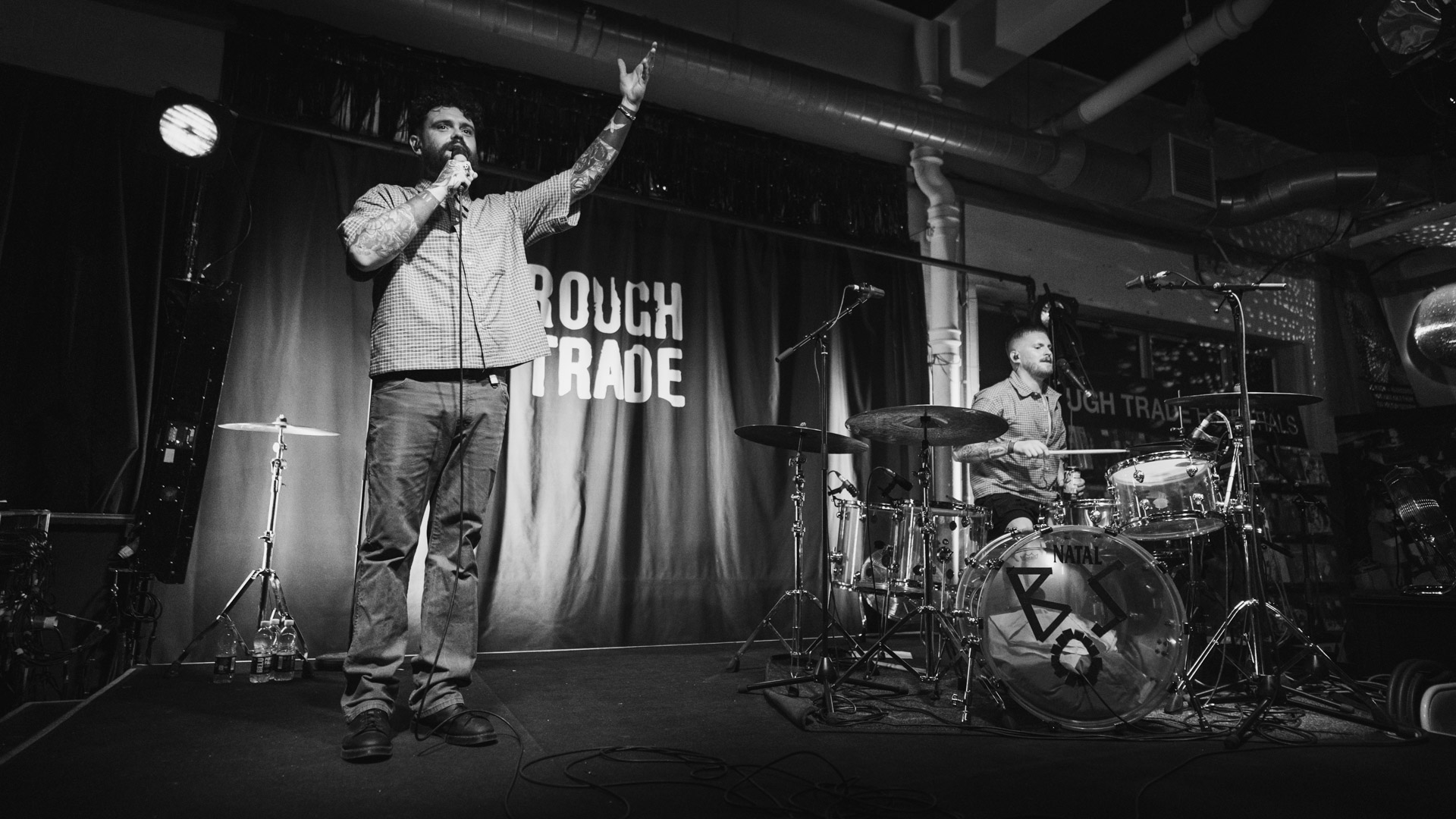
- Big Special at Rough Trade East in 2025. From left to right: Joe Hicklin and Callum Moloney.

Background information
- Origin: The Black Country, West Midlands, England
- Years active: 2022–present
- Label: SO Recordings
- Members: Joe Hicklin; Callum Moloney
- Website: bigspecial.co.uk

Big Special are a musical duo from the Black Country in the English West Midlands, consisting of vocalist Joe Hicklin and drummer Callum Moloney.

== History ==
Moloney is from Birmingham, Britain's second-largest city, and Hicklin grew up in nearby Walsall. The two first met aged 17 years old, more than a decade before Big Special was formed.

Hicklin began working on the music for what would become Big Special during the COVID-19 lockdowns, which lasted from March 2020 to around May the next year. He sent a demo of the track "This Here Ain't Water" to Moloney, who was playing drums in wedding bands at the time, to persuade him to join the new outfit. They were signed to SO Recordings in December 2022.

After signing with SO Recordings, in May 2023 they released "Shithouse", which had previously appeared on their second EP Black Country Gothic (2022). on 6 December 2023, the single "Trees", was released. Following its underground acclaim, the duo went on to release three more singles in 2024: "Dust Off/Start Again" on 6 February alongside the announcement of their debut album, "Butcher's Bin" on 13 March, and "Black Dog/White Horse" on 2 April. In the midst of these singles, their first LP, Postindustrial Hometown Blues, was released on 10 May.

In October 2024, they released a single, "Stay Down, Lazarus", a collaboration with John Grant. The track, despite being the first written for Big Special, was not featured on the base edition of Postindustrial Hometown Blues. It was, however, present on the deluxe edition, which also contained acoustic versions, demos, and remixes of album tracks. It was released in February 2025.

Following their debut, the duo continued to perform at various venues before releasing their sophomore album, National Average, on 4 July 2025 with no promotion or prior announcement. This release strategy would continue on their following two singles: "Plaintive Native", released on 15 October, and "Dragged Up a Hill (And Thrown Down the Other Side)", on 26 November.

They were featured, along with actress Gwendoline Christie, on the Sleaford Mods single "The Good Life", which was released in October 2025. Sleaford Mods frontman Jason Williamson said he brought Big Special in because he felt he "couldn't cut the chorus".

On 15 April 2026, Big Special announced a new EP named O'Joy! with the new single "Only Free When Sleeping". The EP consists of previously unreleased songs from their first two albums, including the previously-released singles "Plaintive Native", "Dragged Up a Hill (And Thrown Down the Other Side)", and "Sluglife". It was released on 5 June 2026.

== Style ==
They have been described in the NME as making "vulnerable, soulful punk", and by another reviewer as "intertwining punk with poetry". They have been widely referred to as a punk outfit, and even described as a "hip-hop duo", but the pair said in 2024 that their music did not fit easily into established genres. Hicklin has said that he needs the creative freedom to draw on influences from soul, punk and hip hop.

Hicklin's vocals are sometimes reminiscent of soul, and at other times delivered in registers closer to spoken word poetry. The duo's lyrics often refer to working class life in the post-industrial Midlands and Hicklin's struggles with depression.

== Discography ==
=== Studio albums ===
List of studio albums
Title	Details	Peak chart positions		
Title	Details	UK	UK Indie	SCO
Postindustrial Hometown Blues	Released: 10 May 2024; Label: SO Recordings	37	2	6
National Average	Released: 4 July 2025; Label: SO Recordings	53	1	20

=== Extended plays ===
List of extended plays
Title	Details	Peak chart positions	
Title	Details	UK Indie	SCO
Doom Song	Released: 2022	—	—
Black Country Gothic	Released: 2022	—	—
O'Joy!	Released: 5 June 2026; Label: SO Recordings	13	28

=== Singles ===
List of singles
Title	Year	Album/EP	Ref.
"Dust Off/Start Again"	2024	Postindustrial Hometown Blues	
"Butcher's Bin"	2024	Postindustrial Hometown Blues	
"Black Dog/White Horse"	2024	Postindustrial Hometown Blues	
"Stay Down, Lazarus" (with John Grant)	2024	Postindustrial Hometown Blues (deluxe)	
"Plaintive Native"	2025	O'Joy!	
"Dragged Up a Hill (And Thrown Down the Other Side)"	2025	O'Joy!	
"Sluglife"	2026	O'Joy!	

=== Featured singles ===
List of featured singles
Title	Year	Artist	Album	Ref.
"The Good Life"	2025	Sleaford Mods	The Demise of Planet X	
