= UK Grim =

Studio album by Sleaford Mods
- Released: 10 March 2023
- Studios: JT Soar, Nottingham
- Genre: Electro-punk
- Length: 48:21
- Label: Rough Trade
- Producer: Andrew Fearn

Sleaford Mods chronology
Spare Ribs (2021)	UK Grim (2023)	More UK Grim (2023)

UK Grim is the twelfth studio album by English post-punk band Sleaford Mods. It was released on 10 March 2023 on the Rough Trade Records. Production was handled by Andrew Fearn. It features guest appearances from Florence Shaw (Dry Cleaning) and Perry Farrell and Dave Navarro (Jane's Addiction).

== Critical reception ==
Professional ratings
Aggregate scores
Source	Rating
AnyDecentMusic?	7.7/10
Metacritic	81/100
Review scores
Source	Rating
AllMusic	4/5 stars
Clash	9/10
DIY	3.5/5 stars
Gigwise	8/10 stars
Mojo	4/5 stars
musicOMH	3.5/5 stars
NME	4/5 stars
Record Collector	4/5 stars
The Telegraph	5/5 stars
Uncut	8/10

UK Grim was met with critical acclaim upon release. At Metacritic, which assigns a normalised rating out of 100 to reviews from mainstream publications, the album received an average score of 81 based on fourteen reviews. The aggregator AnyDecentMusic? has the critical consensus of the album at a 7.7 out of 10, based on fifteen reviews.

== Track listing ==
All tracks are written by Jason Williamson and Andrew Fearn.

UK Grim track listing
No.	Title	Length
1.	"UK Grim"	3:18
2.	"Dlwhy"	3:29
3.	"Force 10 from Navarone" (featuring Florence Shaw)	3:24
4.	"Tilldipper"	2:21
5.	"On the Ground"	3:32
6.	"Right Wing Beast"	3:05
7.	"Smash Each Other Up"	2:39
8.	"Don"	4:07
9.	"So Trendy" (featuring Perry Farrell and Dave Navarro)	3:45
10.	"I Claudius"	3:05
11.	"Pit 2 Pit"	3:23
12.	"Apart from You"	3:56
13.	"Tory Kong"	2:58
14.	"Rhythms of Class"	5:12
Total length:		48:21

== Personnel ==
Sleaford Mods

- Jason Williamson
- Andrew Fearn

Additional personnel

- Phil Booth – guitar on "UK Grim", engineer
- Florence Shaw – vocals on "Force 10 from Navarone"
- Perry Farrell – vocals on "So Trendy"
- Dave Navarro – guitar on "So Trendy"
- Matt Colton – mastering
- Philip Laslett – design
- Ewen Spencer – photography

== Charts ==
Chart performance for UK Grim
Chart (2023)	Peak position
Belgian Albums (Ultratop Flanders)	64
Belgian Albums (Ultratop Wallonia)	150
German Albums (Offizielle Top 100)	15
Scottish Albums (Official Charts)	2
Swiss Albums (Schweizer Hitparade)	47
UK Albums (Official Charts)	3
