= Cacti (album) =

Album by English musician and songwriter Billy Nomates

Studio album by Billy Nomates
- Released: 13 January 2023
- Studio: Invada Studios (Bristol)
- Genre: Electronic; rock
- Length: 40:48
- Label: Invada
- Producer: Tor Maries; James Trevascus

Billy Nomates chronology
Billy Nomates (2020)	Cacti (2023)	Metalhorse (2025)

Cacti is the second studio album by English musician and songwriter Billy Nomates. It was released on 13 January 2023 through Invada Records.

All songs and words are written and performed by Nomates, with additional contributions on selected tracks by Billy Fuller on bass and Geoff Barrow on cymbals. The album was recorded both at Invada Studios in Bristol, as well as in her flat.

Cacti continues to focus on themes of politics and relationships, as with her previous self-titled album, however was also heavily influenced by the effects of the COVID-19 pandemic.

== Critical reception ==
Professional ratings
Aggregate scores
Source	Rating
Metacritic	84/100
Review scores
Source	Rating
Mojo	4/5 stars
DIY	3.5/5 stars
The Skinny	3/5 stars
The Observer	4/5 stars
Clash	4/5 stars

According to the review aggregator Metacritic, Cacti received "universal acclaim" based on a weighted average score of 84 out of 100 from 12 critic scores.

Much of the reception focused positively on the development of Nomates' music since her first release, with the NME stating how she has "taken her signature sound down a completely different avenue" and Clash describing how with a "newfound emotional depth comes a far greater musical variety".

However, The Skinny noted that on this "more subdued" album it "feels like the energy that makes her such a captivating performer is being restricted by her drum machine".

== Track listing ==
All tracks are written by Tor Maries.

Cacti track listing
No.	Title	Length
1.	"Balance Is Gone"	3:33
2.	"Black Curtains in the Bag"	3:27
3.	"Blue Bones (Deathwish)"	3:18
4.	"Cacti"	4:00
5.	"Saboteur Forcefield"	3:51
6.	"Roundabout Sadness"	2:00
7.	"Spite"	3:44
8.	"Fawner"	4:07
9.	"Same Gun"	2:32
10.	"Vertigo"	2:45
11.	"Apathy Is Wild"	3:06
12.	"Blackout Signal"	4:17
Total length:		40:48

== Personnel ==
- Tor Maries – vocals, instruments, programming, production, sleeve design
- James Trevascus – production, recording, mixing
- Shawn Joseph – mastering
- Rhys Crouch – vinyl cut
- Iggy Pop – spoken word (tracks 1, 11)
- Billy Fuller – bass (tracks 1–3, 7, 11)
- Geoff Barrow – cymbals (track 8)
- Marc Bessant – sleeve design
- Eddie Whelan – photography
- Marco Torri – photography assistance
- Oliver Shipton – photography assistance
- Silvia Arsenie – styling
- Brigsy Smart – make-up
- Pål Berdahl – hair
