= Eton Alive =

Studio album by Sleaford Mods
- Released: 22 February 2019
- Recorded: 2018
- Studio: JT Soars, Nottingham
- Length: 38:44
- Label: Extreme Eating

Sleaford Mods chronology
Sleaford Mods (2018)	Eton Alive (2019)	All That Glue (2020)

Singles from Eton Alive
- 1. "Kebab Spider" Released: 7 January 2019; 2. "O.B.C.T." Released: 15 February 2019; 3. "Discourse" Released: 10 May 2019

Eton Alive is the tenth studio album by British post-punk duo Sleaford Mods. It was released on 22 February 2019 through Extreme Eating Records.

== Critical reception ==
Professional ratings
Aggregate scores
Source	Rating
AnyDecentMusic?	7.9/10
Metacritic	84/100
Review scores
Source	Rating
AllMusic	4/5 stars
The Guardian	4/5 stars
The Independent	4/5 stars
Mojo	4/5 stars
NME	4/5 stars
The Observer	4/5 stars
Q	4/5 stars
Record Collector	4/5 stars
The Times	3/5 stars
Uncut	8/10

At Metacritic, which assigns a weighted average score out of 100 to reviews from mainstream critics, the album received an average score of 84, based on 16 reviews, indicating "universal acclaim".

=== Accolades ===
Publication	Accolade	Rank	Ref.
Mojo	Top 75 Albums of 2019	65	
MusicOMH	Top 50 Albums of 2019	50	
Uncut	Top 75 Albums of 2019	45	

== Track listing ==
All lyrics are written by Jason Williamson; all music is composed by Andrew Fearn.

No.	Title	Length
1.	"Into the Payzone"	2:17
2.	"Kebab Spider"	3:40
3.	"Policy Cream"	3:29
4.	"O.B.C.T."	4:05
5.	"When You Come Up to Me"	3:43
6.	"Top It Up"	2:45
7.	"Flipside"	2:40
8.	"Subtraction"	3:16
9.	"Firewall"	3:22
10.	"Big Burt"	3:20
11.	"Discourse"	3:21
12.	"Negative Script"	2:46

== Personnel ==
Sleaford Mods

- Jason Williamson
- Andrew Fearn

Technical

- Matt Colton – mastering
- Roger Sargent – photography
- Adam Stacey – graphics

== Charts ==
Chart performance for Eton Alive
Chart (2019)	Peak position
Belgian Albums (Ultratop Wallonia)	191
German Albums (Offizielle Top 100)	58
Scottish Albums (Official Charts)	6
UK Albums (Official Charts)	9
UK Independent Albums (Official Charts)	1
