= Divide and Exit =

Studio album by Sleaford Mods
- Released: 19 May 2014
- Recorded: 2013–2014
- Studios: Arro Nottz; Rubber Biscuit
- Length: 40:09
- Label: Harbinger Sound

Sleaford Mods chronology
Retweeted – 2006–2012 (2014)	Divide and Exit (2014)	Tiswas EP (2014)

Divide and Exit is the seventh studio album by British post-punk duo Sleaford Mods. It was released on 19 May 2014 through Harbinger Sound.

== Reception ==
Professional ratings
Aggregate scores
Source	Rating
AnyDecentMusic?	6.7/10
Metacritic	81/100
Review scores
Source	Rating
AllMusic	5/5 stars
The Guardian	4/5 stars
The Irish Times	3/5 stars
Mojo	4/5 stars
NME	8/10
The Observer	4/5 stars
Pitchfork	7.8/10
Q	4/5 stars
Record Collector	4/5 stars
Uncut	7/10

At Metacritic, which assigns a normalized rating out of 100 to reviews from mainstream critics, Divide and Exit received an average score of 81 based on eleven reviews, indicating "universal acclaim". The album received positive reviews from Pitchfork and The Guardian, who named it one of the 10 best albums of 2014.

== Track listing ==
All tracks are written by Andrew Fearn and Jason Williamson.

No.	Title	Length
1.	"Air Conditioning"	2:26
2.	"Tied Up in Nottz"	2:40
3.	"A Little Ditty"	2:32
4.	"You're Brave"	2:45
5.	"Strike Force"	2:49
6.	"The Corgi"	2:35
7.	"From Rags to Richards"	3:26
8.	"Liveable Shit"	3:19
9.	"Under the Plastic and N.C.T."	3:17
10.	"Tiswas"	3:12
11.	"Keep Out of It"	2:59
12.	"Smithy"	2:21
13.	"Middle Men"	2:31
14.	"Tweet Tweet Tweet"	3:02

== Personnel ==
Sleaford Mods

- Jason Williamson
- Andrew Fearn

Additional musicians

- Nail Tolliday – bass (1)
- Matt Allesbrook – bass (6, 10)
- Tim Williams – bass (7)

Technical

- Simon Parfrement – photography
