= English Tapas =

Studio album by Sleaford Mods
- Released: 3 March 2017
- Studio: West Heath Garage
- Length: 37:31
- Label: Rough Trade
- Producer: Sleaford Mods

Sleaford Mods chronology
Live at SO36 (2016)	English Tapas (2017)	Sleaford Mods (2018)

Professional ratings
Aggregate scores
Source	Rating
AnyDecentMusic?	7.4/10
Metacritic	81/100
Review scores
Source	Rating
AllMusic	4/5 stars
The Guardian	4/5 stars
The Independent	4/5 stars
Mojo	4/5 stars
NME	3/5 stars
The Observer	4/5 stars
Pitchfork	7.9/10
Q	4/5 stars
Rolling Stone	4/5 stars
Uncut	8/10

English Tapas is the ninth studio album by English post-punk duo Sleaford Mods. Recorded at Steve Mackey's West Heath Garage studios in London, it was released via Rough Trade Records on 3 March 2017. It debuted at number 12 on the UK Albums Chart.

The songs on the album are mostly about contemporary life and politics in England following the 2016 EU referendum.

== Accolades ==
Publication	Accolade	Year	Rank	Ref.
Rough Trade	Albums of the Year	2017	28	

== Track listing ==
All tracks are written by Jason Williamson and Andrew Fearn.

No.	Title	Length
1.	"Army Nights"	3:02
2.	"Just Like We Do"	2:54
3.	"Moptop"	2:38
4.	"Messy Anywhere"	3:12
5.	"Time Sands"	3:10
6.	"Snout"	2:44
7.	"Drayton Manored"	3:36
8.	"Carlton Touts"	2:52
9.	"Cuddly"	3:44
10.	"Dull"	2:41
11.	"B.H.S."	3:48
12.	"I Feel So Wrong"	3:10

Bonus 7" single and Japanese CD bonus track
No.	Title	Length
13.	"Big Trouble in Little Costa"	2:44

== Personnel ==
Sleaford Mods

- Jason Williamson
- Andrew Fearn

Technical

- Matt Colton – mastering
- Simon Parfrement – photography
- Steve Lippert – illustrator, Photoshop

== Charts ==
Chart (2017)	Peak position
Belgian Albums (Ultratop Flanders)	128
French Albums (SNEP)	164
German Albums (Offizielle Top 100)	60
Irish Albums (IRMA)	91
Swiss Albums (Schweizer Hitparade)	87
UK Albums (OCC)	12
