= Billy Nomates =

English musician and songwriter

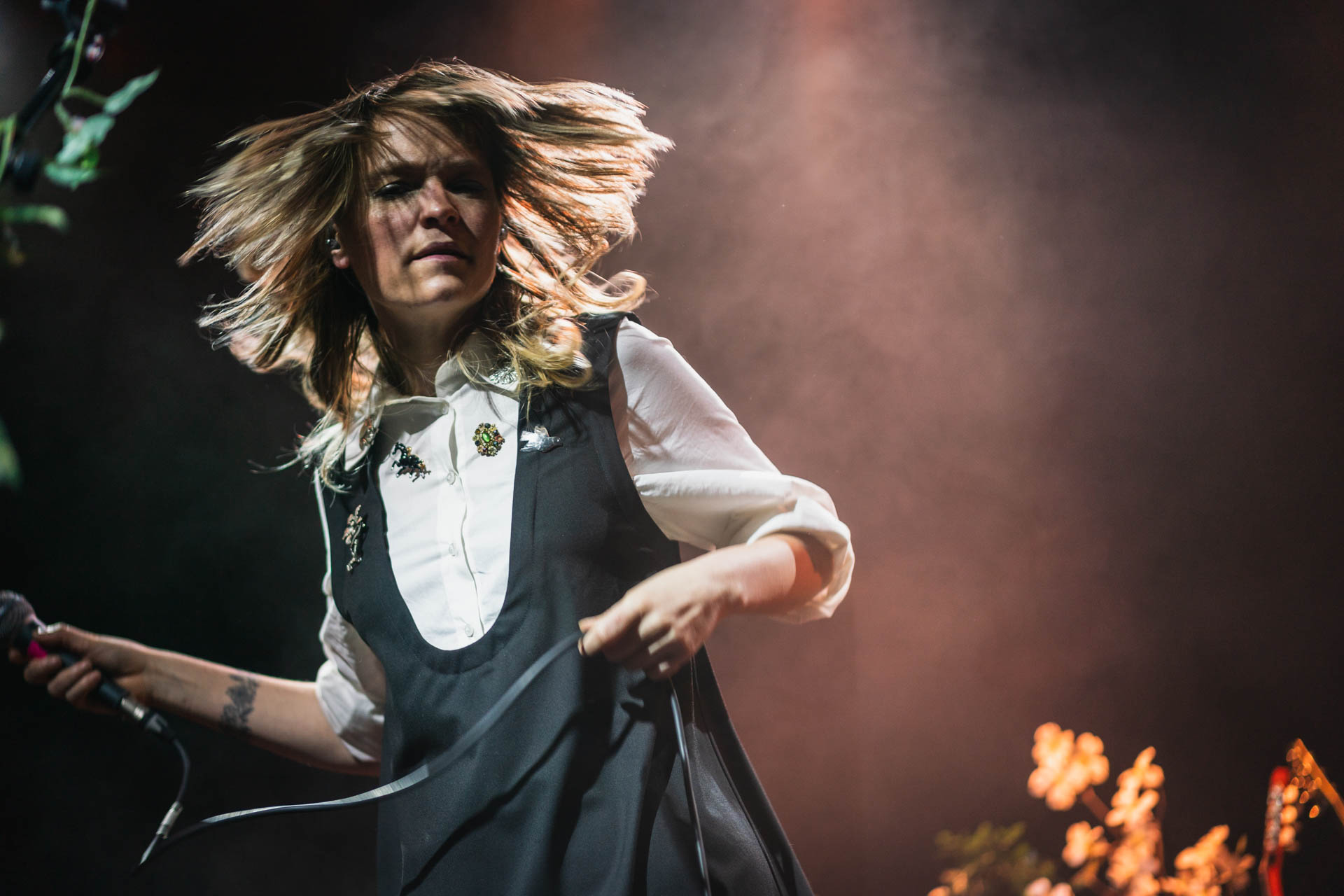
- Maries in 2024

Background information
- Also known as: Billy Nomates
- Born: Victoria Ann Maries; 2 May 1990 (age 35); Leicester, England
- Genres: Indie rock; no wave; post-punk
- Occupations: Singer-songwriter; musician
- Instruments: Vocals; guitar; synthesizers
- Years active: 2020–present
- Labels: Invada

Victoria Ann "Tor" Maries (born 2 May 1990) is an English musician and singer-songwriter who performs under the stage name Billy Nomates.

== Life ==
Maries grew up in Leicester and was a member of a number of bands that failed to be noticed. Following a period of depression, a Sleaford Mods gig inspired Maries to return to making music and she moved to Bournemouth to write and compose. Her stage name, Billy Nomates, was taken from an insult directed at her when she turned up at a gig on her own. In 2024, she was diagnosed with multiple sclerosis.

== Music ==
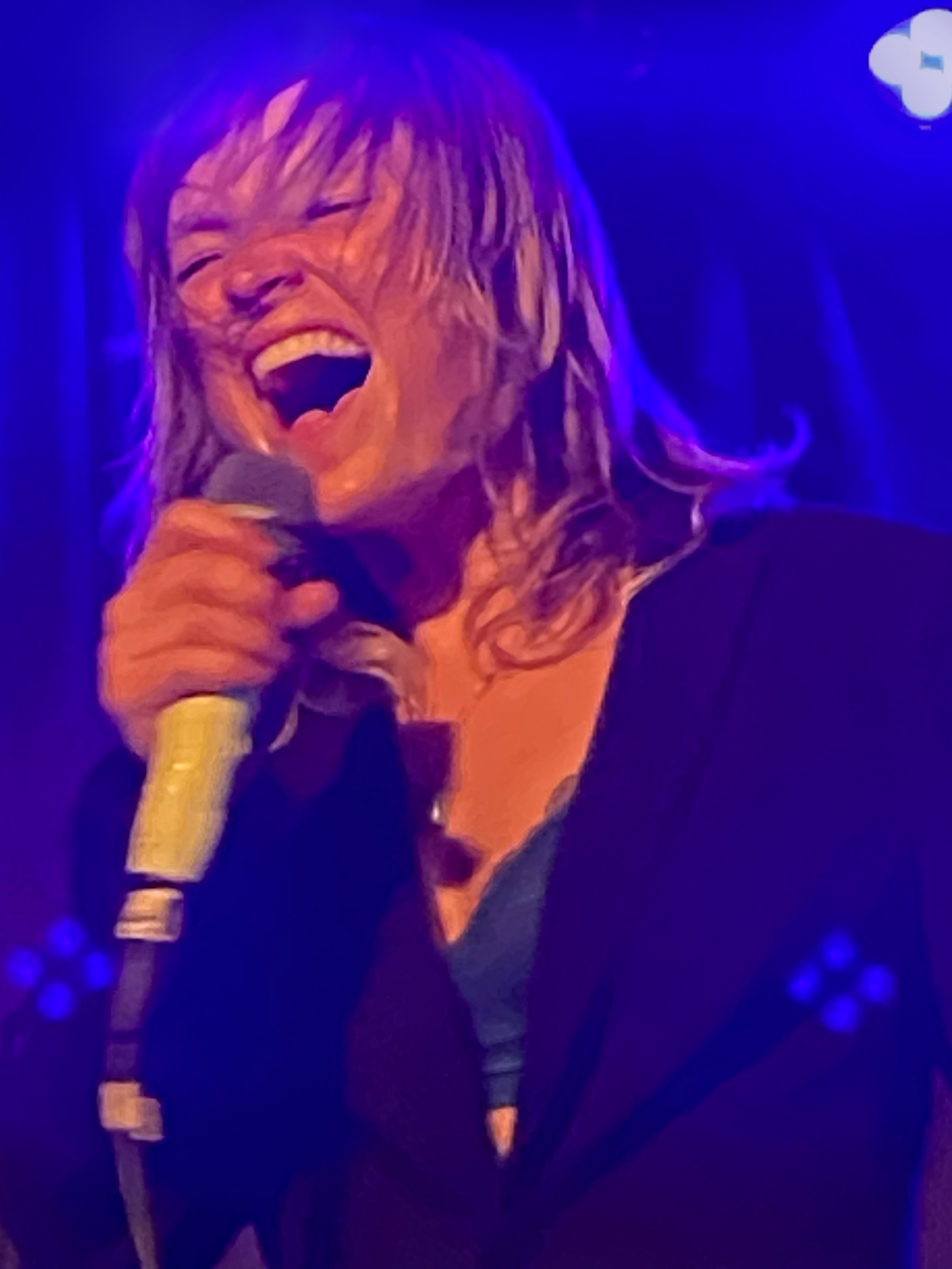
Billy Nomates at the Strom Club in Munich, 2023

Maries' first album was recorded in Bristol with Portishead's Geoff Barrow. She released this in 2020 and quickly gained attention from BBC Radio 6 Music. She describes her music as no wave. Critics make mention of post-punk and describe her delivery as sprechgesang. She featured on "Mork n Mindy" by Sleaford Mods in 2021. She released the Emergency Telephone EP in October 2021, produced by herself on Barrow's Invada record label.

Maries's second album, Cacti, was released in 2023. Later that year, after playing a set at Glastonbury that used a backing track instead of live music (something that was also a feature of her earlier live performances), Maries received what she called an "insane" amount of online abuse and requested BBC Radio 6 Music to remove footage of her performance from their web pages, a request the BBC complied with. Fellow musicians such as Billy Bragg, the Anchoress, and Lonelady expressed their support for Maries and criticised the misogynistic character of the abuse. Maries initially vowed never to perform live again after the incident, and even considered leaving music altogether, but eventually recovered on both fronts.

Maries's third album, Metalhorse, was released in 2025 and was the first Billy Nomates release where Maries worked with other musicians instead of performing all musical aspects herself, with Mandy Clarke being her bassist and Liam Chapman her drummer. A tour showcasing the album took place that autumn and began with a benefit gig for the MS Society.

== Reception ==
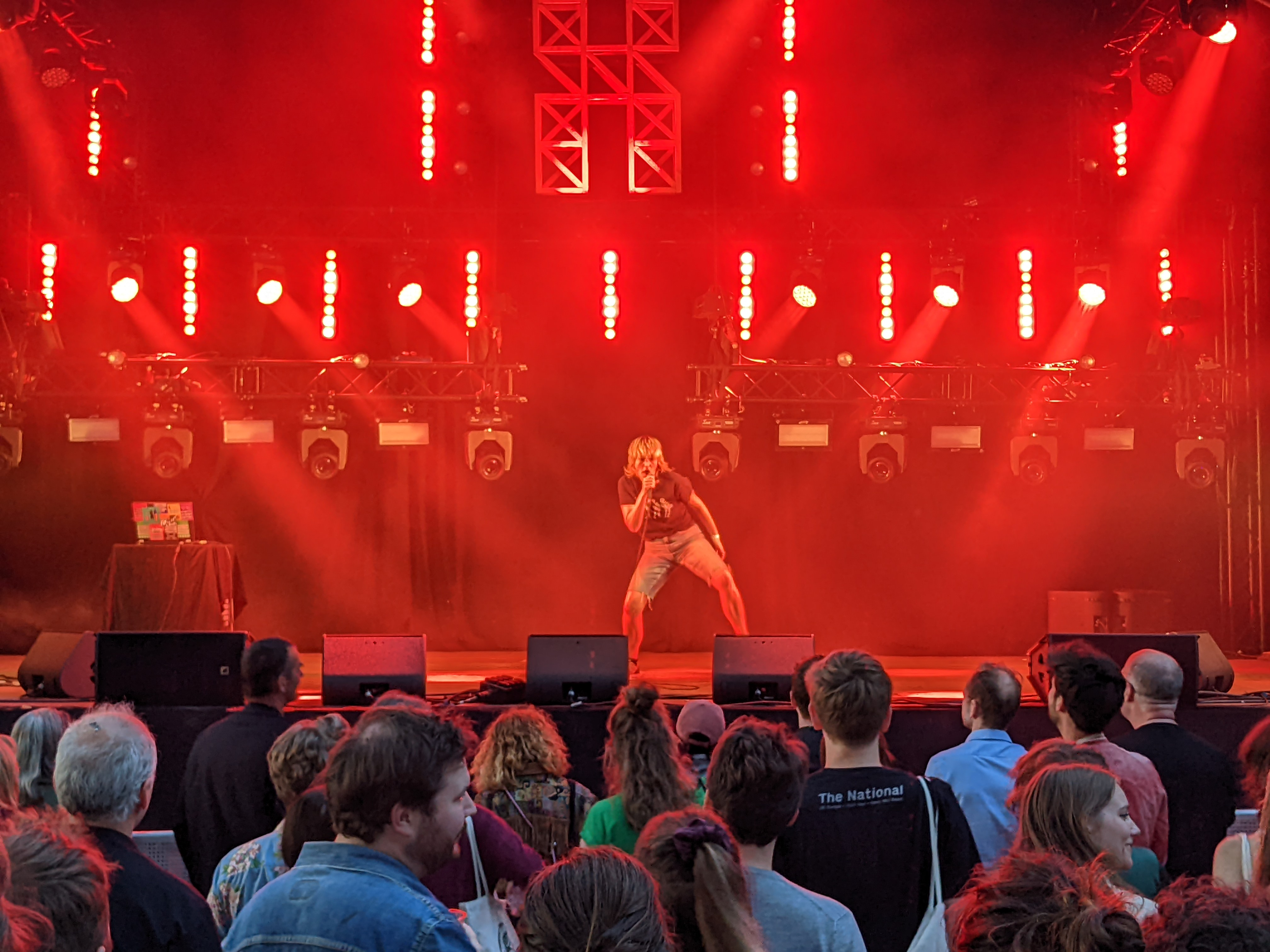
Billy Nomates at the Valkhof Festival, 2022

BBC Radio 6 Music DJ Amy Lamé chose Maries's debut as her Album of the Year in 2020. The Guardian's Laura Snapes picked out Maries as one to watch in 2020, describing her voice as "deadpan yet biting", offering "an acute lens on British class structure".

== Discography ==
=== Studio albums ===
- Billy Nomates (2020)
- Cacti (2023)
- Metalhorse (2025)

=== EPs ===
- Emergency Telephone (2021)

=== Music videos ===
Year	Title	Director	Album
2020	"No"	Jack Joseph & Bobby Spender	Billy Nomates
2020	"FNP"	n/C	Billy Nomates
2021	"Heels"	Jack Joseph Dalby & Bobby Spender	Emergency Telephone
2022	"Blue Bones"	Tia Salisbury	Cacti
2022	"Balance is Gone"	NWSPK	Cacti
2022	"Saboteur Forcefield"	John Minton	Cacti
2022	"Spite"	NWSPK	Cacti
