= Key Markets =

Studio album by Sleaford Mods
- Released: 24 July 2015
- Recorded: July 2014–March 2015
- Studio: Andrew's Old Flat; Rubber Biscuit (Nottingham)
- Length: 39:21
- Label: Harbinger Sound

Sleaford Mods chronology
Tiswas EP (2014)	Key Markets (2015)	T.C.R. (2016)

Key Markets is the eighth studio album by British post-punk duo Sleaford Mods. It was released on 24 July 2015, through Harbinger Sound. The tracks are critical of the UK government.

== Reception ==
Professional ratings
Aggregate scores
Source	Rating
AnyDecentMusic?	7.4/10
Metacritic	81/100
Review scores
Source	Rating
AllMusic	4/5 stars
The Daily Telegraph	4/5 stars
The Guardian	4/5 stars
The Independent	4/5 stars
NME	8/10
The Observer	4/5 stars
Pitchfork	7.5/10
Q	4/5 stars
Record Collector	4/5 stars
Uncut	8/10

At Metacritic, which assigns a normalized rating out of 100 to reviews from mainstream critics, Key Markets received an average score of 81 based on twenty reviews, indicating "universal acclaim". It was one of the 19 records nominated for the IMPALA Album of the Year Award 2015.

=== Accolades ===
Publication	Accolade	Year	Rank
The Guardian	The Best Albums of 2015	2015	29
NME	NME'S Albums of the Year 2015	2015	43
Rough Trade	Albums of the Year 2015	2015	29

== Track listing ==
All tracks are written by Andrew Fearn and Jason Williamson.

1. "Live Tonight" - 3:12
2. "No One's Bothered" - 2:52
3. "Bronx in a Six" - 3:35
4. "Silly Me" - 3:15
5. "Cunt Make It Up" - 2:31
6. "Face To Faces" - 3:23
7. "Arabia" - 3:01
8. "In Quiet Streets" - 4:16
9. "Tarantula Deadly Cargo" - 3:21
10. "Rupert Trousers" - 3:13
11. "Giddy on the Ciggies" - 4:15
12. "The Blob" - 2:33

== Personnel ==
Sleaford Mods

- Jason Williamson
- Andrew Fearn

Additional musicians

- Nail Tolliday – bass, drum loops (2)
- Matt Allesbrook – bass (7, 9-11)

Technical

- Matt Colton – mastering
- Simon Parfrement – cover photography
- Zoë Valls – inner sleeve photography
- Duncan Stafford – inner sleeve photography
- Alex Solman – label artwork
- Steve Lippert – album design

== Charts ==
Chart (2015)	Peak position
Belgian Albums (Ultratop Flanders)	90
German Albums (Offizielle Top 100)	74
Scottish Albums (OCC)	11
UK Albums (OCC)	11
UK Independent Albums (OCC)	3
