= Total Control Racing =

1970s toy brand

Total Control Racing (TCR) was a toy brand from Ideal which debuted in the late 1970s, similar to slot car sets, with approximately HO scale cars (and smaller scale semi-trailer trucks) that operated on a slotless track.

== Description ==
The plastic track contained lanes of three metal strips about 2 mm (0.08 inch) wide, which made contact with a configuration of two brass pads on the underside of the cars, providing power. The brass pads could be arranged in one of two possible configurations by the user. Whichever configuration a car was set to would determine which two of the three power providing metal strips were being drawn from and, hence, which of the two controllers was for which car. The plastic track had two such lanes, and cars could change lanes with the flick of a switch on the controller. TCR sets came with "jam cars", a slow moving drone which both racers had to avoid crashing into. Like Matchbox's Powertrack, some cars featured lights.

The first sets consisted of up to 4 Formula 5000 cars. The track (which stayed the same throughout successive generations of cars) was wide enough for two cars side by side and had raised edges along both sides to prevent the cars from leaving the track. No more than one or two cars could be controlled and raced. They were controlled by the user by means of a trigger controller which also carried a toggle switch. When switched up, the car would travel in the outermost lane of the track, when switched down, the car would travel in the innermost lane of the track. By this means, the user could genuinely overtake their opponent by switching lanes at the correct moment. The two remaining cars were 'Jam Cars' which would run around the track when either or both of the trigger controllers were depressed. The Jam Cars were slower than the racing cars and had front wheels that were fixed to steer permanently left or right. This meant that a Jam Car was relatively easy to pass, or manoeuvred automatically out of the way as you approached (as a lapped vehicle would in a race).

The first generation of cars worked on the principle that, when the lane changing switch was flicked, the motor of the car would reverse direction, sending the power to only one of the rear wheels. The resultant bias of having one driven wheel forced the car to run (up against the raised edge) in one or other of the lanes. Later, more complex generations of TCR cars steered by means of the reversal of the motor triggering the steering mechanism of the front wheels to be fixed left or right. These later cars have driven power to both rear wheels and had much greater performance than the earlier generations. If scaled up to actual size, a TCR car would run along a straight at perhaps 350 mph and corner at not much less.

The original sets consisted of only two different types of track part. A 15" straight and a 90 degree bend. Later sets added 45 degree bends and 10" straights. More elaborate sets included a 4 lanes wide straight that allowed you to drive off onto a second track or a pitlane, a banked corner where the centrifugal force generated by a fast moving car would allow it to run off from the electronic power strips onto a banked extension to the outside of the corner and, from a Dukes Of Hazzard TCR set, a ramp and jump.

Subsequent editions of TCR vehicles included articulated lorries, ambulances, dune buggies, trucks, go-karts and numerous replicas of road cars and many famous cars from film, television and motor racing. As can be seen below, many car companies and famous brands allowed TCR licence. Each of these different editions of vehicle sat atop an identical chassis and drive train.

In use, as a toy, TCR was compromised by three factors.

1. The speed of the cars, when they were working well, was so high that the possibility of overtaking another car was very low. The cars were all thrown to the outermost lane in every corner. Because of this, the outermost lane in an oval track would always be the fastest lane to run in. This meant that the cars being raced were using the same lane of the track, often nose-to-tail. The act of changing lanes along a straight to pass your opponent would cause a relative drop in performance as the cars left one set of electric strips in the track and steered across to the other. This effect meant that all but the slowest of opponents could not be passed, even along a significant straight. (The later addition of 45 degree bends made it possible to create overtaking spots by placing all the cars in the innermost lane at the start of a straight. Since the cars would then naturally steers themselves immediately into the outermost lane, an overtaking manoeuvre could be effected by flicking the lane changer switch to make the car stay in the innermost lane down the straight before then being thrown by centrifugal force to the outside of the next corner in front of your opponent. The manoeuvre would then be finished by switching the lane change controller to return to driving in the favoured lane from then on). The later power booster made overtaking much easier.
2. Due to the raised edge along the outside of every piece of track, a car would almost never leave the track from going too fast. Whilst this did prevent TCR from having the stop/start, run-to-fetch-a-spun-vehicle nature of Scalextric (particularly in young hands), it did mean that a TCR race required no particular skill and the user of the faster car would always win. (Speed equalisers and power boosters were later made available to attempt to level the playing field).
3. The cars themselves (particularly the later generations) were relatively delicate and only worked properly within a narrow margin of track cleanliness and overall car wear. The brass pads or shoes on the underside of the cars were easily knocked off and quick to wear away. An entire chassis of a TCR car would sag after many hours of use, causing it to drag along the track and lose performance. Dust and lint would gather inside the chassis around the moving parts, causing a great drop in performance. Tyres, shoes and motors all had a short life and required frequent servicing and replacing. This might not be unexpected in a toy that is running at a high speed, with constant friction and subjection to the battering of track sides for several hours. Numerous spares were available, but expensive. Whilst the cars themselves rarely lasted (certainly not in the hands of a child), the track pieces remain indestructible to this day.

== Withdrawal ==
The product was withdrawn from the market in the mid 1980s (after a brief attempt to reinvent TCR as a slot racing system, which was incompatible with all earlier cars and track).

TCR may have failed next to its most obvious competitor Scalextric for these and other reasons. TCR cars were matchbox sized and much smaller than Scalextric cars. This did mean that (relatively) more track could be laid out in one room.

TCR was also doomed by the new regulations for child safety. The system required at least 2 amps to correctly drive all the cars and jam cars used. The original set released in the early 1970s gave the customer a 1/2 amp transformer which was reported to give children electric shocks when they went to fix a stalled or 'de-railed' car. As a response Ideal changed the transformer in the mid 1970s to a 1/4 amp transformer; this was barely enough to run one car, when players used 2 cars plus the jam cars it was very hard to maintain the rhythm needed to keep the cars rolling properly with such low amperes. Sales for the product dropped off dramatically because of the change. Tyco had the same problem with the first Command control sets (1978). In the 1990s Tyco revamped the system. They bought the rights to 'TCR' from Ideal and were able to lower the voltage to increase the amperes and skirt the child safety laws. This gave the customer a 1/2 amp back, for 3 years Tyco tried to make a go of the command control revamp called 'TCR' but it never caught on, stalls and derails were always a problem. It is not until you run these systems on custom power supplies that give the racing set the full 2-2.5 amps of power it needs that it really shines.

In the UK the amps problem seems to be slightly different, for example, the Zig-Zag Jam Raceway set had a 3/4 amp power pack. There are higher amp sets that contain mark 3 cars such as the later Crossfire, these sets have an 'uprated' power pack which is 20 Volt 20 VA which equals 1 amp.

TCR sets are now relatively collectable items on internet auction sites. Many spares in original packaging, as well as entire sets, individual cars and smaller selections of track are sold to collectors.

== Sets ==
ENGLISH/EU SETS:

Classic sets -

- Ultimate Road Racing System (Early * Indy Jam Circuit)
- Indy Jam Circuit (Circuit No 1 Champion in France)
- Super 4 Twin Circuit (4 Car System) (Includes 2 Crossover Tracks)
- Lighted Jam Car Speedway
- Crossfire (Includes 2 Crossover Tracks)
- Trailer Cutoff Jam Car Race Set
- Super Jam car Speedway
- Zig Zag Jam Raceway (Featuring 3 cars) (Circuit TCR Zig Zag in France)
- Truck Racing (With Lap Counter & Card Diorama)
- Lighted Juggernaut Raceway (2 truck system; Red Cab & Gold Tanker Trailer & White Cab & Silver Container Trailer)

Later sets:

- Electronic super booster speedway (Contains Super Booster Power Balancing Unit)
- Police Pursuit Lighted Tilt Jump Race Set (Circuit TCR - "Tremplin" in France)
- High Banked Speedway (?)
- Dukes of Hazzard Tilt Jump
- Stop & Go (Stop & Go Barrier Accessory) (Black Trans Am V's Black Door Police Nova)(The "Smokey & The Bandit" Set)

Lighted Blazers:

- Lighted Blazers
- Lighted Blazers Glo-Charger Special (Glo Cars & UV Light Charger)
- Lighted Blazers Jam Car Special (Glo Cars)
- Lighted Blazers Zig Zag Jam Speedway (Glo Cars)

"Lane Changers" sets:

- Lane Changers Broken Bridge Chase
- Lane Changers Collision Course [1990's]
- Lane Changers Roller Coaster (Includes 2 Roller Coaster/Sand Dune Track pieces)
- Lane Changers 3 level raceway)

GERMAN SETS:

- Peugeot 205 Turbo 16 Set
- Jumped Trailer Set
- Convoi
- Freispur-Autorennbahn 500

FRENCH SETS:

- Circuit TCR Zig Zag
- Formula 5000
- Rallye 1 (French)
- Changement De File Alain Prost
- Changement De File Championnat F1 Jacques Villeneuve
- Changement De File Peugeot 905 (High Banked)(905 Vs 905)
- Changement De File Peugeot 905 (High Banked)(905 Vs Red Porsche)(French)
- Changement De File Rallye Raid (Jump Track with Cardboard Diorama)(Citroen ZX Vs Peugeot 405 T 16)
- Champion Challenge (Lane Changing)

French "Action" Sets:

- Face A Face
- Precipice (Duel Level Jump Set)(White Lamborghini Countache Vs red #44 Porsche)
- Duel (Red Oil Tanker Truck Versus Black Lamborghini Countach - Includes a Tunnel Jump)
- Police Poursuite (Black Door Police Nova Vs Red & White Camaro #88)
- Circuit TCR - "Tremplin"

ITALIAN SETS:

- Polistil Sorpasser

BRAZILIAN SETS:

- Monza Grand Prix Set
- Brasil Rallye Set
- Monte Carlo Rallye Set
- San Remo Rallye Set
- Porto Alegre - São Paulo Highway Set
- São Paulo - Rio de Janeiro Highway Set
- Rio de Janeiro - Salvador Highway Set
- Kart Set

US SETS:

- Jam Van National
- Off Road Jam Challenger
- Pro Am Jam Racing Set
- Racing Rigs Jam Roadway (Raceway? Speedway?)

== Cars non-themed ==
Make/Model	Chassis	Paintjob	Number on car	Featured in Sets	Liverys	Jam Car	Lights	Part Number	Image
Articulated Lorry		White Cab with Red stripes along bonnet to rear, Silver Trailer					Yes		N/A
BMW	Mk 3	White with red sill and blue band down wings Advert on Bonnet	28				Yes		N/A
BMW	MK2, MK3	Mostly red with white doors and rear wheel arches.	90				Yes		N/A
Chevrolet Chevelle	Mk2	Silver and black					Yes		N/A
Corvette	MK2	Silver with black chequer on bonnet with "Green Bios" on side			None		No		N/A
Datsun 280 ZX	Mk2	Blue with red and white stripes on wings	33		Pioneer		Yes		N/A
Dodge Magnum Glow Car	Mk1	Yellow with faint blue line around wings	33		None		Yes		N/A
Dodge Magnum	Mk2	Red Roof white midsection and yellow sills	23		HEMI		Yes		N/A
Dodge Magnum (never released in UK)	Mk1	Blue Wings red bonnet	34		None		Yes		N/A
Dune Buggy	Mk3	Yellow with red spoiler and bonnet			None		No		N/A
Ferrari Testarossa		Red	3		None				N/A
Indy Jam	Mk2	Black with white centre stripe down middle	19	Indy Jam Circuit	None		No		N/A
Indy Jam	Mk2	Red and white stripes on wings	1	Indy Jam Circuit	None		No		N/A
Indy Jam	Mk2	White with yellow stripe to right of driver	8	Indy Jam Circuit	None		No		N/A
Indy Jam		Black	8	Indy Jam Circuit	Union		No		N/A
Indianapolis 5000		Blue with red and white stripes on wings	8		None		No		N/A
Jeep		Orange with Black roof			None				N/A
Lancia Stratos		White	3		None		Yes		N/A
McLaren F1	MK3	Red & White			None		No		N/A
Berlingo		Red & Blue with yellow spoiler	9		None				N/A
Mustang (Rat Trap)	Mk1	Blue with yellow stripes	55			Yes		5A-1885	N/A
Pantera	MK1, MK2	White with blue and red lines on bonnet and roof	25	Lighted Jam Speedway	None	Yes	Yes	3497-5	N/A
Pinto (Rat Trap)	MK1	Red White and Blue	77				Yes		N/A
Chevrolet Camaro Z-28	MK3	Red white stripe through centre of car	88		None		Yes		N/A
Porsche	MK3	Yellow with blue and white stripes down wings	36		Michelin Advert on Spoiler				N/A
Porsche	MK2	Black with red and yellow stripe through roof	88				Yes		N/A
Peugeot 205		Blue with red and white stripes on wings	2 or 4	Peugeot Turbo 16	None				N/A
Pickup		Yellow with black bonnet and chequered roof			None	YES			N/A
Police Car	MK3	White with black doors red lights on roof			None				N/A
Pontiac Trans Am Firebird	MK2, MK3	Yellow with red bird on Bonnet					No		N/A
Racing Rig	MK1	Red							N/A
Porsche Glow in the Dark	MK2	Yellow with red Stripes on bonnet	77				Yes		N/A
Truck / Tanker		Blue with red and white stripes on wings			None				N/A
Triumph TR7		Yellow with blue and white stripes down wings	7						N/A
Triumph TR7	Mk1	White with blue stripes down wings and blue roof	7 (Yellow)						N/A
Triumph TR7		Silver	7						N/A
Chevrolet Super Nova		Orange with blue bonnet	231		None	Yes	Yes		N/A
Lancia Stratos	MK1, MK2	Yellow	3	Lighted Jam Speedway	None		Yes		N/A
Pantera	MK1, MK2	White blue bonnet yellow and red wings	11	Lighted Jam Speedway	None	Yes	Yes		N/A
Van		Black with red and white stripes alongside picture on the rear panel.							N/A

== Cars TV/film themed ==
Car	Chassis	Film/TV Show	No on Car	Featured in Sets	Liverys	Jam Car ?	Lights	Image
Boss Hogg Car		White Car with Black Bonnet and Sheriff's badge on the door Police lights on roof.	The Dukes of Hazzard					N/A
Boss Hogg Car		White Car with Sheriff's badge on the door Police lights on roof.	The Dukes of Hazzard				Yes	N/A
General Lee		Orange with the Confederate flag on roof and 01 on doors.	The Dukes of Hazzard				Yes	N/A
Pontiac Trans AM	Mk2	Black with Knight 2000 in red on doors	Knight Rider	Red center light	None		Yes	N/A

== Accessories ==
- Lap Counter
- Speed Equalizer: allowed the customer to balance speed performance between cars by setting a slider. Was a good way to evenly match cars of different generations, and detune a car that was too fast compared to the other car.
- High bank turn: attachment that would fit on the curved sections of the track and allow the cars to use centrifugal force to slide up a banked wall and look just like a NASCAR high banked turn. Allowed the cars to pass over and under each other.
- Electronic Super Booster: This accessory allows the cars on the track to have equal performance. Another function is to allow cars an extra power increase which would then allow overtaking for a few seconds once per lap. This accessory replaced the original terminal and was not released in the UK.

This accessory combined the Speed Equalizer with a single channel voltage doubler. A 555 Timing chip circuit drove a voltage doubler that would give each car a speed boost, but only in one lane change direction. from the inside lane to the outside lane. This actually made racing more unfair, because each car started in either the inside or outside lane parallel to each other. On the first trigger pull off the line, the outside lane car would automatically receive a speed boost, while the inside car would not. Only when the inner lane car changed lanes to the outside lane would it receive its voltage boost. Any car changing lanes from the outside lane to the inside lane would not receive boost. I think Ideal originally designed the super booster to provide boost for any lane change left or right, but cut the design in half to save on manufacturing and dropped the 2 extra circuits needed to produce a full boost effect. Since it was thought that the inner lane was always at a disadvantage to the outside line having the boost only help the car increase speed from the inside to outside lane change was supposed to make things fair. In reality it did not and required the player to bias the speed Equalizer bar more to limit a cheater using the outside wall centrifugal force to maintain top speed and not fly off the track.

== Track specifications ==
Length	Type	Packaging	Part Number
10 Inch	Straight	Blue Box	3307-6
15 Inch	Straight	Red or Blue Box	
12 Inch	Curve	Red Box	3348-0
	Crossroad Jump over	Comes with Rallye 1 Set	

== Trackside advertising ==
- Shell
- Dunlop
- Texaco
- GTX
- Martini
