= Spare Ribs =

Studio album by Sleaford Mods
- Released: 15 January 2021
- Studio: JT Soar, Nottingham
- Genre: Post-punk; rap rock
- Length: 42:42
- Label: Rough Trade
- Producer: Andrew Fearn

Sleaford Mods chronology
All That Glue (2020)	Spare Ribs (2021)	UK Grim (2023)

Spare Ribs is the eleventh studio album by English post-punk band Sleaford Mods. It was released on 15 January 2021 on the Rough Trade Records. Production was handled by Andrew Fearn. It features guest appearances from Amy Taylor (Amyl and the Sniffers) and Billy Nomates. It was later nominated for the Best Album Ivor Novello Award in May 2022.

== Critical reception ==
Professional ratings
Aggregate scores
Source	Rating
AnyDecentMusic?	8.1/10
Metacritic	83/100
Review scores
Source	Rating
AllMusic	4/5 stars
Clash	8/10
DIY	2/5 stars
Gigwise	10/10 stars
musicOMH	4.5/5 stars
NME	5/5 stars
PopMatters	10/10
Rolling Stone	3.5/5 stars
The Independent	3/5 stars
The Observer	4/5 stars
The Telegraph	4/5 stars

Spare Ribs was met with widespread acclaim from music critics. At Metacritic, which assigns a normalized rating out of 100 to reviews from mainstream publications, the album received an average score of 83 based on fifteen reviews. The aggregator AnyDecentMusic? has the critical consensus of the album at an 8.1 out of 10, based on twenty-one reviews.

Andrew Trendell of NME praised the album with a perfect 5 out of 5 stars, stating: "Here's your prescribed dose of reality with an unmistakable and intoxicating Sleaford Mods flavour. The extraordinary Spare Ribs is graffiti on a concrete wall; there's no manifesto, no easy answers and nowhere to hide". Laviea Thomas of Gigwise gave the album a perfect 10 out of 10 stars, calling it "faultless" adding "Sleaford Mods are out to save 2021 with their boisterous lyricism and hard-hitting production".

Sam Shepherd of musicOMH wrote: "Stripped back tracks, smart beats, punchy bass, and Williamson's dextrous barked delivery are all in place, and it seems that the band are in their dis/comfort zone". AllMusic's Heather Phares wrote: "even at the album's bleakest, Sleaford Mods never sound completely beaten down. Not even a global pandemic and repeated lockdowns can crush their spirit, and Spare Ribs feels like a hearty, timely, and well-deserved two fingers up to the powers that be". Susan Hansen of Clash wrote: "a raw snapshot perfectly designed to capture the ugliest sides of Britain, it's obvious that the duo is happy to knock at our doors once again. There's an ongoing need for this portrayal of relevant topics, and their sharpness and humour are as strong as ever". Kitty Empire of The Observer wrote: "Andrew Fearn's deathlessly inventive compositions stare you down, defying you to find them simplistic – the title track's turbo-charged electro, and the pointillist electronics of Top Room, are just two cases in point". Neil McCormick of The Telegraph wrote: "sweary, punky and bilious, Spare Ribs is unlikely to win over new converts but it is as good as anything in Sleaford Mods extensive oeuvre". Brenna Ehrlich of Rolling Stone wrote: "written partly during lockdown, the record features some of the least-annoying songs about the pandemic recorded since the initial outbreak in 2019. And that's heavy praise, considering some of the truly treacle-shellacked tracks that oozed into the zeitgeist last year".

In mixed reviews, Mark Beaumont of The Independent found the album "certainly reflects the personal and political overload of 2021, but half an hour in you'd be forgiven for scanning the horizon for your stop". Bella Martin of DIY wrote: "not one for anyone who's not already won over by the pair's particular charms".

== Track listing ==
All lyrics are written by Jason Williamson, except track 3 written with Amy Taylor and track 8 written with Billy Nomates; all music is composed by Williamson and Andrew Fearn.

No.	Title	Length
1.	"The New Brick"	0:43
2.	"Shortcummings"	3:34
3.	"Nudge It" (featuring Amy Taylor)	3:43
4.	"Elocution"	2:58
5.	"Out There"	3:56
6.	"Glimpses"	2:42
7.	"Top Room"	3:50
8.	"Mork n Mindy" (featuring Billy Nomates)	3:24
9.	"Spare Ribs"	3:52
10.	"All Day Ticket"	3:44
11.	"Thick Ear"	3:04
12.	"I Don't Rate You"	4:04
13.	"Fishcakes"	3:08
Total length:		42:42

== Personnel ==
Sleaford Mods

- Jason Williamson
- Andrew Fearn

Additional personnel

- Amy Taylor – vocals on "Nudge It"
- Billy Nomates – vocals on "Mork n Mindy"
- Dr. Lisa McKenzie – spoken intro on "Top Room"
- Sleaford Mods – recording
- Matt Colton – mastering
- Philip Laslett – artwork
- Simon Parfrement – photography

== Charts ==
Chart performance for Spare Ribs
Chart (2021)	Peak position
Australian Albums (ARIA)	47
Belgian Albums (Ultratop Flanders)	20
Belgian Albums (Ultratop Wallonia)	112
German Albums (Offizielle Top 100)	10
Irish Albums (OCC)	30
Scottish Albums (OCC)	3
Swiss Albums (Schweizer Hitparade)	19
UK Albums (OCC)	4
