= Sleaford Mods =

English electronic hip hop music duo

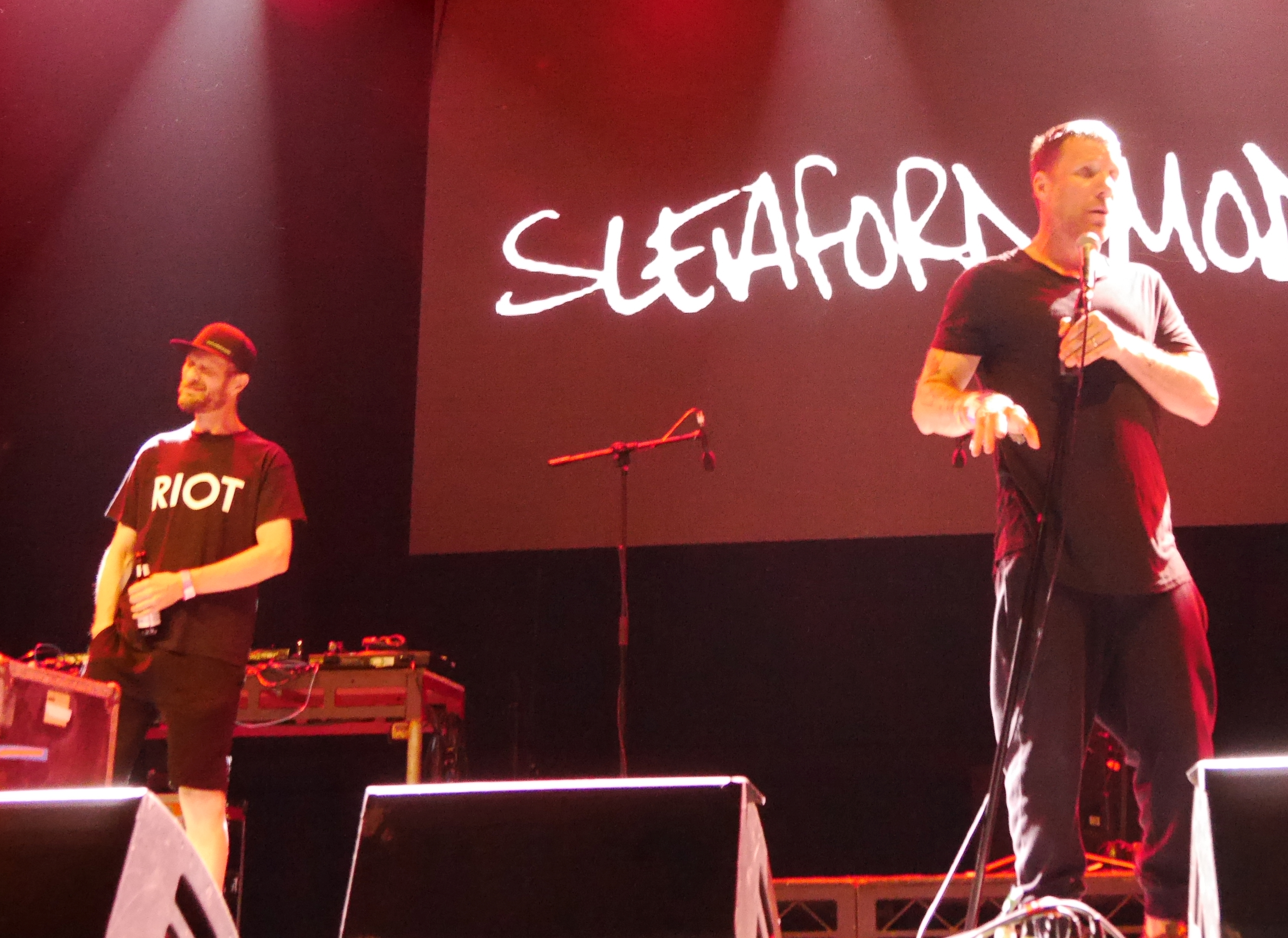
- Sleaford Mods, Glastonbury Festival, 2019

Background information
- Also known as: That's Shit, Try Harder (2007)
- Origin: Nottingham, England
- Genres: UK rap; trip hop; electro-punk; hardcore hip hop; political hip-hop
- Years active: 2007–present
- Labels: Deadly Beefburger, A52 Sounds, Harbinger Sound, Ipecac, Invada, Little Teddy Recordings, Rough Trade
- Members: Jason Williamson; Andrew Fearn
- Past members: Simon Parfrement
- Website: sleafordmods.com

Sleaford Mods are an English post-punk music duo, formed in 2007 in Nottingham. The band features vocalist Jason Williamson and, since 2012, instrumentalist Andrew Fearn. They are known for their abrasive, minimalist musical style and embittered explorations of austerity-era Britain, culture, and working class life, delivered in Williamson's East Midlands accent. The duo have released several albums to critical praise.

== History ==
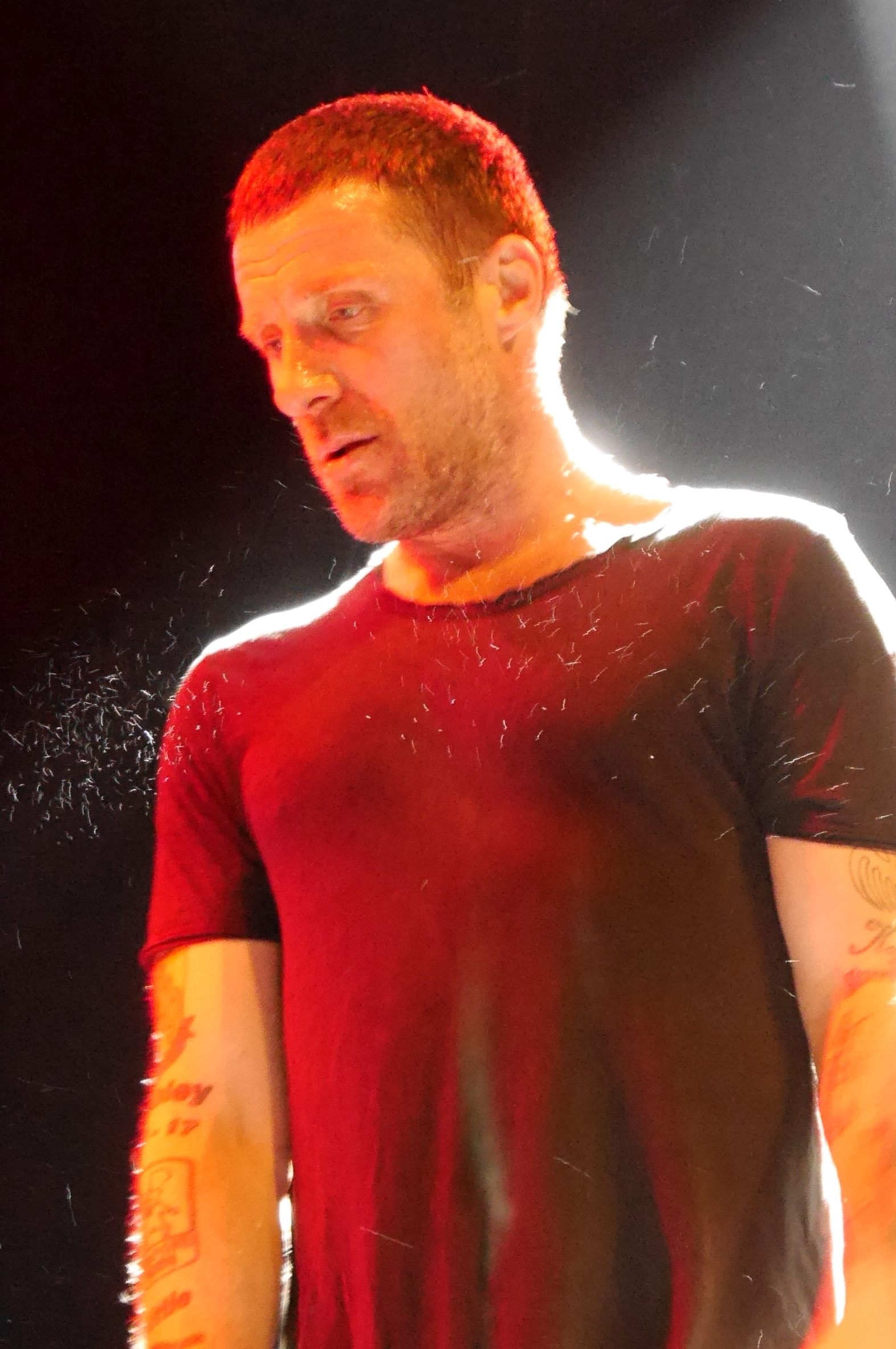
Jason Williamson, Sleaford Mods, Glastonbury Festival, 2019

Williamson was born 10 November 1970, and raised in Grantham, Lincolnshire. Inspired by the mod subculture and musical sources like the Wu-Tang Clan, he spent several years pursuing music unsuccessfully, both with various groups and as a solo singer-songwriter. He had also worked as a session musician with local artists as well as Spiritualized and Bent. Fearn (born 1971 in Burton upon Trent) grew up on a farm in Saxilby, Lincolnshire.

Williamson first met Fearn in 2009 after hearing him DJ at a small Nottingham club called the Chameleon, where he was playing his own rough-edged and minimal grime-inspired tracks. Sleaford Mods began when Simon Parfrement, a friend of Williamson's, suggested he combine his vocals with a music sample from a Roni Size album. The project was originally called "That's Shit, Try Harder", but was later changed in reference to Sleaford, a town in Lincolnshire, not far from Grantham.

Williamson formed the band with Simon Parfrement, with whom he worked alongside a studio engineer at Rubber Biscuit Studio in Nottingham on their first four albums. Parfrement left the music production to Andrew Fearn after the release of the 2012 album Wank, the first album to feature Fearn, but Parfrement continues to play an important role with the band as their photographer and media producer. On 10 December 2014, Williamson published the lyrics collection Grammar Wanker: Sleaford Mods 2007-2014, followed by Jason Williamson's House Party: Sleaford Mods 2014-2019 in 2019.

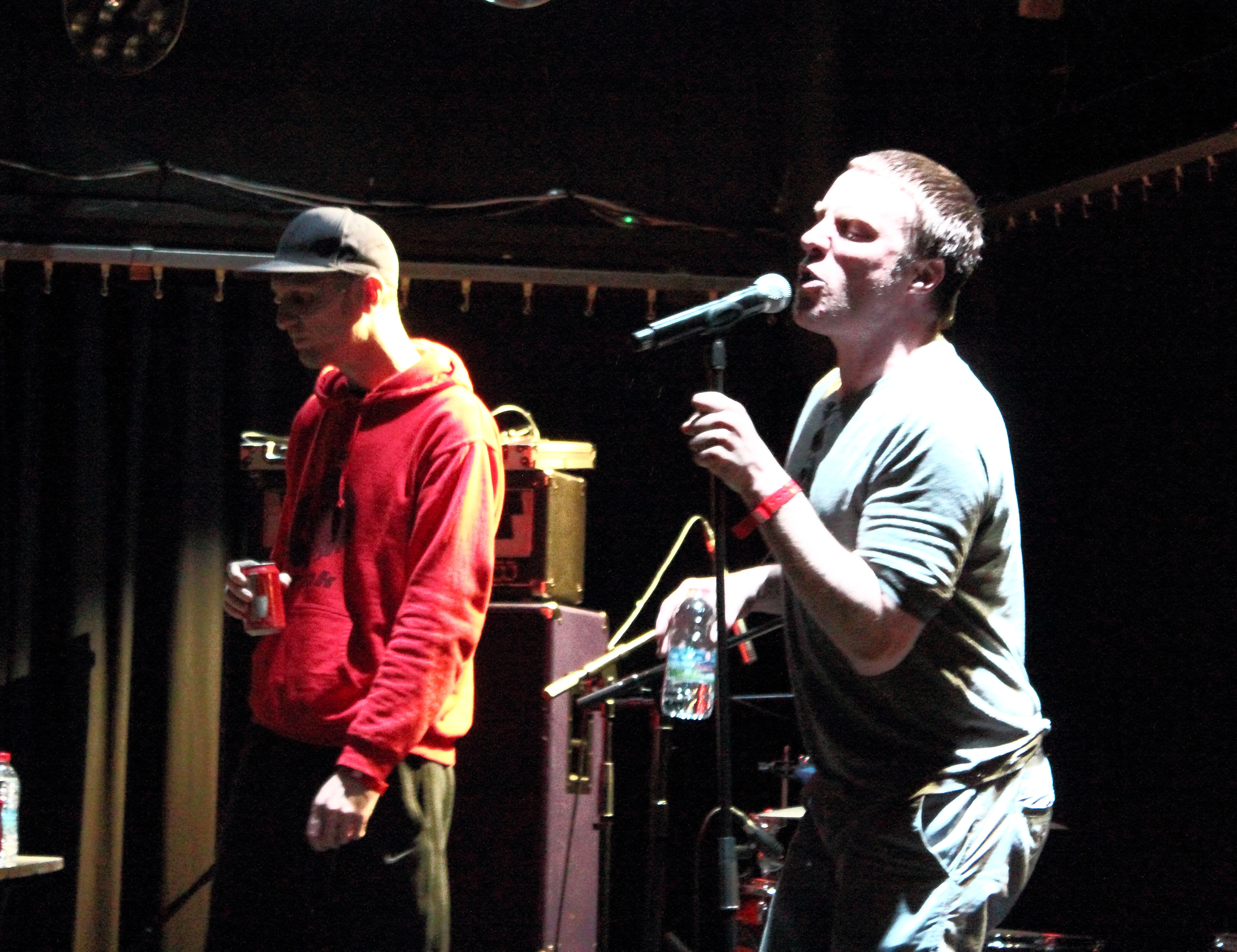
Sleaford Mods, live in 2013; Fearn (left), Williamson (right)

A collaboration between Sleaford Mods and the Prodigy was announced at the end of 2014. They recorded a track together, "Ibiza", which appears on the Prodigy album The Day Is My Enemy, released in March 2015.

The Leftfield album Alternative Light Source, released on 8 June 2015, also features a collaboration with Sleaford Mods, a track called "Head and Shoulders". The video for "Head and Shoulders" is a stop-motion/animation hybrid that debuted in August 2015. In July 2015, the band released a new album, Key Markets. It was one of the 19 records nominated for the IMPALA Album of the Year Award. The band featured in two documentary films, Sleaford Mods: Invisible Britain, released in 2015 and Bunch of Kunst. A Film About Sleaford Mods, released in 2017.

In 2016 the Sleaford Mods left Harbinger Sound and signed with Rough Trade Records. Their first release on the new label was the T.C.R. EP in 2016. In 2017, following the release of English Tapas, Sleaford Mods embarked on their first North American tour. The following year the band left Rough Trade, which eventually led to the dismissal of their long-time manager (and owner of Harbinger Records), Steve Underwood.

After releasing Eton Alive on their own label Extreme Eating Records in 2019, the band returned to Rough Trade. This renewed cooperation resulted in the release of the compilation All That Glue in 2020 and Spare Ribs in 2021 (including the single "Mork n Mindy", which was released on 30 October 2020, and reached the top of the UK vinyl singles chart). In 2019, Williamson lent his vocals to the track "Talk Whiff" by Scorn. In 2022, Williamson acted as Lazarus in the series finale of Peaky Blinders. Sleaford Mods appear alongside Orbital on the song "Dirty Rat", released on 20 October 2022.

Their twelfth album, UK Grim, was released on 10 March 2023. During a concert in Madrid on 3 November 2023, the duo abruptly ended their performance after a keffiyeh was thrown on stage. The band later posted on social media saying they believed the cloth throwing was an attempt to make them "pick sides" in the conflict in Palestine.

In October 2025 the band released "The Good Life", a single that was slated to be the first track on their next album, The Demise of Planet X. It featured additional vocals from fellow Midlands band Big Special and the actress Gwendoline Christie.

== Musical style ==
Sleaford Mods have described their work as "electronic munt minimalist punk-hop rants for the working class." Williamson is responsible for the words, Fearn for the music. Sleaford Mods songs have been described as embittered rants about such topics as unemployment, modern working life, celebrities and pop culture, capitalism and society in general. The lyrics usually contain profanity, which is, according to Williamson, the way in which he speaks and "not just fucking swearing". Fearn's music has been described as "purgatorial loop[s]" of "pugilistic post-punk-style bass; functional but unprepossessing beats; occasional cheap keyboard riffs and listless wafts of guitar."

Williamson's voice on Sleaford Mods songs is sprechgesang, rapped with his recognisable East Midlands accent. His vocal and lyrical style has variously been compared to Shaun Ryder, John Cooper Clarke, Mark E. Smith, Ian Dury, Mike Skinner and Nigel Blackwell as well as various punk and oi! artists. Williamson has cited influences including the mod subculture, the Wu-Tang Clan, Stone Roses, Nas, Red Snapper, Trim, Two Lone Swordsmen, and rave.

== Members ==
=== Current ===
- Jason Williamson – vocals, rap (2007–present)
- Andrew Fearn – computer, samples, loops, programming, production (2011–present)

=== Former ===
- Simon Parfrement (aka Simon Claridge) – computer, samples, loops, programming, production (2007–2012)

== Discography ==
=== Studio albums ===
Title	Details	Peak chart positions									
Title	Details	UK	UK Indie	AUS	BEL (FL)	BEL (WA)	FRA	GER	IRE	NZ	SWI
Sleaford Mods	Released: 2007; Labels: A52 Sounds; Format: Digital download, CD	—	—	—	—	—	—	—	—	—	—
The Mekon	Released: 2007; Labels: A52 Sounds; Format: Digital download, CD	—	—	—	—	—	—	—	—	—	—
The Originator	Released: 2009; Labels: A52 Sounds; Format: Digital download, CD	—	—	—	—	—	—	—	—	—	—
S.P.E.C.T.R.E.	Released: 2011; Labels: Deadly Beefburger; Format: Digital download, CD	—	—	—	—	—	—	—	—	—	—
Wank	Released: 2012; Labels: Deadly Beefburger; Format: Digital download, CD	—	—	—	—	—	—	—	—	—	—
Austerity Dogs	Released: 3 January 2013; Labels: Harbinger Sound; Format: Digital download, CD, LP	—	—	—	—	—	—	—	—	—	—
Divide and Exit	Released: 19 May 2014; Labels: Harbinger Sound; Format: Digital download, CD, LP	—	2	—	—	—	—	—	—	—	—
Key Markets	Released: 24 July 2015; Labels: Harbinger Sound; Format: Digital download, CD, LP	11	3	—	90	—	—	74	—	—	—
English Tapas	Released: 3 March 2017; Labels: Rough Trade; Format: Digital download, CD, LP	12	3	—	93	—	164	60	91	—	87
Eton Alive	Released: 22 February 2019; Labels: Extreme Eating; Format: Digital download, CD, LP, cassette	9	1	—	—	191	—	58	—	—	—
Spare Ribs	Released: 15 January 2021; Labels: Rough Trade; Format: Digital download, CD, LP, cassette	4	2	47	30	112	—	10	30	—	19
UK Grim	Released: 10 March 2023; Labels: Rough Trade; Format: Digital download, CD, LP, cassette	3	1	—	64	150	139	15	—	28	47
The Demise of Planet X	Released: 16 January 2026; Labels: Rough Trade; Format: Digital download, CD, LP, cassette	6	1	36	178	—	—	13	—	39	48
"—" denotes a recording that did not chart or was not released in that territory.

=== Extended plays ===
Title	Details	Peak chart positions
Title	Details	UK
Tiswas EP	Released: 24 November 2014; Labels: Invada; Format: Digital download, Vinyl	—
T.C.R.	Released: 14 October 2016; Labels: Rough Trade; Format: Digital download, Vinyl	—
Sleaford Mods	Released: 14 September 2018; Labels: Rough Trade; Format: Digital download, Vinyl	42
More UK Grim	Released: 20 October 2023; Labels: Rough Trade; Format: Streaming, 12" pink vinyl	—

=== Live albums ===
Title	Details
Live at SO36	Released: 4 November 2016; Labels: Harbinger Sound; Format: Digital download, CD, LP

=== Compilation albums ===
Title	Details	Peak chart positions
Title	Details	UK
Chubbed Up – The Singles Collection	Released: 14 February 2014; Labels: Self-release; Format: Digital download	—
Retweeted – 2006–2012	Released: 10 May 2014; Labels: Salon Alter Hammer; Format: LP	—
Chubbed Up + (With additional tracks)	Released: 24 November 2014; Labels: Ipecac Records; Format: CD, LP	—
All That Glue	Released: 15 May 2020; Labels: Rough Trade Records; Format: Digital download, LP	10

=== Singles ===
Title	Year	Peak chart positions		Album/EP	Ref.
Title	Year	UK Sales	UK Phys.	Album/EP	Ref.
"Fizzy"	2014	—	13	Divide and Exit	
"T.C.R."	2016	—	—	T.C.R.	
"Stick in a Five and Go"	2018	—	—	Sleaford Mods (EP)	
"Kebab Spider"	2019	—	—	Eton Alive	
"O.B.C.T."	2019	—	—	Eton Alive	
"Discourse"	2019	84	3	Eton Alive	
"Mork n Mindy" (feat. Billy Nomates)	2020	35	1	Spare Ribs	
"Dirty Rat" (with Orbital)	2022	—	—	Optical Delusion	
"The Violent Economy"	2023	—	—	—N/a	
"West End Girls"	2023	9	6	—N/a	
"Nom Nom Nom" / "Cat Burglar" (with Hot Chip)	2024	—	—	—N/a	
"Megaton"	2025	10	2	The Demise of Planet X	
"The Good Life" (feat. Gwendoline Christie and Big Special)	2025	—	—	The Demise of Planet X	
"Bad Santa"	2025	—	—	The Demise of Planet X	
"No Touch" (feat. Sue Tompkins)	2025	—	—	The Demise of Planet X	
"Elitest G.O.A.T." (feat. Aldous Harding)	2026			The Demise of Planet X	

=== Music videos ===
Year	Album	Title	Director	Other featured artist
2014	Divide and Exit	Tied Up in Nottz	Simon Parfrement	
2014	Divide and Exit	Tiswas	James Turner	
2015	/	Jolly Fucker	David Sillitoe Andrew Fearn	
2015	Key Markets	Tarentula Deadly Cargo	Simon Parfrement	
2015	Key Markets	No One's Bothered	Adam Bibilo	
2017	English Tapas	B.H.S.	Simon Parfrement	
2017	English Tapas	Moptop	Simon Parfrement	
2018	Sleaford Mods	Bang Someone Out	Chris Floyd (photographer)	
2019	Eton Alive	Kebab Spider	Roger Sargent (photographer)	
2019	/	Discourse	Roger Sargent (photographer)	
2020	All That Glue	Second	Robin Lee	
2020	Spare Ribs	Mork n Mindy	Ben Wheatley	Billy Nomates
2020	Spare Ribs	Shortcummings	Ian Tatham Sonder Design	
2021	Spare Ribs	Nudge It	Eddie the Wheel	Amy Taylor
2023	UK Grim	UK Grim	Cold War Steve	
2023	UK Grim	Force 10 From Navarone	Eddie Whelan	Florence Shaw
2023	UK Grim	So Trendy	John Minton	Perry Farrell
2023	More UK Grim	Big Pharma	Sean Sears AKA Prawnimation	
2023	/	West End Girls	Ewen Spencer	
