= Andrew Fearn =

English musician in Sleaford Mods

- Fearn in 2021
- Born: 1971 or 1972 (age 54–55)
- Occupation: musician
- Known for: Sleaford Mods

Andrew Fearn is an English musician. He is the musician for the post-punk duo Sleaford Mods. He runs the netlabel Extempure Records and publishes solo material on Bandcamp.

== Early life ==
Fearn grew up near Saxilby. He became a vegetarian when he was 15. He discussed growing up gay in rural England saying "It was hard, but I was lucky as well because I had friends at school who were cool about me being gay." His first musical projects were as a teenager when his music teacher got him involved in music theater productions. He took piano lessons when he was 14 through 16 and had a Yamaha keyboard at home and would experiment making recordings with it. He also learned how to play guitar. He attended Newark Tech and dropped out after six months. His first sampler was a Casio FZ-10 which he used with an Amiga1200.

== Career ==
Fearn moved to Nottingham where he made tracks on a cheap four track and signed on at the job center. He met Jason Williamson, the band's vocalist, at a bar called the Chameleon. The two made music together but kept their day jobs. Fearn's day job at the time was being a cold caller for a gym. He also released solo albums via Bandcamp under the name extnddntwrk.

Fearn joined Sleaford Mods officially in 2012. He worked on the music for the album Wank and would occasionally accompany Williamson to gigs and they began to tour as a duo. He recorded the music for their next album, Austerity Dogs, in his small flat with two very large speakers. His music has been described as "deceptively simple" and he describes his style as "having more space in the music and liking more space in the music." He was the co-producer on the band's latest album. Williamson describes him as "the sane one."

On the sporadic occasions when he tours with his solo performances as extnddntwrk, he will write a new set for every show.

== Equipment ==
Fearn uses a Bitbox 1010 sampler. He will often shift tools depending on his project. For the band's 2025 single "The Good Life" he had sounds which he'd sampled with KORG's Gadgets and then imported into Steinberg's Cubasis to add some light compression. He does not use AI in his work stating "The music that AI creates is awful." He cites the band Tortoise, LFO and DJ Krush as influences.
