= Jason Williamson =

English singer, songwriter, author and actor (born 1970)

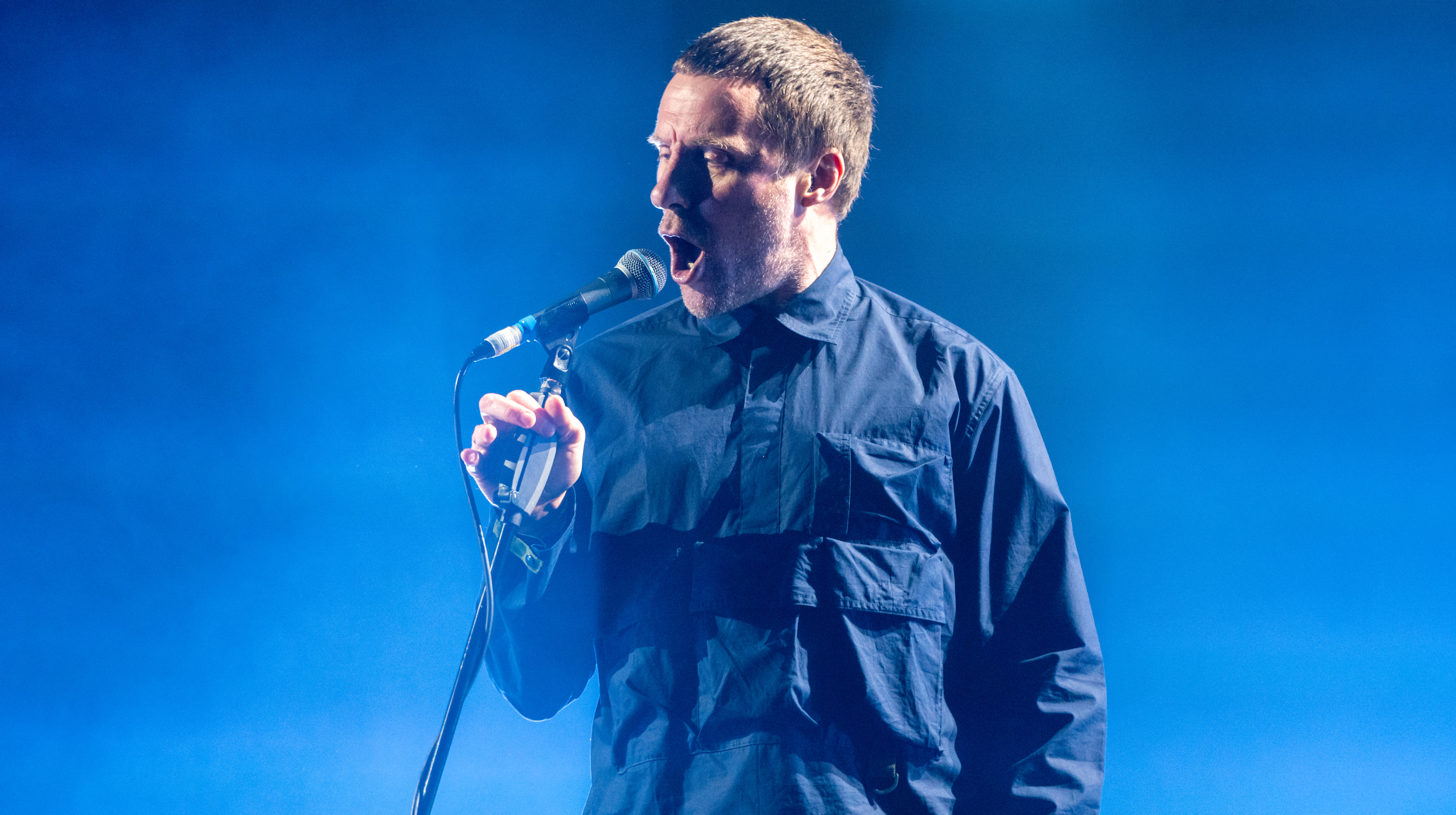
- Williamson performing with Sleaford Mods at the Crystal Palace Bowl, 2021

Background information
- Born: 10 November 1970 (age 55); Grantham, Lincolnshire, England
- Genres: Post-punk; synth-punk; punk rap; spoken word; minimalist
- Occupations: Singer; songwriter; author; actor
- Member of: Sleaford Mods

Jason Williamson (born 10 November 1970) is an English singer, songwriter, author and actor. He is the vocalist and songwriter for the post-punk duo Sleaford Mods, known for its stripped-back production and Williamson’s blunt, spoken delivery.

== Early life and education ==
Williamson was born on 10 November 1970 in Grantham, Lincolnshire, England. As a teenager he held a series of low-paid jobs, including work in a chicken-processing plant for a year. He has described that job as difficult but important to his understanding of working-class life. He was expelled from school at age 16, however returned to college after a year of working to complete his GCSEs and A-levels.

== Career ==
=== Early musical work ===
Before forming Sleaford Mods, Williamson spent many years in Nottingham playing in different bands. After moving there in 1995, he briefly worked with bands such as Spiritualized and Bent.

=== Sleaford Mods ===
In 2007, Sleaford Mods released their self-titled debut album. The duo rose to wider attention with the albums Austerity Dogs (2013) and Divide and Exit (2014). Their later releases on Rough Trade, including English Tapas (2017), helped to establish the band internationally. Their 2023 album UK Grim reached no. 3 on the UK Albums Chart.

=== Acting and writing ===
Williamson made his film debut in uk18 (2017). He later appeared in Peaky Blinders (2022). He appeared in Bird (2024). In 2025 he starred in the feature film Game, directed by John Minton and produced by Geoff Barrow.

He has published two collections of lyrics: Grammar Wanker (2014) and Jason Williamson's House Party (2019).

== Political views ==
Williamson has been openly critical of UK austerity policies and political leadership, both in interviews and in his lyrics. He supported elements of Jeremy Corbyn's Labour platform but later expressed frustration with party politics and the direction of "centrist" Labour under Keir Starmer.

== Personal life ==
Williamson has spoken openly about his recovery from alcohol and drug addiction.

== Discography ==
=== With Sleaford Mods ===
- Sleaford Mods (2007)
- The Mekon (2007)
- The Originator (2009)
- S.P.E.C.T.R.E. (2011)
- Wank (2012)
- Austerity Dogs (2013)
- Divide and Exit (2014)
- Key Markets (2015)
- English Tapas (2017)
- Eton Alive (2019)
- Spare Ribs (2021)
- UK Grim (2023)
- The Demise of Planet X (2026)

=== As featured artist ===
- The Bug – "Treetop" / "Stoat" (2021)

== Filmography ==
- uk18 (2017)
- Landscapers (2021)
- Peaky Blinders (2022)
- Bird (2024)
- Game (2025)
