= List of UK Independent Album Breakers Chart number ones of the 2020s =

This is the list of the number-one albums of the UK Indie Breakers Chart during the 2020s.

== Number-one albums ==
No.	Artist (Note: The artist, album, date of reaching number one and number of weeks at number one are those given by the Official Charts Company.)	Album	Record label (Note: The record labels are those given by the Official Charts Company.)	Reached number one	Weeks at number one
2020
re	Peppa Pig	My First Album	Eone Music	5 December 2019	6
450	Stephen Hough	Bramhs:The Final Piano Pieces	Hyperion	16 January 2020	1
451	Poppy	I Disagree	Sumerian	23 January 2020	1
452	Pinegrove	Marigold	Rough Trade	30 January 2020	1
453	Vukovi	Fall Better	Vukovi	6 February 2020	1
454	Smoke Fairies	Darkness Brings the Wonders Home	Year Seven	13 February 2020	1
455	Delain	Apocalypse & Chill	Napalm	20 February 2020	1
456	Moses Boyd	Dark Matter	Exodus	27 February 2020	1
457	Biff Byford	School of Hard Knocks	Silver Lining	5 March 2020	1
458	The Orielles	Disco Volador	Heavenly	12 March 2020	1
459	Jonathan Wilson	Dixie Blur	Bella Union	19 March 2020	1
460	Porridge Radio	Every Bad	Secretly Canadian	26 March 2020	1
461	Baxter Dury	The Night Chancers	Pias De Label	2 April 2020	1
462	Hania Rani	Esja	Gondwana	9 April 2020	1
463	The Lovely Eggs	I Am Moron	Egg	16 April 2020	1
464	The Mountain Goats	Songs for Pierre Chuvin	Merge	23 April 2020	1
465	Twinnie	Hollywood Gypsy	BMG	30 April 2020	1
466	B.C. Camplight	Shortly after Takeoff	Bella Union	7 May 2020	1
467	Ist Ist	Articulture	Kind Violence	14 May 2020	1
468	Car Seat Headrest	Making a Door Less Open	Matador	21 May 2020	1
469	The Vapors	Together	Manmade Soul	28 May 2020	1
470	Sean Shibe	Bach	Delphian	4 June 2020	1
471	Alestorm	Curse of the Crystal Coconut	Napalm	11 June 2020	1
472	Rolling Blackouts Coastal Fever	Sideways to New Italy	Sub Pop	18 June 2020	1
473	Larkin Poe	Self Made Man	Tricki-Woo	25 June 2020	1
474	The Spitfires	Life Worth Living	Acid Jazz	2 July 2020	1
475	Pottery	Welcome To Bobby's Motel	Partisan	9 July 2020	1
476	Toyah and the Humans	Noise in Your Head	Edsel	16 July 2020	1
477	The Midnight	Monsters	Counter	23 July 2020	1
478	Blinders	Fantasies of a Stay At Home Psychopath	Modern Sky	30 July 2020	1
479	Courtney Marie Andrews	Old Flowers	Loose Music	6 August 2020	1
480	Small Faces and Humble Pie	The Ultimate Collection	BMG	13 August 2020	1
481	Willie J Healey	Twin Heavy	Yala	20 August 2020	1
482	Marsicans	Ursa Major	Killing Moon	27 August 2020	1
483	The Lemon Twigs	Songs for the General Public	4AD	3 September 2020	1
484	Walter Trout	Ordinary Madness	Provogue	10 September 2020	1
485	Emily Barker	A Dark Murmuration Of Words	Everyone Sang	17 September 2020	1
486	Fay Hield	Wrackline	Topic	24 September 2020	1
487	Bright Light Bright Light	Fun City	YSKWN	1 October 2020	1
488	A Certain Ratio	Acr Loco	Mute	8 October 2020	1
489	The Jaded Hearts Club	You're Always Been There	Infectious	15 October 2020	1
490	Emmy the Great	April	Bella Union	22 October 2020	1
491	Autechre	Sign	Warp	29 October 2020	1
492	Moons	Pocket Melodies	Colorama	5 November 2020	1
493	Mr. Bungle	The Raging Wrath of the Easter Bunny Demo	Ipecac	12 November 2020	1
494	Jubillee	You And I	Repertoire	19 November 2020	1
495	Lunatic Soul	Through Shaded Woods	Kscope	26 November 2020	1
496	Killer Be Killed	Reluctant Hero	Nuclear Blast	3 December 2020	1
496	Cats in Space	Atlantis	Harmony Factory	10 December 2020	1
497	Rimzee	Upper Clapton Dream 2	Rimzee	17 December 2020	1
498	Late Night Final	A Wonderful Hope	Pias	24 December 2020	1
499	Chilly Gonzales	A Very Chilly Christmas	Gentle Threat	31 December 2020	1
2021
500	Sault	Untitled (Black Is)	Forever Living Originals	7 January 2021	1
501	Madvillainy	Madvillain	Stones Throw	14 January 2021	1
502	Viagra Boys	Welfare Jazz	YEAR0001	21 January 2021	2
503	Byson Family	Kick the Traces	Assai Recordings	4 February 2021	1
504	Martin Gore	The Third Chimpanzee	Mute	11 February 2021	1
505	The Weather Station	Ignorance	Fat Possum	18 February 2021	1
506	Jeff Tweedy	Love is the King	DBPM	25 February 2021	1
507	Ricky Warwick	When Life Was Hard and Fast	Nuclear Blast	4 March 2021	1
508	Julien Baker	Little Oblivions	Matador	11 March 2021	1
509	Dimensions	Organ	Dimension	18 March 2021	1
510	Blackmore's Night	Nature's Light	Ear Music	25 March 2021	1
511	William Doyle	Great Spans of Muddy Time	Tough Love	1 April 2021	1
512	Tomahawk	Tonic Immobility	Ipecac	8 April 2021	1
513	Chris Catalyst	Kaleidoscopes	Wrath	15 April 2021	1
514	Devil Sold His Soul	Loss	Nuclear Blast	22 April 2021	1
515	Cannibal Corpse	Violence Unimagined	Metal Blade	29 April 2021	1
516	Alfa Mist	Bring Backs	Anti	6 May 2021	1
517	Dropkick Murphys	Turn Up That Dial	Born and Bred	13 May 2021	1
518	Alfie Templeman	Forever Isn't Long Enough	Chess Club	20 May 2021	1
519	Seefeel	Rupt & Flex	Warp	27 May 2021	1
520	John Hiatt/Jerry Douglas Band	Leftover Feelings	New West	3 June 2021	1
521	Black Midi	Cavalcade	Rough Trade	10 June 2021	1
522	Japanese Breakfast	Jubilee	Dead Oceans	17 June 2021	1
523	Mammoth WVH	Mammoth WVH	EX1	24 June 2021	1
524	Tigercub	As Blue As Indigo	Blame	1 July 2021	1
525	Hiatus Kaiyote	Mood Valiant	Ninja Tune	8 July 2021	1
526	Snapped Ankles	Forest Of Your Problems	The Leaf Label	15 July 2021	1
527	The Goon Sax	Mirror II	Matador	22 July 2021	1
528	Powerwolf	Call of the Wild	Napalm	29 July 2021	1
529	Emma-Jean Thackray	Yellow	Warp	5 August 2021	1
530	Durand Jones & The Indications	Private Space	Dead Oceans	12 August 2021	1
531	Wandering Hearts	The Wandering Hearts	Cooking Vinyl	19 August 2021	1
532	Joy Orbison	Still Slipping Vol.1	XL	26 August 2021	1
533	Shaun William Ryder	Visits From Future Technology	Swrx Recordings	2 September 2021	1
534	Goat	Headsoup	Rocket	9 September 2021	1
535	Trampolene	Love No Less Than a Queen	Strap Originals	16 September 2021	1
536	Byson Family	Kick the Traces	Seshlehem	23 September 2021	1
537	Carcass	Torn Arteries	Nuclear Blast	30 September 2021	1
538	Tom Speight	Everything's Waiting for You	Nettwerk	7 October 2021	1
539	KK's Priest	Sermons of the Sinner	Ex1	14 October 2021	1
540	Johnny Flynn and Robert Macfarlane	Lost in the Cedar Wood	Transgressive	21 October 2021	1
541	Enhypen	Dimension: Dilemma	Hybe	28 October 2021	1
542	Sonony Fodea	Wide Awake	Solotoko	4 November 2021	1
543	Beast in Black	Dark Connection	Nuclear Blast	11 November 2021	1
544	Rina Sawayama	Sawayama	Dirty Hit	18 November 2021	1
545	W H Lung	Vanities	Melodic	25 November 2021	1
546	When Rivers Meet	Saving Grace	One Road	2 December 2021	1
547	Ist Ist	The Art of Lying	Kind Violence	9 December 2021	1
548	Geese	Projector	Partisan	16 December 2021	1
548	Spell Songs	Spell Songs II - Let the Light in	Quercus	23 December 2021	1
549	Afflecks Palace	What Do You Mean It's Not Raining	Spirit of Spike Island	30 December 2021	1
2022
re	Enhypen	Dimension: Dilemma	Hybe	6 January 2022	1
550	Monsta X	The Dreaming	BMG	13 January 2022	1
551	Burial	Antidawn	Hyperdub	20 January 2022	1
552	Orlando Weeks	Hop Up	Pias	27 January 2022	1
553	Battle Beast	Circus of Doom	Nuclear Blast	3 February 2022	1
554	Lady Blackbird	Black Acid Soul	BMG	10 February 2022	1
555	Cate Le Bon	Pompeii	Mexican Summer	17 February 2022	1
556	Delines	The Sea Drift	Decor	24 February 2022	1
557	Los Campesinos	Hello Sadness	Heart Smells	3 March 2022	1
558	Elles Bailey	Shining in the Half Light	Outlaw Music	10 March 2022	1
559	Nilüfer Yanya	Painless	Cooperative Music	17 March 2022	1
560	Bodega	Broken Equipment	What's Your Rupture?	24 March 2022	1
561	Peter Doherty with Frédéric Lo	The Fantasy Life of Poetry and Crime	Strap Originals	31 March 2022	1
562	Ibibio Sound Machine	Electricity	Merge	7 April 2022	1
563	Fatherson	Normal Fears	Easy Life	14 April 2022	1
564	Envy of None	Envy of None	Kscope	21 April 2022	1
565	Sault	Air	Forever Living Originals	28 April 2022	1
566	Pip Blom	Welcome Break	Heavenly	5 May 2022	1
567	Honeyglaze	Honeyglaze	Speedy Wunderground	12 May 2022	1
568	Stand Atlantic	F.E.A.R.	Hopeless	19 May 2022	1
569	Kevin Morby	This Is a Photograph	Dead Oceans	26 May 2022	1
570	Rolling Blackouts Coastal Fever	Endless Rooms	Sub Pop	2 June 2022	1
571	Just Mustard	Heart Under	Partisan	9 June 2022	1
572	Horsegirl	Versions of Modern Romance	Matador	16 June 2022	1
573	Kreator	Hate Über Alles	Nuclear Blast	23 June 2022	1
574	Viktor Vaughn	Vaudeville Villain	Get On Down	30 June 2022	1
575	Alexisonfire	Otherness	Dine Alone	7 July 2022	1
576	Warmduscher	At the Hotspot	Bella Union	14 July 2022	1
577	Katy J Pearson	Sound of the Morning	Heavenly	21 July 2022	1
578	Trashcan Sinatras	Weightlifting	Last Night From Glasgow	28 July 2022	1
579	Odesza	The Last Goodbye	Foreign Family Collective	4 August 2022	1
580	Cats in Space	Kickstart the Sun	Harmony Factory	11 August 2022	1
581	Dub War	Westgate Under Fire	Earache	18 August 2022	1
582	Osees	A Foul Form	Castle Face	25 August 2022	1
583	The Chats	Get Fucked	Bargain Bin	1 September 2022	1
584	Julia Jacklin	Pre Pleasure	Transgressive	8 September 2022	1
585	Blind Guardian	The God Machine	Nuclear Blast	15 September 2022	1
586	Oliver Sim	Hideous Bastard	Young	22 September 2022	1
587	Behemoth	Opvs Contra Natvram	Nuclear Blast	29 September 2022	1
588	Vieux Farka Touré and Khruangbin	Ali	Dead Oceans	6 October 2022	1
589	Off!	Free LSD	Fat Possum	13 October 2022	1
590	Courtney Marie Andrews	Loose Future	Fat Possum	20 October 2022	1
591	David Longdon	Door One	Big Big Train	27 October 2022	1
592	Hugh Cornwell	Moments of Madness	His	3 November 2022	1
re	Lady Blackbird	Black and Soul	BMG	10 November 2022	1
593	Daniel Avery	Ultra Truth	Phantasy Sound	17 November 2022	1
594	Larkin Poe	Blood Harmony	Tricki-Woo	24 November 2022	1
595	Richard Dawson	The Ruby Cord	Domino	1 December 2022	1
596	In the Forest	These Last Walls	Last Night From Glasgow	8 December 2022	1
597	Derek Ryan	Pure and Simple	Sharpe Music	15 December 2022	2
598	Trashcan Sinatras	In the Music	Lo-Five	29 December 2022	1
2023
re	Lady Blackbird	Black Acid Soul	BMG	5 January 2023	1
599	Jockstrap	I Love You Jennifer B	Rough Trade	12 January 2023	1
600	Orlando Weeks	The Gritterman	Blood	19 January 2023	1
601	Trashcan Sinatras	A Happy Pocket	Last Night From Glasgow	26 January 2023	1
602	Katatonia	Sky Void of Stars	Napalm	2 February 2023	1
603	Mozart Estate	Pop-Up Ker-Ching and the Possibilities	Cherry Red	9 February 2023	1
604	Hi-Fi Sean and David McAlmont	Happy Ending	Plastique	16 February 2023	1
605	In Flames	Foregone	Nuclear Blast	23 February 2023	1
606	Pigs Pigs Pigs Pigs Pigs Pigs Pigs	Land of Sleeper	Rocket Recordings	2 March 2023	1
607	Hamish Hawk	Angel Numbers	Post Electric	9 March 2023	1
608	Enslaved	Heimdal	Nuclear Blast	16 March 2023	1
609	Dub Pistols	Frontline	Cyclone	23 March 2023	1
610	Trampolene	Rules of Love and War	Strap Originals	30 March 2023	1
611	Lankum	False Lankum	Rough Trade	6 April 2023	1
612	Ist Ist	Protagonists	Kind Violence	13 April 2023	1
613	Afflecks Paradise	The Only Light In This Tunnel Is The Oncoming Train	Spirit of Spike Island	20 April 2023	1
614	Overkill	Scorched	Nuclear Blast	27 April 2023	1
615	Bluey	Dance Mode	Demon	4 May 2023	1
616	Dream Machine	Thank God It's Dream Machine	Modern Sky	11 May 2023	1
617	The Lemon Twigs	Everything Harmony	Captured Tracks	18 May 2023	1
618	Craven Faults	Standers	The Leaf Label	25 May 2023	1
619	(G)I-dle	I Feel	Cube Entertainment	1 June 2023	1
620	Rhoda Dakar	Version Girl	Sunday Best	8 June 2023	1
621	Baxter Dury	I Thought I Was Better Than You	Heavenly	15 June 2023	1
622	Hak Baker	Worlds End FM	Hak Attack	22 June 2023	1
623	Steve Lukather	Bridges	The Players Club	29 June 2023	1
624	Luke Morley	Songs From the Blue Room	Luke Morley	6 July 2023	1
625	BDRMM	I Don't Know	Rock Action	13 July 2023	1
626	Julie Byrne	The Greater Wings	Ghostly International	20 July 2023	1
627	Vivian Stanshall	Rawlinson's End	Madfish	27 July 2023	1
628	The Lilac Time	Dance Till All the Stars Come Down	Poetica	3 August 2023	1
629	Brenda	Brenda	Last Night From Glasgow	10 August 2023	1
630	Prestige	Girl Ray	Moshi Moshi	17 August 2023	1
631	Tom Speight	Love + Light	Nettwerk	24 August 2023	1
632	Here At Last	EP1	Halo Army	31 August 2023	1
633	Holding Absence	The Noble Art of Self Destruction	Sharpe Tone	7 September 2023	1
634	Joel Stoker	The Undertow	Cooking Vinyl	14 September 2023	1
635	Coach Party	Killjoy	Chess Club	21 September 2023	1
636	The Bites	Squeeze	Earache	28 September 2023	1
637	Das Koolies	DK01	Strangetown	5 October 2023	1
638	Andrew Cushin	Waiting for the Rain	69	12 October 2023	1
639	John and Cody Carpenter	Anthology II (Movie Themes 1976-1988)	Sacred Bones	19 October 2023	1
640	The Mary Wallopers	Irish Rock N Roll	BC Recordings	26 October 2023	1
641	Apollo Junction	Here We Are	Shed Load	2 November 2023	1
642	Black Pumas	Chronicles of a Diamond	ATO	9 November 2023	1
643	Green Lung	This Heathen Land	Nuclear Blast	16 November 2023	1
644	Johnny Flynn/Robert Macfarlane	The Moon Also Rises	Transgressive	23 November 2023	1
645	Vince Clarke	Songs of Silence	Mute	30 November 2023	1
646	K'S	Live at Lafayette	Lab	7 December 2023	1
647	Harp	Albion	Bella Union	14 December 2023	1
re	Lankum	False Lankum	Rough Trade	21 December 2023	3
2024
re	The Mary Wallopers	Irish Rock N Roll	BC Recordings	11 January 2024	2
648	Marika Hackman	Big Sigh	Chrysalis	25 January 2024	1
649	South of Salem	Death of the Party	Spider Party	1 February 2024	1
650	Driver Era	Live at the Greek	Too	8 February 2024	1
651	Florence Black	Bed of Nails	Florence Black	15 February 2024	1
652	Dead South	Chains & Stakes	Six Shooter	22 February 2024	1
653	Katherine Priddy	The Pendulum Swing	Cooking Vinyl	29 February 2024	1
654	John Bramwell	The Light Fantastic	Townsend Music	7 March 2024	1
655	These Wicked Rivers	Force of Nature	Fat Earth	14 March 2024	1
656	Kim Gordon	The Collective	Matador	21 March 2024	1
657	Elles Bailey	Live at the Fire Station	Outlaw Music	28 March 2024	1
658	Hybrid Minds	Tides	Hybrid Music	4 April 2024	1
659	Courting	New Last Name	Lower Third	11 April 2024	1
660	Cock Sparrer	Hand on Heart	Captain Oi!/Cherry Red	18 April 2024	1
661	Bodega	Our Brand Could Be Yr Life	Chrysalis	25 April 2024	1
662	Paraorchestra	Death Songbook	World Circuit	2 May 2024	1
663	Bears in Trees	How to Build an Ocean: Instructions	I Sure Hope It Does	9 May 2024	1
664	Dea Matrona	For Your Sins	Dea Matrona	16 May 2024	1
665	Knocked Loose	You Won't Go Before You're Supposed To	Pure Noise	23 May 2024	1
666	Bright Light Bright Light	Enjoy Youth	YSKWN!	30 May 2024	1
667	Tom Ball	Curtain Call	Westway Music	6 June 2024	1
668	King Hannah	Big Swimmer	City Slang	13 June 2024	1
669	Bonny Light Horseman	Keep Me On Your Jind/See You Free	Jagjaguwar	20 June 2024	1
670	Kneecap	Fine Art	Heavenly	27 June 2024	1
671	Cavalera	Schizophrenia	Nuclear Blast	4 July 2024	1
672	Dirty Three	Love Changes Everything	Anchor & Hope	11 July 2024	1
673	Fink	Beauty in Your Wake	RcoupD	18 July 2024	1
674	Cassandra Jenkins	My Light, My Destroyer	Dead Oceans	25 July 2024	1
675	Orange Goblin	Science, Not Fiction	Peaceville	1 August 2024	1
676	Powerwolf	Wake Up the Wicked	Napalm	8 August 2024	1
677	Personal Trainer	Still Willing	Bella Union	15 August 2024	1
678	HammerFall	Avenge the Fallen	Nuclear Blast	22 August 2024	1
679	Southern River band	D.I.Y.	Cooking Vinyl	29 August 2024	1
680	Simone Simons	Vermillion	Nuclear Blast	5 September 2024	1
681	Yannis & The Yaw/Tony Allen	Lagos Paris London	Transgressive	12 September 2024	1
682	Boston Manor	Sundiver	Sharptone	19 September 2024	1
683	Nilüfer Yanya	My Method Actor	Ninja Tune	26 September 2024	1
684	Katy J Pearson	Someday Now	Heavenly	3 October 2024	1
685	Sophie	Sophie	Transgressive	10 October 2024	1
686	Sydnie Christmas	My Way	Westway Music	17 October 2024	2
687	Kelly Lee Owens	Dreamstate	DH2	31 October 2024	1
688	Cats in Space	Time Machine	Cherry Red	7 November 2024	1
689	Thus Love	All Pleasure	Captured Tracks	14 November 2024	1
690	Our Girl	The Good Kind	Bella Union	21 November 2024	1
691	Warmduscher	Too Cold to Hold	Strap Originals	28 November 2024	1
692	Kim Deal	Nobody Loves You More	4AD	5 December 2024	1
693	Jalen Ngonda	Come Around and Love Me	Daptone	12 December 2024	2
694	Muldoons	We Saw the View	Last Night From Glasgow	26 December 2024	1
2025
re	Kneecap	Fine Art	Heavenly	2 January 2025	3
695	The Halo Effect	March of the Unheard	Nuclear Blast	23 January 2025	1
696	Pastel	Souls in Motion	Spirit of Spike Island	30 January 2025	1
697	Larkin Poe	Bloom	Tricki-Woo	6 February 2025	1
698	Brooke Combe	Dancing at the Edge of the World	Modern Sky	13 February 2025	1
698	Bracknell	Falling Out of View	Beatlab	20 February 2025	1
699	Richard Dawson	End of the Middle	Weird World	27 February 2025	1
700	The Liminanas	Faded	Because Music	6 March 2025	1
701	Antony Szmierek	Service Station at the End of the Universe	Mushroom	13 March 2025	1
702	G-Dragon	Übermensch	Galaxy/Empire	20 March 2025	1
703	Constant Follower	The Smile You Send Out Returns to You	Last Night From Glasgow	27 March 2025	1
704	Japanese Breakfast	For Melancholy Brunettes (& Sad Women)	Dead Oceans	3 April 2025	1
705	Peter Capaldi	Sweet Illusions	Last Night From Glasgow	10 April 2025	1
706	Miki BerenyiTrio	Tripla	Bella Union	17 April 2025	1
707	Epica	Aspiral	Nuclear Blast	24 April 2025	1
708	Julien Baker and Torres	Send a Prayer My Way	Matador	1 May 2025	1
709	Viagra Boys	Viagr Aboys	Shrimptech Enterprises	8 May 2025	2
710	Mclusky	The World Is Still Here and So Are We	Ipecac	22 May 2025	1
711	Billy Nomates	Metalhorse	Invada	29 May 2025	1
712	Cardinal Black	Midnight at the Valencia	Jump In	5 June 2025	1
713	Caroline	Caroline 2	Rough Trade	12 June 2025	1
714	Brad Kella	Phoebe's Melody	Modern Sky	19 June 2025	1
715	King Gizzard & the Lizard Wizard	Phantom Island	p(doom)	26 June 2025	1
716	Million Dead	Harmony No Harmony	Xtra Mile	3 July 2025	1
717	DearALICE	bitterSWEETsummer	Gamma	10 July 2025	1
re	Kneecap	Fine Art	Heavenly	17 July 2025	1
718	Gwenno	Utopia	Cooperative Music	24 July 2025	1
719	Billie Marten	Dog Eared	Fiction	31 July 2025	1
720	Quadeca	Vanisher, Horizon Scraper	Many Hats	7 August 2025	1
721	New Eves	The New Eve is Rising	Transgressive	14 August 2025	1
722	Osees	Abomination Revealed at Last	Death God Corp	21 August 2025	1
723	Asco	Perfect Timing	Mulli Music Group	28 August 2025	1
724	Apollo Junction	What in the World	Shed Load	4 September 2025	1
725	Jehnny Beth	You Heartbreaker, You	Fiction	11 September 2025	1
re	Kneecap	Fine Art	Heavenly	18 September 2025	1
726	Baxter Dury	Allbarone	Heavenly	25 September 2025	1
727	Wednesday	Bleeds	Dead Oceans	2 October 2025	1
728	Polygon Window	Surfing on Sine Waves	Warp	9 October 2025	1
729	Kettama	Archangel	Steel City Dance Discs	16 October 2025	1
730	Warrington-Runcorn New Town	Public Works and Utilities	Castles in Space	23 October 2025	1
731	Brave Rival	5 to 4	Brave Rival	30 October 2025	1
732	Just Mustard	We Were Just Here	Partisan	6 November 2025	1
733	Swim School	Swim School	LAB	13 November 2025	1
734	Insecure Men	A Man For All Seasons	Fat Possum	20 November 2025	1
735	Highschool	Highschool	(Pias) Australia	27 November 2025	1
736	Spock's Beard	The Archaeoptimist	Madfish	4 December 2025	1
737	Freddie Halkon	Shoulders of the World	Freddie Halkon	11 December 2025	1
738	Tom Smith	There is Nothing in the Dark	Play It Again Sam	18 December 2025	1
739	C418	Minecraft – Volume Alpha	Ghostly International	25 December 2025	1
2026
740	Cameron Winter	Heavy Metal	Partisan	1 January 2026	3
741	Beyond the Black	Break the Silence	Nuclear Blast	22 January 2026	1
742	Kreator	Krushers of the World	Nuclear Blast	29 January 2026	1
743	Poppy	Empty Hands	Sumerian	5 February 2026	1
744	Tyler Ballgame	For the First Time Again	Rough Trade	12 February 2026	1
745	Puscifer	Normal Isn't	BMG	19 February 2026	1
746	The Cardinals	Masquerade	So Young	26 February 2026	1
747	Michael Monroe	Outerstellar	Silver Lining Music	5 March 2026	1
748	Andy White	Destination Beautiful	Last Night From Glasgow	12 March 2026	1
749	Dub Pistols/Freestylers	Enter the Sound	Cyclone	19 March 2026	1
750	The Orielles	Only You Left	Heavenly	26 March 2026	1
751	Tyketto	Closer to the Sun	Silver Lining	2 April 2026	1
752	Fcukers	Ö	Ninja Tune	9 April 2026	1
753	Angine de Poitrine	Vol. II	Angine de Poitrine	16 April 2026	1
754	Lime Garden	Maybe Not Tonight	So Young	23 April 2026	1
755	Seb Lowe	Seb Lowe	Seb Lowe	30 April 2026	1
756	Lausse the Cat	The Mocking Stars	Velvet Blues	7 May 2026	1
757	Brontes	Brontes	Last Night From Glasgow	14 May 2026	1
758	Girli	It's Just My Opinion	Believe	21 May 2026	1
759	Dove Ellis	Blizzard	Black Butter	28 May 2026	1
760	Billy Lockett	Things are Looking Up	Billy Lockett	4 June 2026	1
761	Doublespeak	Doublespeak	London	11 June 2026	1
762	Dea Matrona	Hate That I Care	AWAL	18 June 2026	1
763	Tarja	Frisson Noir	EarMusic	25 June 2026	1
764	Pye Corner Audio	More Songs About the Sun	Sonic Cathedral	2 July 2026	1
765	Jjerome87	The Canyon	Mushroom	9 July 2026	1
766	Frank & Walters	Grand Parade	Last Night From Glasgow	16 July 2026	1
767	Panda Bear and Sonic Boom	A Question of When	Domino	23 July 2026	1
768	Loathe	A Stranger to You	SharpTone	30 July 2026	1
769	Ren/In Patient/ Chris Webby	Asylum	Sick Boi Eightyhd	6 August 2026	1
770	The Durutti Column	Renascent	London Recordings	13 August 2026	1
771	Cancer Bats	Give Me Dirt	Marshall Amplification	20 August 2026	1
772	Getdown Services	Massive Champion	Breakfast	27 August 2026	1
773	Grandma's House	Baby Your'e a Winner	Brace Yourself	3 September 2026	1
774	Guest List	Something Real	Artist Theory	10 September 2026	1
775	Manaka Kataoka and Yasuaki Iwata	The Legend of Zelda - Breath of the Wild	Laced	17 September 2026	1
776	Meffs	Business	FLG	24 September 2026	1
777	Corella	A Beautiful World to Lose	FLG	1 October 2026	1
778	Gurriers	Nobody's Coming to Save You	Play It Again Sam	8 October 2026	1
779	These Wicked Rivers	Fire and Folklore	Fat Earth	15 October 2026	1
780	UnPeople	We Are UnPeople	Sharptone	22 October 2026	1
781	Gotts Street Park	Somewhere Between	Play It Again Sam	29 October 2026	1
782	Deco	Dreamhouse	Good Mood Music	5 November 2026	1
783	Ex Re	Save As	4AD	12 November 2026	1
784	Do Nothing	Friend World	Submarine Cat	19 November 2026	1

=== By record label ===
As of 6 November 2026, Fifteen Record Labels have spent four or more weeks at the top of the chart so far during the 2020s.

Record label	Number-one albums	Weeks at number one
Nuclear Blast	20	20
Heavenly	8	13
Last Night From Glasgow	10	10
Rough Trade	6	9
Bella Union	8	8
Dead Oceans	7	7
Partisan	5	7
BMG	6	7
Matador	6	6
Transgressive	6	6
Napalm	5	5
Cooking Vinyl	4	4
Modern Sky	4	4
Warp	4	4
Fat Possum	4	4

=== By Artist ===
As of 9 October 2026, Eight artists have spent three or more weeks at the top of the chart so far during the 2020s.

Artist	Number-one albums	Weeks at number one
Kneecap	1	5
Lankum	1	4
Ist Ist	3	3
Lady Blackbird	1	3
The Mary Wallopers	1	3
Trashcan Sinatras	1	3
Viagra Boys	2	3
Cameron Winter	1	3

== See also ==
- Lists of UK Independent Albums Chart number ones
