= The Art of Lying =

Studio album by Ist Ist
- Released: 26 November 2021
- Recorded: 2020
- Length: 38:22
- Label: Kind Violence Records
- Producer: Michael Whalley

Ist Ist chronology
Live from the Attic (2021)	The Art of Lying (2021)

Singles from The Art of Lying
- 1. "It Stops Where It Starts" Released: 10 September 2021; 2. "Extreme Greed" Released: 15 October 2021

Professional ratings
Review scores
Source	Rating
The Irish Times	4/5 stars
Sound of Violence	3/5 stars
Vinyl Chapters	2.5/5 stars

The Art of Lying is the second studio album by Manchester post-punk band Ist Ist. It was released on 26 November 2021 by Kind Violence Records. Including live material, this is the group's seventh album-length release. It is their first album to chart in the UK.

== Background ==
Ist Ist recorded the album during the multiple lockdowns of 2020. It was announced in August 2021 and was released on 26 November 2021. The following week, the album became Ist Ist's first charting release, after entering the UK Albums Chart at number 87. The cover of the album features the Eye of Shinjuku.

The Art of Lying continues themes of mental health issues and psychogeography found in their first studio album, Architecture, written during various lockdown stages. It also features anti-establishment and anti-capitalist themes.

== Reviews ==
Positive reviews followed the album's release. Tony Clayton-Lea of The Irish Times gave it 4/5 stars, positively comparing it to Joy Division calling their music 'a strain of solid-gold integrity and commitment.' French music publication Sound of Violence gave the album 3/5.

Callum Reid, writing for OriginalRock.net, called the album 'strong, solid and very listenable,' and compared it to the music of Joy Division, Ultravox and OMD.

Imogen Lawlor, writing for Vinyl Chapters, was less favourable towards the album, commenting that the music let down the album's critical lyrical themes.

'Josh' for RGM praised the album, but said it was lacking dynamically.

== Track listing ==
No.	Title	Length
1.	"Listening Through the Wall"	3:26
2.	"Fat Cats Drown in Milk"	3:19
3.	"Middle Distance"	3:43
4.	"Watching You Watching Me"	2:56
5.	"The Waves"	5:11
6.	"Extreme Greed"	4:14
7.	"It Stops Where It Starts"	3:08
8.	"If It Tastes Like Wine"	3:39
9.	"Heads on Spikes"	3:55
10.	"Don't Go Gentle"	4:47
Total length:		38:22

== Personnel ==
- Recorded by Michael Whalley

== Charts ==
Chart (2021)	Peak position
UK Albums (Official Charts)	87
