= Lust for Life, Or: 'How to Thread the Needle and Come Out the Other Side to Tell the Story' =

Studio album by Courting
- Released: 14 March 2025
- Genres: Electronica; pub rock; proto-punk; indie rock
- Length: 25:40
- Labels: Lower Third; PIAS
- Producer: Sean Murphy O'Neill

Courting chronology
New Last Name (2024)	Lust for Life, Or: 'How to Thread the Needle and Come Out the Other Side to Tell the Story' (2025)

Singles from Lust for Life
- 1. "Pause at You" Released: 20 November 2024; 2. "After You" Released: 20 January 2025; 3. "Namcy" Released: 11 March 2025

Lust for Life, Or: 'How to Thread the Needle and Come Out the Other Side to Tell the Story', shortened to Lust for Life, is the third studio album by British rock band Courting. The follow-up to their hyperpop-influenced second album, New Last Name (2024), it was released on 14 March 2025 via Lower Third and PIAS. It received critical acclaim upon release.

== Composition ==
In an interview with NME, Courting frontman Sean Murphy O'Neill said the first part of the album title, Lust for Life, "has so much storied history and lore" in music, with artists like Lana Del Rey and Iggy Pop both using it themselves. The second half reflects the more "extreme and bizarre" approach they took to songwriting.

Each track on the album has a "twin song" which reuses musical motifs and themes. For example "Rollback Intro" and "Likely Place For Them to Be" feature the same string melody, but the latter adds heavy distortion and electrification.

== Release ==
Courting announced the details of their forthcoming third studio album on 20 November 2024, when lead single "Pause at You" was issued.'' In a press release, frontman Sean Murphy O'Neill claimed with this record, the band "wanted to keep everything incredibly direct — to hit everyone in the face and leave". The next two singles, "After You" and "Namcy", were released in January and March respectively.

== Critical reception ==
Professional ratings
Aggregate scores
Source	Rating
Metacritic	84/100
Review scores
Source	Rating
AllMusic	4/5 stars
Clash	7/10
MusicOMH	4/5 stars
NME	4/5 stars
The Observer	5/5 stars

Lust for Life has received positive reception from critics. On review aggregator Metacritic, it currently has a 84/100 rating based on 8 critic reviews, indicating "universal acclaim".

Writing for The Observer, Damien Morris gave the album five stars, branding it a "giant leap forward" and praising the addition of string instrumentals and saxophones to "fill their sound". Ben Broyd of Clash described the album as "infectious". In a four-star review for AllMusic, Mark Deming wrote that "the ideas that Courting were working with on 2022's Guitar Music and [New Last Name] are fully realized on Lust for Life, even as the music sounds more streamlined and direct than before". Otis Robinson for NME described the album's sound as "Kasabian-indebted electronica, pub rock and proto-punk", further commenting that the album is "indie music for pop fans and pop music for indie fans – there's enough for everyone to take a bite".

== Track listing ==
All tracks are written by Courting (Sean Murphy-O'Neill, Connor McCann, Joshua Cope and Sean Thomas), except where noted.

Lust for Life, Or: 'How to Thread the Needle and Come Out the Other Side to Tell the Story' standard edition track listing
No.	Title	Writer(s)	Length
1.	"Rollback Intro"	Murphy-O'Neill; Tom Louis Ross	0:48
2.	"Stealth Rollback"	Murphy-O'Neill; James Dring	2:43
3.	"Pause at You"		3:07
4.	"Namcy"		3:12
5.	"Eleven Sent (This Time)"		3:44
6.	"After You"		2:28
7.	"Lust for Life"		6:27
8.	"Likely Place for Them to Be"		3:08
Total length:			25:40

How to Thread the Needle and Come Out the Other Side to Tell the Story, Or: 'Lust for Life' deluxe edition additional track listing
No.	Title	Writer(s)	Length
9.	"Rollback Freestyle" (with RXKNephew and Grey Streak)	Murphy-O'Neill; Sebastian Westwood; Kristopher Williams	1:46
10.	"The Twins (1969)"		2:52
11.	"Pause at You" (Meg Ward's Wavy Remix)
12.	"Namcy" (DJ Streaks remix)
13.	"Eleven Sent" (demo)
14.	"Pause at You" (live)
15.	"Likely Place for Them to Be" (live)

Note

- "Likely Place for Them to Be" is stylized in sentence case.

== Personnel ==
=== Courting ===
- Sean Murphy-O'Neill – production (all tracks); lead vocals, electric guitar (tracks 2–8); bass guitar, piano (2); percussion (3, 7)
- Sean Thomas – drums (tracks 2–8), percussion (3, 4), background vocals (6, 7)
- Joshua Cope – bass guitar (track 3), electric guitar (4–8), lead vocals (6)
- Connor McCann – bass guitar (tracks 4–8), background vocals (6)

=== Additional contributors ===
- James Dring – mixing
- Tom Louis Ross – violin (tracks 1, 4, 8), cello (1)
- Joe Gordon Potts – piano (track 3), violin (5)
- Anna Kunz – background vocals (tracks 3, 6)

== Charts ==
Chart performance for Lust for Life, Or: 'How to Thread the Needle and Come Out the Other Side to Tell the Story'
Chart (2025)	Peak position
Scottish Albums (Official Charts)	54
UK Album Downloads (Official Charts)	100
UK Independent Albums (Official Charts)	39
