= Guitar Music (Courting album) =

Studio album by Courting
- Released: 23 September 2022
- Recorded: 2021
- Genre: Post-punk; hyperpop
- Length: 31:58
- Label: PIAS
- Producer: James Dring

Courting chronology
Grand National (2021)	Guitar Music (2022)	New Last Name (2024)

Singles from Guitar Music
- 1. "Tennis" Released: 5 April 2022; 2. "Loaded" Released: 25 May 2022; 3. "Jumper" Released: 16 August 2022

Guitar Music is the debut studio album from British band Courting. It was released on 23 September 2022 by PIAS Recordings. The album combines the genres of art punk, post-punk, and hyperpop, and was produced by James Dring, with songwriting and recording taking place between late 2021 and early 2022. The album featured three promotional singles: "Tennis", "Loaded", and "Jumper". Despite mixed reviews for the singles, the album received generally favourable reviews from critics. The music was composed by band members Sean Murphy-O'Neill and Sean Thomas.

== Style and composition ==
The album has been described as a fusion genre between art punk, post-punk, and hyperpop.

== Release and promotion ==
Songwriting took place in 2021, and recording took place in late 2021 into early 2022. The album was produced by James Dring.

=== Singles ===
Guitar Music had three singles that were released ahead of the album in promotion of the release. The lead-off single, "Tennis", was released on 5 April 2022. The single was described by NME as tongue-in-cheek, and playful. The band described "Tennis" as "a paypig's personal redemption narrative, set in "the city", and told in two parts: A twisted tale of two lovers' back and forth, bound by cricket, bodybuilding and money. A story as old as time". The second single, "Loaded", was released on 25 May 2022.

"Jumper" is the third and final single before the album was released. The single, released on 16 August 2022. In an interview with DIY, the band described the song as "an outlier on the album". Sean Murphy-O’Neil further said of the album that it "is a gentle story of true unrequited love, meant to playout like a 2006 romcom. It is about growing old and believing everything will fall into place, the mundanity of doing dishes, and leaving oppositional film reviews.

== Critical reception ==
Professional ratings
Aggregate scores
Source	Rating
Metacritic	78/100
Review scores
Source	Rating
AllMusic	3.5/5 stars
Clash	4/5 stars
DIY	4/5 stars
Gigwise	9/10 stars
God Is in the TV	8/10
NME	4/5 stars
Pitchfork	7.3/10

Guitar Music was met with "generally favorable" reviews from critics. At Metacritic, which assigns a weighted average rating out of 100 to reviews from mainstream publications, this release received an average score of 78, based on 5 reviews.

== Track listing ==
All music is composed by Sean Murphy-O'Neill and Sean Thomas.

Guitar Music track listing
No.	Title	Length
1.	"Cosplay / Twin Cities"	2:58
2.	"Tennis"	3:14
3.	"Loaded"	3:34
4.	"Famous"	3:19
5.	"Crass (Redux)"	2:49
6.	"Jumper"	3:39
7.	"Uncanny Valley Forever"	8:46
8.	"PDA"	3:36
Total length:		31:58

== Personnel ==
Courting

- Sean Murphy-O'Neill
- Sean Thomas
- Joshua Cope
- Connor McCann

Production, artwork, and mastering

- Alex Bex – photography
- Nathan Chinn – assistant engineer
- Matt Colton – mastering
- James Dring – mixing, producer
- Holly Minto – trumpet
- Claudius Mittendorfer – mixing
- Charlie Puth – photography
- Thomas Harrington Rawle – artwork
- Kieran Shudall – composer
- Grant Watling – assistant engineer
- Charles Watson – background vocals
- Robert Whiteley – engineer

== Charts ==
Chart performance for Guitar Music
Chart (2022)	Peak position
Scottish Albums (OCC)	43
UK Independent Albums (OCC)	21
