= Bedroom (album) =

Studio album by Bdrmm
- Released: 3 July 2020
- Genre: Shoegaze
- Length: 41:39
- Label: Sonic Cathedral
- Producer: Alex Greaves

Bdrmm chronology
| Bedroom (2020) | I Don't Know (2023) |

Bedroom is the debut studio album by British shoegaze band Bdrmm, released on 3 July 2020 through Sonic Cathedral. It was produced by Alex Greaves and received positive reviews from critics.

== Critical reception ==
Professional ratings
Aggregate scores
| Source | Rating |
|---|---|
| Metacritic | 83/100 |
Review scores
| Source | Rating |
| AllMusic | 3.5/5 stars |
| Clash | 8/10 |
| The Line of Best Fit | 8.5/10 |
| MusicOMH | 4/5 stars |
| NME | 5/5 stars |
| Under the Radar | 4/5 stars |

Bedroom received a score of 80 out of 100 on review aggregator Metacritic based on nine critics' reviews, indicating "generally favorable" reception. Q stated that the album "might feel too in thrall to their heroes at times. ... But Bdrmm's world of noise is so artfully constructed it's hard to not find yourself lost within it", while Uncut called it a "strong debut throughout" and Mojo felt the band "treads the queasy tightrope of prime Cure, Ride etc with real dexterity".

Paul Simpson of AllMusic found that "the group seem well-versed in dream pop and post-punk, with a hazy but clean guitar sound and steady, propulsive drumming that nods to Krautrock and space rock". Chris Todd of The Line of Best Fit remarked that while "it may be retro in its thinking, [...] on this debut bdrmm have proved to be forward thinking in execution. An assured and brilliant debut." NME's Rhys Buchanan noted that the band "have channelled the emotional turmoil around growing up into a modern shoegaze classic", calling it "a glorious and human introduction".

Graeme Marsh of MusicOMH wrote that "for a first full collection, Bedroom is a resounding success. bdrmm have chosen a well-worn path, but there's a freshness here nevertheless." Under the Radar's Dom Gourlay described it as "a concept album of sorts that switches moods with every key, whether it be subtle instrumental opener 'Momo' or its segue into the dizzy heights of 'Push/Pull'". He concluded by calling it "a confident and assured debut that demands a sequel". Clash's Robin Murray felt the album "gives the band room to fully explore their sonic palette, resulting in a project of real depth and no small degree of emotional heft", describing it as a "vital listen" as well as "much more than a genre piece".

== Track listing ==
Bedroom track listing
| No. | Title | Length |
|---|---|---|
| 1. | "Momo" | 3:35 |
| 2. | "Push / Pull" | 4:50 |
| 3. | "A Reason to Celebrate" | 3:44 |
| 4. | "Gush" | 3:46 |
| 5. | "Happy" | 3:46 |
| 6. | "(The Silence)" | 2:43 |
| 7. | "(Un)Happy" | 3:23 |
| 8. | "If...." | 4:51 |
| 9. | "Is That What You Wanted to Hear?" | 5:17 |
| 10. | "Forget the Credits" | 5:44 |
| Total length: | | 41:39 |

== Charts ==
Chart performance for Bedroom
| Chart (2020) | Peak position |
|---|---|
| Scottish Albums (Official Charts) | 58 |
| UK Album Downloads (Official Charts) | 49 |
| UK Independent Albums (Official Charts) | 11 |
