= Come Around and Love Me =

Studio album by Jalen Ngonda
- Released: 8 September 2023
- Recorded: 2021–2022
- Studio: Hive Mind Studios (Brooklyn)
- Genre: Soul; R&B; rock
- Length: 33:00
- Label: Daptone
- Producer: Vincent Chiarito; Michael Buckley

Jalen Ngonda chronology
Talking About Mary (2018)	Come Around and Love Me (2023)	Doctrine of Love (2026)

Singles from Come Around and Love Me
- 1. "Just Like You Used To" Released: 7 September 2022; 2. "What a Difference She Made" Released: 11 October 2022; 3. "If You Don't Want My Love" Released: 22 March 2023; 4. "Come Around and Love Me" Released: 29 June 2023; 5. "That's All I Wanted from You" Released: 26 July 2023; 6. "So Glad I Found You" Released: 23 August 2023

Come Around and Love Me is the debut studio album by American musician Jalen Ngonda. It was released on 8 September 2023, through Daptone Records. Primarily a Motown-inspired soul record, the album also explores elements of R&B and rock music. Come Around and Love Me features 11 tracks produced by former Charles Bradley's Extraordinaires members Vincent Chiarito and Michael Buckley.

The album was preceded by six singles, including the title track "Come Around and Love Me"; which peaked at No. 9 on both the UK Physical Singles Chart and UK Vinyl Singles Chart. Following its release, Come Around and Love Me peaked at No. 1 on the UK Independent Album Breakers Chart, No. 33 on the Scottish Albums Chart, and No. 18 on the UK Physical Albums Chart.

== Background ==
Plans for Come Around and Love Me began to take fruition prior to the start of the COVID-19 pandemic, but were swiftly put on hold due to worldwide lockdowns. In 2021, Ngonda – a new signing for Daptone Records – flew to Brooklyn, New York City, to work on the album. At Hive Mind Studios, he began writing and recording Come Around and Love Me with help from Vincent Chiarito and Michael Buckley, two former members of Charles Bradley's Extraordinaries.

On 7 September 2022, Ngonda released the first single from the album, "Just Like You Used To". The second single "What a Difference She Made" was released a month later on 11 October 2022. On 22 March 2023, the third single "If You Don't Want My Love" was released to positive reception. In the months leading up to the album, the final singles "Come Around and Love Me", "That's All I Wanted from You", and "So Glad I Found You" were released.

== Critical reception ==
Upon release, Come Around and Love Me received overwhelmingly positive reviews from critics.

Rolling Stone included Ngonda in its annual Future of Music list, describing the album as "full of life, its lyrics unashamedly romantic and delivered with earnest enthusiasm by Ngonda, a singer with enough potential to carry an entire soul revival on his back if required". Will Richards of NME gave the album 4/5 stars, further praising Ngonda's vocals; "it's this virtuosic singing and the pure charisma bursting out of every sinew that sets the album, and Ngonda, apart", and "as it is, the debut album sets the table for a vibrant new soul singer with the world at his feet".

Damien Morris of The Guardian simply called the album "stunning", and pointed out that "some may dismiss it as too derivative of David Ruffin's tone, or Marvin Gaye's range, from delicate falsetto down the octaves, but they won't be able to deny how insanely listenable it is". Alexis Petridis of The Guardian gave the album 5/5 stars, describing Come Around and Love Me as "half an hour of untrammelled joy", claiming there was "a freshness and immediacy to [Ngonda's] songwriting that sidesteps any sense of someone merely trying to recreate the past".

Roisin O'Connor of The Independent described the critical reception of the album as "effusive", going further to label Come Around and Love Me as "a gorgeous collection of sepia-toned soul, R&B, rock and doo-wop". David Nobakht of Buzz Magazine gave the album 5/5 stars, claiming Ngonda has a "vocal range that effortlessly equals Marvin Gaye's" and asserting "this is music that makes living and listening both worthwhile".

== Track listing ==
No.	Title	Length
1.	"Come Around and Love Me"	3:04
2.	"If You Don't Want My Love"	2:26
3.	"Lost"	3:28
4.	"That's All I Wanted from You"	2:36
5.	"Please Show Me"	3:02
6.	"Just Like You Used To"	3:09
7.	"What a Difference She Made"	2:55
8.	"Give Me Another Day"	3:24
9.	"So Glad I Found You"	3:16
10.	"It Takes a Fool"	3:05
11.	"Rapture"	2:28
