= Grand National (EP) =

EP by Courting
- Released: 9 April 2021
- Recorded: 2019–2020
- Genre: Post-punk; indie rock; art punk
- Length: 13:19
- Label: Nice Swan
- Producer: Robert Whiteley; Sean Murphy O'Neill

Courting chronology
Grand National (2021)	Guitar Music (2022)

Singles from Grand National
- 1. "Popshop!" Released: 5 November 2020; 2. "Grand National" Released: 11 March 2021

Grand National is the debut extended play by British band, Courting. The EP was released on 9 April 2021 through Nice Swan Recordings.

== Critical reception ==
Professional ratings
Review scores
Source	Rating
DIY	3.5/5 stars
Dork	5/5 stars
Riot	7/10
When the Horn Blows	3/5 stars

Grand National received generally positive review from contemporary music critics. Alex Cabré, writing for DIY described the EP as "heavy-handed with their influences but endearing enough to get away with it." Cabré compared Courting heavily to compatriot band, Sports Team, saying that "frontman Sean Murphy-O’Neill is a pint-sized Alex Rice, a cavalier jabberer whose tone is an inch the right side of irritating as he rips into horse racing culture and Brexit Britain over an instrumental that should tick a few boxes for any Sports Team fan."

Jamie MacMillan, writing for Dork praised Grand National giving it a perfect five-star rating. MacMillan called Grand National an "exciting early sound of a band trying on different outfits to see what fits."

== Track listing ==
All music is composed by Sean Murphy-O'Neill, Sean Thomas, Michael Downes, and Sam Brennan.

Grand National track listing
No.	Title	Length
1.	"Grand National"	3:32
2.	"Popshop!"	2:09
3.	"Crass"	2:53
4.	"Slow Burner"	4:42
Total length:		13:19

== Personnel ==
- Courting – drums, lead vocals, bass guitar, guitar, cowbell
- Sean Murphy O'Neill – lyrics, co-producer
- Tom Woodhead – mastering
- Robert Whiteley – producer
- Nathan Chinn – technician
- Martha Mckay – violin
