= Honeyglaze =

British indie rock band

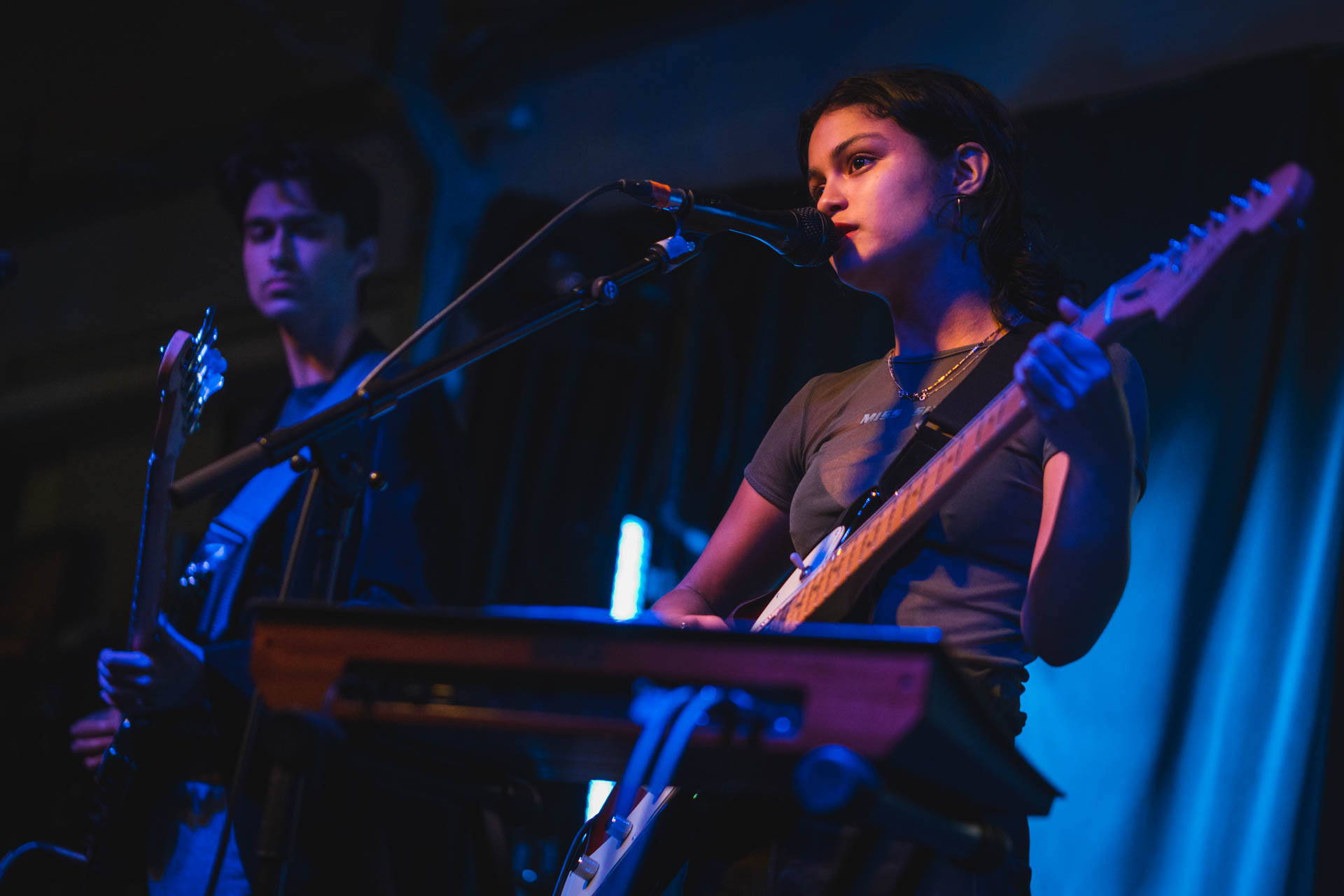
- Honeyglaze performing at Rough Trade in 2022

Background information
- Genres: indie rock; post-punk; math rock
- Years active: 2019–present
- Labels: Speedy Wunderground; Fat Possum Records
- Members: Anouska Sokolow; Tim Curtis; Yuri Shibuichi

Honeyglaze are an indie rock trio from South London formed by Anouska Sokolow with Tim Curtis and Yuri Shibuichi. They released a self-titled LP in 2022 followed by the album Real Deal in 2024.

== Members ==
- Anouska Sokolow (born 1999), vocals and guitar
- Tim Curtis, bass
- Yuri Shibuichi, drums

== Career ==
Starting as a solo artist, Anouska Sokolow came up with the concept for Honeyglaze and met bassist Tim Curtis and drummer Yuri Shibuichi shortly before the COVID-19 lockdown. Over the course of 2020, they worked on their debut LP from a place of isolation.

Upon watching of a YouTube video of their FarmFest performance, producer Dan Carey discovered the band and signed them to his label Speedy Wunderground. Honeyglaze released their debut single "Burglar" in September 2021. The trio performed at the Green Man Festival and Sŵn in Wales, and had gigs with likes of Drug Store Romeos, the Lounge Society, Katy J Pearson and Sunflower Bean.

In the lead up to their self-titled debut LP, Honeyglaze released the track "Shadows". Its music video was co-directed by Asha Lorenz of the band Sorry and Flo Webb. The LP reached #1 on the UK Independent Album Breakers Chart. Honeyglaze were invited to support Wet Leg on the UK leg of their 2022 tour and embarked on headline dates. Honeyglaze opened the BBC Music Introducing stage at Reading and Leeds. They also featured at the Great Escape Festival, Victorious Festival, Reeperbahn and Latitude Festival.

In 2024, Honeyglaze signed with Fat Possum Records, through which they released the album Real Deal. They also released the singles "Don't", "Cold Caller", and "Pretty Girls". The music video for "Don't" was nominated for Best Rock / Alternative Video – Newcomer at the 2024 UK Music Video Awards.

== Artistry ==
When asked what they listened to upon creating their debut LP, Honeyglaze answered Brian Blade & the Fellowship Band, Sasami, Squid, Dirty Projectors, and Puma Blue, as well as Cate Le Bon. Fergal Kinney in his review of the EP for Loud and Quiet compared Honeyglaze to Le Bon and The Orielles. Vocally, Sokolow stated she admires the "strong" vocals of Angel Olsen and Adrianne Lenker.

For Real Deal, Honeyglaze published an "influences playlist" in Flood Magazine, with each member of the trio naming three influences. Sokolow drew from The Zombies' rhythms and Destiny's Child's riffs, and praised Scott Walker's songwriting, calling it "cinematic". Curtis appreciated Radiohead's "unapologetic devotion to being melodramatic, epic, and also sad"; he also named Ought and Warpaint. Shibuichi credited Tony Allen with introducing him to Afrobeats and new approaches to drum lines. He said Big Thief "impacted our way of feeling" while making the album, and that they also continuously listened to Pinback and American Football.

In 2025, Henrietta Taylor of The Guardian compared Honeyglaze to the band English Teacher.

== Discography ==
=== Albums ===
- Real Deal (2024)

=== LPs ===
- Honeyglaze (2022)

=== Singles ===
- "One Must Imagine Santa Claus Happy" (2019)
- "Burglar" (2021)
- "Creative Jealousy" (2021)
- "Shadows" (2022)
- "Female Lead" (2022)
- "Don't" (2022)
- "Cold Caller" (2024)
- "Pretty Girls" (2024)
- "Turn Out Right" (2025)

=== Music videos ===
Year	Song	Director
2021	"Burglar"	Alex Evans
2022	"Shadows"	Asha Lorenz and Flo Webb
2022	"Female Lead"	James Ogram and Anouska Sokolow
2024	"Don't"	James Ogram
2024	"Pretty Girls"	James Ogram
