= Jalen Ngonda =

American soul musician

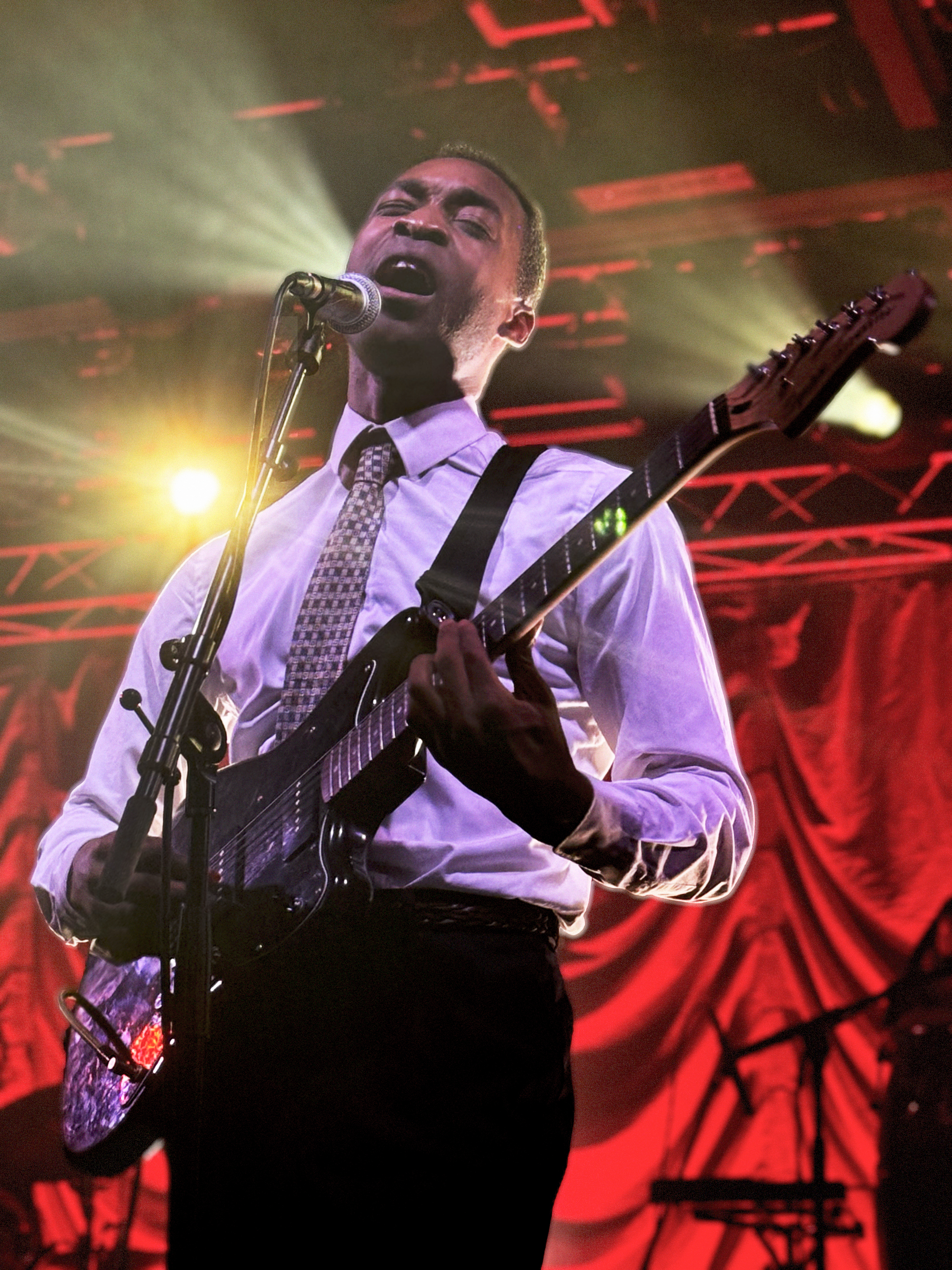
- Ngonda performing in Liverpool in 2025
- Born: Jalen N'Gonda; 22 February 1994 (age 32); Wheaton, Maryland, U.S.
- Education: Liverpool Institute for Performing Arts
- Occupations: Singer; songwriter; guitarist; keyboardist
- Years active: 2014–present
- Musical career
- Genres: Soul; R&B; rock
- Instruments: Vocals; guitar; keyboard; drums
- Label: Daptone

Jalen N'Gonda (stylized as Jalen Ngonda; born 1994) is an American musician based in England. He came to prominence with the release of his debut studio album Come Around and Love Me (2023), and is known for his Motown-inspired soul music. N'Gonda is primarily a singer, but also plays various instruments during live performances.

== Early life ==
Jalen N'Gonda was born in Wheaton, Maryland in 1994. At age 11, N'Gonda discovered his love of Motown after listening to "My Girl" by The Temptations from his father's record collection. Eventually, his parents saved up to purchase N'Gonda a Fender Squier. By age 16, N'Gonda was proficient in drums, guitar, piano and singing.

At age 19, N'Gonda watched a documentary about a New York performing arts school and began to plan for his future, before learning about the Liverpool Institute for Performing Arts. N'Gonda enquired about enrolling, with the school's response indicating they had listened to his music on SoundCloud and personally encouraged him to apply. With funds raised from N'Gonda's family and local church, he secured a place at LIPA and booked a one-way flight to Liverpool to pursue a career in music.

== Career ==
N'Gonda completed a foundation year at LIPA, before dropping out mid-way through his first year, in an effort to continue producing and self-releasing his music. He performed songs at local shows in Liverpool. Within a couple of years, N'Gonda had received multiple offers from record labels, performed at London's Royal Festival Hall and supported Lauryn Hill and Martha Reeves on tour.

In 2022, N'Gonda signed with Daptone Records to record his debut studio album Come Around and Love Me (2023). The album peaked at number 68 on the UK Albums Chart, number 4 on the UK Album Downloads Chart, and reached number one on the UK Independent Album Breakers Chart. The album released to critical acclaim, and received praise from Snoop Dogg, Kehlani, and Olivia Dean. Elton John included the album's title track on his list of favorite 2023 songs, and further labelled N'Gonda as an artist to watch.

In August 2024, N'Gonda performed on the West Holts stage at Glastonbury Festival, and returned in June 2025 on The Park stage with The Guardian calling the performance "stunning".

In February 2024, N'Gonda released the single "Illusions", which peaked at number 78 on the UK Singles Sales Chart. In October 2024, N'Gonda released "Anyone in Love", which peaked at number 21 on the UK Singles Sales Chart, and number 14 on the UK Singles Downloads Chart.

In 2025, Rolling Stone included N'Gonda in their annual Future of Music list, describing him as the "leading soul revivalist of this decade". In April 2025, N'Gonda won Soul Act of the Year at the Jazz FM Awards.

In March 2026, N'Gonda announced his second studio album, Doctrine of Love, would be released on 5 June.

== Discography ==
=== Studio albums ===
List of studio albums, with selected details, and chart positions
Title	Details	Peak chart positions	
Title	Details	UK	SCO
Come Around and Love Me	Released: 8 September 2023; Label: Daptone; Formats: CD, cassette, digital download, streaming, vinyl	— (Note: Come Around and Love Me did not enter the UK Albums Chart, but peaked at number 18 on the UK Albums Sales Chart.)	33
Doctrine of Love	Released: 5 June 2026; Label: Daptone; Formats: CD, vinyl, digital download, streaming	29	9

=== EPs ===
- Talking About Mary (2018)

=== Singles ===
List of singles as lead artist, with select chart positions, showing year released and album name
Title	Year	Peak chart positions	Album
Title	Year	UK Sales	Album
"Holler (When You Call My Name)"	2016	—	Non-album singles
"Why I Try"	2017	—	Non-album singles
"I Need You"	2017	—	Non-album singles
"I Guess That Makes Me a Loser"	2018	—	Talking About Mary
"We Fell Out of Love"	2018	—	Talking About Mary
"Just Like You Used To"	2022	—	Come Around and Love Me
"What a Difference She Made"	2022	—	Come Around and Love Me
"If You Don't Want My Love"	2023	—	Come Around and Love Me
"Come Around and Love Me"	2023	—	Come Around and Love Me
"That's All I Wanted from You"	2023	—	Come Around and Love Me
"So Glad I Found You"	2023	—	Come Around and Love Me
"Illusions"	2024	78	Non-album singles
"Here to Stay"	2024	—	Non-album singles
"Anyone in Love"	2024	21	Non-album singles
"Just as Long as We're Together"	2025	—	Non-album singles
"All About Me"	2025	68	Non-album singles
"Doctrine of Love"	2026	—	Doctrine of Love
"Hang It on the Shelf"	2026	—	Doctrine of Love
"—" denotes recording that did not chart in that territory.

== Awards and nominations ==
Year	Awards	Category	Nominee	Result	Ref
2025	Jazz FM Awards	Soul Act of the Year	Jalen Ngonda	Won	
