= Elles Bailey =

English musician

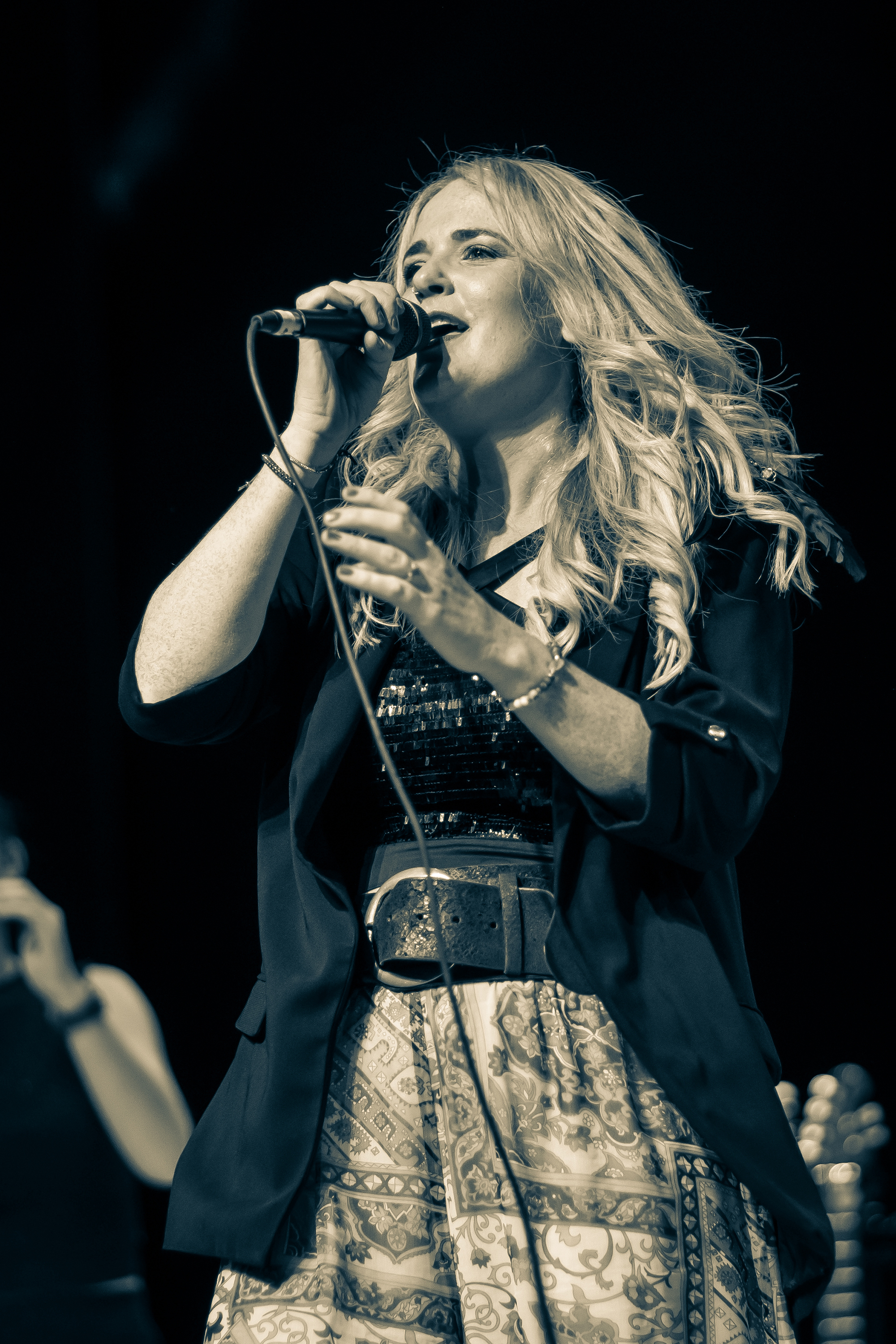
- Elles Bailey at The Stables MK 05 in February 2023

Background information
- Born: Bristol, England
- Genres: Blues rock; Americana; rock
- Occupations: Singer-songwriter; pianist; radio presenter
- Instruments: Vocals; piano
- Years active: 2010s–present
- Labels: Outlaw Music, Cooking Vinyl
- Website: ellesbailey.com

Elles Bailey is an English blues roots, rock singer, songwriter, and pianist. She has recorded five studio albums, including her debut album Wildfire in 2017, Road I Call Home in 2019, Shining in the Half Light in 2022, Beneath the Neon Glow in 2024 and Can't Take My Story Away in 2026.

Bailey has won several awards for her work. She is also a presenter on Planet Rock Radio with her own weekly show.

In 2024, Bailey released her highest charting album to date when Beneath the Neon Glow peaked at number 12 in the UK Albums Chart, number 4 in the Official Scottish Chart and reached number 1 on the Official Jazz and Blues Albums Chart and number 2 on Official Americana Albums Chart.

Her 2022 studio album Shining in the Half Light produced by Dan Weller reached 42 on the UK Albums Chart, reached number 1 on the Official Jazz and Blues Albums Chart and number 2 on the Official Americana Albums Chart. In January 2023, The Official Charts Company announced that Shining in the Half Light had reached number 39 out of the top 40 best selling albums in the Official Americana Albums Chart in 2022.

On tour, apart from her own headline appearances, Bailey has provided the opening act for Jools Holland, Don McLean, Van Morrison, Eric Gales, Mike Farris, the Kris Barras Band and King King.

In June 2025, Bailey supported Rag'n'Bone Man on selected dates of his UK summer tour, including an appearance at Llangollen Pavilion on 27 June 2025, where they performed together on stage on the song "Anywhere Away from Here". Bailey sang the vocal part originally recorded by Pink on Rag'n'Bone Man's album Life by Misadventure.

== Early life and career ==
Elles Bailey was born in Bristol, England. At the age of three she was hospitalised as a result of contracting viral and bacterial pneumonia, which meant that she had to breathe through a tube for 17 days. The result was she emerged with a husky deep voice, which shocked her parents and necessitated further examination to ensure that no serious damage had occurred. She was introduced to music via her father's record collection; mostly Chess Records' blues and rock and roll discs. She began fronting a local indie rock band, before the pull of her love of the blues and Americana, led Bailey to assemble a compatible touring band. Her debut EP, Who Am I to Me (2015), was followed by the six-track collection The Elberton Sessions (2016). The band toured and became noted for its powerful performances at gigs.

== Professional career ==
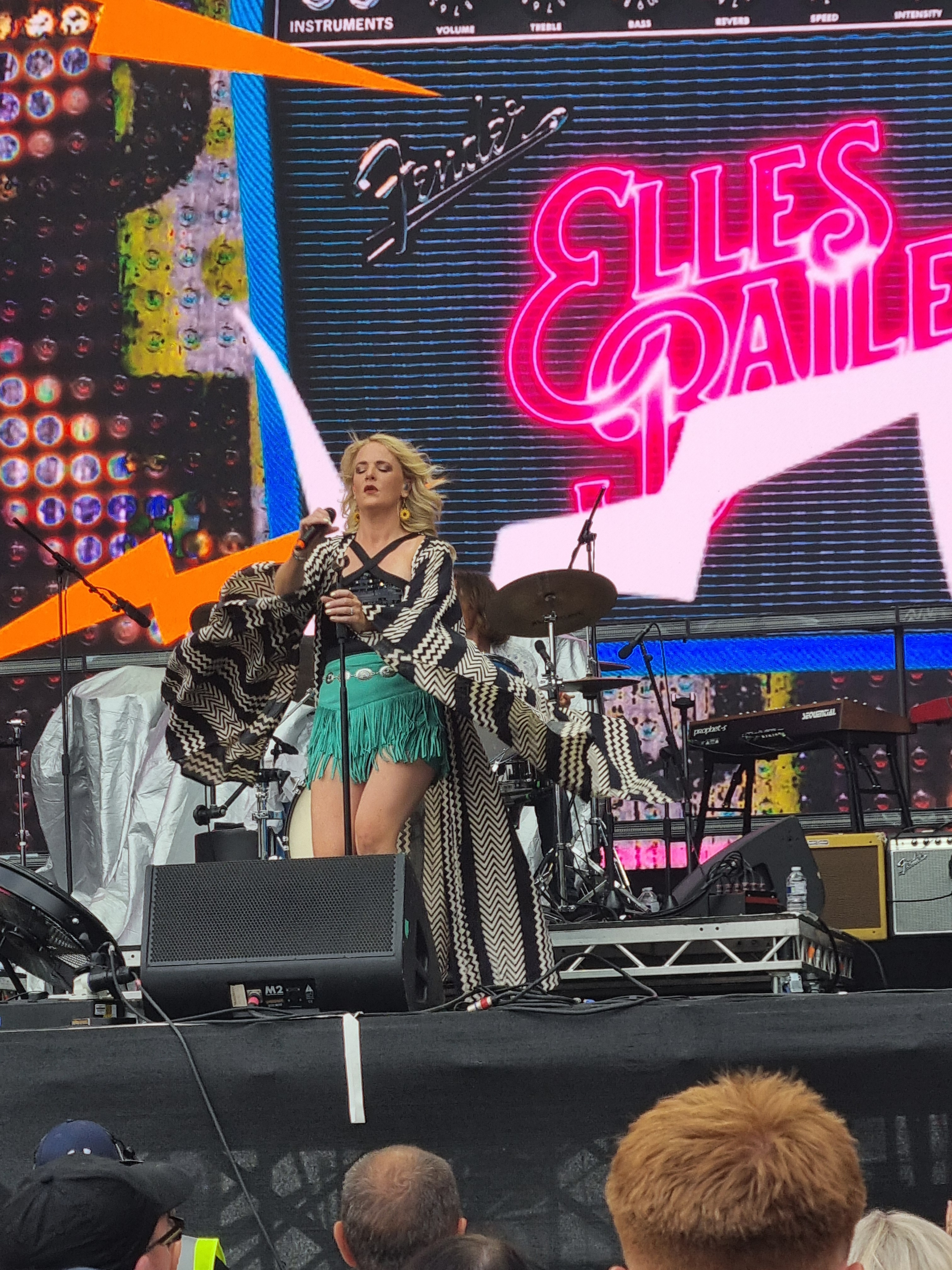
Elles Bailey in 2025

Bailey's debut studio album for Outlaw Music, Wildfire (2017), was recorded in Nashville, Tennessee, under the guidance of record producer Brad Nowell. Bailey co-wrote the majority of the 12 tracks on the collection, but included her rendition of Taylor Swift's "Shake It Off". Immediately after the recording was finalised, Bailey and her band (which included Brent Mason) toured both North America and the UK. The album was preceded on 10 February 2017 by the single release of the track "Wildfire". In 2019, Bailey's next studio album, Road I Call Home, reached the top of the UK Blues Chart. It was recorded in Nashville, with recordings jammed in between a 97-date concert tour across Europe. It was awarded the 'Album of the Year' gong at UK Blues Awards with another going to Bailey as 'Artist of the Year'. During the COVID-19 pandemic, Bailey gave out a series of livestream recordings of her versions of others' recorded music. The resultant studio album, Ain't Nothing But, received a nomination for 'Blues Album of the Year' at the 2021 UK Blues Awards, where she was named 'Artist of the Year' for the second consecutive year.

Her next studio album, Shining in the Half Light, was recorded in Devon in the midst of a COVID-19 lockdown when Bailey was months into her pregnancy. She co-wrote the entire album's-worth of songs with collaborators from around the globe. It was produced by Dan Weller. The main musicians used included Joe Wilkins (guitar), Jonny Henderson (keyboards), Matthew Waer (bass guitar) and Matthew Jones (drums). It was released on 25 February 2022. Due to the logistics surrounding the recording processes, Bailey listened to the album's final mixes while in hospital awaiting to give birth. To add to the difficulties, Bailey herself caught COVID-19 only weeks after the album's launch date.

In February 2024, Bailey announced her signing to Cooking Vinyl for her new album due later that year. She released her fourth studio album, Beneath the Neon Glow, on 9 August 2024.

== Chart positions and awards ==
In 2020, "Little Piece of Heaven" taken from her 2019 studio album, Road I Call Home (co-written with Bobby Wood and Dan Auerbach), gained the 'UK Song of the Year' title at the 2020 Americana Music Honors & Awards.

Shining in the Half Light reached number 42 in the UK Albums Chart, peaked at number 1 in the Official Jazz and Blues Albums Chart and number 2 in the Official Americana Albums Chart. It peaked at number four in the UK Independent Albums Chart, having been number one on the UK Independent Album Breakers Chart. In January 2023, The Official Charts Company announced that Shining in the Half Light had reached number 39 out of the top 40 best selling albums in the Official Americana Albums Chart in 2022.

At the 2023 UK Blues Awards, Bailey was given three accolades for 'Artist of the Year', 'Vocalist of the Year', and 'Album of the Year'. Her third such triumph as 'Artist of the Year' (2020, 2021, and 2023), means that she is not eligible to win that award again, but instead was inducted into the UK Blues Hall of Fame.

Bailey has won a number of awards within the UK Americana scene including in 2022 'Live Artist of the Year' and also 'Artist of the Year'. In 2023 she was awarded with 'Live Artist of the Year' and appeared on stage performing at the UK Americana Music Honors & Awards.

Her live album, Live at the Fire Station, was released on 15 March 2024. Beneath the Neon Glow peaked in the UK Albums Chart at number 12.

== Touring ==
In 2022, Bailey was confirmed as the support act for the 50th Anniversary American Pie Tour by Don McLean in September and October that year. This was preceded in August by her appearance on Joe Bonamassa's Keeping the Blues Alive at Sea Cruise.

She has previously provided guest support on tours by Jools Holland, Van Morrison, Walter Trout, Kitty, Daisy & Lewis, Mike Farris, the Kris Barras Band and King King. Bailey also performed at the 2021 Cheltenham Music Festival.

In June 2025, Bailey supported Rag'n'Bone Man on selected dates of his UK tour, including an appearance at Llangollen Pavilion on 27 June 2025, where they performed together on stage on the song "Anywhere Away from Here". Bailey sang the vocal part originally recorded by Pink on Rag'n'Bone Man's album, Life by Misadventure.

On 29 June 2024, Bailey performed on the Avalon Stage at the Glastonbury Festival.

== Awards and honours ==
Year	Award	Category	Work	Result	Ref.
2020	UK Americana Awards	UK Song of the Year	"Little Piece of Heaven"	Won	
2020	UK Blues Awards	Blues Album of the Year	Road I Call Home	Won	
2020	UK Blues Awards	Blues Artist of the Year	—N/a	Won	
2021	UK Blues Awards	Blues Album of the Year	Ain't Nothing But	Nominated	
2021	UK Blues Awards	Blues Artist of the Year	—N/a	Won	
2023	UK Americana Awards	UK Artist of the Year	—N/a	Won	
2023	UK Americana Awards	UK Live Act of the Year	—N/a	Won	
2023	UK Blues Awards	Blues Artist of the Year	—N/a	Won	
2023	UK Blues Awards	Blues Vocalist of the Year	—N/a	Won	
2023	UK Blues Awards	Blues Album of the Year	—N/a	Won	
2023	UK Blues Hall of Fame	—N/a	—N/a	Inducted	
2024	UK Americana Awards	UK Live Act of the Year	—N/a	Won	
2025	UK Blues Awards	Blues Album of the Year	Beneath the Neon Glow	Won	
2025	UK Blues Awards	Blues Vocalist of the Year	—N/a	Won	
2025	UK Blues Awards	Broadcaster of the Year	—N/a	Won	

== Discography ==
Title	Type	Details	Peak chart positions					
Title	Type	Details	UK	SCO	UK Indie	UK Jazz & Blues	UK Americana	UK Country
Who Am I to Me	EP	Released: 2015	—	—	—	—	—	—
The Elberton Sessions	EP	Released: 2016	—	—	—	—	—	—
Wildfire	Studio album	Released: 2017; Label: Outlaw Music	—	—	—	—	—	—
Road I Call Home	Studio album	Released: 2019; Label: Outlaw Music	—	—	—	—	24	13
Blacktop Companion	Companion album	Released: 2019; Label: Outlaw Music; Format: CD	—	—	—	—	—	—
Ain't Nothing But	Live album	Released: 2020; Label: Outlaw Music	—	—	—	—	—	—
Shining in the Half Light	Studio album	Released: 25 February 2022; Label: Outlaw Music	42	16	4	1	2	—
The Night Owl & the Lark	EP	Released: 2023; Label: Outlaw Music	—	—	32	4	12	—
Live at the Fire Station	Live album	Released: 15 March 2024; Label: Outlaw Music	—	15	5	1	4	—
Beneath the Neon Glow	Studio album	Released: 9 August 2024; Label: Cooking Vinyl	12	4	3	1	2	—
Beneath the Neon Glow – Reimagined	Reimagined album	Released: 2025	—	40	15	1	10	—
Can't Take My Story Away	Studio album	Released: 16 January 2026; Label: Cooking Vinyl, Outlaw Music	14	6	2	1	2	—
"—" denotes a recording that did not chart or was not released in that territory.
