= Microtonic =

Studio album by Bdrmm
- Released: 28 February 2025
- Genre: Electronic
- Length: 44:40
- Label: Rock Action
- Producer: Alex Greaves

Bdrmm chronology
I Don't Know (2023)	Microtonic (2025)

Microtonic is the third studio album by British band Bdrmm, released on 28 February 2025 through Rock Action Records. Like its predecessor I Don't Know it was produced by Alex Greaves and received positive reviews from critics.

In it the band departed from their previous shoegaze sound to focus more on electronic music.

Professional ratings
Review scores
Source	Rating
Clash	8/10
The Guardian	3/5 stars
The Line of Best Fit	7/10
NME	5/5 stars

== Track listing ==
Microtonic track listing
No.	Title	Length
1.	"goit (featuring Working Men's Club)"	2:41
2.	"John on the Ceiling"	3:38
3.	"Infinity Peaking"	5:41
4.	"Snares"	4:41
5.	"In the Electric Field (featuring Olivesque)"	5:42
6.	"Microtonic"	3:50
7.	"Clarkycat"	5:41
8.	"Sat in the Heat"	4:22
9.	"Lake Disappointment"	3:29
10.	"The Noose"	5:36
Total length:		44:40
