= Welcome Break (album) =

Studio album by Pip Blom
- Released: 12 November 2021
- Studio: Big Jelly Studios
- Length: 39:24
- Label: Heavenly

Pip Blom chronology
Boat (2019)	Welcome Break (2021)	Bobbie (2023)

Singles from Welcome Break
- 1. "Keep it Together" Released: 15 June 2021; 2. "It Should Have Been Fun" Released: 15 July 2021; 3. "You Don't Want This" Released: 17 August 2021; 4. "I Know I'm Not Easy to Like" Released: 9 November 2021

Welcome Break is the second studio album by Dutch indie band Pip Blom. It was released on 12 November 2021 by Heavenly Recordings.

== Production ==
The album was self-produced by the band at Big Jelly Studios in Ramsgate, England.

== Release ==
On 15 June 2021, Pip Blom announced the release of their second studio, originally scheduled for release on 8 October 2021. However, due to the COVID-19 pandemic, the album release was moved to 12 November 2021.

=== Singles ===
The first single "Keep It Together" was released on 15 June 2021, the same day as the album announcement. "It Should Have Been Fun", the second single from Pip Blom, was released on 15 July 2021.

On 17 August 2021, the third single "You Don't Want This" was released. The music video was directed by Sara Elzinga.

The band's fourth single "I Know I'm Not Easy to Like" was released on 9 November 2021, and lead singer Pip Blom said:

"This song feels angry, even aggressive maybe. We had so much fun recording this one. We really had to give our everything to make it as energetic as possible. We used different set-ups for the drums to be able to make it go from really small to really big in one track. It’s all about the dynamics in this one, what we’re playing is not changing that much, but we really tried to capture different sounds to keep it interesting and exciting. I’m not sure the chorus could be bigger than this one haha."

== Tour ==
In support of the album, Pip Blom announced a tour of America, starting on 21 March 2022 at Mercury Lounge in New York, and finishing at The Pie Shop in Washington, D.C., on 1 April 2022.

== Critical reception ==
Professional ratings
Aggregate scores
Source	Rating
AnyDecentMusic?	7.2/10
Metacritic	78/100
Review scores
Source	Rating
DIY	4/5 stars
Gigwise	8/10
Mojo	4/5 stars
NME	4/5 stars
Spectrum Culture	78%
Uncut	8/10
Under the Radar	7.5/10

Welcome Break was met with "generally favorable" reviews from critics. At Metacritic, which assigns a weighted average rating out of 100 to reviews from mainstream publications, this release received an average score of 78 based on eight reviews. Aggregate website AnyDecentMusic? gave the release a 7.2 out of 10 based on a critical consensus of 11 reviews.

Writing for NME, reviewer Rhys Buchanan said: "Welcome Break thrives off its simplicity and sense of joyful abandon. It's a record that will become like a familiar friend over repeated listens, and shows how the band have built elegantly on the foundations of their debut, fizzing with self-belief at every turn." Tom Dibb of Gigwise wrote: "Welcome Break isn't just chock full of hard-rocking guitars or breezy summertime bangers. It wears its sensitivities and tenderness on its sleeve. Pip Blom have exceeded the highs of even their debut LP. A record of two halves—breezy pop and introspective guitar rock—it shows a growth within the band. At DIY, Ims Taylor said of the release: "The record situates itself gorgeously in the easy-going transience suggested by its service-station-inspired title: Pip Blom follow their sunny guitars and breezy lyricism wherever they may lead, and it's all about the journey rather than the destination."

=== Accolades ===
Publications' year-end list appearances for Welcome Break
Critic/Publication	List	Rank	Ref
God Is in the TV	God Is in the TV's Top 100 Albums of 2021	56	
Rough Trade	Rough Trade's Top 100 Albums of 2021	28	
Under the Radar	Under the Radar's Top 100 Albums of 2021	69	

== Track listing ==
Welcome Break track listing
No.	Title	Length
1.	"You Don't Want This"	3:28
2.	"12"	3:10
3.	"It Should Have Been Fun"	3:42
4.	"Keep It Together"	3:16
5.	"Different Tune"	3:39
6.	"I Know I'm Not Easy to Like"	3:34
7.	"Faces"	4:21
8.	"I Love the City"	3:44
9.	"Easy"	3:07
10.	"Holiday"	3:29
11.	"Trouble in Paradise"	3:54
