= Tom Speight =

British singer-songwriter

- Born: 1986/87 (age 38–39)
- Genres: Alternative, pop
- Occupation: Singer
- Years active: 2012–present
- Website: www.tomspeightmusic.com

Tom Speight (born 1986/87) is a British singer-songwriter. He is best known for his albums Everything's Waiting For You and Love & Light, both of which reached the Top 75 of the UK Albums Chart.

== Early life ==
Speight graduated from the Liverpool Institute for Performing Arts.

== Career ==
Speight initially found fame working with artists such as Mumford & Sons and Travis, and was recording music at Universal. However, he was forced to take a two-year break from recording due to contracting septicaemia, requiring him to undergo surgery and rehabilitation.

Following his return to music in 2016, Speight toured around the UK as well as touring with Seafret in Europe. He also worked as a songwriter on an album by Turin Brakes. By 2018, following the release of a string of EPs, Speight had reached a total of 60 million streams on Spotify. He released his debut album, Collide, in 2019. The album peaked at number 11 on the UK Independent Albums Chart and topped the UK Independent Album Breakers Chart.

Speight's second album, Everything's Waiting For You, was released in September 2021. The album was co-produced by Rich Turvey, and themed on his gratitude for his life and job following periods in hospital. The album was his second to top the UK Independent Album Breakers Chart, and peaked at number 41 on the UK Albums Chart.

Speight released his third album, Love & Light, in August 2023. The album focussed on Speight's personal experiences and on living life to the fullest, and was preceded by two singles, 'The One' and 'Let Go'. The album entered the UK Albums Chart at number 66.

Speight released his fourth album, Perfect Strangers, in September 2025.

== Personal life ==
Speight has Crohn's disease and lives with a stoma. He is an ambassador of Crohn's and Colitis UK.

In August 2025, during an interview on BBC Radio 2 with OJ Borg, Speight spoke about the writing process following the end of a five-year relationship.

== Discography ==
=== Albums ===
Title	Year	Peak chart positions
Title	Year	UK
Collide	2019	—
Everything's Waiting for You	2021	41
Love & Light	2023	66

=== EPs ===
Title	Year
Little Love	2016
Falling	2016
Love	2016
Willow Tree	2017
My My My	2017
Waiting	2017
Live at Studio 3	2018
Sunset Sound	2020
You & I	2022
Stay Alive	2024

=== Singles ===
Title	Year	Album
"I Wanna Dance with Somebody (Who Loves Me)"	2018	Non-album singles
"In the Air Tonight" (with Mahogany)	2018	Non-album singles
"Want You"	2018	Collide
"Collide"	2018	Collide
"Strangers Now" (with Lydia Clowes)	2018	Collide
"My Name"	2019	Collide
"Heartshaker"	2019	Collide
"Into the Night"	2019	Collide
"Little Love"	2019	Collide
"Christmas Morning"	2019	Non-album singles
"Save Tonight" (with Lydia Clowes)	2020	Non-album singles
"Good Times"	2020	Sunset Sound
"Live Forever"	2020	Non-album single
"Natalie Portman"	2020	Sunset Sound
"Dakota"	2020	Everything's Waiting for You
"Driving Home for Christmas"	2021	Non-album singles
"Torn" (with Lydia Clowes)	2022	Non-album singles
"Worry" (with Roses & Revolutions)	2022	Brightside of Me
"You & I"	2022	You & I
"Roll the Dice Again"	2022	You & I
"Just as You Are"	2022	You & I
"Rockin' Around the Christmas Tree"	2022	Non-album single
"The One"	2023	The One
"If This Is How the Story Ends"	2023	Love & Light
"Let Go"	2023	Love & Light
"Tomorrow"	2023	Love & Light
"Aftermath" (with Lydia Clowes)	2023	Love & Light
"Trick of the Light"	2023	Love & Light
"Wonderful Wonder" (solo or with Ward Thomas)	2023	Love & Light
"The Christmas You Deserve"	2023	Non-album single
"Stay Alive"	2024	Stay Alive
"Kind to You" (with The Mayries)	2024	Stay Alive
