= The Eye of Shinjuku =

Sculpture in Tokyo, Japan

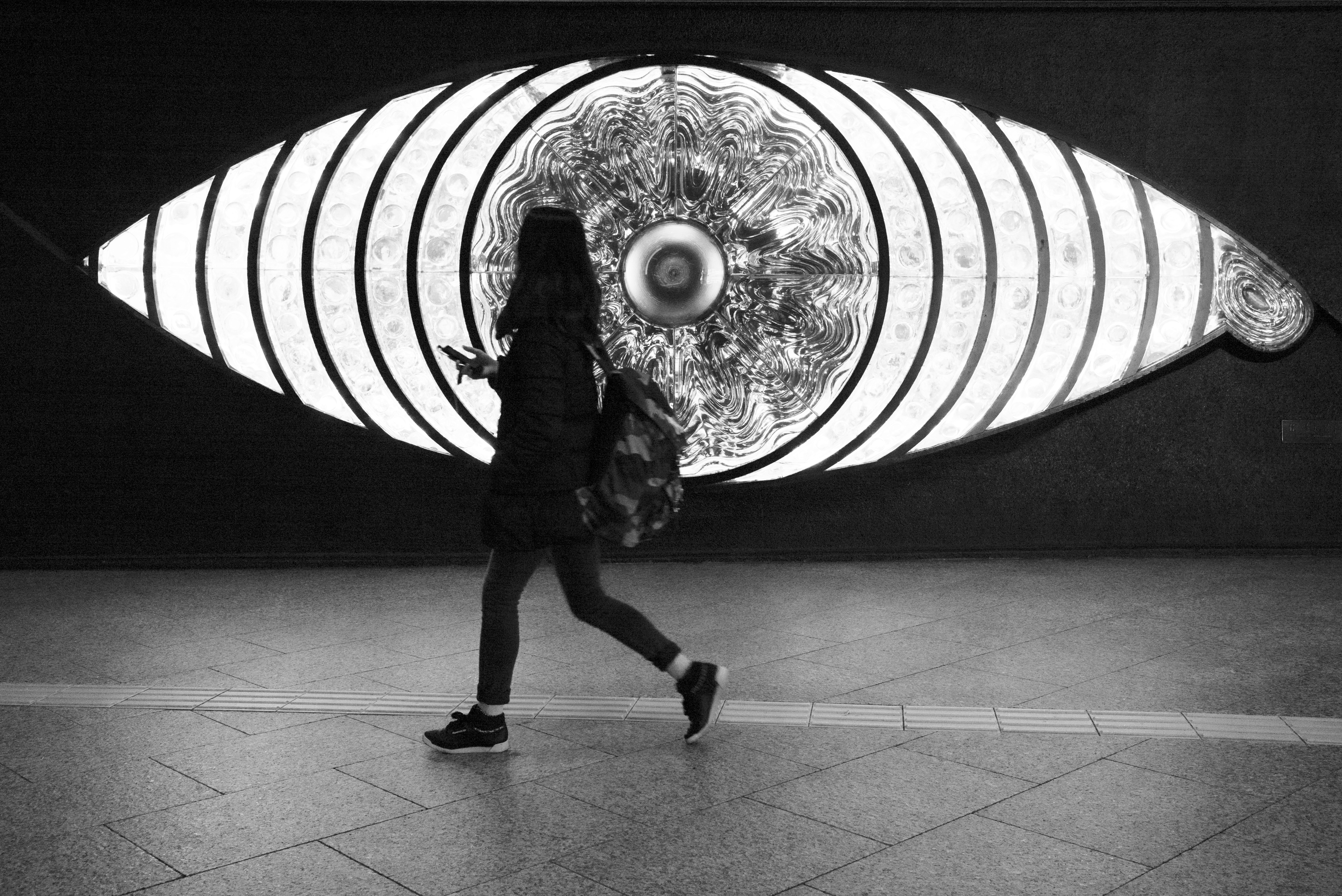
- Artist: Yoshiko Miyashita
- Year: 1969
- Location: Tokyo, Japan

The Eye of Shinjuku is a sculpture by Yoshiko Miyashita, installed in Shinjuku Station west gate underground square, in Tokyo, Japan. The 1969 sculpture is below the Subaru Building, and has been described as "the most eye-catching piece of public art in town".
