= I Don't Know (album) =

Studio album by Bdrmm
- Released: 30 June 2023
- Genre: Shoegaze
- Length: 41:06
- Label: Rock Action
- Producer: Alex Greaves

Bdrmm chronology
Bedroom (2020)	I Don't Know (2023)	Microtonic (2025)

I Don't Know is the second studio album by British shoegaze band Bdrmm, released on 30 June 2023 through Rock Action Records. It was produced by Alex Greaves and received positive reviews from critics.

== Critical reception ==
Professional ratings
Aggregate scores
Source	Rating
Metacritic	83/100
Review scores
Source	Rating
AllMusic	3.5/5 stars
Clash	8/10
The Line of Best Fit	9/10
NME	4/5 stars
The Skinny	4/5 stars

I Don't Know received a score of 82 out of 100 on review aggregator Metacritic based on eight critics' reviews, indicating "universal acclaim". Uncut felt that the band "have expanded their sound, retaining that youthful energy and combining it with ambition and impressive marshalling of dynamics that creates a strangely serene album", while Mojo remarked that Bdrmm's "murky spider play tugs at the listener's emotions in unanticipated ways". The Quietus's Zara Hedderman found that it "builds and expands on the successes of its predecessor", from which it "retains a similar wash of reverb-drenched guitars and vocals".

Robin Murray of Clash described the album as "a thrilling return" as well as "an about-turn of sorts, swapping the directness of their debut for an endearing brand of eclectic minimalism". NME's Thomas smith stated that "where their debut was dark and informed by the early-20s malaise (no wonder it chimed well in COVID's lost years), I Don't Know shows glimmers of hope." He concluded, "This is a special record by a band who are not-so-quietly raising the bar for the whole British scene". The Skinny's Jo Higgs opined that Bdrmm "have a solid formula: radio-rock with more substance, nuance and historical awareness than most of their contemporaries".

Paul Simpson of AllMusic wrote that I Don't Know contains an "expanded pool of influences, which still include all manner of dreamy, hypnotic rock music, as well as ambient, dance, and classical, incorporating a greater presence of synths and atmospheric textures", also calling the band "consistently inventive, the production is generally fantastic, and the album has several strong moments". Craig Howieson, reviewing the album for The Line of Best Fit, felt that "the longing shoegaze of their earlier work still persists, but it is no longer tempered by a longing to escape, it is emboldened by a knowledge of the beauty that lies beyond" and that Bdrmm "have created an enigma for you to unravel. One of dark beauty and twisting longing."

== Track listing ==
I Don't Know track listing
No.	Title	Length
1.	"Alps"	5:30
2.	"Be Careful"	4:30
3.	"It's Just a Bit of Blood"	4:46
4.	"We Fall Apart"	5:26
5.	"Advertisement One"	4:14
6.	"Hidden Cinema"	4:20
7.	"Pulling Stitches"	4:12
8.	"A Final Movement"	8:08
Total length:		41:06

== Charts ==
Chart performance for I Don't Know
Chart (2023)	Peak position
Scottish Albums (OCC)	5
UK Albums (OCC)	51
UK Independent Albums (OCC)	4
