= Coach Party =

British indie rock band

- Origin: Isle of Wight
- Genre: Indie rock
- Years active: 2019–present
- Members: Jess Eastwood; Joe Perry; Steph Norris; Guy Page
- Website: coach-party.com

Coach Party is a British four-piece indie rock band formed on the Isle of Wight, England in 2019. The band is composed of lead singer and bassist Jess Eastwood, guitarists Joe Perry and Steph Norris, and drummer Guy Page.

== History ==
=== Pre-Coach Party ===
Before forming Coach Party, the band performed under the name Jeph and released three songs: "Hey Baby" (2018), "Harry" (2018), and "Lola" (2019).

=== Coach Party (2019–present) ===
Chess Club Records signed the newly named Coach Party in 2019, and the band re-released their previous single "Lola" as "Oh Lola" in November 2019.

In early 2020, the band began releasing singles leading up to the eventual release of their debut EP Party Food, released in June of that year on Chess Club Records. The Guardian Damien Morris reviewed the album and called the band "poppy, witty and experimental," further saying they "are far more interesting than a cursory listen suggests". Morris explained, "Plenty of new indie bands become less interesting the more you hear them, but Coach Party, like the Isle of Wight, are more intriguing than they first appear." NME highlighted how the band tackles difficult subjects, such "as self-hatred, tricky relationships and confronting one’s own inner demons in their lyrics," which NME claims, "when paired with their joyous, pint-spilling brand of indie rock, it’s a combination that so often works wonders".

In September 2025, Coach Party released their second studio album, Caramel. The band performed in record shops across the UK, including a homecoming performance at Triple A Records in Newport on the Isle of Wight.

In January 2026, Coach Party were announced as one of ferry company Red Funnel's sponsors. Later the same month, they headlined an concert at Strings Bar and Venue on the Isle of Wight. Before their performance, BBC Radio 6 Music hosts Steve Lamacq and Huw Stephens had broadcast live from the venue and interviewed members of the band.

== Band members ==
- Jess Eastwood – lead vocals, bass guitar
- Joe Perry – guitar
- Steph Norris – guitar
- Guy Page – drums

== Discography ==
=== Studio albums ===
List of studio albums, with selected details
Title	Album details
Killjoy	Released: 8 September 2023; Label: Chess Club; Formats: CD, digital download, LP, streaming
Caramel	Released: 26 September 2025; Label: Chess Club; Formats: CD, Cassette, digital download, LP, streaming

=== EPs ===
List of EPs, with selected details
Title	EP details
Party Food	Released: 10 June 2020; Label: Chess Club; Formats: 10" vinyl, digital download, streaming
After Party	Released: 13 April 2021; Label: Chess Club; Formats: 10" vinyl, digital download, streaming
Nothing Is Real	Released: 29 April 2022; Label: Chess Club; Formats: 10" vinyl, CD, digital download, streaming

=== Singles ===
- "Oh Lola" (2019)
- "Breakdown" (2020)
- "Space" (2020)
- "Bags" (2020)
- "Can't Talk, Won't" (2020)
- "Really OK on My Own" (2020)
- "Wonderful Christmastime" (2020)
- "Everybody Hates Me" (2021)
- "FLAG (Feel Like a Girl)" (2021)
- "Weird Me Out" (2022)
- "Micro Aggression" (2023)
- "All I Wanna Do Is Hate" (2023)
- "Born Leader" (2023)
- "What's the Point in Life" (2023)
- "Parasite" (2023)
- "Girls!" (2025)
- "Do Yourself A Favor" (2025)
- "Do It For Love" (2025)
- "Disco Dream" (2025)
- "Nurse Depression" (2026)

== Music videos ==
Title	Release Date	Credits
"Oh, Lola"	27 November 2019	Director: Daniel Broadley; DOP: Jamie Harding; Camera Assistant: Cam Reed; Gaffer: Bertil Mulvad; Make-Up Artist: Danekah Grace; Colourist: Dan Moran
"Breakdown"	19 February 2020	Director: Daniel Broadley; DOP: Jamie Harding; Loader: Bethany Fitter; Art Director: Phoebe Tonkin; Make Up Artist: Naomi Lake; Colourist: Dan Moran
"Space"	21 April 2020	Video Created/Animated/Directed by Cameron Guy
"Bleach"	10 June 2020	Director: Coach Party; Editor: Dan Broadley
"Bags"	5 August 2020	
"Can't Talk, Won't"	29 September 2020	Director: Daniel Broadley; DOP: Jack Lilley; 1st AC: Jack Haytor; 2nd AC: Sam Oxton; Spark: Michael Sides; Production Assistant: Simon Chmiewliski; Production Assistant: Patrick Bethell; Car Hire: Joe Trott; Make-Up Artist: Naomi Lake
"Wonderful Christmastime"	8 December 2020	
"Everybody Hates Me"	23 February 2021	Director: Daniel Broadley; DOP/Gaffer: Jack Lilley; Make-Up Artist: Naomi Lake; Camera Assistant: Serg Bozoks; Production Assistant: Rebecca Mundy
"I'm Sad"	13 April 2021	Produced and directed by Shitty Little Films; Edited by Martyna Wisniewska
"FLAG (Feel Like a Girl)"	27 September 2021	Director - Daniel Broadley; Gaffer - Jack Lilley; Production Assistant - Christian Hosie; Production Assistant - Tori Caldeira; Costume - Tasha Middleton; MUA - Katie Pearce; Colourist - Dan Moran; Set Stills - Martyna Wisniewska
"Weird Me Out"	1 March 2022	Directed & Shot: Daniel Broadley; Gaffer: Jack Lilley; Spark: Michael Sides; 1st AC: Carlo Quicho; Art Dept: Tori Caldeira; Art Dept: Josh Bannister; Stylist: Jade Hennessey; Make-Up Artist: Katie Pearce; Photography: Martyna Wisniewska; Colourist: Dan Moran
"Shit TV"	3 May 2022	Edited by Martyna ‘gingerdope’ Wisniewska
"Micro Aggression"	8 February 2023	Directed by Daniel Broadley & Martyna Bannister; DOP: Dan Broadley; Executive Producer: Nathan Killham; Gaffer: Jack Lilley; Art Department: Tori Caldeira and Josh Bannister; 1st AD: Matthew Sterling; 1st AC: Cami Carlow; Spark: Josh Stone; Spark: Tom Martin; Stylist: Jade Hennessey; MUA: Katie Pearce; Movement Direction: Martyna Bannister; BTS: Manoel Akure; Colourist: Hannah Squires; Editing: Dan Broadley; Production Company: Kode Media; Kit Hire: Cine West
"All I Wanna Do Is Hate"	2 May 2023	Directed by Daniel Broadley
"Born Leader"	15 June 2023	Lyric video created by Cameron JL West; Skeleton animations credit: GreenScreen Brasil
"What's the Point in Life"	11 June 2023	Directed by Becky Garner & Oska Zaky
"Parasite"	8 August 2023	Directed & edited by Paul Johnson
