= Killjoy (Coach Party album) =

Studio album by Coach Party
- Released: 8 September 2023
- Studio: Mustard (Isle of Wight)
- Length: 27:32
- Label: Chess Club
- Producer: Guy Page

Coach Party chronology
| Nothing Is Real (2022) | Killjoy (2023) |

Killjoy is the debut album by British indie rock group Coach Party, released on 8 September 2023 through Chess Club Records. It was produced by the group's drummer Guy Page.

== Critical reception ==
Professional ratings
Aggregate scores
| Source | Rating |
|---|---|
| Metacritic | 78/100 |
Review scores
| Source | Rating |
| Clash | 7/10 |
| The Line of Best Fit | 7/10 |
| NME | 4/5 stars |
| Under the Radar | 8/10 stars |

Killjoy received a score of 78 out of 100 on review aggregator Metacritic based on four critics' reviews, indicating "generally favorable" reception. Joshua Mills of The Line of Best Fit called it "a fully formed, impactful album" with "pristine" production that "swaps the insular indie" of the band's first three EPs "for a glossy, layered effort". Under the Radar's Andy von Pip found it to be "filled with relatable lyrics" and that the band "have cranked up the noise and distortion, and the results have paid dividends". Reviewing the album for NME, Andy Brown opined that Killjoy is "often catchy and always from the heart" as well as "a deeply human debut", writing that the band's "polished sound benefits massively from the odd punk outburst". James Mellen of Clash described it as "a wickedly nihilistic manifesto of stadium proportions" with "huge soaring riffs, heavy breakdowns and plenty of earworm choruses".

== Track listing ==
All tracks are written by Coach Party.

Killjoy – Standard edition
| No. | Title | Length |
|---|---|---|
| 1. | "What's the Point in Life" | 2:18 |
| 2. | "Parasite" | 1:37 |
| 3. | "Born Leader" | 3:43 |
| 4. | "Micro Aggression" | 2:37 |
| 5. | "July" | 2:23 |
| 6. | "Be That Girl" | 2:56 |
| 7. | "All I Wanna Do Is Hate" | 2:45 |
| 8. | "Hi Baby" | 2:34 |
| 9. | "All of My Friends" | 3:40 |
| 10. | "Always Been You" | 2:59 |
| Total length: | | 27:32 |

Killjoy – Deluxe edition
| No. | Title | Length |
|---|---|---|
| 11. | "Parasite" (Live at Scala) | 2:21 |
| 12. | "Be That Girl" (alt version) | 3:05 |
| 13. | "Born Leader" (alt version) | 4:15 |
| 14. | "What's the Point in Life" (alt version) | 2:57 |
| 15. | "Another Life" (demo) | 3:20 |
| Total length: | | 43:30 |

== Personnel ==
Credits adapted from the album's liner notes.

=== Coach Party ===
- Jessica Eastwood – performance
- Stephanie Norris – performance
- Guy Page – performance, production
- Joe Perry – performance

=== Additional contributors ===
- Claudius Mittendorfer – mixing
- John Webber – mastering
- Megan Doherty – photography
- Cameron JL West – design

== Charts ==
Chart performance for Killjoy
| Chart (2023) | Peak position |
|---|---|
| Scottish Albums (OCC) | 12 |
| UK Albums (OCC) | 71 |
| UK Independent Albums (OCC) | 6 |
