= Bdrmm =

British shoegaze band

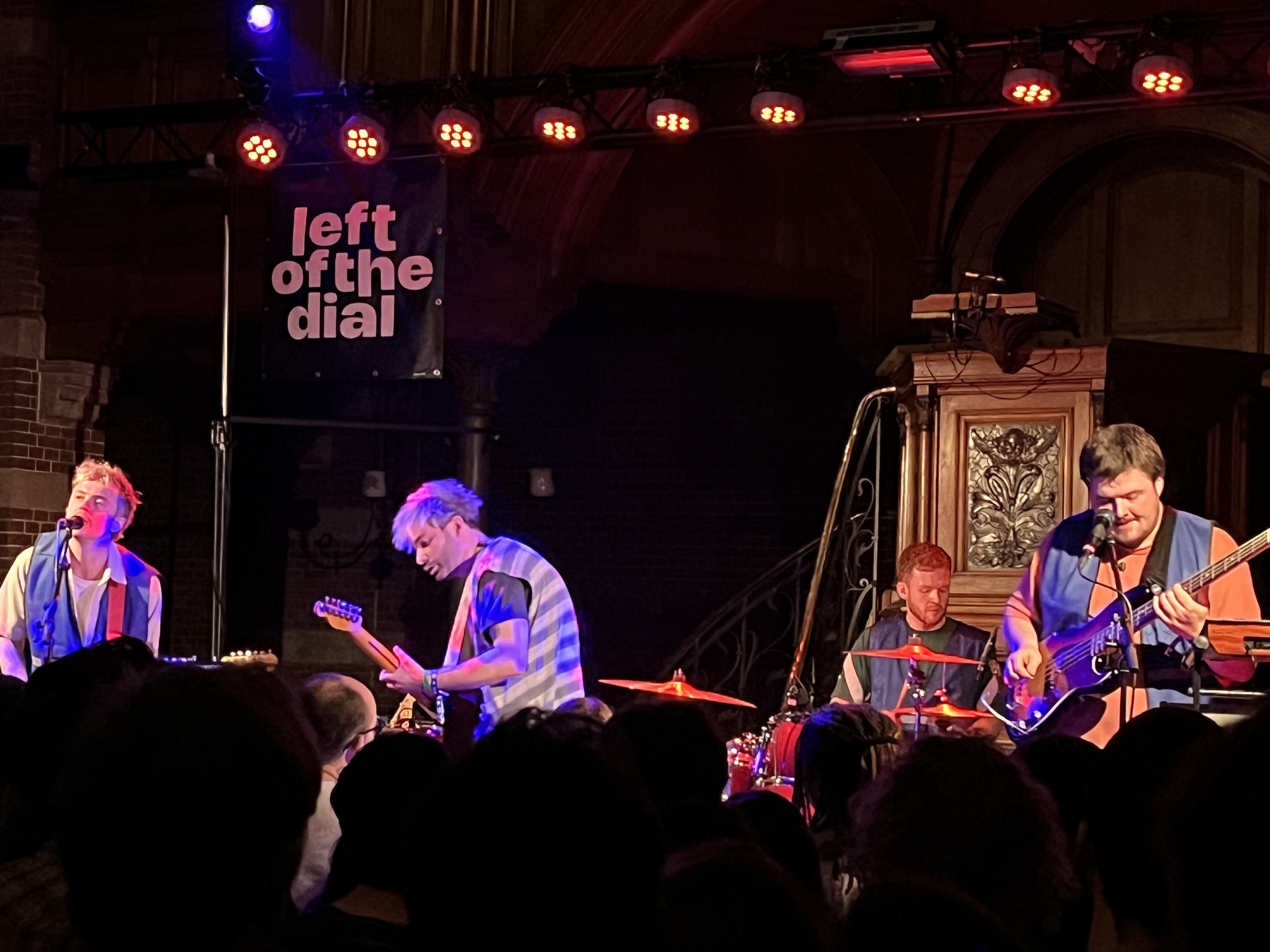
- Bdrmm live at Left of the Dial Festival, 21 October 2023

Background information
- Origin: Kingston upon Hull, England
- Genres: Shoegaze, Indie rock
- Years active: 2016–present
- Labels: Rock Action; Sonic Cathedral
- Members: Ryan Smith; Jordan Smith; Joe Vickers
- Past members: Danny Hull; Luke Irvin; Conor Murray
- Website: bdrmm.co.uk

Bdrmm (stylised as bdrmm) are a British shoegaze band. The group currently consists of four members, Ryan Smith (vocals, guitar, synthesizer), Jordan Smith (vocals, bass, synthesizer), Joe Vickers (guitar, bass) and Conor Murray (drums). The group has so far released three studio albums, Bedroom (2020), I Don't Know (2023) and Microtonic (2025).

The project Bdrmm originally started out as a bedroom project, hence the name, by lead vocalist Ryan Smith. After having an early demo get picked up by BBC Radio 1, He later enlisted his brother Jordan Smith (bass and backing vocals) as well as friends, Joe Vickers (guitar), Danny Hull (synth and backing vocals) and Luke Irvin (drums). After touring relentlessly, and releasing two self-recorded demo EPs as well as a handful of singles produced for the first time by longtime collaborator Alex Greaves, the band was signed to Sonic Cathedral in 2019. Their official debut EP If Not, When? was released later that year. 2020 saw the release of their debut studio album Bedroom.

In 2023, the band signed with Mogwai's Rock Action Records and subsequently released their second studio album I Don't Know. Influences for this project were drawn from a wider range of sounds, including ambient, trip hop, slowcore, and jazz.

On 28 February 2025 they released their third album Microtonic, which featured more of a focus on electronic music, to positive acclaim.

In addition to the band's album releases, bdrmm have created a number of remixes for the likes of Daniel Avery, A Place To Bury Strangers, Strange Pink and Andy Bell.

== Discography ==
=== Studio albums ===
List of studio albums, with selected details and chart positions
Title	Details	Peak chart positions			
Title	Details	UK	UK Down.	UK Ind.	SCO
Bedroom	Released: 3 July 2020; Label: Sonic Cathedral; Formats: Digital download, streaming	—	49	11	58
I Don't Know	Released: 30 June 2023; Label: Rock Action; Formats: Digital download, streaming	51	13	4	5
Microtonic	Released: 28 February 2025; Label: Rock Action; Formats: Digital download, streaming, CD, LP	—	—	—	—

=== Extended plays ===
List of extended plays, with selected details
Title	Details
If Not, When?	Released: 11 October 2019; Label: Sonic Cathedral; Formats: Digital download, streaming, vinyl
The Bedroom Tapes (Live)	Released: 23 October 2020; Label: Sonic Cathedral; Formats: Digital download, streaming, cassette

=== Singles ===
List of singles
Title	Year	Album
"Kare"	2018	Non-album singles
"The Way I Want"	2018	Non-album singles
"C:U"	2018	Non-album singles
"Heaven"	2019	Non-album singles
"Question Mark"	2019	Non-album singles
"Shame"	2019	Non-album singles
"Happy"	2020	Bedroom
"A Reason to Celebrate"	2020	Bedroom
"Gush"	2020	Bedroom
"If...."	2020	Bedroom
"Push / Pull"	2020	Bedroom
"Port"	2021	Non-album singles
"Three"	2022	Non-album singles
"Pretty Things"	2023	Non-album singles
"It's Just a Bit of Blood"	2023	I Don't Know
"Be Careful"	2023	I Don't Know
"Pulling Stitches"	2023	I Don't Know
"John on the Ceiling"	2024	Microtonic
"Infinity Peaking"	2025	Microtonic
"Lake Disappointment"	2025	Microtonic
