= Dea Matrona (band) =

Irish rock band

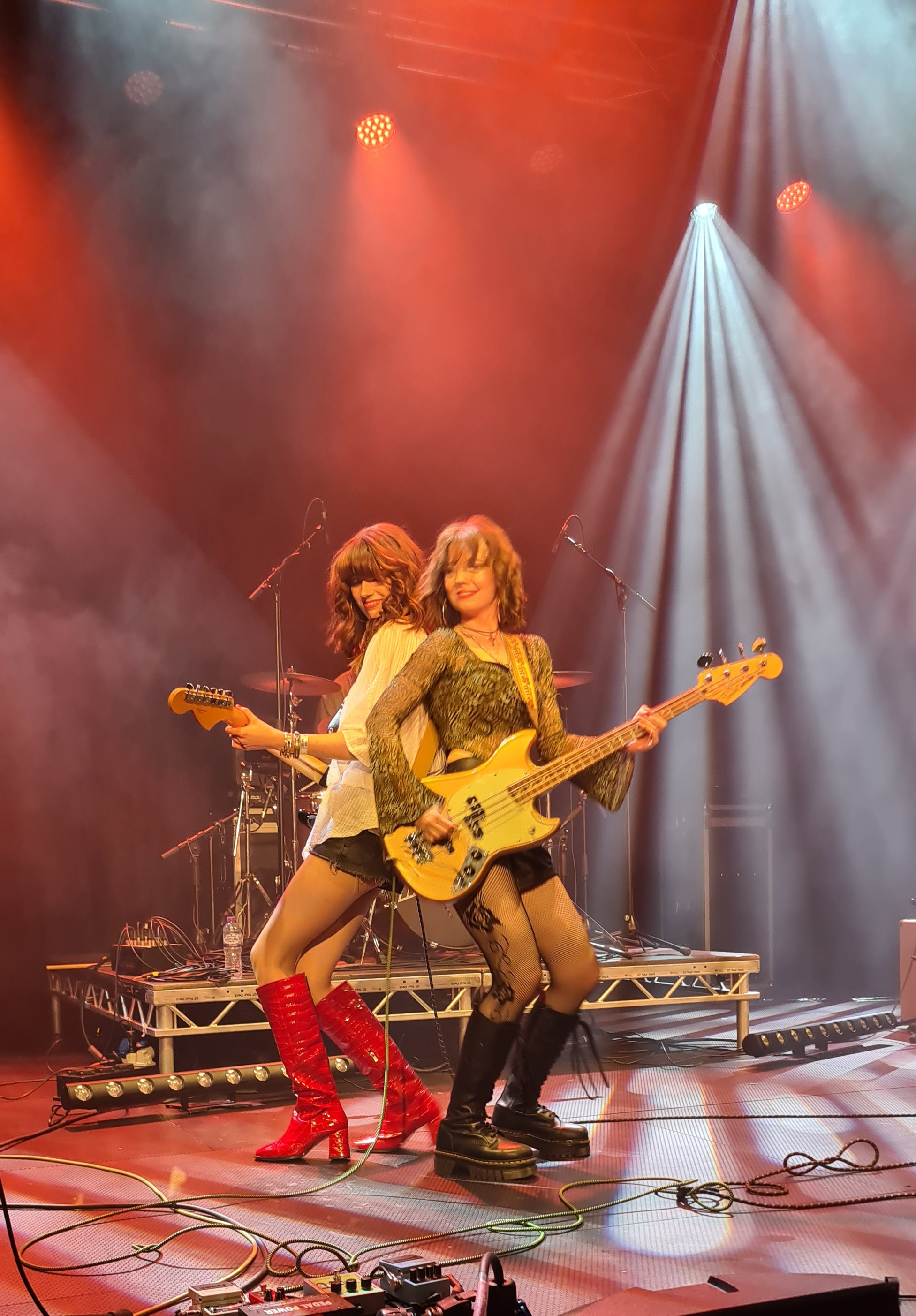
- Dea Matrona Mandela Hall Belfast

Background information
- Origin: Belfast, Northern Ireland
- Genre: Rock
- Years active: 2018–present
- Members: Orláith Forsythe; Mollie McGinn
- Past members: Mamie McGinn
- Website: deamatrona.co.uk

Dea Matrona are an Irish rock band based in Belfast and led by Orláith Forsythe and Mollie McGinn.

Formed in 2018, the band have written and self-produced all of their catalogue to the present day. Both Orláith and Mollie sing and play multiple instruments, exchanging lead singing duties but also swapping their roles on bass and lead guitar.

== Early years ==
The core band members Orláith Forsythe and Mollie McGinn first met in somewhat competitive circumstances, competing against each other in Scór na nÓg singing competitions. "We also went to the same school but didn’t really know each other. In fifth year there was a talent show at school and both of us wanted to enter it individually," Forsythe recalls. "But there was only one more space, so the teacher was like, look, you'll do it together or you don't do it, so we very awkwardly did it together without really knowing each other." They performed Travelin’ Soldier by The Chicks and began practicing together regularly afterwards.

As teenagers, Forsythe and McGinn spent much of their free time busking locally, using public performances as a way to practice and earn small amounts of money. In early 2017, they began performing regularly as a cover band at small pubs, weddings, and local events, often playing multiple sets each week and using the gigs to gain experience and support their musical activities.

"We just went out and played our guitars all day," says McGinn. "We would meet on a weekend, leave the house in the morning and just not come back all day. I think there was one summer, we just busked pretty much every day."

In 2018, Mollie's younger sister Mamie McGinn, 14 at the time, joined the group on drums. The trio continued performing frequently, combining live shows and busking throughout the week to develop their skills and reach audiences.

== Career ==
=== Away from the Tide and viral success ===
The band adopted the name 'Dea Matrona', which originates from Celtic mythology meaning 'Divine Mother Goddess'. In 2019, they released four original songs as the Away from the Tide EP. The band recorded and produced the release independently due to limited financial resources, while maintaining a busy schedule of cover performances and busking alongside their original material.

In December 2020, a video of the band busking Fleetwood Mac's "Oh Well" gained viral attention online. Following this, the band were invited to perform their single "Make You My Star" on The Late Late Show in March 2021, which reached Number 1 on both the UK and Ireland iTunes rock charts. Later in 2021, the band appeared at several festivals including Reading & Leeds, and Belsonic.

=== Line-up change and debut album ===
In February 2022, Dea Matrona announced that Mamie McGinn had left the band to focus on school and other interests. Orláith and Mollie continued performing as a duo, often working with session musicians to maintain their live schedule. Over the next several years, the band toured extensively, building their audience through regional shows and festival appearances including SXSW, Eurosonic Noorderslag, Rock Werchter and Electric Picnic. They also supported established artists such as Kaleo and Chris Shiflett on tour, gaining experience on larger stages.

The band released their debut album, For Your Sins, independently, continuing to self-produce in order to retain control over their music. The album explores themes of love, desire, and religion. In the weeks leading up to its release, the band made a cameo in Season 2 of the television series Blue Lights. Following the album, the band embarked on a promotional tour, with the album reaching number one on the UK Independent Album Breakers chart and entering the top 20 on the Scottish Albums Chart.

Between 2024 and 2025, Dea Matrona continued performing at a mixture of regional and larger-scale events. Highlights included supporting The Corrs at The Royal Albert Hall appearances at Glastonbury Festival and Plymouth Festival and supporting artists such as Sting, Sheryl Crow, Shania Twain, Bryan Adams and The Darkness on European tours.

=== Record deal and second album ===
The second album Hate That I Care was released on 5 June 2026 via AWAL following a deal signed in summer 2025. The title track single was released on 5 March.

Following a tour of the UK supporting the Canadian group The Beaches on 26 February, the band completed their first headline tour of Europe, which was largely sold out. Having supported Sting at an event last year, they again supported Sting on his 3.0 tour in Europe in June and July at 13 gigs. They performed at the Isle of Wight, Y Not and Kendal Calling festivals in 2026.

Headline UK and Eire tour for Hate That I Care in November 2026 followed by a second larger European tour in 2027

== Members ==
- Orláith Forsythe – vocals, lead guitar, bass guitar, mandolin (2017–present)
- Mollie McGinn – vocals, lead guitar, bass guitar, keyboard, drums (2017–present)
- Mamie McGinn – drums (2018–2022)

== Discography ==
=== Albums ===
- For Your Sins (self-released, 3 May 2024)
- Hate That I Care (AWAL, 5 June 2026)

=== EPs ===
- Away from the Tide (self-released, 2019)
- Dea Matrona EP (self-released, 2022)
- For Your Sins: Acoustic Sessions (self released 13 December 2024)

=== Singles ===
- "Hard On Yourself" (2019)
- "Make You My Star" (2020)
- "Stamp On It" (2021)
- "Glory Glory (I Am Free)" (2022)
- "So Damn Dangerous" (2022)
- "Red Button" (2022)
- "Get My Mind Off" (2023)
- "Stuck On You" (2024)
- "Black Rain" (2024)
- "Every Night I Want You" (2024)
- "KISS" (Prince cover) (2024)
- "Stuck on You" (acoustic) (2024)
- "Red Button" (acoustic) (2024)
- "Magic Spell" (2025)
- "Hate That I Care" (2026)
- "John Doe" (2026)
- "My Own Party" (2026)
- "Song From 2009" (2026)

== Appearances and features ==
- UTV Life, UTV (24 May 2019)
- Stephen Nolan Show, BBC One (5 February 2020)
- Hot Press, #MorningGlory25 (3 October 2020)
- The Late Late Show, RTÉ One (12 March 2021)
- Blue Lights series 2, Episode 6:

== Trivia ==
- Jim Fitzpatrick, the Irish artist who did most of the artwork for Thin Lizzy, has also designed one of Dea Matrona's logos.
- The instrument swapping between Orláith and Mollie started in the early busking days due to the heaviness of the bass guitar. The instrument swaps have been remarked on by several other musicians, including Sheryl Crow.
