= New Last Name =

Studio album by Courting
- Released: 26 January 2024
- Genre: Indie rock; indie pop
- Length: 40:40
- Label: PIAS
- Producer: Sean Murphy O'Neill

Courting chronology
Guitar Music (2022)	New Last Name (2024)	Lust for Life (2025)

New Last Name is the second studio album by British band Courting, released on 26 January 2024 through Lower Third and PIAS Recordings. The album was primarily produced by frontman Sean Murphy O'Neill and producer Robert Whiteley, with two tracks co-produced by Cribs members, twin brothers Gary and Ryan Jarman. It received positive reviews from critics.

== Critical reception ==
Professional ratings
Aggregate scores
Source	Rating
Metacritic	71/100
Review scores
Source	Rating
The Line of Best Fit	8/10
NME	3/5 stars
Paste	7.6/10
The Skinny	7.6/10

New Last Name received a score of 71 out of 100 on review aggregator Metacritic based on four critics' reviews, indicating "generally favorable" reception. Kyle Kohner of The Line of Best Fit described the album as "a collection of their most infectious pop songs dusted with their inevitable experimental flair" as well as "an irresistible mess made with exploratory abandon and the demeanour to show off and articulate a thing or two about expectations and pandering". The Skinny's Vicky Greer wrote that the album "forgoes the eccentricities of Guitar Music in favor of music that more closely matches their lofty ambitions—out with sarcastic talk-singing, and in with sugar-sweet choruses".

NME's Sophie Williams found that "the album's overall vibrancy doesn't dim on repeated listens. What's clear is that the playful, 'for the plot' vibe of a band that started on a lark is beginning to transform into something close to remarkable". Andy Steiner of Paste stated that "Courting condenses themselves on New Last Name into smaller, more straightforward indie rock. But the moments when they escape those confines exude with personality and color."

== Track listing ==
All tracks are written by Courting. Additional writing on "We Look Good Together (Big Words)" by DJ Sabrina the Teenage DJ.

New Last Name track listing
No.	Title	Length
1.	"Throw"	4:22
2.	"We Look Good Together (Big Words)"	3:11
3.	"The Hills"	4:55
4.	"Flex"	4:23
5.	"Emily G"	5:47
6.	"Babys"	3:00
7.	"The Wedding"	3:49
8.	"Happy Endings"	4:45
9.	"America"	6:28
Total length:		40:40

== Personnel ==
Courting

- Sean Murphy-O'Neill – vocals, programming, production, creative direction
- Josh Cope – guitars
- Sean Thomas – drums
- Connor McCann – bass guitar

Additional contributors

- Robert Whiteley – co-production, mixing
- Mike Hillier – mastering, engineering
- Gary Jarman – additional production on "Throw" and "The Wedding"
- Ryan Jarman – additional production on "Throw" and "The Wedding"
- Sebastian Westwood – additional engineering on "Flex"
- Kyler Garrison – cover

== Charts ==
Chart performance for New Last Name
Chart (2024)	Peak position
Scottish Albums (OCC)	37
UK Independent Albums (OCC)	9
