= Courting (band) =

English rock band

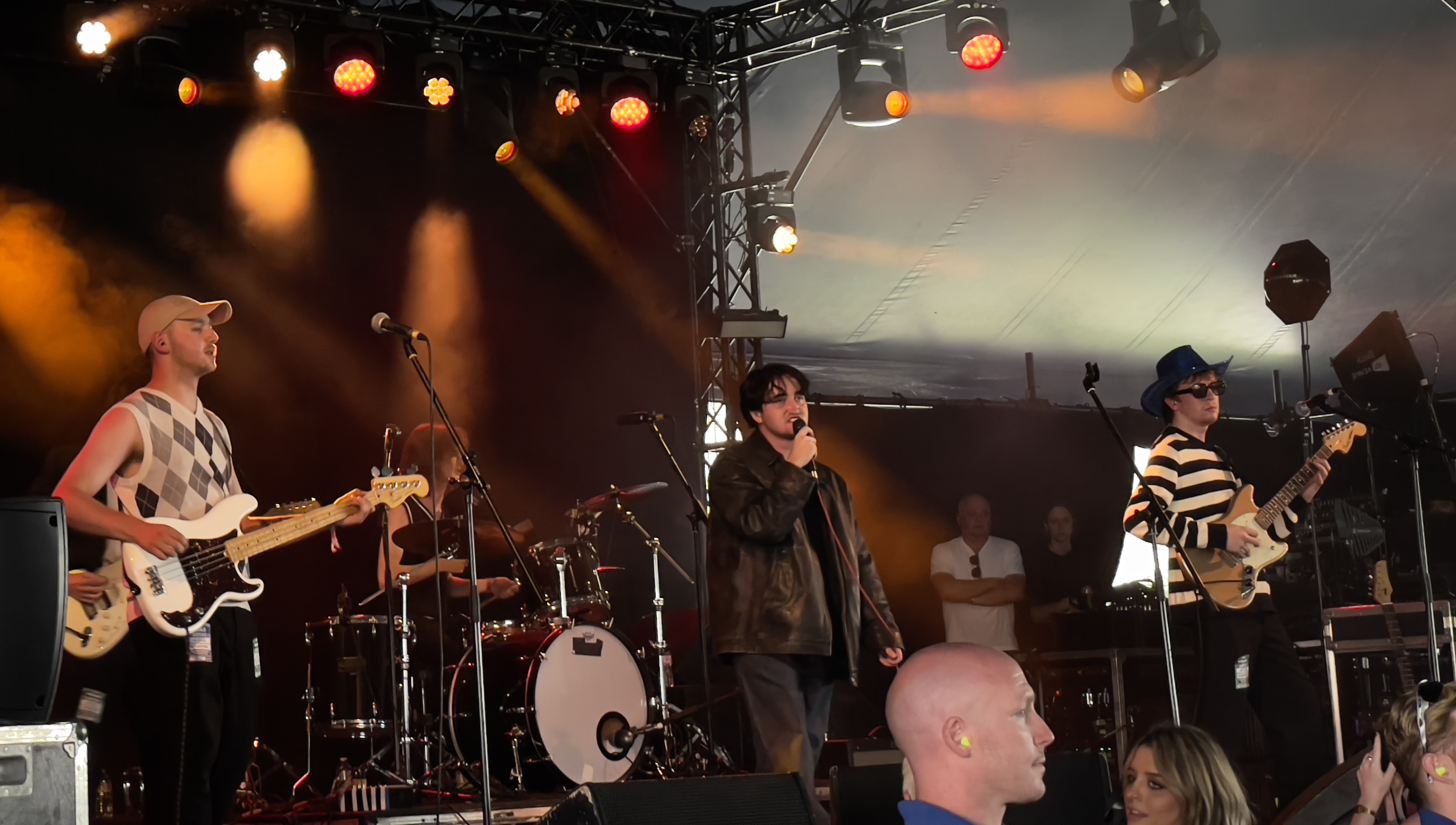
- Courting performing at Reading Festival 2022

Background information
- Origin: Liverpool, England
- Genres: Post-punk; art punk
- Years active: 2018–present
- Labels: PIAS; Nice Swan
- Members: Sean Murphy-O'Neill; Sean Thomas; Joshua Cope; Connor McCann
- Past members: Michael Downes; Sam Brennan
- Website: courtingband.com

Courting are a British electronic rock band based in Liverpool. The group consists of lead vocalist Sean Murphy-O'Neill, drummer Sean Thomas, guitarist Joshua Cope and bassist Connor McCann. Since their formation in 2018, they have released one extended play, Grand National (2021), and three studio albums: Guitar Music in 2022, New Last Name in 2024, and Lust for Life, Or: 'How to Thread the Needle and Come Out the Other Side to Tell the Story' in 2025.

== History ==
=== Formation ===
The band formed in 2018 in Liverpool. Throughout 2019 and 2020, the band released multiple singles including "David Byrne's Badside" and "Football", both of which received a limited run double A-side 7" record via Nice Swan Records. They released their debut extended play, Grand National, in April 2021.

=== Guitar Music ===
On 5 April 2022, Courting released the song "Tennis" as the lead single to their yet-unannounced debut album. The track, described by NME as tongue-in-cheek, was afforded rotation on BBC Radio 1. The second single, "Loaded", was released on 25 May 2022. On 16 August 2022 the band released the third single "Jumper" in promotion of the album. In an interview with DIY, the band described the song as "an outlier on the album". Sean Murphy-O’Neil further said of the album that it "is a gentle story of true unrequited love, meant to playout like a 2006 romcom."

On 23 September 2022 Courting released their debut studio album Guitar Music to critical acclaim. NME described the album as "a raucously fun debut that serves all aces". The albums release was supported by an extensive UK tour.

=== New Last Name ===
Over the course of 2023, Courting played various one off 'roadtesting' shows around the UK and Europe, debuting many new songs live. On 13 February the band played a sold out show titled The Wedding. Two live tracks from this session, versions of "Tennis" and "Jumper", were later released on the group's Bandcamp page, as well as a cover of the Icona Pop and Charli XCX track "I Love It". The band also supported Circa Waves on their 2023 UK tour.

On 7 July 2023 Courting released the song "Flex" as the first single off of their upcoming second studio album, which was reviewed positively by critics. In late 2023, the band started teasing a one-off tie-in project, 'The Throwbecks' as a way of promoting the album. The band performed a single show billed as 'The Throwbecks' on 16 November 2021 at the Kazimer in Liverpool. On 8 November 2023, the second single off the album, "Throw", was premiered on BBC Radio 1, as well as the band's second album New Last Name being announced for a 26 January 2024 release. Despite New Last Name being a studio album, the band stated that it "came together as a play" and while the record is connected by a narrative, it is mainly a collection of the band's "most contained pop songs, and strangest experiments sat side by side".

On 14 December 2023 Courting released "Emily G" as the third single from New Last Name. On 8 January 2024 the album's fourth and final single "We Look Good Together (Big Words)" premiered on BBC Radio 6. On 23 January 2024, Courting did a live session as part of BBC Radio 1's Maida Vale Studios sessions series, including live renditions of "Throw" and "We Look Good Together". The band also teased fans on social media and on the radio that they would also be covering a song by the 1975. Instead, the group played the opening riff to their hit single "It's Not Living (If It's Not with You)" before transitioning into a cover of Olivia Rodrigo's hit single "Bad Idea Right?".

On 26 January 2024, Courting released New Last Name.

=== Lust for Life ===
On 20 November 2024, Courting announced the forthcoming release of their third studio album, Lust for Life, Or: 'How to Thread the Needle and Come Out the Other Side to Tell the Story'. Its lead single, "Pause at You", was issued on the same day. The album was released on 14 March 2025.

== Style and songwriting motifs ==
The band have been described as a clash of post-punk and hyperpop. The band have also been described as indie rock, and art punk.

The band have become known for their frequent references to car parks throughout their songs, as well as having two of the groups biggest tracks ("Football" and "Tennis") referencing sports in their titles. The band have also previously written about fame, British pub culture and falling in love with robot influencers.

== Discography ==
=== Studio albums ===
- Guitar Music (2022) – No. 43 Scottish Albums, No. 21 UK Independent Albums
- New Last Name (2024) – No. 37 Scottish Albums, No. 9 UK Independent Albums
- Lust for Life, Or: 'How to Thread the Needle and Come Out the Other Side to Tell the Story' (2025) – No. 54 Scottish Albums, No. 39 UK Independent Albums

=== Extended plays ===
- Grand National (2021)

=== Singles ===
Title	Year	Album
"Not Yr Man"	2019	Non-album singles
"Football"	2020	Non-album singles
"David Byrne's Badside"	2020	Non-album singles
"Popshop!"	2020	Grand National
"Grand National"	2021	Grand National
"Tennis"	2022	Guitar Music
"Loaded"	2022	Guitar Music
"Jumper"	2022	Guitar Music
"Flex"	2023	New Last Name
"Throw"	2023	New Last Name
"Emily G"	2023	New Last Name
"We Look Good Together (Big Words)"	2024	New Last Name
"Battle"	2024	Non-album single
"Pause at You"	2024	Lust for Life
"After You"	2025	Lust for Life
"Namcy"	2025	Lust for Life
"the twins(1969)"	2025	Lust for Life

=== Other appearances ===
List of other appearances
Title	Year	Album
"Kuon Kuon Kuon"	2020	The Big Plan Compilation
