= Pip Blom =

Dutch indie band

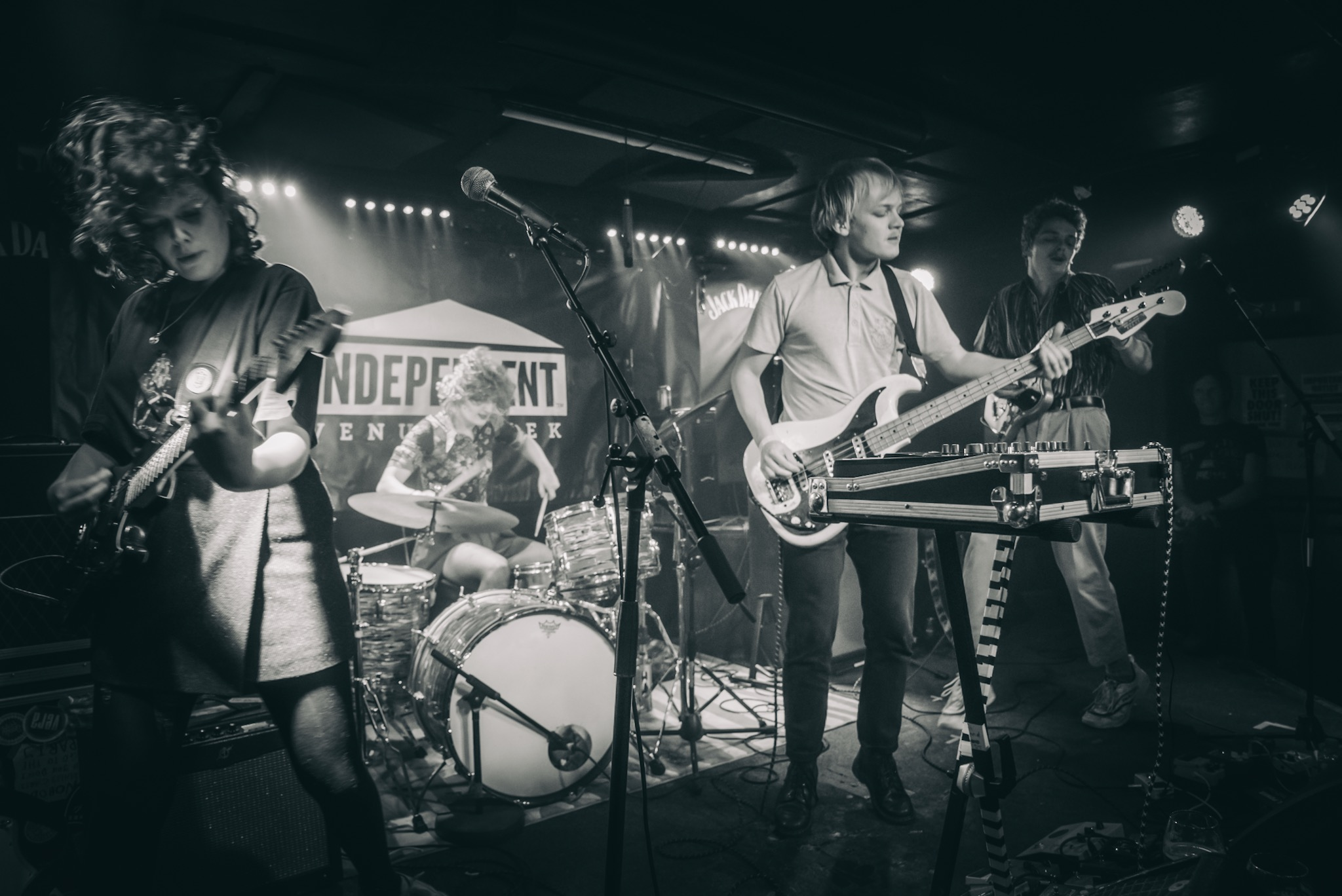
- Pip Blom performing in January 2019

Background information
- Origin: Amsterdam, Netherlands
- Genres: Indie rock, indie pop
- Years active: 2016–present
- Labels: Heavenly, Nice Swan Records
- Members: Pip Blom; Tender Blom; Darek Mercks
- Past members: Gini Cameron; Casper van der Lans; Bowie Thörig; Camiel Muiser; Berend Kok
- Website: pipblom.com

Pip Blom is a Dutch indie band from Amsterdam. The band is named after lead singer Pip Blom. The band has released three full-length albums. Their first album titled Boat was released in 2019. In 2021, Pip Blom released their second full-length album titled Welcome Break. The album received positive reviews. Their third full-length album is titled Bobbie and released on the 20th of October 2023.

== Discography ==
=== Studio albums ===
- Boat (2019)
- Welcome Break (2021)
- Bobbie (2023)

=== Extended plays ===
- Paycheck (2018)
- Grip (2025)
