= Ist Ist =

English post-punk band

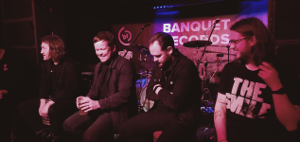
- Ist Ist (L to R) : Andy Keating (bass), Adam Houghton (vocals, guitar), Joel Kay (drums), Mat Peters (synthesiser keyboards, guitar) in concert in Kingston near London, April 2023

Background information
- Origin: Greater Manchester, England
- Genre: Post-punk
- Years active: 2014–present
- Label: Kind Violence
- Members: Adam Houghton; Joel Kay; Andy Keating; Mat Peters
- Website: ististmusic.com

Ist Ist are an English post-punk band based in Greater Manchester

The group consists of Adam Houghton (vocals, guitar), Mat Peters (guitar, synthesizer keyboards), Andy Keating (bass), and Joel Kay (drums).

== History ==
The band Ist Ist was formed in late 2014, and were originally going to call themselves DAS IST, but decided it sounded too industrial, so they went with IST IST. They gained popularity in the Manchester music scene from word-of-mouth after gigs at venues such as The Ritz, Gorilla and The Deaf Institute. After a number of singles, the band released two EPs, Spinning Rooms in 2018, and Everything Is Different Now in 2019, before releasing their debut album Architecture in 2020, which hit No. 3 on the UK Independent Albums Chart.

The band recorded their second studio album The Art of Lying during the COVID-19 lockdowns of 2020. Released on 26 November 2021, it became the first charting release for IST IST, entering the UK Albums Chart at No. 87 the next week.

The band released their third studio album Protagonists on 31 March 2023, playing The O2 Ritz in Manchester, England as the headline act on the same day. An extended edition digital only LP, Protagonists - Bandcamp Deluxe Edition, was also launched the same week, including all of the tracks on Protagonists and eight bonus tracks from their live set played in Hebden Bridge, in December 2022.

On Good Friday, 7 April 2023, the band announced their highest chart rating for any of their albums to date, No. 2 on the Independent Chart, number 6 in the Vinyl Chart, No. 10 on the Physical Album sales chart, and No. 41 overall on the Album Sales chart for the UK, significant milestones for the band. After the release of Protagonists there were two dates after the O2 Ritz, at Oporto in Leeds and at The Fighting Cocks in Kingston, near London, the latter of which was notable for the band's first ever live Q&A session with the audience before the performance. After a short Easter break, the band plan to tour the UK from 13 April, including dates at Glasgow, Newcastle, Nottingham, Birmingham, The Thekla in Bristol and London's Omeara. The UK leg of the tour finished in Whitby at the Tomorrow's Ghosts Festival, before they performed in Antwerp, Cologne, Paris, Rees, Nijmegen, Bielefeld, Rotterdam, Hulst, The Melkweg in Amsterdam, and Berlin.

On 4 December 2024, the band announced that they will play venues in Europe in April 2025, starting on 2 April 2025 in Stockholm, then in Oslo, Esbjerg, Tilburg, Bologna, Milan, Stuttgart, Leipzig, and Berlin, and finishing the tour on 16 April 2025 in Hannover.

Ist Ist played two sold out 10th anniversary shows in January 2025. The first was at Manchester's Night & Day Cafe on Thursday 16 January 2025 - the location of their first gig in 2014, exactly ten years to the day. A second concert was held at the Gorilla venue, also in Manchester, on Friday, 17 January 2025.

== Band members ==
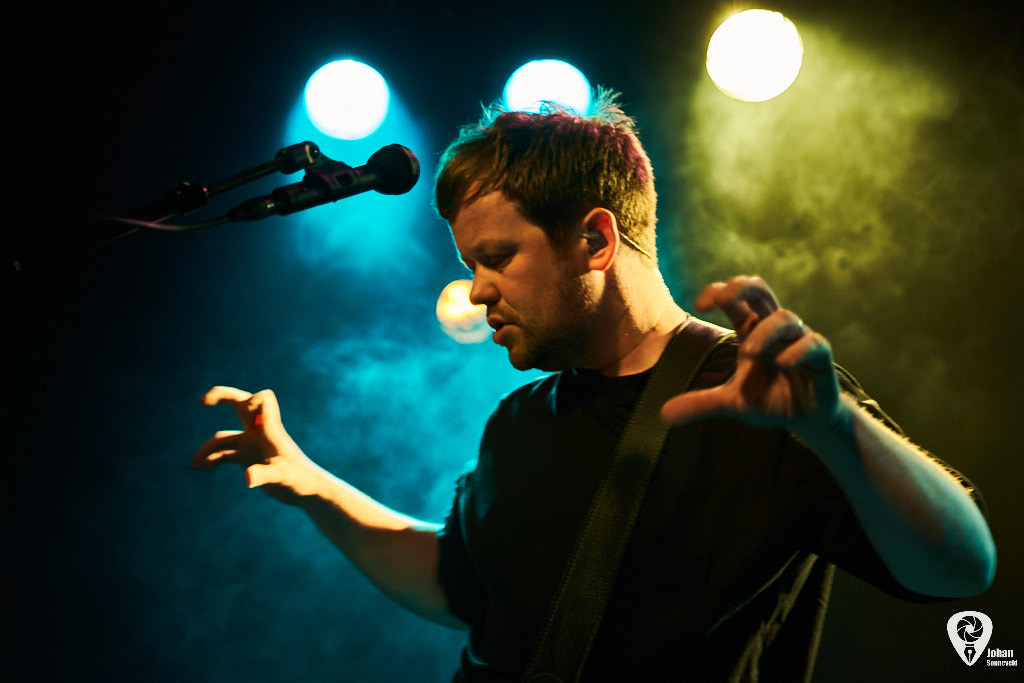
Adam Houghton in June 2023

- Adam Houghton – lead vocals, guitar (2014–present)
- Joel Kay – drums and occasional backing vocals (2014–present)
- Andy Keating – bass, occasional backing vocals (2014–present)
- Mat Peters – synthesiser keyboards and guitars (2018–present)

== Discography ==
=== Albums ===
- Architecture (2020)
- The Art of Lying (2021)
- Protagonists (2023)
- Light a Bigger Fire (2024)
- Dagger (2026)

=== EPs ===
- B (2016)
- Spinning Rooms (2018)
- Prologue (2018)
- Everything Is Different Now (2019)
- Sessions (2019)

=== Live albums ===
- Live (2017)
- Live at St Philip's Church (2018)
- Live at Gorilla (2019)
- Live at Sacred Trinity Church (2020)
- Live at The Met (2020)
- Live at The Trades Club (2020)
- Live from the Attic (2020)
- Live at Manchester Academy 1 (2022)
- Live in Amsterdam (2023)
- Live at Paradiso (2026)
