= List of Official Vinyl Albums Chart number ones of the 2020s =

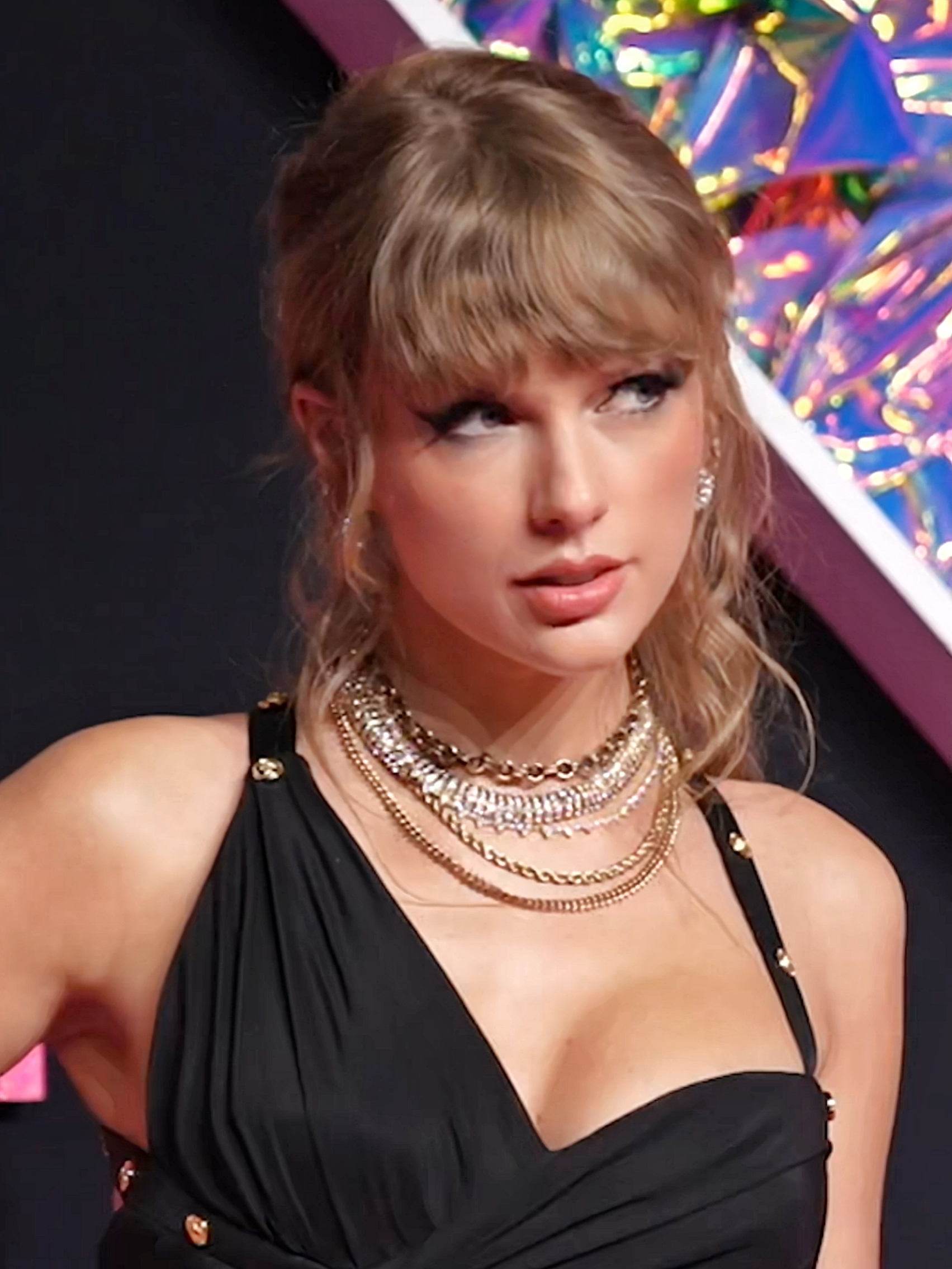
Taylor Swift holds the record for the most number-ones during the decade with 9 albums.

The Official Vinyl Albums Chart is a weekly record chart compiled by the Official Charts Company (OCC) on behalf of the music industry in the United Kingdom. It lists the 40 most popular albums in the gramophone record (or "vinyl") format. This is a list of the albums which have been number one on the Official Vinyl Albums Chart in the 2020s.

== Number ones ==
Key
No.	nth album to top the Official Vinyl Albums Chart
re	Return of an album to number one
†	Best-selling vinyl album of the year

No.	Artist (Note: The artist, album, date of reaching number one and number of weeks at number one are those given by the OCC.)	Album	Record label (Note: The record labels are those given by the OCC.)	Reached number one (for the week ending)	Weeks at number one	Ref.
2020
re	Fleetwood Mac	Rumours †	WEA	2 January 2020	1	
re	Amy Winehouse	Back to Black	Island	9 January 2020	1	
re	Fleetwood Mac	Rumours †	WEA	16 January 2020	1	
208	Easy Life	Junk Food	Island	23 January 2020	1	
209	Courteeners	More. Again. Forever.	Ignition	30 January 2020	1	
210	Pet Shop Boys	Hotspot	x2	6 February 2020	1	
211	Blossoms	Foolish Loving Spaces	EMI	13 February 2020	1	
212	Green Day	Father of All...	Reprise	20 February 2020	1	
213	Tame Impala	The Slow Rush	Fiction	27 February 2020	1	
214	Ozzy Osbourne	Ordinary Man	Epic	5 March 2020	1	
215	The Orielles	Disco Volador	Heavenly	12 March 2020	1	
216	Paul Heaton and Jacqui Abbott	Manchester Calling	EMI	19 March 2020	1	
217	The Snuts	Mixtape	Parlophone	26 March 2020	1	
218	David Bowie	Is It Any Wonder? (EP)	Parlophone	2 April 2020	1	
219	Dua Lipa	Future Nostalgia	Warner	9 April 2020	1	
220	The Lovely Eggs	I Am Moron	Egg	16 April 2020	1	
221	The Killers	Hot Fuss	UMC/Virgin	23 April 2020	1	
222	Gerry Cinnamon	The Bonny	Little Runaway	30 April 2020	1	
223	Tom Misch & Yussef Dayes	What Kinda Music	Beyond the Groove/Blue Note	7 May 2020	1	
224	The Strokes	The New Abnormal	Cult	14 May 2020	1	
225	Hayley Williams	Petals for Armor	Atlantic	21 May 2020	1	
226	Sleaford Mods	All That Glue	Rough Trade	28 May 2020	1	
227	The 1975	Notes on a Conditional Form	Dirty Hit/Polydor	4 June 2020	1	
228	Lady Gaga	Chromatica	Interscope	11 June 2020	1	
229	Sports Team	Deep Down Happy	Big Desert/Island	18 June 2020	1	
230	Liam Gallagher	MTV Unplugged (Live at Hull City Hall)	Warner	25 June 2020	1	
231	Neil Young	Homegrown	Reprise	2 July 2020	1	
232	Haim	Women in Music Pt. III	Polydor/Vertigo Berlin/Columbia	9 July 2020	1	
233	Paul Weller	On Sunset	Polydor	16 July 2020	1	
234	The Streets	None of Us Are Getting Out of This Life Alive	Island	23 July 2020	1	
235	Bob Dylan	Rough and Rowdy Ways	Columbia	30 July 2020	1	
236	Various artists	Songs for the National Health Service	Blood Records/Flying Vinyl	6 August 2020	1	
237	Fontaines D.C.	A Hero's Death	Partisan	13 August 2020	1	
238	Glass Animals	Dreamland	Polydor	20 August 2020	1	
239	Biffy Clyro	A Celebration of Endings	Warner	27 August 2020	1	
240	Erasure	The Neon	Mute	3 September 2020	1	
241	David Bowie	ChangesNowBowie	Parlophone	10 September 2020	1	
242	The Rolling Stones	Goats Head Soup	Polydor	17 September 2020	1	
243	Doves	The Universal Want	EMI	24 September 2020	1	
244	Run the Jewels	RTJ4	BMG	1 October 2020	1	
245	Idles	Ultra Mono	Partisan	8 October 2020	1	
246	Oasis	(What's the Story) Morning Glory?	Big Brother	15 October 2020	1	
247	Iron Maiden	Iron Maiden	Parlophone	22 October 2020	1	
248	The Vamps	Cherry Blossom	EMI	29 October 2020	1	
249	Bruce Springsteen	Letter to You	Columbia	5 November 2020	1	
250	The Style Council	Long Hot Summers: The Story of The Style Council	Polydor/UMC	12 November 2020	1	
251	Kylie Minogue	Disco	BMG	19 November 2020	1	
252	AC/DC	Power Up	Columbia	26 November 2020	1	
253	Taylor Swift	Folklore	EMI	3 December 2020	1	
254	Steps	What the Future Holds	BMG	10 December 2020	1	
255	Arctic Monkeys	Live at the Royal Albert Hall	Domino	17 December 2020	1	
256	The Killers	Imploding the Mirage	EMI	24 December 2020	1	
257	Paul McCartney	McCartney III	EMI	31 December 2020	1	
2021
re	Amy Winehouse	Back to Black	Island	7 January 2021	2	
258	Viagra Boys	Welfare Jazz	YEAR0001	21 January 2021	1	
259	Sleaford Mods	Spare Ribs	Rough Trade	28 January 2021	1	
260	Bicep	Isles	Ninja Tune	4 February 2021	1	
261	Celeste	Not Your Muse	Polydor	11 February 2021	1	
262	Foo Fighters	Medicine at Midnight	Columbia	18 February 2021	1	
263	Slowthai	Tyron	Method	25 February 2021	1	
264	Mogwai	As the Love Continues	Rock Action	4 March 2021	1	
265	Architects	For Those That Wish to Exist	Epitaph	11 March 2021	1	
266	Kings of Leon	When You See Yourself	Columbia	18 March 2021	1	
267	Tom Grennan	Evering Road	Insanity	25 March 2021	1	
268	Lana Del Rey	Chemtrails Over the Country Club	Polydor	1 April 2021	1	
269	Ben Howard	Collections from the Whiteout	Island	8 April 2021	1	
270	The Snuts	W.L.	Parlophone	15 April 2021	1	
271	Ariana Grande	Positions	Republic	22 April 2021	1	
272	London Grammar	Californian Soil	Ministry of Sound	29 April 2021	1	
273	Selecter	Too Much Pressure	Chrysalis	6 May 2021	1	
274	Royal Blood	Typhoons	Warner	13 May 2021	1	
275	Squid	Bright Green Field	Wrap	20 May 2021	1	
276	Paul Weller	Fat Pop	Polydor	27 May 2021	1	
277	My Bloody Valentine	Loveless	Domino/MBV	3 June 2021	1	
278	Taylor Swift	Evermore	EMI	10 June 2021	1	
279	Wolf Alice	Blue Weekend	Dirty Hit	17 June 2021	1	
280	Noel Gallagher's High Flying Birds	Back the Way We Came - Vol 1	Sour Mash	24 June 2021	1	
281	Nick Cave and Warren Ellis	Carnage	Goliath	1 July 2021	1	
282	John Grant	Boy from Michigan	Bella Union	8 July 2021	1	
re	Queen	Greatest Hits	UMC	15 July 2021	1	
283	Inhaler	It Won't Always Be Like This	Polydor	22 July 2021	1	
284	KSI	All Over the Place	BMG	29 July 2021	1	
285	Dave	We're All Alone in This Together	Neighbourhood	5 August 2021	1	
286	Billie Eilish	Happier Than Ever	Interscope	12 August 2021	1	
287	George Harrison	All Things Must Pass	Apple	19 August 2021	1	
288	The Killers	Pressure Machine	EMI	26 August 2021	1	
289	Olivia Rodrigo	Sour	Geffen	2 September 2021	1	
290	Halsey	If I Can't Have Love, I Want Power	EMI	9 September 2021	1	
291	Iron Maiden	Senjutsu	Parlophone	16 September 2021	1	
292	Manic Street Preachers	The Ultra Vivid Lament	Columbia	23 September 2021	1	
293	Primal Scream	Screamadelica	Music On Vinyl	30 September 2021	1	
294	Lathums	How Beautiful Life Can Be	Island	7 October 2021	1	
295	The Specials	Protest Songs 1924-2012	Island	14 October 2021	1	
296	Sam Fender	Seventeen Going Under	Polydor	21 October 2021	1	
297	Coldplay	Music of the Spheres	Parlophone	28 October 2021	1	
298	Lana Del Rey	Blue Banisters	Polydor	4 November 2021	1	
299	Ed Sheeran	=	Asylum	11 November 2021	1	
300	ABBA	Voyage †	Polar	18 November 2021	1	
301	Idles	Crawler	Partisan	25 November 2021	1	
302	Adele	30	Columbia	2 December 2021	5	
2022
re	Fleetwood Mac	Rumours	WEA	6 January 2022	1	
re	Kylie Minogue	Disco	BMG	13 January 2022	1	
303	David Bowie	Hunky Dory	Simply Vinyl	20 January 2022	1	
304	The Wombats	Fix Yourself, Not the World	The Wombats	27 January 2022	1	
305	Yard Act	The Overload	Island	3 February 2022	1	
306	Don Broco	Amazing Things	SharpTone	10 February 2022	1	
307	Black Country, New Road	Ants from Up There	Ninja Tune	17 February 2022	1	
308	Frank Turner	FTHC	Polydor	24 February 2022	1	
309	Metronomy	Small World	Because Music	3 March 2022	1	
310	Tears for Fears	The Tipping Point	Concord	10 March 2022	1	
311	Stereophonics	Oochya!	Stylus	17 March 2022	1	
312	Rex Orange County	Who Cares	Columbia	24 March 2022	1	
313	Charli XCX	Crash	Asylum	31 March 2022	1	
314	Placebo	Never Let Me Go	So Recordings	7 April 2022	1	
315	Red Hot Chili Peppers	Unlimited Love	Warner	14 April 2022	1	
316	Wet Leg	Wet Leg	Domino	21 April 2022	1	
317	The Police	Greatest Hits	Polydor/UMC	28 April 2022	1	
318	Fontaines D.C.	Skinty Fia	Partisan	5 May 2022	1	
319	Blossoms	Ribbon Around the Bomb	EMI	12 May 2022	1	
320	Arcade Fire	We	Columbia	19 May 2022	1	
321	Florence & the Machine	Dance Fever	Polydor	26 May 2022	1	
322	Harry Styles	Harry's House	Columbia	2 June 2022	1	
323	Liam Gallagher	C'mon You Know	Warner	9 June 2022	1	
re	Harry Styles	Harry's House	Columbia	16 June 2022	1	
324	George Ezra	Gold Rush Kid	Columbia	23 June 2022	1	
325	Foals	Life Is Yours	Warner	30 June 2022	1	
326	Porcupine Tree	Closure/Continuation	Music for Nations	7 July 2022	1	
327	Paolo Nutini	Last Night in the Bittersweet	Atlantic	14 July 2022	1	
328	James Bay	Leap	EMI	21 July 2022	1	
329	Beabadoobee	Beatopia	Dirty Hit	28 July 2022	1	
330	Jamie T	The Theory of Whatever	Polydor	4 August 2022	1	
331	Beyoncé	Renaissance	Columbia/Parkwood Entertainment	11 August 2022	1	
re	Glass Animals	Dreamland	Polydor	18 August 2022	1	
332	Kasabian	The Alchemist's Euphoria	Columbia	25 August 2022	1	
re	Oasis	Be Here Now	Big Brother	1 September 2022	1	
333	Muse	Will of the People	Warner	8 September 2022	1	
334	Yungblud	Yungblud	Geffen	15 September 2022	1	
335	Ozzy Osbourne	Patient Number 9	Columbia	22 September 2022	1	
336	Rina Sawayama	Hold the Girl	Dirty Hit	29 September 2022	1	
337	Sports Team	Gulp!	Island	6 October 2022	1	
338	George Michael	Older	Sony	13 October 2022	1	
339	Easy Life	Maybe in Another Life	Island	20 October 2022	1	
340	The 1975	Being Funny in a Foreign Language	Dirty Hit	27 October 2022	1	
341	Taylor Swift	Midnights †	EMI	3 November 2022	1	
342	The Beatles	Revolver	EMI	10 November 2022	1	
343	The Prodigy	The Fat of the Land	XL	17 November 2022	1	
344	Louis Tomlinson	Faith in the Future	BMG	24 November 2022	1	
345	Dermot Kennedy	Sonder	Island	1 December 2022	1	
re	Taylor Swift	Midnights †	EMI	8 December 2022	2	
346	Sam Fender	Live from Finsbury Park	Polydor	22 December 2022	1	
re	Taylor Swift	Midnights †	EMI	29 December 2022	4	
2023
347	Courteeners	St. Jude	A&M	26 January 2023	1	
348	The Reytons	What's Rock and Roll	The Reytons	2 February 2023	1	
349	Sam Smith	Gloria	Capitol	9 February 2023	1	
350	Shania Twain	Queen of Me	EMI	16 February 2023	1	
351	Paramore	This Is Why	Altantic	23 February 2023	1	
352	Inhaler	Cuts & Bruises	Polydor	2 March 2023	1	
353	Gorillaz	Cracker Island	Parlophone	9 March 2023	1	
354	Slowthai	Ugly	Method	16 March 2023	1	
355	Sleaford Mods	UK Grim	Rough Trade	23 March 2023	1	
356	U2	Songs of Surrender	Island	30 March 2023	1	
357	Lana Del Rey	Did You Know That There's a Tunnel Under Ocean Blvd	Polydor	6 April 2023	1	
358	Boygenius	The Record	Interscope	13 April 2023	1	
359	Daughter	Stereo Mind Game	4AD	20 April 2023	1	
360	Metallica	72 Seasons	EMI	27 April 2023	1	
361	Taylor Swift	Folklore - The Long Pond Studio Sessions	EMI	4 May 2023	1	
362	The National	First Two Pages of Frankenstein	4AD	11 May 2023	1	
363	Ed Sheeran	-	Asylum	18 May 2023	1	
364	Daft Punk	Random Access Memories	Columbia	25 May 2023	1	
365	Lewis Capaldi	Broken by Desire to Be Heavenly Sent	EMI	1 June 2023	1	
366	Arlo Parks	My Soft Machine	Transgressive	8 June 2023	1	
367	Noel Gallagher's High Flying Birds	Council Skies	Sour Mash	15 June 2023	1	
368	Niall Horan	The Show	Capitol	22 June 2023	1	
369	Queens of the Stone Age	In Times New Roman	Matador	29 June 2023	1	
370	Maisie Peters	The Good Witch	Atlantic/Gingerbread Man	6 July 2023	1	
371	Grian Chatten	Chaos for the Fly	Partisan	13 July 2023	1	
372	Taylor Swift	Speak Now (Taylor's Version)	EMI	13 July 2023	1	
373	Gerry Cinnamon	Live At Hampden Park	Little Runaway	27 July 2023	1	
374	Blur	The Ballad of Darren	Parlophone	3 August 2023	1	
375	Anne-Marie	Unhealthy	Atlantic	10 August 2023	1	
376	Skindred	Smile	Earache	17 August 2023	1	
377	Liam Gallagher	Knebworth 22	Warner	24 August 2023	1	
378	Hozier	Unreal Unearth	Island	31 August 2023	1	
379	Claire Richards	Euphoria	Edsel	7 September 2023	1	
380	Royal Blood	Back to the Water Below	Warner	14 September 2023	1	
381	Olivia Rodrigo	Guts	Geffen	21 September 2023	1	
382	Busted	Greatest Hits 2.0	Juno Music	28 September 2023	1	
383	Kylie Minogue	Tension	BMG	5 October 2023	1	
384	Ed Sheeran	Autumn Variations	Gingerbread Man	12 October 2023	1	
385	Roger Waters	The Dark Side of the Moon Redux	Cooking Vinyl	19 October 2023	1	
386	Troye Sivan	Something to Give Each Other	Polydor	26 October 2023	1	
387	The Rolling Stones	Hackney Diamonds	Polydor	2 November 2023	1	
388	Taylor Swift	1989 (Taylor's Version) †	EMI	9 November 2023	1	
389	Oasis	The Masterplan	Big Brother	16 November 2023	1	
390	The Beatles	1967–1970	Apple Corps	23 November 2023	1	
391	Madness	Theatre of the Absurd Presents C'est la Vie	BMG	30 November 2023	1	
392	Take That	Take That	EMI	7 December 2023	1	
re	Taylor Swift	1989 (Taylor's Version) †	EMI	14 December 2023	1	
393	The Killers	Rebel Diamonds	EMI	21 December 2023	1	
re	Taylor Swift	1989 (Taylor's Version) †	EMI	28 December 2023	2	
2024
394	ABBA	ABBA Gold	Polydor/UMR	11 January 2024	1	
395	Shed Seven	A Matter of Time	Cooking Vinyl	18 January 2024	1	
396	The Vaccines	Pick-Up Full of Pink Carnations	Super Easy	25 January 2024	1	
397	Green Day	Saviors	Reprise	1 February 2024	1	
398	The Smile	Wall of Eyes	XL	8 February 2024	1	
399	Last Dinner Party	Prelude to Ecstasy	Island	15 February 2024	1	
400	Noah Kahan	Stick Season	Republic	22 February 2024	1	
401	Idles	Tangk	Partisan	29 February 2024	1	
402	The Snuts	Millennials	Partisan	7 March 2024	1	
403	Liam Gallagher and John Squire	Liam Gallagher John Squire	Warner	14 March 2024	1	
404	Ariana Grande	Eternal Sunshine	Republic	21 March 2024	1	
405	Kacey Musgraves	Deeper Well	Interscope	28 March 2024	1	
406	Elbow	Audio Vertigo	Polydor	4 April 2024	1	
407	Beyoncé	Cowboy Carter	Columbia/Parkwood Entertainment	11 April 2024	1	
408	The Libertines	All Quiet on the Eastern Esplanade	EMI	18 April 2024	1	
409	James	Yummy	Nothing But Love	25 April 2024	1	
410	Taylor Swift	The Tortured Poets Department †	EMI	2 May 2024	1	
411	Pet Shop Boys	Nonetheless	Parlophone	9 May 2024	1	
412	Dua Lipa	Radical Optimism	Warner	16 May 2024	1	
413	Kings of Leon	Can We Please Have Fun	Polydor	23 May 2024	1	
414	Billie Eilish	Hit Me Hard and Soft	Interscope	30 May 2024	1	
415	Twenty One Pilots	Clancy	Atlantic/Fueled By Ramen	6 June 2024	1	
416	Richard Hawley	In This City They Call You Love	BMG	13 June 2024	1	
417	Charli XCX	Brat	Atlantic	20 June 2024	1	
418	Fred Again	USB	Atlantic	27 June 2024	1	
419	Gracie Abrams	The Secret of Us	Interscope	4 July 2024	1	
re	Dua Lipa	Future Nostalgia	Warner	11 July 2024	1	
420	Kasabian	Happenings	Columbia	18 July 2024	1	
421	Cigarettes After Sex	X's	Partisan	25 July 2024	1	
re	Olivia Rodrigo	Guts	Geffen	1 August 2024	1	
422	Blur	Live at Wembley Stadium	Parlophone	8 August 2024	1	
423	Chappell Roan	The Rise and Fall of a Midwest Princess	Island	15 August 2024	1	
424	Beabadoobee	This Is How Tomorrow Moves	Dirty Hit	22 August 2024	1	
425	Post Malone	F-1 Trillion	Republic	29 August 2024	1	
426	Fontaines D.C.	Romance	XL	5 September 2024	1	
re	Oasis	Definitely Maybe	Creation	12 September 2024	1	
427	David Gilmour	Luck and Strange	Sony	19 September 2024	1	
428	London Grammar	The Greatest Love	Ministry of Sound	26 September 2024	1	
429	Blossoms	Gary	ODD SK Recordings	3 October 2024	1	
430	Shed Seven	Liquid Gold	Cooking Vinyl	10 October 2024	1	
431	Coldplay	Moon Music	Parlophone	17 October 2024	1	
re	Charli XCX	Brat	Atlantic	24 October 2024	1	
432	Kylie Minogue	Tension II	BMG	31 October 2024	1	
433	Courteeners	Pink Cactus Café	Ignition	7 November 2024	1	
434	The Cure	Songs of a Lost World	Polydor	14 November 2024	2	
435	Linkin Park	From Zero	Warner	28 November 2024	1	
436	Michael Kiwanuka	Small Changes	Polydor	5 December 2024	1	
re	Taylor Swift	The Tortured Poets Department †	EMI	12 December 2024	2	
437	The Reytons	Clifton Park	The Reytons	26 December 2024	1	
2025
re	Chappell Roan	The Rise and Fall of a Midwest Princess	Island	2 January 2025	1	
438	Ed Sheeran	+–=÷× (Tour Collection)	Asylum/Atlantic	9 January 2025	1	
439	Elton John	Diamonds	Mercury	16 January 2025	1	
re	Chappell Roan	The Rise and Fall of a Midwest Princess	Island	23 January 2025	1	
re	Gracie Abrams	The Secret of Us	Interscope	30 January 2025	1	
440	FKA Twigs	Eusexua	Young	6 February 2025	1	
441	The Weeknd	Hurry Up Tomorrow	Republic/XO	13 February 2025	1	
442	Taylor Swift	Lover (Live from Paris)	EMI	20 February 2025	1	
443	Manic Street Preachers	Critical Thinking	Columbia	27 February 2025	1	
444	Sam Fender	People watching	Polydor	6 March 2025	1	
445	Oasis	Standing on the Shoulder of Giants	Big Brother	13 March 2025	1	
446	Lady Gaga	Mayhem	Polydor	20 March 2025	1	
447	Steven Wilson	The Overview	Fiction	27 March 2025	1	
448	The Lottery Winners	Koko	Modern Sky	3 April 2025	1	
449	The Darkness	Dreams on Toast	Cooking Vinyl	10 April 2025	1	
450	Elton John and Brandi Carlile	Who Believes in Angels?	EMI	17 April 2025	1	
451	Sam Fender	Me and the Dog	Polydor	24 April 2025	1	
452	Doechii	Alligator Bites Never Heal	Capitol	1 May 2025	1	
453	Ghost	Skeletá	Loma Vista	8 May 2025	1	
454	Pink Floyd	Pink Floyd at Pompeii - MCMLXXII	Sony	15 May 2025	1	
455	Sleep Token	Even in Arcadia	RCA	22 May 2025	1	
456	Peter Doherty	Felt Better Alive	Strap Originals	29 May 2025	1	
457	Sparks	Mad!	Transgressive	5 June 2025	1	
458	The 1975	Still... At Their Very Best Live	Dirty Hit	12 June 2025	1	
459	Pulp	More	Rough Trade	19 June 2025	1	
460	James Marriott	Don't Tell the Dog	AWAL	26 June 2025	1	
461	Yungblud	Idols	Capitol	3 July 2025	1	
462	Lorde	Virgin	EMI	10 July 2025	1	
463	Sabrina Carpenter	Short n' Sweet	Island	17 July 2025	1	
464	Wet Leg	Moisturizer	Domino	24 July 2025	1	
465	Tyler, the Creator	Don't Tap the Glass	Columbia	31 July 2025	1	
466	The K's	Pretty on the Internet	LAB	7 August 2025	1	
467	Reneé Rapp	Bite Me	Interscope	14 August 2025	1	
468	The Royston Club	Songs for the Spine	Modern Sky/ Run On	21 August 2025	1	
469	Conan Gray	Wishbone	Island	28 August 2025	1	
470	Wolf Alice	The Clearing	Columbia	4 September 2025	1	
471	Sabrina Carpenter	Man's Best Friend	Island	11 September 2025	1	
472	Suede	Antidepressants	BMG	18 September 2025	1	
473	Twenty One Pilots	Breach	Atlantic/Fueled by Ramen	25 September 2025	1	
474	Biffy Clyro	Futique	Warner	2 October 2025	1	
475	Olivia Dean	The Art of Loving	Polydor	9 October 2025	1	
476	Taylor Swift	The Life of a Showgirl †	EMI	16 October 2025	1	
477	Richard Ashcroft	Lovin' You	Richard Ashcroft/RPA	23 October 2025	1	
478	The Last Dinner Party	From the Pyre	Island	30 October 2025	1	
479	Dave	The Boy Who Played the Harp	Neighbourhood	6 November 2025	1	
480	Florence and the Machine	Everybody Scream	Polydor	13 November 2025	1	
re	Lady Gaga	Mayhem	Polydor	20 November 2025	1	
481	Oasis	Familiar to Millions	Big Brother	27 November 2025	1	
482	Aerosmith and Yungblud	One More Time	Island	4 December 2025	1	
re	Olivia Dean	The Art of Loving	Polydor	11 December 2025	1	
483	Kylie Minogue	Kylie Christmas	Rhino	18 December 2025	1	
484	Pink Floyd	Wish You Were Here	Harvest	25 December 2025	1	
2026
re	Olivia Dean	The Art of Loving	Polydor	1 January 2026	3	
485	The Cribs	Selling a Vibe	Play It Again Sam	22 January 2026	1	
486	Sleaford Mods	The Demise of Planet X	Rough Trade	29 January 2026	1	
487	Louis Tomlinson	How Did I Get Here?	BMG	5 February 2026	1	
488	Lily Allen	West End Girl	BMG	12 February 2026	1	
489	Lorien Testard	Clair Obscur - Expedition 33 Ost	Laced	19 February 2026	1	
490	Charli XCX	Wuthering Heights	Atlantic	26 February 2026	1	
491	George Michael	Faith	Epic	5 March 2026	1	
492	Gorillaz	The Mountain	Kong	12 March 2026	1	
493	Harry Styles	Kiss All the Time. Disco, Occasionally	Columbia	19 March 2026	1	
494	James Blake	Trying Times	Good Boy	26 March 2026	1	
495	BTS	Arirang	Big Hit	2 April 2026	1	
496	Raye	This Music May Contain Hope	Human Re Sources	9 April 2026	1	
497	Dermot Kennedy	The Weight of the Woods	Island	16 April 2026	1	
498	Holly Humberstone	Cruel World	Polydor	23 April 2026	1	
499	Skindred	You Got This	Earache	30 April 2026	1	
500	Noah Kahan	The Great Divide	Mercury	7 May 2026	1	
501	Kneecap	Fenian	Heavenly	14 May 2026	1	
502	Reverend and the Makers	Is This How Happiness Feels?	Distiller	21 May 2026	1	
503	Freya Skye	Stardust	Polydor	28 May 2026	1	
504	Maisie Peters	Florescence	Atlantic/Gingerman	4 June 2026	1	
505	Paul McCartney	The Boys of Dungeon Lane	Capitol	11 June 2026	1	
506	Niall Horan	Dinner Party	EMI	18 June 2026	1	
507	Olivia Rodrigo	You Seem Pretty Sad for a Girl So in Love	Geffen	25 June 2026	1	
508	Myles Smith	My Mess, My Heart, My Life	It's Okay to Feel/Sony	2 July 2026	1	
509	Muse	The Wow! Signal	Warner	9 July 2026	1	
510	Madonna	Confessions II	Warner	16 July 2026	1	
511	Rolling Stones	Foreign Tongues	Polydor	23 July 2026	1	
512	Gracie Abrams	Daughter from Hell	Interscope	30 July 2026	1	
513	Charli XCX	Music, Fashion, Film	Atlantic	6 August 2026	1	
514	Ariana Grande	Petal	Republic	13 August 2026	1	
515	The Reytons	A Love Letter to a Broken Town	The Reytons	20 August 2026	1	
516	Phoebe Bridgers	Lost Weekend	Dead Oceans	27 August 2026	1	
517	Paul Heaton	Jenius	EMI	3 September 2026	1	
518	Alex Warren	Wildchild	Atlantic	10 September 2026	1	
519	President	Blood of Your Empire	Atlantic	17 September 2026	1	
520	Ezra Collective	Here Because of Hope	Partisan	24 September 2026	1	
521	Beabadoobee	Pylon	Dirty Hit/Interscope	1 October 2026	1	
522	Keo	Put a Smile on for me	Island	8 October 2026	1	
523	The Beatles	Rubber Soul	Apple Corps	15 October 2026	1	
524	Jamie T	Ghosts (100 Days of Morning)	Polydor	22 October 2026	1	
525	Fontaines D.C.	Dopamine Chamber	XL	29 October 2026	1	
526	My Chemical Romance	The Black Parade	Reprise	5 November 2026	1	
527	Queens of the Stone Age	Perfecth	Matador	12 November 2026	1	
528	Royal Blood	Dead Company	Warner	19 November 2026	1	

=== By record label ===
As of the week ending 19 November 2026, twenty six record labels have topped the chart for at least three weeks.

Record label	Number-one album(s)	Weeks at number one
Polydor	36	42
EMI	32	40
Island	22	23
Columbia	21	26
Warner	18	18
Atlantic	14	15
Parlophone	12	12
BMG	13	13
Interscope	9	10
Partisan	9	9
Dirty Hit	8	8
Republic	6	6
Big Brother	5	5
Rough Trade	5	5
Capitol	5	5
Geffen	4	5
UMC	4	4
Asylum Records	4	4
Cooking Vinyl	4	4
Reprise	4	4
WEA	1	3
Domino	4	4
Sony	4	4
XL	4	4
The Reytons	3	3
Apple Corps	3	3

=== By artist ===
As of the week ending 19 November 2026, Twenty four artists topped the chart for at least three weeks.

Artist	Number-one album(s)	Weeks at number one
Taylor Swift	9	20
Oasis	6	6
Kylie Minogue	4	5
Olivia Dean	1	5
Charli XCX	4	5
The Killers	4	4
Liam Gallagher	4	4
Ed Sheeran	4	4
Sleaford Mods	4	4
Olivia Rodrigo	3	4
David Bowie	3	3
Idles	3	3
Lana Del Rey	3	3
The Snuts	3	3
Dua Lipa	2	3
Amy Winehouse	1	3
Fleetwood Mac	1	3
Fontaines D.C.	3	3
Blossoms	3	3
Chappell Roan	1	3
Lady Gaga	2	3
The Reytons	3	3
The Beatles	3	3
Royal Blood	3	3

== See also ==
- List of Official Vinyl Singles Chart number ones of the 2020s
