= Gulp (disambiguation) =

A gulp refers to the act of swallowing.

Gulp may also refer to:

- Grenada United Labour Party
- Rai Gulp, an Italian children's television channel
- Gulp (film), British animated short film
- Gulp (Iraq), a city in Kurdistan and scene of several battles in Operation Viking Hammer
- Gulp (river), in eastern Belgium and southeastern Netherlands
- The "Big Gulp", a soft drink sold at 7-Eleven
- Gulp: Adventures on the Alimentary Canal, a book by Mary Roach
- Gulp (band), a Wales-based band formed by Guto Pryce and Lindsey Leven
- gulp.js, a JavaScript automation tool
- Gulp!, a 2022 album by English band Sports Team
- gulp, a collective noun for a group of swallows
