= Kendal Calling =

Music and arts festival in Cumbria, England

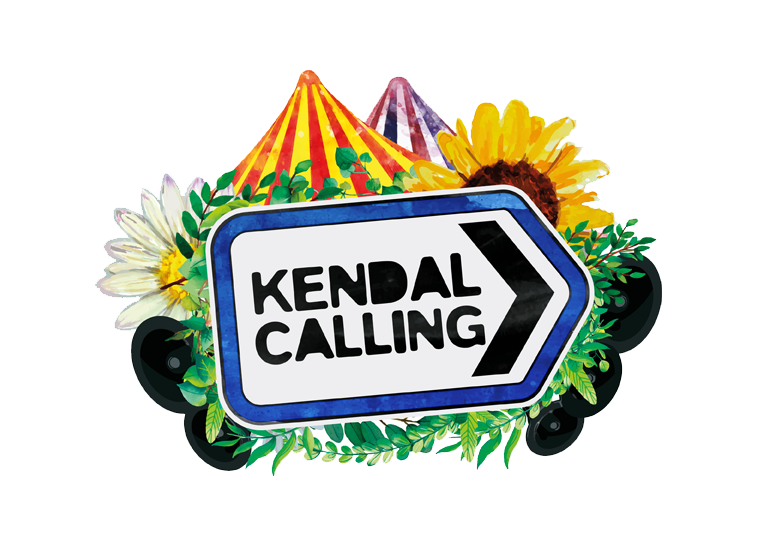
- Genre: Rock, indie, dance, folk, comedy, and electro
- Dates: Last weekend of July (4 days)
- Locations: Lowther Deer Park, the Lake District, Cumbria, England
- Years active: Since 2006
- Website: kendalcalling.co.uk

Kendal Calling is a music and arts festival, held annually at Lowther Deer Park in the Lake District, Cumbria in the North West of England. It has grown from a two-day, 900 capacity event in 2006 to a 40,000 capacity 4-day music festival in the present day.

Kendal Calling has 9 stages and has featured live performances from notable artists such as Blondie, Pendulum, The Prodigy, Dizzee Rascal, James, Mumford & Sons, Calvin Harris and Fatboy Slim. In 2010 Kendal Calling was awarded the Best Small UK Festival Award at the UK Festival Awards, as voted by the public. Kendal Calling also won the industry award 'Best Small Festival' at the LIVE UK awards 2011. Superstruct Entertainment, the live entertainment platform backed by Providence Equity Partners, owns the festival after it entered definitive agreement for the acquisition of several live music and entertainment festivals from Global Media & Entertainment and Broadwick Live.

== History ==
=== 2006 ===
Kendal Calling was originally held in Abbot Hall Park overlooked by Kendal Castle. It had a capacity of 900 with a circus big top housing the majority of the performances. Saturday was headlined by Pendulum with Breaks Co-op, Nucleus Roots, Sourpuss Dj’s and Shaolin Monkey also gracing the stage. Sunday was a full day of live bands with Kendal born rockers British Sea Power closing the festival, the performance made famous by lead guitarist Martin Noble climbing the 50 ft centre pole while robots danced on stage. Also on the schedule for the day was Little Man Tate, White Rose Movement, Seven Seals, How’s My Pop and Amber 292. All tickets sold out in advance of the festival.

=== 2007 ===
Kendal Calling relocated to Grate Farm on the A591 on the outskirts of Kendal and saw an increased capacity of 2000 with more stages added to accommodate additional artists. The Friday night was headlined by BBC Radio 1’s Grooverider with Freestylers supporting on the bill. Other acts included Sourpuss Dj’s, Kendal favourite and ATIC Records founder Aim, Aqausky & Ragga twins and Pama International. The Sunday included Kendal boys Wild Beasts, The Redwings, The Answering Machine and headliners, Carl Barât's Dirty Pretty Things. All tickets sold out in advance of the festival.

=== 2008 ===
2008 saw the festival increase capacity again to 4000 and extending to 3 days. The festival was nominated for Best Small Festival, Best Line-Up, Best Toilets and Best Grass Roots Festival and was shortlisted for the latter at The UK Festival Awards. The line-up included Dizzee Rascal flying in from Ibiza to perform on the opening Friday night, only to fly back again straight after the show for a performance back on the island. Kendal Calling also welcomed back home town group British Sea Power to headline the Saturday with Welsh rockers Super Furry Animals closing the Sunday. Other acts included DJ Yoda, UK Beatbox Champion Beardyman, dan le sac vs Scroobius Pip, Scottish newcomers Glasvegas, BBC Radio 1’s longest running DJ Annie Nightingale, Scratch Perverts, Howard Marks, Frank Sidebottom and Atomic Hooligan to name just a few. Tickets sold out in advance of the festival.

=== 2009 ===
In 2009 the festival relocated, moving to Lowther Deer Park, near Penrith and raising its capacity to 6000. The festival included an outdoor main stage for the first time. Headliners included The Streets, The Zutons and Ash. Over 100 artists were confirmed including: The Sunshine Underground, Idlewild, Noah & the Whale, Goldie Lookin Chain, Twisted Wheel, Nine Black Alps, Rumblestrips, Krafty Kuts, Stanton Warriors, Beardyman, Mumford & Sons, Tommy Sparks, Frank Turner, Chase & Status, Skream, Aim, Shy FX, Ash Howell, The King Blues, Fight Like Apes, Craig Charles, Howard Marks, Iration Steppas, Tunng and Cornershop.

2009’s Kendal Calling had many new stages and area’s incorporated with a SNO!zone area including a real snow slope. The festival had increased non-musical activities such as the Holy Quail Inn pub and stage, a children's activity and performance area and a Big Love Inflatable Church were festival goers could tie the knot in fancy dress. Kendal Calling 2009 was shortlisted for Best Small Festival and Best Grass Roots Festival at the 2009 UK Festival awards. All tickets sold out in advance of the festival.

=== 2010 ===
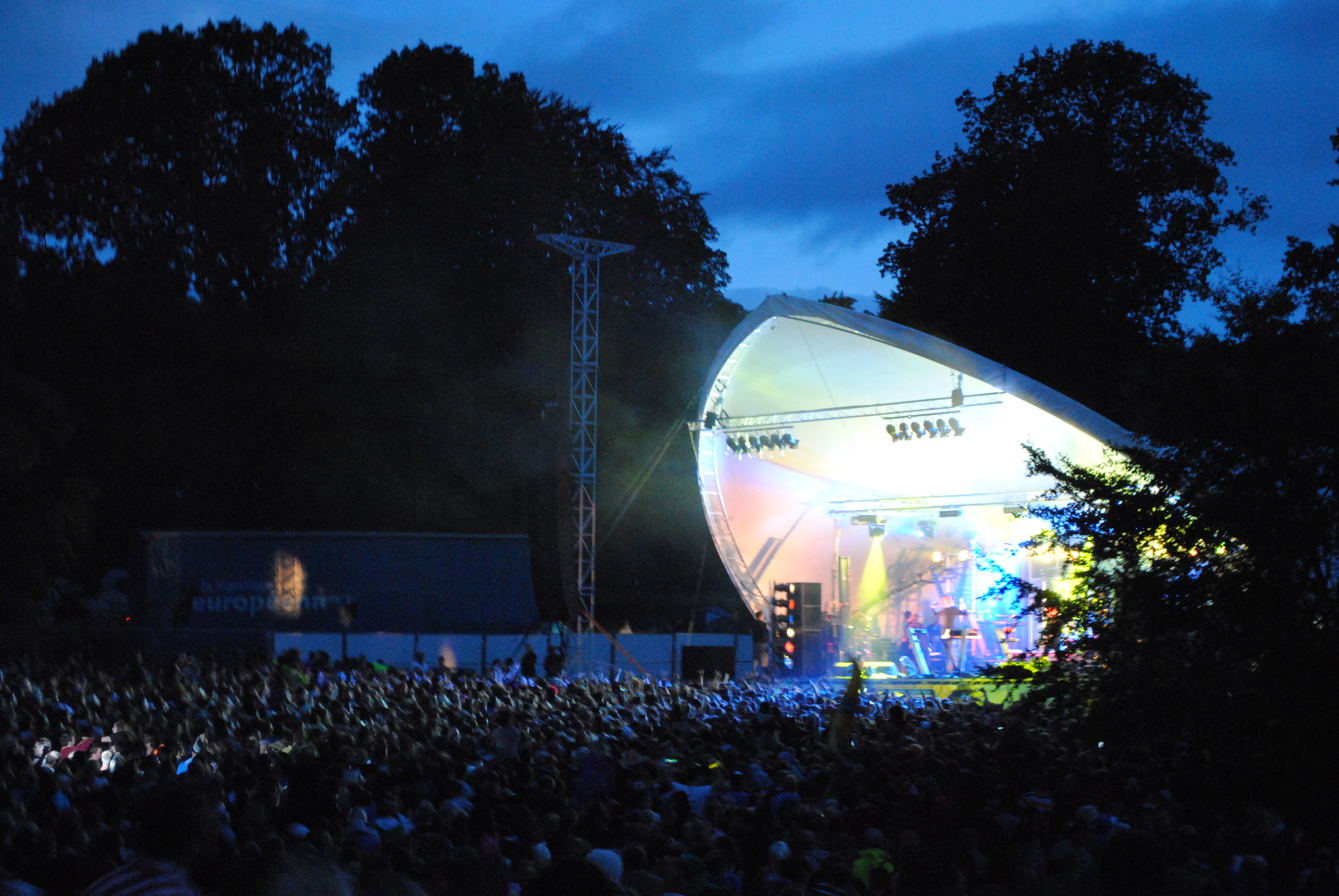
Main stage at Kendal Calling, 2010

The festival remained at Lowther Deer Park, Penrith in the Lake District. The audience rose to 8000 and there was a total of 9 stages. Earlybird tickets sold out in record time with 500 being snapped up in one minute. As with previous years all tickets for the festival sold out in advance. Headliners were Calvin Harris on the Friday, Doves on the Saturday and The Coral on the Sunday. Other acts included British Sea Power, The King Blues, The Correspondents, okgo and The Futureheads. Craig Charles once again returned to close the festival with a DJ set on the Sunday night.

The festival won Best Small UK Festival at the UK Festival Awards, as voted by the public.

=== 2011 ===
The festival remained at the Lowther Deer Park near Penrith. On 4 February 2011, the first 'wave' of acts were announced including Echo and the Bunnymen, Beardyman and The Levellers. On 1 March 2011, the second set of acts and main stage headliners were announced. Friday headliners were British drum 'n' bass artists Chase & Status, Saturday headliners were Wakefield indie outfit The Cribs and New York City New Wave/Pop group Blondie closed the festival on Sunday evening. Other artists who performed at the festival were Nero, Proud Mary, The Whip and Young Knives. The event sold out in May, 14 weeks before the festival began.

The festival went on to win the industry award 'Best Small Festival 2011' as awarded by the LIVE UK awards.

=== 2012 ===
The festival sold out in record time 4 months prior. Further stages were added included the first appearance of Tim Peaks Diner, an American style Diner created by The Charlatans (UK band) frontman Tim Burgess (artist), as well as the Kube and The Woodlands.

Artists included Dizzee Rascal, James, We Are Scientists, Maxïmo Park, Feeder, The View, Aim, The Lightning Seeds, Benga, Inspiral Carpets, Shed Seven, Utah Saints, Dodgy, Dan Le Sac vs Scroobius Pip, Andy C and Lucy Rose.

=== 2013 ===
The festival was streamed live throughout the whole weekend for the first time, with the headline acts including Basement Jaxx, Primal Scream and The Charlatans.

Other artists included up and coming indie band Kodaline, festival favourite Seasick Steve, creators of the Tim Peaks Diner, The Charlatans, as well as Public Enemy, Johnny Marr, and Clean Bandit, among others.

The festival picked up the 'Best Medium Festival UK' award, beating off competition from Latitude, Camp Bestival and Secret Garden Party following the 2013 festival.

=== 2014 ===
The festival had become a complete mud bath after 4 days of torrential rain. Bands such as The Happy Mondays, Suede, Athlete and Simon & Oscar from Ocean Colour Scene performed on the main stage.

=== 2015 ===
The festival was marred by the tragic death of a young man on the first evening. The festival itself was again a huge success. James (band) headlined on the first night. Other acts included Soul II Soul, Snoop Dogg, The Levellers, Kaiser Chiefs and Super Furry Animals who stepped in at the last minute when Kodaline pulled out due to illness.

=== 2017 ===
The 2017 festival took place on 27–30 July and sold out in record time, 4 days after lineup had been announced on 6 February. Acts included Manic Street Preachers, Brian Wilson, Editors, Feeder, Stereophonics, Franz Ferdinand, Tinie Tempah Frightened Rabbit, Kate Nash, Slaves, Circa Waves, Honeyblood, Ardyn, Palace and Lethal Bizzle.

=== 2018 ===
The 2018 dates were revealed before the 2017 Festival had taken place and sold out as per previous years. Kendal Calling took place on 26–29 July with Catfish and the Bottlemen, Plan B and the Libertines headlining.

An unofficial Kendal Calling Facebook group raised £1,500 for local charities by selling custom festival wristbands. This amount was then matched by festival organisers, and £3,000 was split between three local charities previously supported by the festival. They were Fletcher's Fund, Brathay Trust, and Eden Valley Hospice.

=== 2019 ===
Kendal Calling 2019 took place on 25 to 28 July 2019. Headline acts included Courteeners, Doves, Nile Rogers & Chic, Manic Street Preachers, other notable acts included Tom Jones.

=== 2020 ===
Kendal Calling 2020 was due to take place from 30 July to 2 August 2020 and to celebrate its fifteenth year. The festival was cancelled due to the COVID-19 pandemic in the United Kingdom.

=== 2021 ===
Kendal Calling 2021 was also cancelled due to COVID-19, citing the lack of insurance scheme to cover financial losses if the event were to be cancelled for COVID-19-related reasons, and a delay in the release of guidance needed in order to properly implement biosecurity protocols.

=== 2022 ===
Kendal Calling 2022 took place from Thursday 28 July to Sunday 31 July. It was the first iteration of the festival since the start of the COVID-19 pandemic.

Thursday 28 July	Friday 29 July	Saturday 30 July	Sunday 31 July
Haçienda Classical; Sundara Karma; Orla Gartland; Red Rum Club; Alfie Templeman; Howling Rhythm DJs; K.O.G; TC & The Groove Family; Lazy Habits; Dubbul O	Supergrass; Craig David's TS5; Tom Grennan; The Vaccines; The Cribs; Joel Corry; The Slow Readers Club; Scouting for Girls; The Sherlocks; The Academic	Stereophonics; The Wombats; Hot Chip Megamix; Amy Macdonald; Declan McKenna; Sam Ryder; Sports Team; Andy C; Pale Waves; The Lottery Winners	Bastille (replaced The Streets); The Kooks; Sea Girls; Sophie Ellis-Bextor; Gabrielle; Ibibio Sound Machine; Faithless (DJ set); The Snuts; Chris Moyles; Elvana

=== 2023 ===
Kendal Calling 2023 took place from Thursday 27 July to Sunday 30 July.

Thursday 27 July	Friday 28 July	Saturday 29 July	Sunday 30 July
Nile Rodgers & Chic; Scouting for Girls; Black Honey; Gengahr; Rose Gray; TC & The Groove Family; Will & The People; The Kubricks; Bare Jams; Tricky Disco	Kasabian; The Lathums; Example; Annie Mac; Mel C; We Are Scientists; The Murder Capital; Wunderhorse; Lowes; Etta Marcus	Blossoms; Rick Astley; Confidence Man; Frank Turner; KT Tunstall; Happy Mondays; Circa Waves; The Lottery Winners; Kiefer Sutherland; Tim Burgess	Royal Blood; Kaiser Chiefs; The Amazons; Reverend & The Makers; The Enemy; Natalie Imbruglia; Sonique; The Hunna; Katy J Pearson; Professor Green

=== 2024 ===
Kendal Calling 2024 took place from Thursday 1 August to Sunday 4 August.

Thursday 27 July	Friday 28 July	Saturday 29 July	Sunday 30 July
Paul Heaton; Declan McKenna; The Hunna; Beth McCarthy; Harwicke Circus; The Allergies; The Covasettes; Freshly Squeezed; Tom McGuire & the Brassholes; Sold to the Sky	Noel Gallagher's High Flying Birds; Keane; The Snuts; CMAT; Katy B; Flowerovlove; The Pigeon Detectives; The K's; Lucy Spraggan; Pip Blom	The Streets; Sugababes; Kate Nash; The Lightning Seeds; Heather Small; Andrew Cushin; The Shapeshifters; Peace; The Royston Club; Russell Howard	Paolo Nutini; The Reytons; Feeder; Pale Waves; Royel Otis; The Lottery Winners; Red Rum Club; Sundara Karma; Temples; Antony Szmierek

=== 2025 ===
Kendal Calling 2025 took place from Thursday 31 July to Sunday 3 August.

Thursday 31 July	Friday 1 August	Saturday 2 August	Sunday 3 August
Kaiser Chiefs; Sophie Ellis-Bextor	Courteeners; The Wombats; The K's; Daniel Bedingfield; The Big Moon; The Academic; Fickle Friends; Tim Burgess	Fatboy Slim; Travis; The Lottery Winners; Reverend and the Makers; Scouting for Girls; The Royston Club; The Pigeon Detectives; Sports Team	The Prodigy; The Last Dinner Party; Skindred; Maxïmo Park; Jason Manford; Frank Turner & The Sleeping Souls; Red Rum Club; The Lancashire Hotpots; Alfie Templeman; Nieve Ella

=== 2026 ===
Kendal Calling 2026 took place from Thursday 30 July to Sunday 2 August.

Thursday 30 July	Friday 31 July	Saturday 1 August	Sunday 2 August
The Kooks; The Cribs; Vanessa Carlton; The Covasettes	Two Door Cinema Club; Scissor Sisters; The Vaccines; The Snuts; The Coral; Hard-Fi; Ash; Deaf Havana; The Lottery Winners; Black Honey; We Are Scientists	Biffy Clyro; The Libertines; Jamie Webster; Doves; Gabrielle; The Hunna; The Twang; The Futureheads	Wolf Alice; Primal Scream; The Lathums; Red Rum Club; Groove Armada DJ Set; Circa Waves; Florence Road; The Lancashire Hotpots
