= Disco Volador =

Studio album by The Orielles
- Released: 28 February 2020
- Genre: Rock, pop
- Label: Heavenly Recordings
- Producer: Marta Salogni

Disco Volador is a studio album by The Orielles, released by Heavenly Recordings on 28 February 2020. Developed in efforts to draw from broader genre influences, its music has been described as merging elements of indie pop, disco, samba, funk rock, jazz, psychedelia and new wave. Its title, the Spanish term for a frisbee, was intended to reflect the album's lyrical themes relating to escapism and human connection. Upon release, Disco Volador received generally favorable reviews from critics, with praise directed to the evolution of the band's sound, its themes and eclectic and varied nature of its genre influences, with some critiques directed at the originality of the album's sound and the impact of its production.

== Background and recording ==
Disco Volador was recorded by The Orielles, a Halifax, Nova Scotia band consisting of siblings Sidonie and Esmé Dee Hand-Halford, Henry Carlyle Wade and Alex Stephens. It is the sophomore release of the band following the 2018 album Silver Dollar Moment. The band drew from several genre influences, including disco music, bossa nova, jazz, psychedelia and acid house; also artists ABBA and Lenny Breau. The band stated that escapism, and "using dance music to escape", was a core theme of the album, with the 'disco volador', the Spanish translation of flying disc or frisbee, intended as a symbol of "feelings of flight and motion and the notion of human connectivity". Gutarist Henry Carlyle-Wade stated an aim to make the album's songs "more diverse from a chordal point of view" compared to the previous album, developing an interest in jazz chords, seventh chords, and pedal tones.

== Release and promotion ==
Disco Volador was announced by label Heavenly Recordings on 21 October 2019 with the release of a lead single, "Come Down On Jupiter. The single accompanied a music video directed by Rose Hendry, shot in Kennington. The band promoted the album with their first-ever North America tour in March 2020, including appearances in New York City for the New Colossus Festival, and in Austin, Texas for SXSW.

== Reception ==
Professional ratings
Review scores
Source	Rating
Allmusic	4/5
Clash	7/10
DIY	3.5
The Guardian	3/5
The Line of Best Fit	8/10
MusicOMH	3/5
PopMatters	7/10

According to review aggregator Metacritic, Disco Volador received "generally favorable" reviews from critics. Critics considered the album had an eclectic range of sounds; DIY wrote that the band "blend a ton of influences" to create a "vivid world of colour and flavor to get lost in", and The Line of Best Fit praised the transcendence of "feelings and moods, decades and textures, boundaries and expectations" in its music. Allmusic felt that the band "throw idea after idea into the mix and are able to pull them off each time". The album's lyrical themes were also generally praised, with PopMatters enjoying its "childlike fascination with space", and Clash praising the focus on "escaping the mundanity of the everyday, rewarding listeners that allow their imaginations to wander". Comparisons were made between the album and bands such as Lizzy Mercier Descloux, Slowdive, Stereolab and Yo La Tengo across tracks. Critics were divided on how these influences were reflected in the album, some viewed the album's sound as derivative; MusicOMH felt the band "struggle to stamp their own identity" on their influences, stating the tracks lacked originality. In contrast PopMatters felt the album "isn't overshadowed by its vast lineup of influences", considering it less stagnation than "music that's fresh and optimistic", Some critics also felt the music production lacked impact: MusicOMH finding it "placid" and "lacking vibrancy", and The Guardian writing that "the density of the production occasionally subsumes their appealing vocal melodies and fails to mask a lack of emotional punch".

== Track listing ==
Disco Volador track listing
No.	Title	Length
1.	"Come Down On Jupiter"	5:11
2.	"Rapid I"	4:00
3.	"Memoirs of Miso"	5:25
4.	"Bobbi's Second World"	3:22
5.	"Whilst the Flowers Look"	5:47
6.	"The Square Eyed Pack"	4:03
7.	"7th Dynamic Goo"	3:54
8.	"A Material Mistake"	3:26
9.	"Euro Borealis"	3:38
10.	"Space Samba (Disco Volador Theme)"	5:00

== Personnel ==
- The Orielles – writing, recording
- Marta Salogni – production, mixing
- Heba Kadry – mastering
- Raissa Pardini – artwork
