= Official Vinyl Albums Chart =

British record chart

The Official Vinyl Albums Chart is a weekly record chart in the United Kingdom. It is compiled by the Official Charts Company (OCC) on behalf of the music industry. It lists the top 40 most popular albums in the vinyl format each week. The chart, along with the corresponding Official Vinyl Singles Chart, was launched on 6 April 2015 to coincide with Record Store Day, and was introduced in response to the major rise in popularity of vinyl records, both songs and albums; 2014 saw 1.3 million vinyl albums sold in the UK for the first time since 1995.

Martin Talbot, chief executive of the Official Charts Company, said: "We're delighted to launch the UK's first Official Vinyl Albums and Official Vinyl Singles charts on OfficialCharts.com, to coincide with Record Store Day this coming weekend. With vinyl album sales up by almost 70% already this year, vinyl junkies could well have snapped up 2 million units by the end of this year – an extraordinary number, if you consider sales were one-tenth of that just six years ago. This growth underlines the continuing resurgence of this much-loved format, whether you're a fan of Arctic Monkeys, Noel Gallagher, Led Zeppelin or David Bowie."

On 12 April 2015, Future Hearts by All Time Low became the first number one on the Official Vinyl Albums Chart.

== Best-selling vinyl albums by year ==
Year	Album	Artist	Record label	Ref.
2011	The King of Limbs	Radiohead	XL	
2012	Coexist	The xx	Young Turks	
2013	AM	Arctic Monkeys	Domino	
2014	The Endless River	Pink Floyd	Parlophone	
2015	25	Adele	XL	
2016	Blackstar	David Bowie	RCA	
2017	÷	Ed Sheeran	Asylum	
2018	Tranquility Base Hotel & Casino	Arctic Monkeys	Domino	
2019	Why Me? Why Not.	Liam Gallagher	Warner	
2020	Rumours	Fleetwood Mac	WEA	
2021	Voyage	ABBA	Polar	
2022	Midnights	Taylor Swift	EMI	
2023	1989 (Taylor's Version)	Taylor Swift	EMI	
2024	The Tortured Poets Department	Taylor Swift	EMI	
2025	The Life of a Showgirl	Taylor Swift	EMI	

== See also ==
- List of Official Vinyl Albums Chart number ones of the 2010s
- List of Official Vinyl Albums Chart number ones of the 2020s
- List of Official Vinyl Singles Chart number ones of the 2010s
- List of Official Vinyl Singles Chart number ones of the 2020s
