= How's My Pop =

Hows My Pop
- Origin: Lancaster, Lancashire, England
- Genres: Indie Rock, Blues
- Years active: 2005–2010
- Past members: Andrew Raven; Chris Macneil; Matt Canty; Thomas Diffenthal

Hows My Pop were a four-piece, indie rock band from Lancaster, England.

== Career ==
The band formed late 2005 and after a few weeks of writing songs together they organised their first show in Lancaster. Soon after their first show they received radio coverage on BBC Radio Lancashire from DJ Sean Mcginty.

In the summer of 2006, Hows My Pop were invited to play the first ever Kendal Calling festival alongside such acts as Little Man Tate and British Sea Power.

Following a TV appearance on City Life Social on Channel M in 2006, they played shows at Dpercussion and in the City festivals in Manchester, and supported acts such as The View at The Night and Day Café, The Holloways and The Research.

Hows My Pop were chosen to play on the BBC Introducing stage at Glastonbury Festival in 2007. Shortly after this they went into the studio to record Am I Normal Yet?? which was unreleased until 2010.

The band went into a permanent hiatus following the release of On The Hop on the label Barnbox.

== Reunion ==
Hows My Pop performed a one-off gig at the Yorkshire House in Lancaster in December 2014.

== Discography ==
- On The Hop (2009)
- Am I Normal Yet?? (2010)
