= List of Official Vinyl Singles Chart number ones of the 2020s =

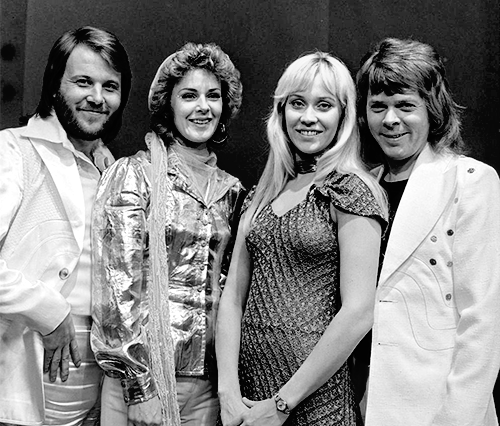
ABBA holds the record for the most number-one singles during the decade

The Official Vinyl Singles Chart is a weekly record chart compiled by the Official Charts Company (OCC) on behalf of the music industry in the United Kingdom. It lists the 40 most popular singles in the gramophone record (or "vinyl") format. This is a list of the singles which have been number one on the Official Vinyl Singles Chart in the 2020s.

== Number ones ==
Key
No.	nth single to top the Official Vinyl Singles Chart
re	Return of a single to number one
†	Best-selling vinyl single of the year

No.	Artist (Note: The artist, single, date of reaching number one and number of weeks at number one are those given by the OCC.)	Single	Record label (Note: The record labels are those given by the OCC.)	Reached number one (for the week ending)	Weeks at number one	Ref.
2020
197	Wham!	"Last Christmas"	RCA	26 December 2019	2	
198	Morrissey	"It's Over"	BMG	9 January 2020	1	
re	Wham!	"Last Christmas"	RCA	16 January 2020	1	
199	The Lovely Eggs	"This Decision"	The Lovely Eggs	23 January 2020	1	
200	Bombay Bicycle Club	"Eat, Sleep, Wake (Nothing but You)"	MMM	30 January 2020	1	
201	Harry Styles	"Lights Up"	Columbia	6 February 2020	1	
202	Paul Weller	"In Another Room"	Ghost Box	13 February 2020	1	
203	Pet Shop Boys	"Monkey Business"	x2	20 February 2020	1	
204	David Bowie	"Alabama Song"	Parlophone	27 February 2020	2	
205	Bastille	"Quarter Past Midnight"	Virgin	12 March 2020	1	
206	Noel Gallagher's High Flying Birds	"Blue Moon Rising"	Sony	19 March 2020	2	
207	The Weeknd	"Blinding Lights"	Republic	2 April 2020	1	
208	Pearl Jam	"Dance of the Clairvoyants"	EMI	9 April 2020	1	
209	Smoke Fairies	"Elevator"	Year Seven	16 April 2020	1	
210	Gerry Cinnamon	"Dark Days"	Little Runaway	23 April 2020	1	
211	Justin Bieber	"Yummy"	Def Jam	30 April 2020	1	
212	Pet Shop Boys	"I Don't Wanna"	x2	7 May 2020	1	
re	Blur	"Girls & Boys"	Food	14 May 2020	1	
213	Jamie xx	"I Don't Know"	Young Turks	21 May 2020	1	
re	The 1975	"Medicine"	Dirty Hit	28 May 2020	1	
214	Paul Weller	"Village"	Polydor	4 June 2020	1	
215	Def Leppard	"Let Me Be the One"	Mercury	11 June 2020	1	
re	Blur	"Girls & Boys"	Food	18 June 2020	1	
216	Fontaines D.C.	"A Hero's Death"	Partisan	25 June 2020	1	
217	Dermot Kennedy	"All My Friends"	Island	2 July 2020	1	
218	The Rolling Stones	"Living in a Ghost Town"	Polydor	9 July 2020	2	
219	DMA's	"Silver"	Infectious Music	23 July 2020	1	
220	Joy Division	"Love Will Tear Us Apart"	Rhino	30 July 2020	1	
re	Fontaines D.C.	"A Hero's Death"	Partisan	6 August 2020	1	
221	Mumford & Sons	"Forever"	Gentlemen of the Road/Island	13 August 2020	1	
222	The Slow Readers Club	"The Wait"	Modern Sky	20 August 2020	1	
223	Alice Cooper	"Don't Give Up"	earMUSIC	27 August 2020	1	
224	Queen + Adam Lambert	"You Are the Champions"	Virgin	3 September 2020	1	
225	U2	"11 O'Clock Tick Tock"	Island/UMC	10 September 2020	1	
226	Biffy Clyro	"The Modern Leper"	Atlantic	17 September 2020	1	
227	The Lathums	"All My Life"	Island	24 September 2020	1	
228	Billie Eilish	"My Future"	Interscope	1 October 2020	1	
229	Royal Blood	"Trouble's Coming"	Warner	8 October 2020	1	
230	New Order	"Blue Monday"	Rhino	15 October 2020	1	
231	Billie Eilish	"No Time to Die"	Interscope	22 October 2020	1	
232	The Damned	"Keep 'Em Alive"	Spinefarm	29 October 2020	1	
233	The Specials	"Gangsters"	Chrysalis	5 November 2020	1	
234	ABBA	"Lay All Your Love On Me"	Polar	12 November 2020	1	
235	Kylie Minogue	"Say Something"	BMG	19 November 2020	1	
236	New Order	"Be a Rebel"	Mute	26 November 2020	1	
237	Sleaford Mods featuring Billy Nomates	"Mork n Mindy"	Rough Trade	3 December 2020	1	
238	Orchestral Manoeuvres in the Dark	"Enola Gay"	UMC/Virgin	10 December 2020	1	
239	Coldplay	"Christmas Lights"	Parlophone	17 December 2020	1	
240	Blossoms	"Christmas Eve (Soul Purpose)"	EMI	24 December 2020	1	
241	Liam Gallagher	"All You're Dreaming Of" †	Warner	31 December 2020	1	
2021
242	Katy Perry	"Daisies"	Virgin	7 January 2021	1	
re	Liam Gallagher	"All You're Dreaming Of"	Warner	14 January 2021	1	
243	The Lathums	"I See Your Ghost"	Island	21 January 2021	1	
244	David Bowie	"Mother"	Parlophone	28 January 2021	1	
245	Royal Blood	"Typhoons"	Warner	4 February 2021	1	
246	Harry Styles	"Watermelon Sugar"	Columbia	11 February 2021	2	
247	JC Stewart	"Break My Heart"	Warner	25 February 2021	1	
248	David Bowie and Morrissey	"Cosmic Dancer"	Rhino	4 March 2021	1	
249	Yard Act	"Dark Days"	Zen Fc	11 March 2021	1	
250	Burial/Four Tet/Thom Yorke	"Her Revolution"	XL	18 March 2021	1	
251	The Horrors	"Lout"	Virgin	25 March 2021	1	
252	Ben Howard	"What A Day"	Island	1 April 2021	1	
253	Hayley Williams	"Simmer"	Atlantic	8 April 2021	1	
254	Helloween	"Skyfall"	Nuclear Blast	15 April 2021	1	
254	Black Midi	"John L"	Rough Trade	22 April 2021	1	
255	Goldie	"Inner City Life"	London Music Stream	29 April 2021	1	
256	Flowered Up	"Weekender"	Heavenly	6 May 2021	1	
257	Kylie Minogue and Dua Lipa	"Real Groove"	BMG	13 May 2021	1	
258	Tom Walker	"Wait for You"	Relentless	20 May 2021	1	
258	Phoebe Bridgers	"Kyoto"	Dead Oceans	27 May 2021	1	
259	Burial	"Chemz"	Hyperdub	3 June 2021	1	
260	David Bowie	"The Prettiest Star"	Parlophone	10 June 2021	1	
261	The Specials	"Ghost Town" †	2 Tone	17 June 2021	1	
262	U2	"Fire"	Island	24 June 2021	1	
263	Lounge Society	"Burn the Heather"	Speedy Underground	1 July 2021	1	
264	Royal Blood	"Limbo"	Warner	8 July 2021	1	
265	Jon Hopkins	"Dawn Chorus"	Domino	15 July 2021	1	
266	Lovely Eggs featuring Iggy Pop	"I Moron"	Egg	22 July 2021	1	
267	Jerry Dammers	"At the Home Organ - Demo's 1980 - 1982"	Chrysalis	29 July 2021	1	
268	Paul Weller	"Cosmic Fringes"	Polydor	5 August 2021	1	
269	White Demin	"Crystal Bullets"	English Mallard	12 August 2021	1	
270	Kim Wilde and Boy George	"Shine On"	Cherry Red	19 August 2021	1	
271	Fontaines D.C.	"Televised Mind"	Partisan	26 August 2021	1	
272	Rick Astley	"Never Gonna Give You Up"	RCA	2 September 2021	1	
273	Spice Girls	"Wannabe"	Virgin	9 September 2021	1	
274	ABBA	"I Still Have Faith in You"	Polar	16 September 2021	2	
275	Billy Idol	"Rita Hayworth"	BMG	30 September 2021	1	
276	DJ Shadow	"The Number Song"	A&M	7 October 2021	1	
277	Pastel	"Deeper than Holy"	Spirit of Spike Island	14 October 2021	1	
278	DMA's	"1 Way"	Infectious Music	21 October 2021	1	
279	Johnny Marr	"Spirit Power and Soul"	BMG	28 October 2021	1	
280	Biffy Clyro	"Errors in the History of God"	14th Floor	4 November 2021	1	
281	Marina	"Purge the Poison"	Atlantic	11 November 2021	1	
282	Sonic Youth and the Pastels	"Play The New York Dolls"	Glass Modern	18 November 2021	1	
283	Dry Cleaning	"Tascam Tapes"	4AD	25 November 2021	1	
284	Ringo Starr	"Change the World"	UMC	2 December 2021	1	
285	U2	"Gloria"	Island	9 December 2021	1	
286	Declan McKenna	"British Bombs"	Sony Music	16 December 2021	1	
287	Saint Etienne	"A Kiss Like This"	Heavenly	23 December 2021	1	
288	Johnny Marr	"Lightning People"	BMG	30 December 2021	1	
2022
289	Ozzy Osbourne and Lemmy	"Hellraiser"	Epic	6 January 2022	1	
290	Sam Fender	"Seventeen Going Under"	Polydor	13 January 2022	1	
re	Ozzy Osbourne and Lemmy	"Hellraiser"	Epic	20 January 2022	1	
291	Brooke Combe	"Are You With Me"	Island	27 January 2022	1	
292	Sufjan Stevens/De Augustine	"Back to Oz"	Asthmatic Kitty	3 February 2022	1	
293	Dry Cleaning	"Unsmart Lady"	4AD	10 February 2022	1	
294	Ghost	"Hunter's Moon"	Loma Vista	17 February 2022	1	
295	Frank Turner	"A Wave Across a Bay"	Polydor	24 February 2022	1	
re	Yard Act	"Dark Days"	Zen Fc	3 March 2022	1	
296	Shakespears Sister	"Stay"	London	10 March 2022	1	
297	Arab Strap	"Aphelion"	Rock Action	17 March 2022	1	
298	The Mysterines	"Under Your Skin"	Fiction	24 March 2022	1	
299	Alfa Mist	"First Light"	Anti	31 March 2022	1	
300	Placebo	"Beautiful James"	So Recordings	7 April 2022	1	
301	Wet Leg	"Chaise Longue"	Domino	14 April 2022	1	
302	Andy Partridge	"SeeSaw"	Ape House	21 April 2022	1	
303	The Wedding Present	"Monochrome"	Scopitones	28 April 2022	1	
304	Taylor Swift	"The Lakes"	EMI	5 May 2022	1	
305	Noel Gallagher's High Flying Birds	"We're Gonna Get There in the End"	Sour Mash	12 May 2022	2	
306	Marina	"Venus Fly Trap"	Atlantic	26 May 2022	1	
307	The Clash	"Rock the Casbah"	Columbia	2 June 2022	1	
308	Benefits	"Flag"	Invada	9 June 2022	1	
309	Sex Pistols	"God Save the Queen"	Virgin	16 June 2022	1	
310	Richard Ashcroft	"C'mon People (We're Making It Now)"	BMG	23 June 2022	1	
311	Suggs and Paul Weller	"Ooh Do U Fink U R"	BMG	30 June 2022	2	
312	Paolo Nutini	"Through the Echoes"	Atlantic	14 July 2022	1	
313	The Mysterines	"Life's a Bitch (But I Like It So Much)"	Fiction	21 July 2022	1	
314	Pink Floyd featuring Andriy Khlyvnyuk	"Hey, Hey, Rise Up!"	Rhino	28 July 2022	3	
315	Kylie Minogue and Jason Donovan	"Especially for You"	BMG	18 August 2022	1	
re	Arab Strap	"Aphelion"	Rock Action	25 August 2022	1	
316	BDRMM	"Port"	Sonic Cathedral	1 September 2022	1	
317	Various	"Now Yearbook 1983 - 1984"	EMI/Universal	8 September 2022	1	
318	Harry Styles	"Late Night Talking"	Columbia	15 September 2022	1	
319	Lewis Capaldi	"Forget Me"	EMI	22 September 2022	1	
320	CVC	"Docking the Pay"	CVC	29 September 2022	1	
321	Killing Joke	"Lord of Chaos"	Spinefarm	6 October 2022	1	
322	Inhaler	"These Are the Days"	Polydor	13 October 2022	1	
323	Stone Foundation	"Now That You Want Me Back"	100 Percent	20 October 2022	1	
324	Gideon	"Ritmo"	Homo-Centric	27 October 2022	1	
325	Madonna	"Erotica"	Rhino	3 November 2022	1	
326	Muse	"You Make Me Feel Like It's Halloween"	Warner	10 November 2022	1	
327	The Prodigy	"Firestarter"	XL	17 November 2022	1	
328	Soft Cell and Pet Shop Boys	"Purple Zone"	BMG	24 November 2022	1	
329	Queen	"Face It Alone"	EMI	1 December 2022	1	
330	The Specials	"Friday Night, Saturday Morning"	Chrysalis	8 December 2022	1	
331	Baddiel, Skinner and The Lightning Seeds	"3 Lions"	Epic	15 December 2022	1	
332	Girls Aloud	"Sound of the Underground"	Polydor	22 December 2022	1	
re	ABBA	"Happy New Year"	Polar	29 December 2022	1	
2023
re	The Specials	"Ghost Town"	2 Tone	5 January 2023	1	
333	Loyle Carner featuring John Agard	"Georgetown"	EMI	12 January 2023	1	
334	The Cribs	"Happy In Town"	Kill Rock Stars	19 January 2023	1	
re	The Specials	"Ghost Town"	2 Tone	26 January 2023	1	
335	LF System	"Hungry (For Love)"	Warner	2 February 2023	1	
336	New Order	"The Perfect Kiss"	Factory	9 February 2023	1	
337	Spiritbox	"Rotoscope"	Rise	16 February 2023	1	
338	Jim Bob	"Beach Ready Boys"	Cherry Red	23 February 2023	1	
339	Inhaler	"Valentine"	Polydor	2 March 2023	1	
340	Roisin Murphy and DJ Koze	"Can't Replicate"	Ninja Tune	9 March 2023	1	
341	Dodie	"Hot Mess"	Doddleoddle	16 March 2023	1	
342	Ghost	"Kiss the Go-Goat"	Loma Vista	23 March 2023	1	
343	John	"Theme From New Bond Junior"	Brace Yourself	30 March 2023	1	
344	Fontaines D.C.	"Cello Song"	Chrysalis	6 April 2023	1	
345	Public Image Ltd	"Hawaii"	Pil Official	13 April 2023	1	
re	New Order	"Blue Monday"	Rhino	20 April 2023	1	
346	Niall Horan	"Heaven"	Capitol	27 April 2023	1	
347	Sam Fender	"Wild Grey Ocean"	Polydor	4 May 2023	1	
348	The Chemical Brothers	"No Reason"	EMI	11 May 2023	1	
349	Deary	"Fairground"	Sonic Cathedral	18 May 2023	1	
350	Everything But the Girl	"Nothing Left to Lose"	Buzzin' Fly	25 May 2023	1	
351	ABBA	"Ring Ring"	Polar Music	1 June 2023	1	
351	T. Rex	"20th Century Boy"	Crimson	8 June 2023	1	
352	Lewis Capaldi	"Wish You the Best"	Vertigo	15 June 2023	1	
353	Sex Pistols	"Anarchy in the U.K."	EMI	22 June 2023	1	
354	Style Council	"Our Favorite Shop"	Polydor	29 June 2023	1	
355	S Club	"Don't Stop Movin'"	Polydor	6 July 2023	1	
356	Olivia Rodrigo	"Vampire"	Geffen	13 July 2023	1	
357	Suede	"The Drowners"	Nude	20 July 2023	1	
358	The Last Dinner Party	"Nothing Matters"	Island	27 July 2023	1	
359	Kode 9	"Infirmary"	Fabric	3 August 2023	1	
360	Aphex Twin	"Blackbox Life Recorder 21f"	Warp	10 August 2023	1	
361	Sex Pistols	"Holidays in the Sun"	Virgin	17 August 2023	2	
362	Mac Miller	"NPR Music Tiny Concert"	Parlophone	31 August 2023	1	
363	Yard Act	"The Trench Coat Museum"	Zen Fc	7 September 2023	1	
364	Chase & Status featuring Bou, Irah, Flowdan and Trigga and Takura	"Baddadan"	EMI	14 September 2023	1	
365	Rolling Stones	"Angry"	Polydor	21 September 2023	2	
366	Marc Almond	"My Death"	Cherry Red	5 October 2023	1	
367	The Sex Pistols	"Pretty Vacant"	Universal	12 October 2023	1	
368	Beabadoobee	"Glue Song"	Dirty Hit	19 October 2023	1	
369	Boygenius	"Black Hole"	Interscope	26 October 2023	1	
370	Richard Hawley	"Not the Only Road"	BMG	2 November 2023	1	
371	OMD	"Bauhaus Staircase"	100 Percent	9 November 2023	1	
372	The Beatles	"Now and Then"	Apple Corps	16 November 2023	5	
373	Elton John	"Step Into Christmas"	Mercury	21 December 2023	1	
re	Wham!	"Last Christmas"	Sony	28 December 2023	1	
2024
374	Billie Eilish	"TV"	Polydor	4 January 2024	1	
375	Dua Lipa	"Houdini"	Warner Records	11 January 2024	1	
376	Liam Gallagher and John Squire	"Just Another Rainbow"	Warner Records	18 January 2024	1	
377	Ariana Grande	"Yes, And?"	Republic	25 January 2024	1	
378	Noah Kahan	"Stick Season"	Republic	1 February 2024	1	
379	The Lumineers	"Ho Hey"	Decca	8 February 2024	1	
380	Billy Joel	"Turn the Lights Back On"	Columbia	15 February 2024	1	
381	Sophie Ellis-Bextor	"Murder on the Dancefloor"	Polydor	22 February 2024	1	
382	Dua Lipa	"Training Season"	Warner	29 February 2024	1	
re	The Last Dinner Party	"Nothing Matters"	Island	7 March 2024	1	
383	Shed Seven	"Let's Go Dancing"	Cooking Vinyl	14 March 2024	1	
384	Billie Eilish	"What Was I Made For?"	Interscope	21 March 2024	1	
385	Mark Knopfler's Guitar Heroes	"Going Home: Theme of the Local Hero"	BMG	28 March 2024	1	
386	Warpaint	"Common Blue"	Rough Trade	4 April 2024	1	
387	Eric Cantona	"I Love You So Much"	Decca	11 April 2024	1	
388	ABBA	"Waterloo"	Polydor	18 April 2024	1	
389	Oasis	"Supersonic"	Big Brother	25 April 2024	1	
390	Olivia Rodrigo	"Stick Season"	Polydor	2 May 2024	1	
391	OMD	"Kleptocracy"	100 Percent	9 May 2024	1	
392	Perrie	"Forget About Us"	Columbia	16 May 2024	1	
393	Olly Alexander	"Dizzy"	Polydor	23 May 2024	1	
394	Kneecap	"Better Way to Live"	Heavenly	30 May 2024	1	
395	Amyl and the Sniffers	"U Should Not Be Doing That"	Rough Trade	6 June 2024	1	
396	Portishead	"Sour Times"	Go Beat	13 June 2024	1	
397	Raye	"Genesis"	Human Re Sources	20 June 2024	1	
398	Lil Peep	"Star Shopping"	Urban Empire	27 June 2024	1	
399	Wolf Alice	"Creature Songs"	Dirty Hit	4 July 2024	1	
400	Chappell Roan	"Good Luck, Babe!"	Island	11 July 2024	1	
401	Noah Kahan	"Dial Drunk"	Republic	18 July 2024	1	
402	The Streets	"Turn the Page"	Locked On	25 July 2024	1	
403	Last Dinner Party	"Sinner"	Island	1 August 2024	1	
404	Ariana Grande	"We Can't Be Friends (Wait for Your Love)"	Republic	8 August 2024	1	
405	Def Leppard	"Just Like 73"	Universal	15 August 2024	1	
406	Kylie Minogue,Bebe Rexha and Tove Lo	"My Oh My"	BMG	22 August 2024	1	
re	Chappell Roan	"Good Luck, Babe!"	Island	29 August 2024	1	
407	Sabrina Carpenter	"Please Please Please"	Island	5 September 2024	1	
408	The The	"Some Days i Drink My Coffee by the Grave"	Earmusic	12 September 2024	1	
409	Quavo and Lana Del Rey	"Tough"	Motown/Polydor/Quality Control	19 September 2024	1	
410	JADE	"Angel of My Dreams"	RCA	26 September 2024	1	
411	Toyah	"Rebel Run"	Cherry Red	3 October 2024	1	
412	Chase & Status and Stormzy	"Backbone"	0207 Records/EMI/Merky	10 October 2024	1	
re	Olivia Rodrigo	"Vampire"	Geffen	17 October 2024	1	
413	Stone Foundation	"Fix You Up"	100 Percent	24 October 2024	1	
414	George Michael	"Careless Whisper"	Epic	31 October 2024	1	
415	Blessed Madonna/Kylie Minogue	"Edge of Saturday Night"	The Vinyl Factory	7 November 2024	1	
415	Showaddywaddy	"Hey Mister Christmas"	DMG TV	14 November 2024	1	
416	Kylie Minogue	"Lights Camera Action"	BMG	21 November 2024	1	
417	Olivia Rodrigo	"Bad Idea Right?"	Geffen	28 November 2024	1	
418	The Cure	"A Fragile Thing"	Polydor	5 December 2024	1	
419	Band Aid	"Do They Know It's Christmas?"	Mercury	12 December 2024	1	
420	Sabrina Carpenter	"Nonsense"	Polydor	19 December 2024	1	
re	Wham!	"Last Christmas"	RCA	26 December 2024	2	
2025
421	Sam Fender	"People Watching"	Polydor	9 January 2025	1	
re	Sabrina Carpenter	"Please Please Please"	Island	16 January 2025	1	
422	Chappell Roan	"Pink Pony Club"	Island	23 January 2025	1	
423	Lola Young	"Messy"	Island	30 January 2025	1	
424	Niall Horan	"This Town"	Capitol	6 February 2025	1	
re	Lola Young	"Messy"	Island	13 February 2025	1	
425	Gracie Abrams	"That's So True"	Interscope	20 February 2025	1	
426	Manic Street Preachers	"Let the Light Return"	Columbia	27 February 2025	1	
427	Oasis	"Whatever"	Big Brother	6 March 2025	3	
428	JADE	"FUFN (Fuck You for Now)"	RCA	27 March 2025	1	

=== By record label ===
As of the week ending 27 March 2025, Twenty Nine record labels have topped the chart for at least three weeks.

Record label	Number-one singles	Weeks at number one
Polydor	21	22
BMG	14	15
Island	14	18
Warner	10	11
EMI	11	11
Virgin	7	8
Atlantic	5	5
Rhino	5	8
Columbia	7	8
Apple Corps	1	5
Republic	5	5
Interscope	5	5
Chrysalis	4	4
Polar	4	4
Parlophone	4	4
Rough Trade	4	4
RCA	4	7
100 Percent	4	4
Cherry Red	4	4
Epic	3	4
Big Brother	2	4
Partisan	2	3
2 Tone	1	3
Zen Fc	2	3
Heavenly	3	3
Dirty Hit	3	3
Geffen	2	3
Mercury	3	3

=== By artist ===
As of the week ending 27 March 2025, Twenty seven artists topped the chart for at least three weeks.

Artist	Number-one singles	Weeks at number one
ABBA	5	6
Kylie Minogue	6	6
Wham!	1	6
David Bowie	4	5
Paul Weller	4	5
Sex Pistols	4	5
The Beatles	1	5
Noel Gallagher's High Flying Birds	2	4
Fontaines D.C.	3	4
The Specials	2	4
New Order	3	4
Billie Eilish	4	4
Olivia Rodrigo	3	4
Oasis	2	4
Harry Styles	2	3
Royal Blood	3	3
Andriy Khlyvnyuk (as featuring)	1	3
Pink Floyd	1	3
Harry Styles	3	3
Pet Shop Boys	3	3
Yard Act	2	3
Liam Gallagher	2	3
U2	3	3
The Last Dinner Party	2	3
Sam Fender	3	3
Sabrina Carpenter	2	3
Chappell Roan	2	3

== See also ==
- List of Official Vinyl Singles Chart number ones of the 2010s
- List of Official Vinyl Albums Chart number ones of the 2010s
- List of Official Vinyl Albums Chart number ones of the 2020s
