= The Covasettes =

A Manchester-based band

- The Covasettes in 2023

Background information
- Origin: Manchester, Greater Manchester, England
- Genres: Indie pop; indie rock
- Years active: 2017–present
- Label: LAB Records
- Members: Matt Buckley; Chris Buxton; Matt Hewlett; Jamie McIntyre; Lizzie Wenninger
- Website: thecovasettes.com

The Covasettes are an indie pop band formed in Manchester in 2017. The band consists of Chris Buxton on lead vocals, Jamie McIntyre on bass, Matt Hewlett on lead guitar, Matt Buckley on drums, and Lizzie Wenninger who joined in 2026 as keyboardist and violinist. The band released their debut album Honeymoon Forever in 2026.

== History ==
They formed in 2017, having met at university, and in 2026 achieved the number one spot on downloads. They gained millions of streams on platforms like Spotify and have earned heavy rotation on BBC Radio 1 and BBC Radio 5 Live. They have support from Fearne Cotton and Scott Mills. Their debut single, "This Feeling" came out in 2017 and their debut album Honeymoon Forever in 2026 along with a deluxe version. The title track, the last on the album, was released the same day. They took part in Kendal Calling 2024. In 2025, they appeared on Manchester: Unplugged, a StreamGM presentation highlighting the music of the city. They performed "Such a Dream" from the forthcoming album. In 2026, they were booked to play at The Ritz in Manchester when the Foo Fighters announced a surprise gig as part of the Take Cover tour. The latter were set to play at 11pm so the Covasettes, and their supporting act, moved their set to an earlier time. They invited Dave Grohl onstage for a song. Later in the same year they supported Rick Astley at Scarborough Open Air Theatre.

Despite a large following on Spotify, the band members still have regular jobs. Buxton is a solicitor, and McIntyre produces the band and other acts at Little Brook Studio.

== Discography ==
Type	Name	Year	Notes
Single	This Feeling	2017	
Single	Wondering Why	2018	
Single	Top Drawer	2018	
Single	Wild	2018	
Single	Like You	2019	b/w She Is
EP	It's Always Sunny Above the Clouds	2019	Twit Twoo You & I Let's Go; Fine Lines
Single	Spin	2019	b/w Irate
Single	Be Mine	2020	b/w Off My Mind
Single	Modern Rapunzel	2021	
Single	Watching All the Good Ones Go	2021	
Single	Sun Struck	2021	
EP	The Cova Guide to Sunset Vibes	2021	Sun Struck One Track Mind; By My Side; Sink or Swim
Single	Big Dreamer	2022	
Single	Plastic Gold	2022	
Single	Wave	2022	
Single	Duvet Thief	2023	
Single	Say What You See	2023	b/w Duvet Thief
Single	The Memory Chaser	2023	b/w Say what You See and Duvet Thief
EP	What's Lost Is Ours to Find	2023	Say what You See Duvet Thief; Heart & Soul; Sung; The Memory Chaser
Single	One Tear at a Time	2024	
Single	Love In Polaroid	2024	
Single	Step Two	2024	b/w Love In Polaroid
Single	Rebound	2025	
Single	Such A Dream	2025	
Single	What a Rush	2025	
Single	Watching You	2026	
Single	Honeymoon Forever	2026	
Album	Honeymoon Forever	2026	
