= Silver Dollar Moment =

Studio album by The Orielles
- Released: 16 February 2018
- Studio: Eve Studio, Stockport
- Genre: Indie pop; indie rock
- Length: 45:24
- Label: Heavenly
- Producer: Marta Salogni

The Orielles chronology
Silver Dollar Moment (2018)	Disco Volador (2020)

Singles from Silver Dollar Moment
- 1. "I Only Bought It For The Bottle" Released: 24 May 2017; 2. "Let Your Dogtooth Grow" Released: 24 October 2017; 3. "Blue Suitcase" Released: 16 January 2018

Professional ratings
Aggregate scores
Source	Rating
AnyDecentMusic?	7.2/10
Metacritic	77/100
Review scores
Source	Rating
The 405	7.5/20
AllMusic	4.5/5 stars
Clash	8/10
DIY	3/5 stars
Drowned in Sound	6/10
The Guardian	4/5 stars
The Line of Best Fit	7.5/10
Loud and Quiet	7/10
Louder Than War	8/10

Silver Dollar Moment is the debut studio album by English indie rock band The Orielles. It was released on 16 February 2018, under Heavenly Recordings.

== Release ==
On 24 May 2017, The Orielles released the first single from the album, "I Only Bought It For The Bottle".

The second single "Let Your Dogtooth Grow" was released on 24 October 2017. The music video to the single was released on 23 November 2017, and directed by Sam Boullier and shot in Manchester.

On 23 November 2017, the band announced the release of their debut album.

The third single "Blue Suitcase" was released on 16 January 2018. The band explained the single "is a track that was mostly written over the last few days of summer, inspired by events, discussions and ‘philosophical’ musings that took place in the studio during the recording of the album."

== Critical reception ==
Silver Dollar Moment was met with "generally favorable" reviews from critics. At Metacritic, which assigns a weighted average rating out of 100 to reviews from mainstream publications, this release received an average score of 77, based on 12 reviews. Aggregator Album of the Year gave the release a 75 out of 100 based on a critical consensus of 16 reviews.

Tim Sendra from AllMusic said of the album: "With a happily loose rhythm section, alternately shimmering and biting guitar, groovy keyboards, and songs that bob and weave like flyweight boxers, the sound they get on their debut album, Silver Dollar Moment, is fully formed and more impressively together than any baggy band bar. Each song is a perfectly constructed sonic treat, with the band and producer Marta Salongi never adding too much to the arrangements while still slipping in interesting little bits like synth drums, digitally warped guitars, and vocal harmonies here and there to keep listeners on their toes and dancing"

=== Accolades ===
Accolades for Silver Dollar Moment
Publication	Accolade	Rank
AllMusic	AllMusic's Best Albums of 2018	N/A
AllMusic	AllMusic's Best Pop and Indie Rock Albums of 2018	N/A
BBC Radio 6 Music	BBC Radio 6 Music's Top 10 Albums of 2018	9
Gigwise	Gigwise's Top 51 Albums of 2018	41
Piccadilly Records	Piccadilly Records' Top 100 Albums of 2018	16
Q	Q's Top 50 Albums of 2018	50
Rough Trade	Rough Trade's Top 100 Albums of 2018	16

== Track listing ==
Silver Dollar Moment track listing
No.	Title	Writer(s)	Length
1.	"Mango"	Esme Hand-Halford; Sidonie Hand-Halford	3:08
2.	"Old Stuff New Glass"	Esme Hand-Halford	4:37
3.	"Sunflower Seeds"	Esme Hand-Halford	5:04
4.	"Let Your Dogtooth Grow"	Esme Hand-Halford	4:00
5.	"Liminal Spaces"	Esme Hand-Halford	5:22
6.	"The Sound of Liminal Spaces"	Esme Hand-Halford	1:26
7.	"I Only Bought It for the Bottle"	Esme Hand-Halford; Sidonie Hand-Halford	3:07
8.	"Henry's Pocket"	Esme Hand-Halford	4:16
9.	"48%"	Esme Hand-Halford	2:42
10.	"Borrachero Tree"	Esme Hand-Halford	2:35
11.	"Snaps"	Esme Hand-Halford	3:54
12.	"Blue Suitcase (Disco Wrist)"	Esme Hand-Halford	5:13

== Personnel ==
Musicians

- Esme Hand-Halford – vocals, drums, bass
- Sidonie Hand-Halford – vocals, drums
- Henry Carlyle Wade – piano, guitar, backing vocals
- Lucy Power – flute

Production

- Marta Salogni – producer, engineer

== Charts ==
Chart performance for Silver Dollar Moment
Chart (2018)	Peak position
Scottish Albums (OCC)	32
UK Albums (OCC)	92
UK Independent Albums (OCC)	10
