= List of Official Vinyl Albums Chart number ones of the 2010s =

The Official Vinyl Albums Chart is a weekly record chart compiled by the Official Charts Company (OCC) on behalf of the music industry in the United Kingdom since April 2015. It lists the 40 most popular albums in the gramophone record (or "vinyl") format. This is a list of the albums which reached number one on the Official Vinyl Albums Chart in the 2010s.

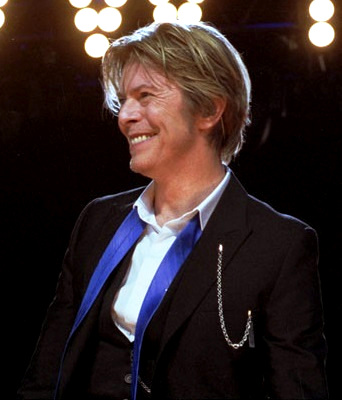
David Bowie holds the record for the most number-one albums during the decade

== Number ones ==
Key
No.	nth album to top the Official Vinyl Albums Chart
re	Return of an album to number one
†	Best-selling vinyl album of the year
‡	Best-selling vinyl album of the decade

No.	Artist (Note: The artist, album, date of reaching number one and number of weeks at number one are those given by the OCC.)	Album	Record label (Note: The record labels are those given by the OCC.)	Reached number one (for the week ending)	Weeks at number one	Ref.
2015
1	Sufjan Stevens	Carrie & Lowell	Asthmatic Kitty	5 April 2015	1	
2	All Time Low	Future Hearts	Hopeless	12 April 2015	1	
3	Manic Street Preachers	The Holy Bible 20	Sony	19 April 2015	1	
4	Alabama Shakes	Sound and Color	ATO	26 April 2015	1	
5	Blur	The Magic Whip	Parlophone	3 May 2015	1	
6	Mumford & Sons	Wilder Mind	Gentlemen of the Road	10 May 2015	1	
7	Róisín Murphy	Hairless Toys	Play It Again Sam	17 May 2015	1	
8	Paul Weller	Saturns Pattern	Parlophone	24 May 2015	1	
9	The Vaccines	English Graffiti	Columbia	31 May 2015	1	
10	Jamie XX	In Colour	Young Turks	7 June 2015	1	
11	Muse	Drones	Helium 3/Warner Bros	14 June 2015	1	
12	The Stone Roses	The Stone Roses	Silvertone	21 June 2015	1	
13	Wolf Alice	My Love Is Cool	Dirty Hit	28 June 2015	1	
14	Joy Division	Unknown Pleasures	Rhino	5 July 2015	1	
15	Lucy Rose	Work It Out	Columbia	12 July 2015	1	
16	Four Tet	Morning/Evening	Text	19 July 2015	1	
17	Tame Impala	Currents	Fiction	26 July 2015	1	
18	Roger Waters	Amused to Death	Columbia	6 August 2015	1	
19	Led Zeppelin	Presence	Rhino	13 August 2015	1	
20	Frank Turner	Positive Songs for Negative People	Polydor	20 August 2015	1	
21	Frank Carter & The Rattlesnakes	Blossom	International Death Cult	27 August 2015	1	
22	AFX	Orphaned Deejay Selek 2006–08	Warp	3 September 2015	1	
23	Foals	What Went Down	Warner	10 September 2015	1	
24	Iron Maiden	The Book of Souls	Parlophone	17 September 2015	1	
25	The Libertines	Anthems for Doomed Youth	EMI	24 September 2015	1	
26	David Gilmour	Rattle That Lock	Columbia	1 October 2015	1	
27	Noel Gallagher's High Flying Birds	Where the City Meets the Sky – Chasing Yesterday: The Remixes	Sour Mash	8 October 2015	1	
28	Editors	In Dream	Play It Again Sam	15 October 2015	1	
29	John Grant	Grey Tickles, Black Pressure	Bella Union	22 October 2015	1	
30	Nothing but Thieves	Nothing but Thieves	RCA	29 October 2015	1	
31	Joanna Newsom	Divers	Drag City	5 November 2015	1	
32	Elvis Presley	If I Can Dream	Sony	12 November 2015	2	
33	Jeff Lynne's ELO	Alone in the Universe	RCA	26 November 2015	1	
34	Adele	25 †	XL	3 December 2015	2	
35	Coldplay	A Head Full of Dreams	Parlophone	17 December 2015	1	
re	Adele	25 †	XL	24 December 2015	2	
2016
36	Amy Winehouse	Back to Black	Island	7 January 2016	2	
37	David Bowie	Blackstar †	RCA	21 January 2016	6	
38	Foo Fighters	Saint Cecilia	RCA	3 March 2016	1	
39	The 1975	I Like It When You Sleep, for You Are So Beautiful yet So Unaware of It	Dirty Hit/Polydor	10 March 2016	1	
40	The Coral	Distance Inbetween	Ignition	17 March 2016	1	
41	Jeff Buckley	You and I	Columbia/Legacy	24 March 2016	1	
42	Iggy Pop	Post Pop Depression	Caroline/IGHO	31 March 2016	1	
re	Amy Winehouse	Back to Black	Island	7 April 2016	1	
43	Last Shadow Puppets	Everything You've Come to Expect	Domino	14 April 2016	1	
44	Deftones	Gore	Reprise	21 April 2016	1	
45	David Bowie	The Man Who Sold the World	Simply Vinyl	28 April 2016	1	
re	Amy Winehouse	Back to Black	Island	5 May 2016	1	
46	Prince	Purple Rain	Rhino	12 May 2016	3	
47	David Bowie	Changesonebowie	Parlophone	2 June 2016	1	
48	Catfish and the Bottlemen	The Ride	Island	9 June 2016	1	
49	John Williams	Star Wars: Episode IV – A New Hope	Sony Classical	16 June 2016	1	
50	Rival Sons	Hollow Bones	Earache	23 June 2016	1	
51	Radiohead	A Moon Shaped Pool	XL	30 June 2016	2	
52	Blink-182	California	BMG	14 July 2016	1	
53	Biffy Clyro	Ellipsis	14th Floor	21 July 2016	1	
54	Michael Kiwanuka	Love & Hate	Polydor	28 July 2016	1	
55	Bear's Den	Red Earth & Pouring Rain	Communion	4 August 2016	1	
re	Radiohead	A Moon Shaped Pool	XL	11 August 2016	1	
56	Blossoms	Blossoms	EMI	18 August 2016	1	
57	John Williams	Star Wars: The Empire Strikes Back	Sony Classical	25 August 2016	1	
58	Ryley Walker	Golden Sings That Have Been Sung	Dead Oceans	1 September 2016	1	
59	De La Soul	and the Anonymous Nobody...	AOI	8 September 2016	1	
60	Jamie T	Trick	Virgin	15 September 2016	1	
61	Nick Cave and the Bad Seeds	Skeleton Tree	Bad Seed	22 September 2016	1	
62	Led Zeppelin	The Complete BBC Sessions	Rhino	29 September 2016	1	
63	Bruce Springsteen	Chapter and Verse	Columbia	6 October 2016	1	
re	Radiohead	A Moon Shaped Pool	XL	13 October 2016	1	
64	Green Day	Revolution Radio	Reprise	20 October 2016	1	
65	Oasis	Be Here Now	Big Brother	27 October 2016	1	
66	Original Cast Recording	Lazarus	Columbia	3 November 2016	1	
67	Courteeners	Mapping the Rendezvous	Ignition	10 November 2016	1	
68	Pink Floyd	The Dark Side of the Moon	Rhino	17 November 2016	1	
69	Original Soundtrack	Trainspotting	Rhino	24 November 2016	1	
70	Metallica	Hardwired... to Self-Destruct	Blackened/Vertigo	1 December 2016	1	
71	Kate Bush	Before the Dawn	Noble & Brite	8 December 2016	1	
72	Elvis Presley	The Wonder of You	Legacy/RCA	15 December 2016	1	
73	Leonard Cohen	You Want It Darker	Columbia	22 December 2016	1	
re	Amy Winehouse	Back to Black	Island	29 December 2016	1	
2017
74	Original Soundtrack	Guardians of the Galaxy - Awesome Mix	Hollywood	5 January 2017	1	
re	Amy Winehouse	Back to Black	Island	12 January 2017	1	
75	David Bowie	Bowie Legacy	Parlophone	19 January 2017	1	
76	The xx	I See You	Young Turks	26 January 2017	1	
77	Frank Carter & the Rattlesnakes	Modern Ruin	International Death Cult	2 February 2017	1	
78	Original Soundtrack	Pulp Fiction	MCA	9 February 2017	1	
79	Elbow	Little Fictions	Polydor	16 February 2017	1	
80	Rag'n'Bone Man	Human	Best Laid Plans/Columbia	23 February 2017	1	
81	Ryan Adams	Prisoner	Blue Note/Pax Am	2 March 2017	1	
re	Rag'n'Bone Man	Human	Best Laid Plans/Columbia	9 March 2017	1	
82	Ed Sheeran	÷ †	Asylum	16 March 2017	2	
83	The Beatles	Sgt. Pepper's Lonely Hearts Club Band	Apple Corps	30 March 2017	1	
re	Ed Sheeran	÷ †	Asylum	6 April 2017	1	
84	Goldfrapp	Silver Eye	Mute	13 April 2017	1	
85	Father John Misty	Pure Comedy	Bella Union	20 April 2017	1	
re	Ed Sheeran	÷ †	Asylum	27 April 2017	1	
86	David Bowie	Cracked Actor - Live In Los Angeles 74	Parlophone	4 May 2017	1	
87	Gorillaz	Humanz	Parlophone	11 May 2017	1	
88	Kasabian	For Crying Out Loud	Columbia	18 May 2017	1	
89	Harry Styles	Harry Styles	Columbia	25 May 2017	1	
90	Erasure	World Be Gone	Mute	1 June 2017	1	
re	The Beatles	Sgt. Pepper's Lonely Hearts Club Band	Apple Corps	8 June 2017	2	
91	London Grammar	Truth Is a Beautiful Thing	Ministry of Sound	22 June 2017	1	
92	Royal Blood	How Did We Get So Dark?	Warner	29 June 2017	1	
93	Radiohead	OK Computer	XL	6 July 2017	1	
94	The Killers	Hot Fuss	UMC/Virgin	13 July 2017	1	
re	Radiohead	OK Computer	XL	20 July 2017	1	
95	Original Soundtrack	Baby Driver	Columbia	27 July 2017	1	
96	Paul Heaton and Jacqui Abbott	Crooked Calypso	EMI	3 August 2017	1	
97	Arcade Fire	Everything Now	Columbia	10 August 2017	1	
98	David Bowie and Trevor Jones	Labyrinth - Ost	UMC/Virgin	17 August 2017	1	
99	The Cribs	24-7 Rock Star Shit	Sonic Blew	24 August 2017	1	
100	Neck Deep	The Peace and the Panic	Hopeless	31 August 2017	1	
101	Queens of the Stone Age	Villains	Matador	7 September 2017	1	
102	LCD Soundsystem	American Dream	Columbia/DFA	14 September 2017	1	
103	The National	Sleep Well Beast	4AD	21 September 2017	1	
104	Foo Fighters	Concrete and Gold	Columbia	28 September 2017	1	
105	The Killers	Wonderful Wonderful	EMI	5 October 2017	1	
106	Wolf Alice	Visions of a Life	Dirty Hit	12 October 2017	1	
107	Liam Gallagher	As You Were	Warner	19 October 2017	2	
108	George Michael	Listen Without Prejudice Vol. 1	Sony	2 November 2017	1	
109	Stereophonics	Scream Above the Sounds	Parlophone	9 November 2017	1	
110	Sam Smith	The Thrill of It All	Capitol	16 November 2017	1	
111	Shed Seven	Instant Pleasures	BMG	23 November 2017	1	
112	Morrissey	Low in High School	BMG	30 November 2017	1	
113	Noel Gallagher's High Flying Birds	Who Built the Moon?	Sour Mash	7 December 2017	1	
114	U2	Songs of Experience	Island	14 December 2017	1	
re	Noel Gallagher's High Flying Birds	Who Built the Moon?	Sour Mash	21 December 2017	1	
re	Ed Sheeran	÷ †	Asylum	28 December 2017	2	
2018
re	Amy Winehouse	Back to Black	Island	11 January 2018	1	
re	Original Soundtrack	Guardians of the Galaxy - Awesome Mix	Hollywood	18 January 2018	1	
115	Shame	Songs of Praise	Dead Oceans	25 January 2018	1	
116	First Aid Kit	Ruins	Columbia	1 February 2018	1	
117	Jeff Wayne	Jeff Wayne's Musical Version of The War of the Worlds	Sony	8 February 2018	1	
118	Simple Minds	Walk Between Worlds	BMG	15 February 2018	1	
119	The Wombats	Beautiful People Will Ruin Your Life	The Wombats	22 February 2018	1	
120	The Temperance Movement	A Deeper Cut	Earache	1 March 2018	1	
121	David Bowie	Low	Parlophone	8 March 2018	1	
122	The Breeders	All Nerve	4AD	15 March 2018	1	
123	Jimi Hendrix	Both Sides of the Sky	Sony	22 March 2018	1	
124	The Magic Gang	The Magic Gang	Warner/Yala	29 March 2018	1	
125	George Ezra	Staying at Tamara's	Columbia	5 April 2018	1	
126	Various Artists	The Greatest Showman: Original Motion Picture Soundtrack	Atlantic	12 April 2018	1	
127	Kylie Minogue	Golden	BMG	19 April 2018	1	
128	Manic Street Preachers	Resistance Is Futile	Columbia	26 April 2018	1	
129	David Bowie	Welcome to the Blackout (Live London '78)	Parlophone	3 May 2018	1	
130	Blossoms	Cool Like You	EMI	10 May 2018	1	
131	Frank Turner	Be More Kind	Polydor	17 May 2018	1	
132	Arctic Monkeys	Tranquility Base Hotel & Casino †	Domino	24 May 2018	1	
133	Courtney Barnett	Tell Me How You Really Feel	Marathon Artists	31 May 2018	1	
134	Biffy Clyro	MTV Unplugged: Live at Roundhouse, London	14th Floor	7 June 2018	1	
135	Father John Misty	God's Favorite Customer	Bella Union	14 June 2018	1	
136	The Who	My Generation	Polydor	21 June 2018	1	
137	Johnny Marr	Call the Comet	New Voodoo	28 June 2018	1	
138	Panic! at the Disco	Pray for the Wicked	Fueled by Ramen	5 July 2018	1	
139	Florence & the Machine	High as Hope	EMI	12 July 2018	1	
140	Tom Grennan	Lighting Matches	Insanity	19 July 2018	1	
141	Rolling Stones	Hot Rocks 1964–1971	Decca Pop	26 July 2018	1	
142	Various Artists	Now That's What I Call Music	Virgin/EMI	2 August 2018	2	
143	James	Living in Extraordinary Times	Infectious	16 August 2018	1	
144	Miles Kane	Coup de Grace	EMI	23 August 2018	1	
145	Slaves	Acts of Fear and Love	EMI	30 August 2018	1	
146	Interpol	Marauder	Matador	6 September 2018	1	
147	Idles	Joy as an Act of Resistance	Partisan	13 September 2018	1	
148	Spiritualized	And Nothing Hurt	Bella Union	20 September 2018	1	
149	Aphex Twin	Collapse	Warp	27 September 2018	1	
150	Suede	The Blue Hour	Rhino	4 October 2018	1	
151	Nick Cave and the Bad Seeds	Distant Sky: Live in Copenhagen	Bad Seed	11 October 2018	1	
152	Twenty One Pilots	Trench	Warner	18 October 2018	1	
153	Kurt Vile	Bottle It In	Matador	25 October 2018	1	
154	Richard Ashcroft	Natural Rebel	BMG	1 November 2018	1	
155	Thom Yorke	Suspiria	XL	8 November 2018	1	
156	The Prodigy	No Tourists	BMG	15 November 2018	1	
157	Muse	Simulation Theory	Warner	22 November 2018	1	
158	Mumford & Sons	Delta	Gentleman of the Road/Island	29 November 2018	1	
159	Queen	Greatest Hits	UMC	6 December 2018	1	
160	The 1975	A Brief Inquiry into Online Relationships	Dirty Hit/Polydor	13 December 2018	1	
re	Queen	Greatest Hits	UMC	20 December 2018	3	
2019
161	Nirvana	Nevermind	Geffen	10 January 2019	1	
re	Queen	Greatest Hits	UMC	17 January 2019	1	
re	Various Artists	The Greatest Showman: Original Motion Picture Soundtrack	Atlantic	24 January 2019	1	
162	Twilight Sad	It Won/t Be Like This All the Time	Rock Action	31 January 2019	1	
163	Bring Me the Horizon	Amo	RCA	7 February 2019	1	
164	Ian Brown	Ripples	EMI	14 February 2019	1	
165	Queen	Bohemian Rhapsody: The Original Soundtrack	Virgin	21 February 2019	1	
166	J.Cole	KOD	Interscope	28 February 2019	1	
167	Sleaford Mods	Eton Alive	Extreme Eating	7 March 2019	1	
168	Hozier	Wasteland, Baby!	Island	14 March 2019	1	
169	Foals	Everything Not Saved Will Be Lost – Part 1	Warner	21 March 2019	1	
170	The Cinematic Orchestra	To Believe	Ninja Tune	28 March 2019	1	
171	Mansun	Six	Kscope	4 April 2019	1	
172	Billie Eilish	When We All Fall Asleep, Where Do We Go?	Interscope	11 April 2019	2	
173	Fontaines D.C.	Dogrel	Partisan	25 April 2019	1	
174	Fat White Family	Serf's Up	Domino	2 May 2019	1	
175	Catfish and the Bottlemen	The Balance	Island	9 May 2019	1	
176	Frank Carter & the Rattlesnakes	End of Suffering	International Death Cult	16 May 2019	1	
177	Mac DeMarco	Here Comes the Cowboy	Caroline	23 May 2019	1	
178	Lewis Capaldi	Divinely Uninspired to a Hellish Extent	EMI	30 May 2019	1	
179	Morrissey	California Son	BMG	6 June 2019	1	
180	Richard Hawley	Further	BMG	13 June 2019	1	
181	Pink Floyd	The Division Bell	Rhino	20 June 2019	1	
182	Joy Division	Unknown Pleasures	Rhino	27 June 2019	1	
183	The Raconteurs	Help Us Stranger	Third Man	4 July 2019	1	
184	Kylie Minogue	Step Back in Time: The Definitive Collection	BMG/Rhino	11 July 2019	1	
185	Spice Girls	Greatest Hits	Virgin	18 July 2019	1	
186	Various Artists	Tiny Changes - A Celebration Of	Atlantic	25 July 2019	1	
187	Thom Yorke	Anima	XL Recordings	1 August 2019	1	
188	Kaiser Chiefs	Duck	Polydor	8 August 2019	1	
189	Original Cast Recording	Doctor Who - Wave of Destruction	Demon	15 August 2019	1	
190	Slipknot	We Are Not Your Kind	Roadrunner	22 August 2019	1	
191	Frank Turner	No Man's Land	Polydor	29 August 2019	1	
192	New Model Army	From Here	EarMUSIC	5 September 2019	1	
193	Oasis	Definitely Maybe	Big Brother	12 September 2019	1	
194	Bat For Lashes	Lost Girl	Bat For Lashes	19 September 2019	1	
195	Sam Fender	Hypersonic Missiles	Polydor	26 September 2019	1	
196	Liam Gallagher	Why Me? Why Not. †	Warner	3 October 2019	1	
197	The Beatles	Abbey Road	Apple Corps	10 October 2019	2	
198	Elbow	Giants of All Sizes	Polydor	24 October 2019	1	
199	Foals	Everything Not Saved Will Be Lost – Part 2	Warner	31 October 2019	1	
200	Stereophonics	Kind	Parlophone	7 November 2019	1	
201	Michael Kiwanuka	Kiwanuka	Polydor	14 November 2019	1	
202	Nick Cave and the Bad Seeds	Ghosteen	Ghosteen	21 November 2019	1	
203	Various artists	Peaky Blinders	UMC	28 November 2019	1	
204	Coldplay	Everyday Life	Parlophone	5 December 2019	1	
205	Fleetwood Mac	Rumours ‡	Wea	12 December 2019	1	
206	The Who	Who	Polydor	19 December 2019	1	
207	Harry Styles	Fine Line	Columbia	26 December 2019	1	

=== By record label ===
18 record labels have topped the chart for at least three weeks.

Record label	Number-one albums	Weeks at number one
Columbia	18	19
Parlophone	13	13
XL	5	12
Polydor	11	11
RCA	6	11
Island	6	11
Warner	10	11
BMG	10	10
EMI	9	9
Rhino	9	9
Asylum	1	6
Sony	5	6
UMC	2	6
Apple Corps	2	5
Dirty Hit	2	4
Domino	3	3
International Death Cult	3	3
Virgin	3	3

=== By artist ===
14 artists topped the chart for at least three weeks.

Artist	Number-one albums	Weeks at number one
David Bowie	8	13
Amy Winehouse	1	7
Ed Sheeran	1	6
Queen	2	6
The Beatles	2	5
Radiohead	1	5
Adele	1	4
Elvis Presley	2	3
Foals	3	3
Frank Carter & the Rattlesnakes	3	3
Liam Gallagher	2	3
Nick Cave and the Bad Seeds	3	3
Noel Gallagher's High Flying Birds	2	3

== See also ==
- List of Official Vinyl Singles Chart number ones of the 2010s
