= Deep Down Happy =

Studio album by Sports Team
- Released: 5 June 2020
- Length: 36:34
- Label: Island
- Producer: Burke Reid

Sports Team chronology
Keep Walking! (2019)	Deep Down Happy (2020)	Gulp! (2022)

Singles from Deep Down Happy
- 1. "Kutcher" Released: 4 May 2018; 2. "Here It Comes Again" Released: 11 June 2019; 3. "Fishing" Released: 11 September 2019; 4. "The Races" Released: 18 November 2019

Deep Down Happy is the debut studio album by English alternative rock band Sports Team. It was released on 5 June 2020 under Island Records, and was nominated for the Mercury Prize 2020.

== Singles ==
On 12 June 2019, Sports Team released the first single "Here It Comes Again". The second single "Fishing" was released on 12 September 2019. On 19 November 2019, the third single "The Races" was released. On 18 February 2020, the band announced their new album – scheduled for the original release of 3 April 2020 – along with the fourth single "Here's The Thing".

== Commercial performance ==
On 12 June 2020, the album ranked at No. 2 on the Official Charts Company's UK Albums Chart. Sports Team lost the Number 1 spot to Lady Gaga's "Chromatica". It gained No. 1 in Scotland

== Tour ==
On 19 June 2020, the band announced a tour of the UK, scheduled for April 2021.

== Critical reception ==
Professional ratings
Aggregate scores
Source	Rating
Metacritic	78/100
Review scores
Source	Rating
AllMusic	4/5 stars
DIY	4/5 stars
Dork	4/5 stars
The Line of Best Fit	9.5/10
MusicOMH	3.5/5 stars
NME	4/5 stars
The Observer	4/5 stars
The Times	4/5 stars
Paste	7.7/10

Deep Down Happy was met with "generally favourable" reviews from critics. At Metacritic, which assigns a weighted average rating out of 100 to reviews from mainstream publications, this release received an average score of 78, based on 11 reviews. Aggregator Album of the Year gave the album 78 out of 100 from a critical consensus of 14 reviews.

== Track listing ==
All tracks are written by Alex Davies, Alexander Rice, Alexandra Greenwood, Benjamin Mack, Henry Young, Oliver Dewdney, Robert Knaggs.

Deep Down Happy track listing
No.	Title	Length
1.	"Lander"	2:36
2.	"Here It Comes Again"	2:16
3.	"Going Soft"	3:23
4.	"Camel Crew"	3:33
5.	"Long Hot Summer"	2:54
6.	"Feels like Fun"	2:40
7.	"Here's the Thing"	2:55
8.	"The Races"	3:23
9.	"Born Sugar"	3:13
10.	"Fishing"	3:06
11.	"Kutcher"	3:04
12.	"Stations of the Cross"	3:31

== Charts ==
Chart performance for Deep Down Happy
Chart (2020)	Peak position
Scottish Albums (Official Charts)	1
UK Albums (Official Charts)	2
