= Songs for the Spine =

Studio album by The Royston Club
- Released: August 8, 2025
- Genre: Indie rock; guitar pop
- Length: 39:15
- Label: Modern Sky
- Producer: Richard Turvey

The Royston Club chronology
Shaking Hips and Crashing Cars (2023)	Songs for the Spine (2025)

Singles from Songs for the Spine
- 1. "The Patch Where Nothing Grows" Released: 8 August 2024; 2. "Shivers" Released: 23 April 2025; 3. "Glued to the Bed" Released: 22 May 2025; 4. "Cariad" Released: 9 July 2025; 5. "30/20" Released: 6 August 2025

Songs for the Spine is the second studio album by the Welsh indie rock band The Royston Club. It was released on 8 August 2025, via Modern Sky in cassette, CD, digital download, LP, and streaming formats.

== Background ==
Produced by Richard Turvey, the album was preceded by the band's 2023 debut release, Shaking Hips and Crashing Cars.

The fourth single of the album, "Cariad", was released on 9 July 2025, succeeding previously released singles, "The Patch Where Nothing Grows" in 2024, "Shivers" in April 2025, and "Glued to the Bed" in May 2025.

== Reception ==
Professional ratings
Review scores
Source	Rating
Clash	8/10
MusicOMH	3/5
Narc	4/5

Susan Hansen of Clash described the album as "Lofty, anthemic and compelling", calling it "a joy from start to finish, this collection of numbers flourish, as the songs come to life." MusicOMH rated the album three stars and stated, "It's stripped of excess, with Rich Turvey's production finding a sweet spot between raw and radio-friendly," calling it "an easy, crowd-pleasing listen – breezy guitar-pop that rarely offends and often uplifts." Narc assigned the album a score of four out of five, referring to it as "a confident sophomore release" that "stands out in a crowded indie guitar-driven band market."

== Track listing ==
All lyrics are written by Ben Matthias, except where noted; all music is composed by The Royston Club (Tom Faithfull, Sam Jones, Matthias, and Dave Tute).

Songs for the Spine track listing
No.	Title	Lyrics	Length
1.	"Shivers"		4:24
2.	"The Patch Where Nothing Grows"	Faithfull; Jones; Matthias; Tute	3:18
3.	"Crowbar"	Faithfull	3:52
4.	"Glued to the Bed"		3:39
5.	"Cariad"		4:15
6.	"30/20"		3:05
7.	"Spinning"		3:40
8.	"Through the Cracks"	Faithfull	3:11
9.	"Curses & Spit"		3:28
10.	"The Ballad of Glen Campbell"		6:23
Total length:			39:15

== Personnel ==
Credits adapted from Tidal.

=== The Royston Club ===
- Tom Faithfull – vocals (all tracks), guitar (tracks 2–5, 7, 8)
- Sam Jones – drums, vocals (10)
- Ben Matthias – vocals (1–4, 6–10), guitar (all tracks)
- Dave Tute – bass guitar

=== Additional contributors ===
- Richard Turvey – production, engineering (all tracks); guitar (7), programming (8), piano (10)
- Tom Longworth – mixing
- Joe LaPorta – mastering

== Charts ==
Chart performance for Songs for the Spine
Chart (2025)	Peak position
UK Independent Albums (Official Charts)	1
