= Gulp! =

Studio album by Sports Team
- Released: 23 September 2022
- Length: 33:42
- Label: Island
- Producer: Burke Reid

Sports Team chronology
Deep Down Happy (2020)	Gulp! (2022)	Boys These Days (2025)

Singles from Gulp!
- 1. "R Entertainment" Released: 29 March 2022; 2. "The Game" Released: 19 May 2022; 3. "Cool It Kid" Released: 17 June 2022; 4. "The Drop" Released: 3 August 2022

Gulp! is the second studio album by English band Sports Team. It was released on 23 September 2022 through Island.

== Background ==
On 29 March 2022, Sports Team announced they were releasing their new album on 22 July 2022. Along with the album announcement, the band released the first single "R Entertainment".

The band released their second single "The Game", with the music video featuring musician John Otway, on 19 May 2022. "The Game" was featured on the NHL 23 soundtrack.

The third single "Cool It Kid" was released on 19 June 2022. The band said the single is about "getting too deep in your stress about stuff and sometimes saying to yourself, You know what, maybe sometimes you should sit back and it's best not to react on your intense, irrational emotions." Asha Lorenz, of the band Sorry, features as vocals on the single.

However, on 12 July 2022, in an Instagram post, Sports Team announced they were moving the release of the album to 26 August 2022 due to production issues. The album ended up being moved again to 23 September 2022, along with the cancellations of their U.S. tour.

The fourth single "The Drop" was released on 4 August 2022. The music video for the single is directed by A. T. Mann.

== Critical reception ==
Professional ratings
Aggregate scores
Source	Rating
Metacritic	78/100
Review scores
Source	Rating
AllMusic	3.5/5 stars
DIY	3.5/5 stars
The Independent	5/5 stars
NME	4/5 stars

Gulp! was met with "generally favorable" reviews from critics. At Metacritic, which assigns a weighted average rating out of 100 to reviews from mainstream publications, this release received an average score of 78, based on 6 reviews.

== Track listing ==
Gulp! track listing
No.	Title	Length
1.	"The Game"	2:50
2.	"Dig!"	2:41
3.	"The Drop"	2:58
4.	"Cool It Kid"	3:30
5.	"Unstuck"	3:45
6.	"R Entertainment"	3:08
7.	"Kool Aid"	3:03
8.	"Getting Better"	4:13
9.	"Fingers (Taken Off)"	2:55
10.	"Light Industry"	4:35
Total length:		33:42

== Charts ==
Chart performance for Gulp!
Chart (2022)	Peak position
Scottish Albums (Official Charts)	3
UK Albums (Official Charts)	3
