= The Royston Club =

Welsh indie rock band

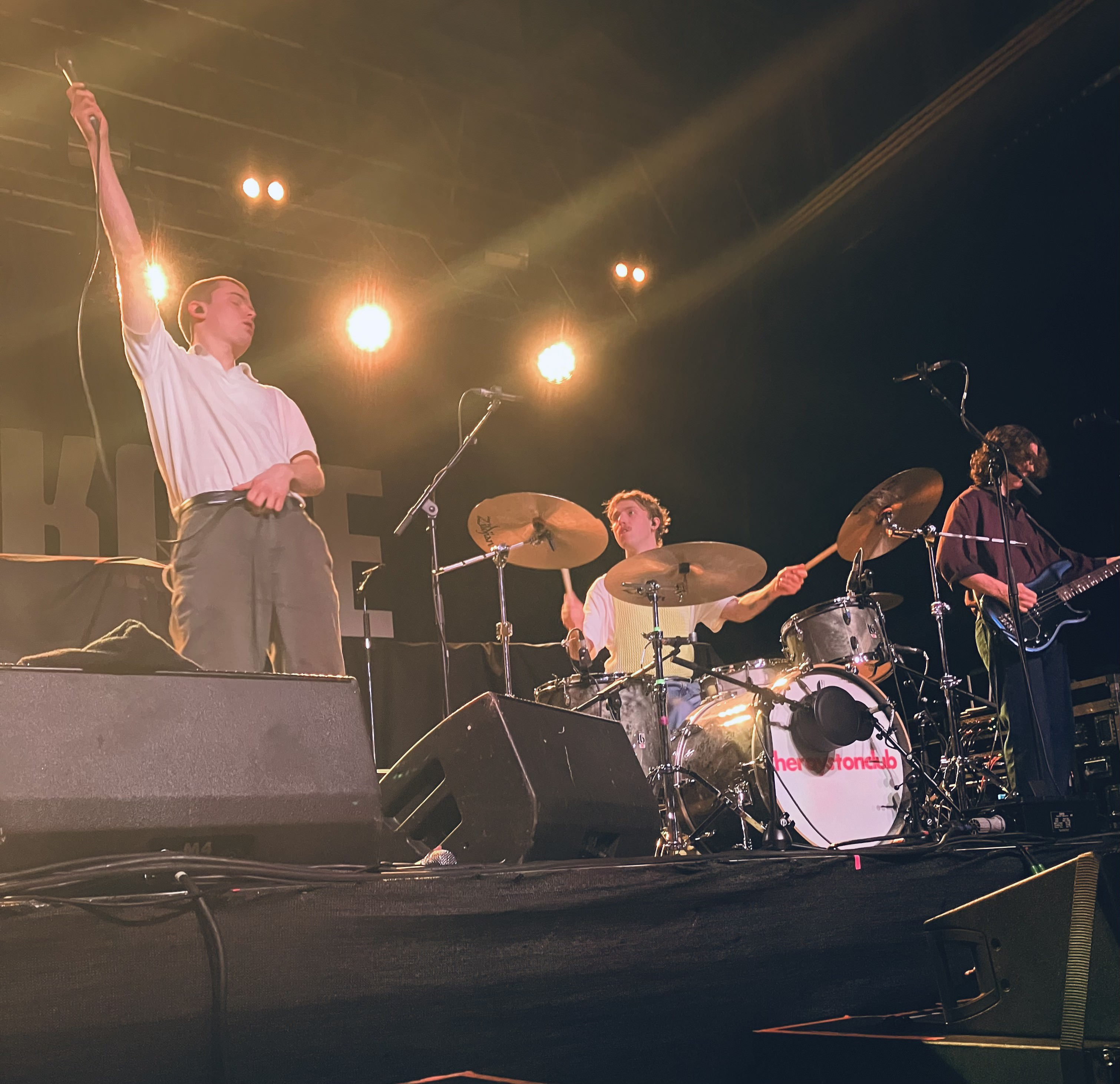
- The Royston Club performing in 2024

Background information
- Origin: Wrexham, Denbighshire, Wales
- Genre: Indie rock
- Years active: 2019–present
- Labels: Run On; Modern Sky UK
- Members: Tom Faithfull; Ben Matthias; Dave Tute; Sam Jones
- Website: theroystonclub.com

The Royston Club are a Welsh indie rock band formed in Wrexham in 2019 by Tom Faithfull (lead vocals, rhythm guitar), Ben Matthias (lead guitar), Dave Tute (bass), and Sam Jones (drums).

== History ==
=== 2017–2019: Formation and early singles ===
In 2017, Faithfull, Matthias, and Tute played mainly covers together in secondary school due to their shared interest in indie music. When Matthias began to write original songs, he realised they needed a drummer and—through a good friend—they found Jones, who joined in late 2018. The four started an open mic night at local pub Saith Seren, where they received praise, helping their confidence and leading them to continue pursuing music.

Matthias, while visiting his grandparents in Acrefair, repeatedly saw an old man’s club called “Royston Club”. The band decided to adpot the name.

In March 2019, about three months after their formation, they released their debut single “Shawshank”, and went on to release “Waster” and “Kerosene” later that year, both receiving some radio play.

== Band members ==
- Tom Faithfull – lead vocals, guitar (2019–present)
- Ben Matthias – guitar (2019–present)
- Dave Tute – bass (2019–present)
- Sam Jones – drums (2019–present)

== Discography ==
The Royston Club discography
- Studio albums: 2
- EPs: 2
- Singles: 20
- Music videos: 12

=== Studio albums ===
Title	Details	Peak chart positions	
Title	Details	UK	SCO
Shaking Hips and Crashing Cars	Released: 2 June 2023; Label: Run On, Modern Sky UK; Format: CD, digital download, LP, streaming	16	8
Songs for the Spine	Released: 8 August 2025; Label: Run On, Modern Sky UK; Format: Cassette, CD, digital download, LP, streaming	4	1

=== Extended plays ===
Title	Details	Peak chart positions
Title	Details	UK
This State I'm In	Released: 28 March 2020; Label: Warsp; Format: Digital download, streaming	—
Lying Here, Wasting Away	Released: 1 October 2021; Label: Run On, Modern Sky UK; Format: Digital download, streaming	64
Roystern...Live From Coastal Studios	Released: 10 October 2025; Label: Run On, Modern Sky UK; Format: Streaming	—

=== Singles ===
Title	Year	Album
"Shawshank" (demo)	2019	Non-album singles
"Waster"	2019	Non-album singles
"Kerosene"	2019	Non-album singles
"Mariana"	2020	This State I’m In
"Believe It or Not"	2020	This State I’m In
"Untitled" (demo)	2020	Non-album single
"Mrs Narcissistic"	2020	Lying Here, Wasting Away
"Coasting"	2021	Non-album single
"Cold Sweats"	2021	Lying Here, Wasting Away
"The Backburner"	2021	Lying Here, Wasting Away
"Old Man's Knees"	2022	Non-album single
"Blisters"	2023	Shaking Hips and Crashing Cars
"Shallow Tragedy"	2023	Shaking Hips and Crashing Cars
"Cherophobe"	2023	Shaking Hips and Crashing Cars
"Missed the Boat (Jumped in the Sea)"	2023	Shaking Hips and Crashing Cars
"The Patch Where Nothing Grows"	2024	Songs for the Spine
"Shivers"	2025	Songs for the Spine
"Glued to the Bed"	2025	Songs for the Spine
"Cariad"	2025	Songs for the Spine
"30/20"	2025	Songs for the Spine

=== Music videos ===
Title	Year	Director
"Kerosene"	2019	The Royston Club
"Mrs Narcissistic"	2020	Polyphonica
"Coasting"	2021	Polyphonica
"The Backburner"	2021	The Royston Club
"Old Man's Knees"	2022	Ben & Joe Matthias
"Blisters"	2023	The Royston Club
"Shallow Tragedy"	2023	The Royston Club
"Cherophobe"	2023	The Royston Club
"The Deep End"	2023	The Royston Club
"The Patch Where Nothing Grows"	2024	Sam Crowston
"Shivers"	2025	Sam Crowston
"Glued to the Bed"	2025	James Ogram
"Cariad"	2025	James Slater

== Tours ==
Headlining

- This State I’m In Tour (2021)
- Lying Here, Wasting Away Tour (2022)
- Shaking Hips and Crashing Cars Tour (2023)
- Songs for the Spine Tour (2025/2026)
