= The Orielles =

English indie rock band

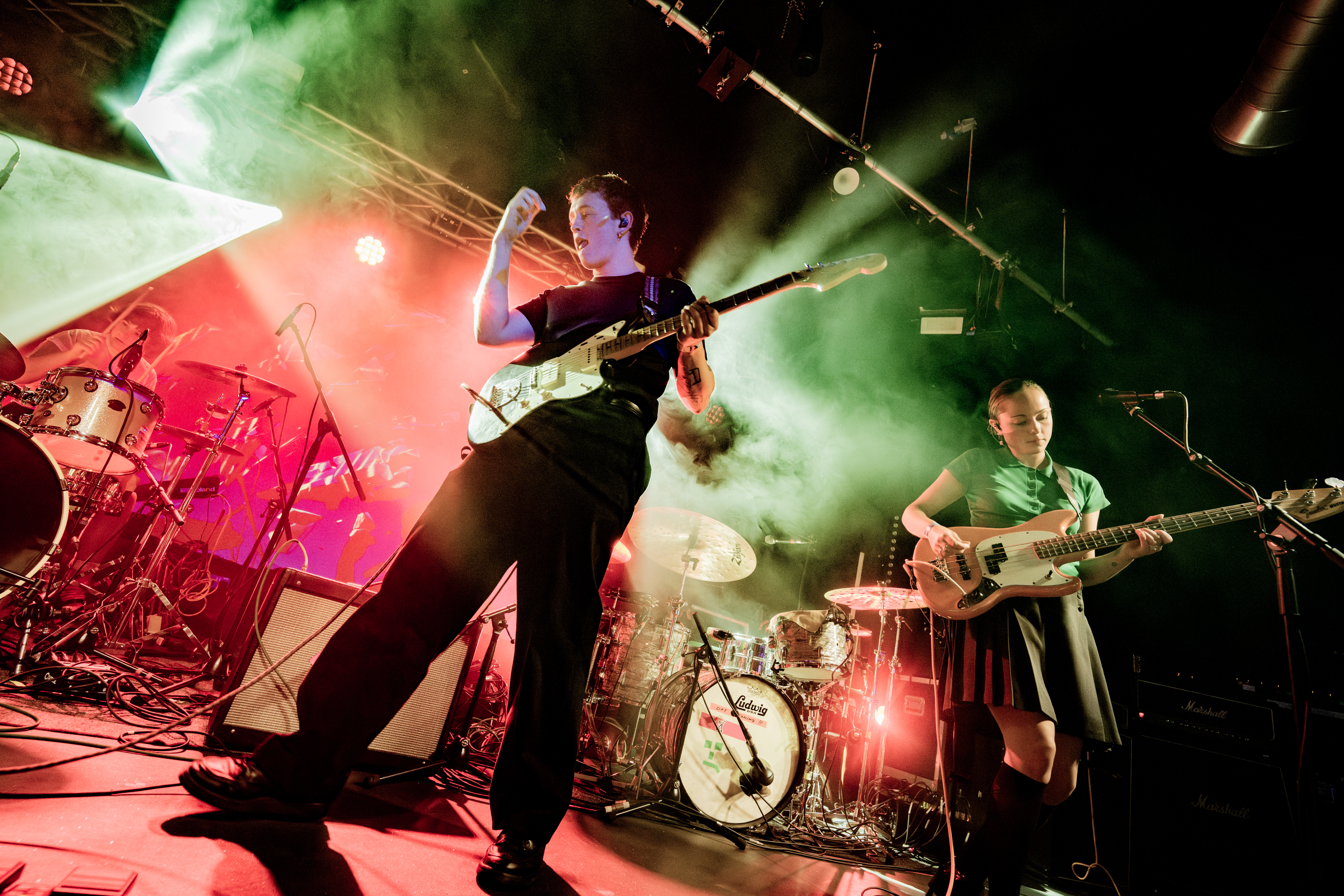
- The Orielles performing at The Mutations Festival, Brighton UK, 7 November 2025

Background information
- Origin: Halifax, West Yorkshire, England
- Genres: Indie rock; indie pop; post-rock; space rock
- Label: Heavenly Records
- Members: Esmé Dee Hand-Halford; Henry Carlyle Wade; Sidonie B. Hand-Halford
- Past members: Alex Stephens

The Orielles are an English indie rock band from Halifax, West Yorkshire, England. The band features Sidonie "Sid" B. Hand-Halford on drums, Esmé Dee Hand-Halford on bass and vocals and Henry Carlyle Wade on guitar and vocals.

== Career ==
Their debut album, Silver Dollar Moment, was released in February 2018 on Heavenly Records. AllMusic described the album as a "stunning debut... it does have a uniquely sweet spirit and lighthearted beauty all its own by a young U.K. trio that gives the baggy indie dance sound of the early '90s a serious upgrade."

Their second album, Disco Volador, was released in February 2020 on Heavenly Records. It was produced by Marta Sologni. The Guardian gave it a three out of five stars rating, describing the album as the band "expanding the sound of their winsome but somewhat conventional debut by abandoning traditional song structures and voyaging into new textures." It has a Metacritic rating of 73, with Uncut commenting that the album mixes "the euphoria of whooshing through infinite space past astral displays of imagined beauty via a blend of disco funk, dream pop, electronic exotica and '70s highlife" and Q expressing that the album is "both instantly appealing and dazzling inventive."

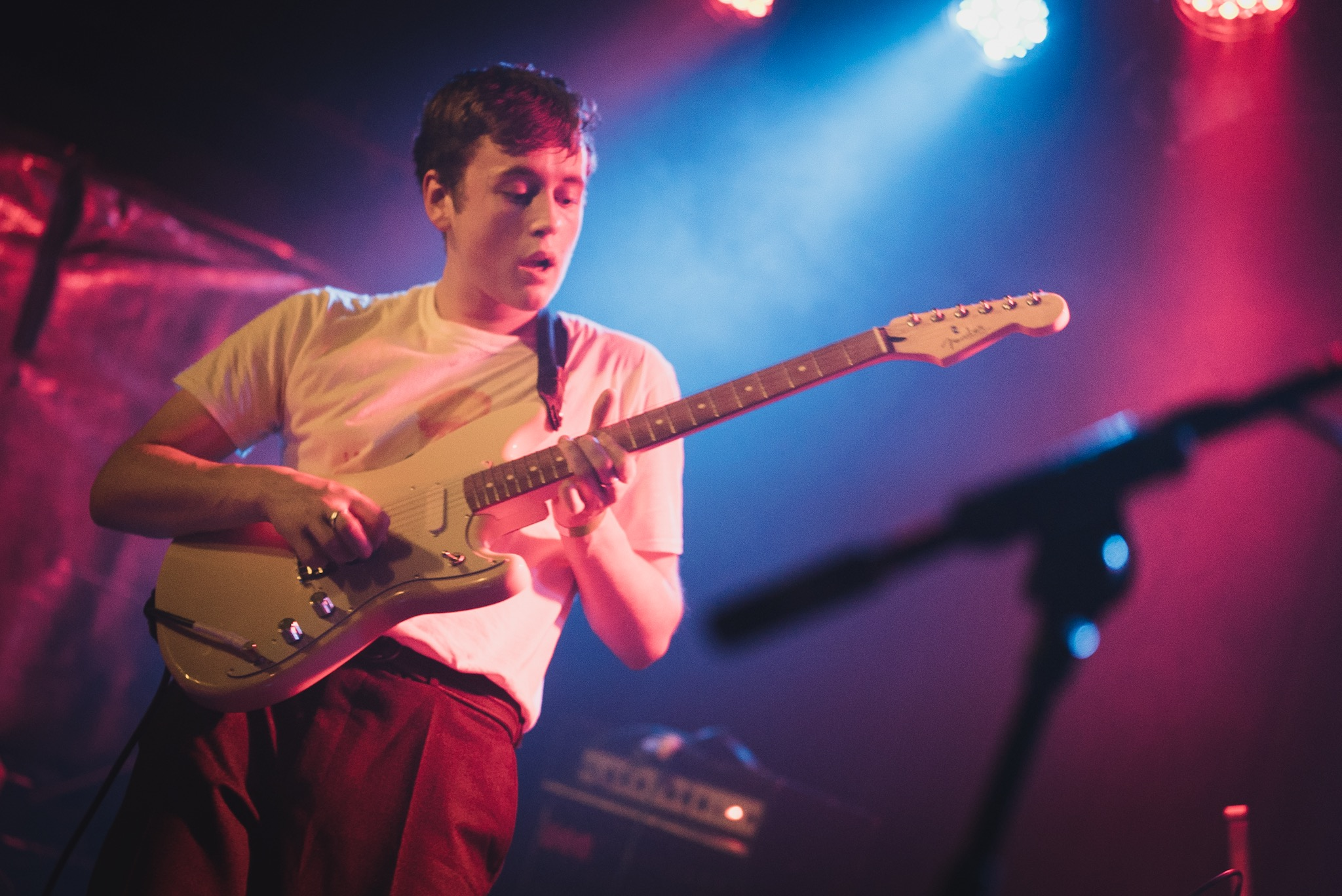
Henry Carlyle Wade playing guitar

On October 7, 2022, the band released their third album, Tableau, on Heavenly Records. The band describe the album as "an experimental double album", and it was self-produced in collaboration with Joel Anthony Patchett.

Again on Heavenly Records they released in March 2026 their fourth album „Only You Left“. The eleven tracks are roughly bound by a central polarity of “wood versus metal”.

== Discography ==
=== Albums ===
- Silver Dollar Moment (2018)
- Disco Volador (2020)
- La Vita Olistica (2021)
- Tableau (2022)
- Only You Left (2026)

=== Singles ===
- "Yawn" (2014)
- "Space Doubt" (2015)
- "Joey Says We Got It" (2015)
- "Jobin" (2016)
- "Sugar Tastes Like Salt" (2017)
- "I Only Bought It for the Bottle (2017)
- "Let Your Dogtooth Grow" (2017)
- "Blue Suitcase (Disco Wrist)" (2018)
- "Bobbi's Second World" (2018)
- "It Makes You Forget (Itgehane)" (2019)
- "Come Down on Jupiter" (2019)
- "Space Samba (Disco Volador Theme)" (2020)
- "Beam/s" (2022)
- "The Room" (2022)
- "Tableau Remixes" EP (2022)
