= Sports Team =

UK alternative rock band

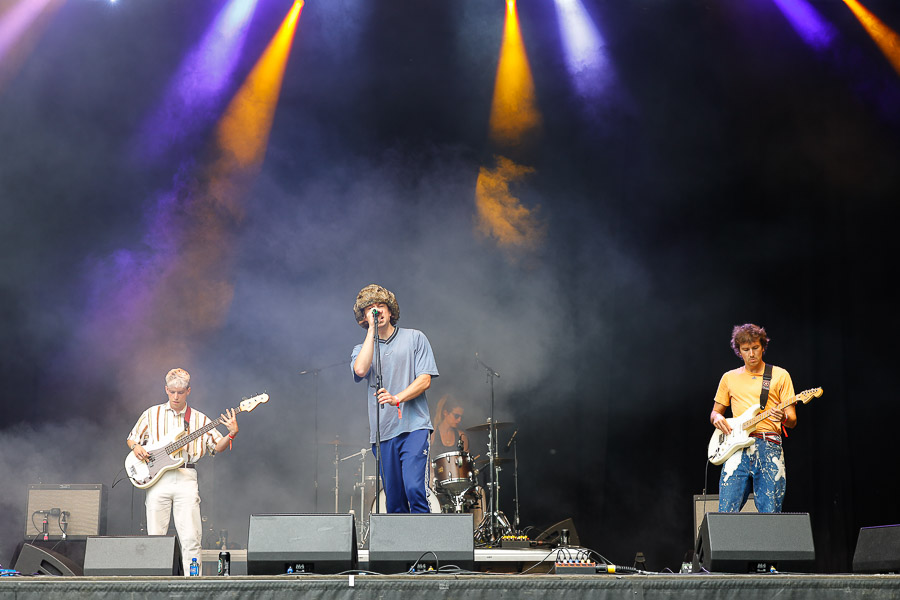
- Sports Team in 2022 on stage at the festival Piknik i Parken in Oslo

Background information
- Origin: Cambridge, England
- Genres: Alternative rock; indie rock; post-punk
- Years active: 2016–present
- Labels: Island; Bright Antenna; Nice Swan
- Members: Alex Rice; Oli Dewdney; Al Greenwood; Rob Knaggs; Ben Mack; Henry Young
- Past members: Jerry Cummins
- Website: sportsteamband.com

Sports Team are an English alternative rock band based in London. The band consists of lead vocalist Alex Rice, rhythm guitarist and vocalist Rob Knaggs, lead guitarist Henry Young, bassist Oli Dewdney, drummer Al Greenwood, and keyboardist Ben Mack. According to The Guardian, their songs "romanticise Middle England" and idiosyncrasies like Wetherspoons, flip phones, the M5, and fishing.

== History ==
The group met while studying at the University of Cambridge, aside from Dewdney, who studied at the University of Bristol. Jerry Cummins was an original band member (bass), before leaving to set up his own regenerative farm, Pitino Agricolo. The band performed in their early days at the Portland Arms, a pub in the north of Cambridge. The band's members continued to work their day jobs until they became better known. Henry Young was a sports reporter for CNN.

On 3 December 2024, Sports Team were robbed at gunpoint outside a Starbucks in Vallejo, California on the first day of their US tour. The band recounted that they were stopped for breakfast en route to a performance at Goldfield Trading Post in Sacramento, California, when they were notified that "some guys" were smashing their van's windows and taking items from inside of it. When the band's tour manager attempted to confront the robbers, one of them pulled a gun on her. The incident was captured on cellphone video by another member of the band and shared on social media. The robbers successfully escaped with the band's stage gear, passports and other personal items. Sports Team vocalist Alex Rice recounted that onlookers seemed unfazed by the robbery, and drummer Al Greenwood claims the Starbucks employees simply "carried on with their shift". No officers arrived to investigate the robbery, and the band was advised to fill out an online form. The band was able to play their planned tour date in Sacramento, as their musical instruments were not among the items stolen in the robbery. The band declared on social media, "They can take our Nintendo Switches but they can never take our ability to play rock songs about motorways".

== Releases ==
Their debut EP Winter Nets was released in January 2018 on Nice Swan Records, and their second EP Keep Walking! was released in 2019.

Their debut album Deep Down Happy was released on 5 June 2020 on Island Records and Bright Antenna Records. The lead single Here's The Thing was released on 17 February 2020. The album received four out of five stars from NME, and was nominated for the Mercury Prize in 2020.

Sports Team released a limited edition B-sides and rarities vinyl on 28 May 2021 called Plant Test, which they announced on their Instagram. It was made available only at independent retailers in the UK.

On 28 March 2022, the band announced their second album, Gulp!, alongside lead single "R Entertainment". Gulp was released on 23 September 2022, and received four out of five stars from NME.

On 18 July 2024, the band announced their third album Boys These Days as well as releasing the first single "I'm in Love (Subaru)" and headlining their first show in London in two years at Omeara. It was released on 23 May 2025.

== Critical reception ==
After releasing their debut EP Winter Nets, the band performed a show in September 2018 at Scala in London, which the band's lyricist Knaggs described as when the group started "being in a band nearly every single day".

Following the Scala show, the band went on to play at both Electric Ballroom and O2 Forum Kentish Town in 2019 with sell-out shows. The band's preference for surprise shows at venues like The Nag's Head in Camberwell led to DIY describing the shows as harking "back to the heady days of The Libertines".

== Style ==
Sports Team's music has been described as a combination of "energetic guitar rock with dry humor and playful arrogance". The band have been described as holding unusual engagements with their fans, from their annual trips to Margate by coach where "fans, bands and booze collide for unscripted antics", and for taking "whole venues to the pub with them" after a show.

However, this has been balanced with media commentary on the band's Cambridge educations, at a time when bands like Idles and Fontaines D.C. have pushed working class lyrics. Alex Rice notably drew criticism for disparaging London musicians in The Guardian for being Goldsmiths graduates who he dubbed "Gucci" magicians, in reference to HMLTD, who he declared were "one of the worst bands ever". Clash stated in 2019 that "Sports Team can't quite shake off their entitlement".

== Discography ==
=== Studio albums ===
Title	Details	Peak chart positions	
Title	Details	UK	SCO
Deep Down Happy	Released: 5 June 2020; Label: Island; Formats: Cassette, CD, digital download, LP, streaming	2	1
Gulp!	Released: 23 September 2022; Label: Island; Formats: CD, cassette, vinyl, digital download, streaming	3	3
Boys These Days	Released: 23 May 2025; Label: Bright Antenna; Formats: CD, cassette, vinyl, digital download, streaming	11	3

=== Extended plays ===
Title	Details
Winter Nets	Released: 29 January 2018; Label: Nice Swan Records; Formats: Digital download, streaming
Keep Walking!	Released: 8 March 2019; Label: Holm Front Records; Formats: Digital download, streaming

=== Singles ===
List of singles, showing year released and album name
Title	Year	Peak chart positions		Album
Title	Year	US Alt.	US AAA	Album
"Stanton"	2017	—	—	Winter Nets
"Beverly Rose"	2018	—	—	Winter Nets
"Kutcher"	2018	—	—	Non-album singles
"Margate"	2018	—	—	Non-album singles
"M5"	2019	—	—	Keep Walking!
"Here It Comes Again"	2019	—	—	Deep Down Happy
"Fishing"	2019	—	—	Deep Down Happy
"The Races"	2019	—	—	Deep Down Happy
"Here's The Thing"	2020	—	—	Deep Down Happy
"Camel Crew"	2020	—	—	Deep Down Happy
"Happy (God"s Own Country)"	2021	—	—	Non-album single
"R Entertainment"	2022	—	—	Gulp!
"The Game"	2022	—	—	Gulp!
"Cool It Kid"	2022	—	—	Gulp!
"The Drop"	2022	34	25	Gulp!
"Dig!"	2022	—	—	Gulp!
"I'm in Love (Subaru)"	2024	33	—	Boys These Days
"Condensation"	2024	—	32	Boys These Days
"Bang Bang Bang"	2025	—	39	Boys These Days
"Maybe When We're 30"	2025	—	—	Boys These Days
"Sensible"	2025	—	—	Boys These Days
"Billy"	2026	TBA	TBA	Non-album single
