= List of UK Album Downloads Chart number ones of the 2020s =

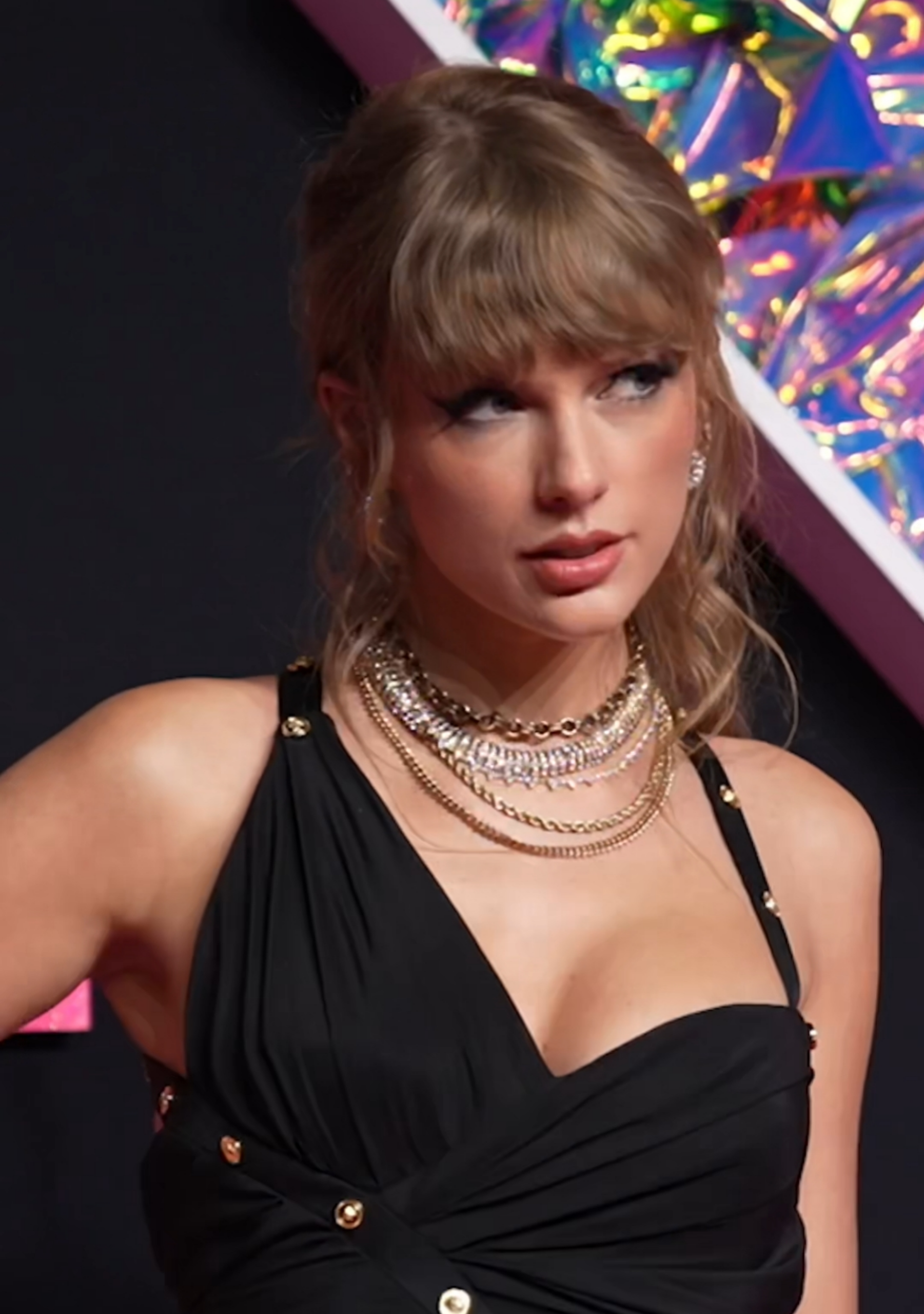
Taylor Swift spent 12 weeks at the top of the album download chart so far in the 2020s, longer than any other artist.

This is the list of the number-one albums of the UK Album Downloads Chart during the 2020s.

== Number-one albums ==
Key
No.	nth album to top the UK Album Downloads Chart
re	Return of an album to number one
†	Most-downloaded album of the year

No.	Artist (Note: The artist, album, date of reaching number one and number of weeks at number one are those given by the Official Charts Company.)	Album	Record label (Note: The record labels are those given by the Official Charts Company.)	Reached number one (for the week ending)	Weeks at number one
2020
re	Various Artists	Now 100 Hits Christmas	EMI/Universal	2 January 2020	1
438	Jme	Grime MC	Boy Better Know	9 January 2020	1
re	Stormzy	Heavy Is the Head	Atlantic/Merky	16 January 2020	1
re	Lewis Capaldi	Divinely Uninspired to a Hellish Extent	EMI	23 January 2020	1
439	Eminem	Music to Be Murdered By	Interscope	30 January 2020	2
440	Liam Gallagher	Acoustic Sessions	Warner	13 February 2020	1
441	Green Day	Father of All...	Reprise	20 February 2020	1
442	Justin Bieber	Changes	Def Jam	27 February 2020	1
443	BTS	Map of the Soul: 7	Big Hit	5 March 2020	1
444	Five Finger Death Punch	F8	Better Noise	12 March 2020	1
445	Paul Heaton & Jacqui Abbott	Manchester Calling	EMI	19 March 2020	1
446	The Shires	Good Years	BMG	26 March 2020	1
447	The Weeknd	After Hours	Republic/XO	2 April 2020	1
448	Dua Lipa	Future Nostalgia	Warner	9 April 2020	2
449	Laura Marling	Song for Our Daughter	Chrysalis	23 April 2020	1
450	Gerry Cinnamon	The Bonny	Little Runaway	30 April 2020	1
re	Dua Lipa	Future Nostalgia	Warner	7 May 2020	1
451	Various Artists	100 Hits - Wartime Memories	100 Hits	14 May 2020	1
452	Various Artists	Now That's What I Call Music! 105	EMI/Universal	21 May 2020	2
453	KSI	Dissimulation	RBC	4 June 2020	1
454	Lady Gaga	Chromatica	Interscope	11 June 2020	1
455	Sports Team	Deep Down Happy	Big Desert/Island	18 June 2020	1
456	Liam Gallagher	MTV Unplugged (Live at Hull City Hall)	Warner	25 June 2020	1
457	Bob Dylan	Rough and Rowdy Ways	Columbia	2 July 2020	1
458	Haim	Women in Music Pt. III	Polydor	9 July 2020	1
459	Paul Weller	On Sunset	Polydor	16 July 2020	1
460	DMA's	The Glow	Infectious	23 July 2020	1
461	Ellie Goulding	Brightest Blue	Polydor	30 July 2020	1
462	Taylor Swift	Folklore	EMI	6 August 2020	1
463	Various Artists	Now That's What I Call Music! 106	EMI/Universal	13 August 2020	2
464	Biffy Clyro	A Celebration of Endings	Warner	27 August 2020	1
465	The Killers	Imploding the Mirage	EMI	3 September 2020	1
466	Nines	Crabs in a Bucket	Warner	10 September 2020	1
467	Declan McKenna	Zeros	Columbia	17 September 2020	1
468	Doves	The Universal Want	Virgin	24 September 2020	1
469	Ava Max	Heaven & Hell	Atlantic	1 October 2020	1
470	Michael Kiwanuka	Kiwanuka	Polydor	8 October 2020	1
471	Queen + Adam Lambert	Live Around the World	EMI	15 October 2020	1
472	Travis	10 Songs	BMG	22 October 2020	1
re	Michael Kiwanuka	Kiwanuka	Polydor	29 October 2020	1
473	Bruce Springsteen	Letter to You	Columbia	5 November 2020	1
474	Bring Me the Horizon	Post Human: Survival Horror	RCA	12 November 2020	1
475	Kylie Minogue	Disco	BMG	19 November 2020	1
476	AC/DC	Power Up	Columbia	26 November 2020	1
477	BTS	Be	Big Hit	3 December 2020	1
478	Steps	What the Future Holds	BMG	10 December 2020	1
479	Various Artists	Now 100 Hits Christmas2020	EMI/Universal	17 December 2020	1
480	Taylor Swift	Evermore	EMI	24 December 2020	1
re	Various Artists	Now 100 Hits Christmas2020	EMI/Universal	31 December 2020	1
2021
481	Various Artists	Now That's What I Call Music! 107	EMI/Universal	7 January 2021	2
482	Barry Gibb	Greenfields	EMI	21 January 2021	1
483	Passenger	Songs for the Drunk and Broken Hearted	Cooking Vinyl	28 January 2021	1
484	Bicep	Isles	Ninja Tune	4 February 2021	1
485	Celeste	Not Your Muse	Polydor	11 February 2021	1
486	Foo Fighters	Medicine at Midnight	Columbia	18 February 2021	2
487	Ghetts	Conflict of Interest	Warner	4 March 2021	1
488	Architects	For Those That Wish to Exist	Epitaph	11 March 2021	1
489	Kings of Leon	When You See Yourself	Columbia	18 March 2021	1
490	RJ Thompson	Lifeline	Codename	25 March 2021	1
491	Lana Del Rey	Chemtrails over the Country Club	Polydor	1 April 2021	1
492	Various Artists	Now That's What I Call Music! 108	EMI/Universal	8 April 2021	1
493	The Snuts	W.L.	Parlophone	15 April 2021	1
494	Taylor Swift	Fearless (Taylor's Version)	EMI	22 April 2021	1
495	London Grammar	Californian Soil	Ministry of Sound	29 April 2021	1
496	Tom Jones	Surrounded by Time	EMI	6 May 2021	1
497	Royal Blood	Typhoons	Warner	13 May 2021	1
498	Rag'n'Bone Man	Life by Misadventure	Columbia	20 May 2021	2
499	Pink	All I Know So Far: Setlist	RCA	3 June 2021	1
500	Texas	Hi	BMG	10 June 2021	1
501	Wolf Alice	Blue Weekend	Dirty Hit	17 June 2021	1
502	Noel Gallagher's High Flying Birds	Back the Way We Came: Vol. 1 (2011–2021)	Sour Mash	24 June 2021	1
503	Griff	One Foot in Front of the Other	Warner	1 July 2021	1
504	Jack Savoretti	Europiana	EMI	8 July 2021	2
505	Football Classics Band	Footie Anthems	Crimson	22 July 2021	1
506	KSI	All Over the Place	BMG	29 July 2021	1
507	Various Artists	Now That's What I Call Music! 109	EMI/Universal	5 August 2021	1
508	Billie Eilish	Happier Than Ever	Interscope	12 August 2021	1
509	Will Young	Crying on the Bathroom Floor	Cooking Vinyl	19 August 2021	1
510	The Killers	Pressure Machine	EMI	26 August 2021	1
511	Lorde	Solar Power	EMI	2 September 2021	1
512	Kanye West	Donda	Def Jam	9 September 2021	1
513	Iron Maiden	Senjutsu	Parlophone	16 September 2021	1
514	Steps	What the Future Holds Pt. 2	BMG	23 September 2021	1
515	Lil Nas X	Montereo	Columbia	30 September 2021	1
516	Public Service Broadcasting	Bright Magic	Pias	7 October 2021	1
517	Grace Petrie	Connectivity	Robot Needs Home	14 October 2021	1
518	Sam Fender	Seventeen Going Under	Polydor	21 October 2021	1
519	Coldplay	Music of the Spheres	Parlophone	28 October 2021	1
520	Elton John	The Lockdown Sessions	EMI	4 November 2021	1
521	Ed Sheeran	=	Asylum	11 November 2021	1
522	ABBA	Voyage	Polar	18 November 2021	1
523	Taylor Swift	Red (Taylor's Version)	EMI	25 November 2021	1
524	Adele	30	Columbia	2 December 2021	3
525	Various Artists	Now That's What I Call Christmas (2021)	EMI/Universal	23 December 2021	2
2022
re	Ed Sheeran	=	Asylum	13 January 2022	2
526	The Weeknd	Dawn FM	Republic/XO	20 January 2022	1
527	Bonobo	Fragments	Ninja Tune	27 January 2022	1
528	Meat Loaf	Bat Out of Hell	Epic	3 February 2022	1
529	Jamie Webster	Moments	Modern Sky	10 February 2022	1
530	Bastille	Give Me the Future	Virgin	17 February 2022	1
531	Frank Turner	FTHC	Polydor	24 March 2022	1
532	Motion Picture Cast Recording	Encanto (soundtrack)	Walt Disney	3 March 2022	1
533	Tears for Fears	Tipping Point	Concord	10 March 2022	1
534	Stereophonics	Oochya!	Stylus	17 March 2022	1
535	Ghost	Impera	Loma Vista	24 March 2022	1
re	Motion Picture Cast Recording	Encanto (soundtrack)	Walt Disney	31 March 2022	1
536	Michael Bublé	Higher	Reprise	7 April 2022	1
537	Red Hot Chili Peppers	Unlimited Love	Warner	14 April 2022	1
538	Wet Leg	Wet Leg	Domino	21 April 2022	1
539	Various Artists	Now That's What I Call Music! 111	EMI/Universal	28 April 2022	1
540	Fontaines D.C.	Skinty Fia	Partisan	5 May 2022	1
541	Rammstein	Zeit	Spinefarm	12 May 2022	1
541	Arcade Fire	We	Columbia	19 May 2022	1
542	Florence and the Machine	Dance Fever	Polydor	26 May 2022	1
543	Harry Styles	Harry's House	Columbia	2 June 2022	1
544	Liam Gallagher	C'mon You Know	Warner	9 June 2022	1
545	Various Artists	Now That's What I Call Timeless	EMI/Universal	16 June 2022	1
546	George Ezra	Gold Rush Kid	Columbia	23 June 2022	2
547	Porcupine Tree	Closure/Continuation	Music For Nations	7 July 2022	1
548	Paolo Nutini	Last Night in the Bittersweet	Atlantic	14 July 2022	1
549	James Bay	Leap	EMI	21 July 2022	1
550	J-Hope	Jack in the Box	Big Hit	28 July 2022	1
551	Jamie T	The Theory of Whatever	Polydor	4 August 2022	1
552	Beyoncé	Renaissance	Columbia/Parkwood Entertainment	11 August 2022	1
553	Various Artists	Now That's What I Call Music! 112	EMI/Universal	18 August 2022	1
554	Kasabian	The Alchemist's Euphoria	Columbia	25 August 2022	1
555	Steps	Platinum Collection	Sony	1 September 2022	1
556	Muse	Will of the People	Warner	8 September 2022	1
557	Megadeth	The Sick, the Dying... and the Dead!	UMC	15 September 2022	1
558	Robbie Williams	XXV	Columbia	22 September 2022	1
559	Suede	Autofiction	BMG	29 September 2022	1
560	5 Seconds of Summer	5SOS5	BMG	6 October 2022	1
561	Slipknot	The End, So Far	Roadrunner	13 October 2022	1
562	RJ Thompson	Yearbook	Codename	20 October 2022	1
562	The 1975	Being Funny in a Foreign Language	Dirty Hit	27 October 2022	1
563	Taylor Swift	Midnights	EMI	3 November 2022	1
564	Massive Wagons	Triggered!	Earache	10 November 2022	1
565	Luke Evans	A Song for You	BMG	17 November 2022	1
566	Louis Tomlinson	Faith in the Future	BMG	24 November 2022	1
567	Various Artists	Now That's What I Call Music! 113	EMI/Universal	1 December 2022	1
568	Stormzy	This Is What I Mean	0207/Merky	8 December 2022	1
569	Various Artists	Now 100 Hits Christmas2022	EMI/Universal	15 December 2022	1
570	Sam Ryder	There's Nothing but Space, Man!	Parlophone	22 December 2022	1
re	Various Artists	Now 100 Hits Christmas2022	EMI/Universal	29 December 2022	2
2023
re	Sam Ryder	There's Nothing but Space, Man!	Parlophone	12 January 2023	1
571	Gabrielle Aplin	Phosphorescent	Never Fade	19 January 2023	1
572	Joesef	Permanent Damage	Bold Cut	26 January 2023	1
573	Black Star Riders	Wrong Side of Paradise	Earache	2 February 2023	1
574	Sam Smith	Gloria	Capitol	9 February 2023	1
575	Raye	My 21st Century Blues	Human Re Sources	16 February 2023	1
576	Paramore	This Is Why	Atlantic	23 February 2023	1
577	Pink	Trustfall †	RCA	2 March 2023	1
578	Obey Robots	One In A Thousand	My Big Sister Recordings	9 March 2023	1
579	Slowthai	Ugly	Method	16 March 2023	1
580	Miley Cyrus	Endless Summer Vacation	RCA	23 March 2023	1
581	U2	Songs of Surrender	Island	30 March 2023	1
582	Depeche Mode	Memento Mori	Columbia	6 April 2023	1
583	Ist Ist	Protagonists	Kind Violence	13 April 2023	1
re	Lewis Capaldi	Divinely Uninspired to a Hellish Extent	EMI	20 April 2023	1
584	Metallica	72 Seasons	Vertigo	27 April 2023	1
585	Everything but the Girl	Fuse	Buzzin' Fly	4 May 2023	1
586	The Lottery Winners	Anxiety Replacement Therapy	Modern Sky	11 May 2023	1
587	Ed Sheeran	-	Asylum	18 May 2023	2
588	Lewis Capaldi	Broken by Desire to Be Heavenly Sent	EMI	1 June 2023	2
589	Foo Fighters	But Here We Are	Columbia	15 June 2023	1
590	McFly	Power to Play	BMG	22 June 2023	1
591	Tom Grennan	What Ifs & Maybes	Insanity	29 June 2023	1
592	Elton John	Diamonds	Mercury/UMC	6 July 2023	1
593	Nothing But Thieves	Dead Club City	Sony	13 July 2023	1
594	Taylor Swift	Speak Now (Taylor's Version)	EMI	20 July 2023	1
595	Rita Ora	You & I	BMG	27 July 2023	1
596	As December Falls	Join the Club	ADF	3 August 2023	1
597	Various Artists	Now That's What I Call Music! 115	EMI/Universal	10 August 2022	1
598	Skindred	Smile	Earache	17 August 2023	1
599	Liam Gallagher	Knebworth 22	Warner	24 August 2023	1
600	Hozier	Unreal Unearth	Island	31 August 2023	1
601	Claire Richards	Euphoria	Edsel	7 September 2023	1
602	Royal Blood	Back to the Water Below	Warner	14 September 2023	1
603	V	Layover	Big Hit	21 September 2023	1
604	Busted	Greatest Hits 2.0	Juno	28 September 2023	1
605	Kylie Minogue	Tension	BMG	5 October 2023	1
606	Ed Sheeran	Autumn Variations	Gingerbread Man	12 October 2023	1
607	Roger Waters	The Dark Side of the Moon Redux	Cooking Vinyl	19 October 2023	1
608	Ren Gill	Sick Boi	The Other Songs	26 October 2023	1
609	The Rolling Stones	Hackney Diamonds	Polydor	2 November 2023	1
610	Taylor Swift	1989 (Taylor's Version)	EMI	9 November 2023	1
611	Jungkook	Golden	Big Hit	16 November 2023	1
612	James Marriott	Are We There Yet?	James Marriott	23 November 2023	1
613	Madness	Theatre of the Absurd Presents C'est la Vie	BMG	30 November 2023	1
614	Take That	This Life	EMI	7 December 2023	1
re	Various Artists	Now 100 Hits Christmas2022	EMI/Universal	14 December 2023	4
2024
re	Lewis Capaldi	Broken by Desire to Be Heavenly Sent	EMI	11 January 2024	1
615	Shed Seven	A Matter of Time	Cooking Vinyl	18 January 2024	2
616	Green Day	Saviors	Reprise	1 February 2024	1
617	James Arthur	Bitter Sweet Love	Columbia	8 February 2024	1
618	The Last Dinner Party	Prelude to Ecstasy	Island	15 February 2024	1
619	Kanye West and Ty Dolla Sign	Vultures 1	YZY	22 February 2024	1
620	Paloma Faith	The Glorification of Sadness	RCA	29 February 2024	1
621	Rod Stewart and Jools Holland	Swing Fever	East West/Rhino	7 March 2024	1
622	Liam Gallagher and John Squire	Liam Gallagher John Squire	Warner	14 March 2024	1
623	Grace Petrie	Build Something Better	Robot Needs Home	21 March 2024	1
624	Justin Timberlake	Everything I Thought It Was	RCA	28 March 2024	1
625	Elbow	Audio Vertigo	Polydor	4 April 2024	1
626	Beyoncé	Cowboy Carter	Parkwood/Columbia	11 April 2024	1
627	The Libertines	All Quiet on the Eastern Esplanade	EMI	18 April 2024	1
628	Kris Barras Band	Halo Effect	Earache	25 April 2024	1
629	Taylor Swift	The Tortured Poets Department	EMI	2 May 2024	2
630	Dua Lipa	Radical Optimism	Warner	16 May 2024	1
631	Kings of Leon	Can We Please Have Fun	Polydor	23 May 2024	1
632	Billie Eilish	Hit Me Hard and Soft	Interscope	30 May 2024	1
re	Taylor Swift	The Tortured Poets Department	EMI	6 June 2024	1
633	Becky Hill	Believe Me Now?	Polydor	13 June 2024	1
634	Bon Jovi	Forever	EMI	20 June 2024	1
635	Luke Combs	Fathers & Sons	Sony Music	27 June 2024	1
re	Taylor Swift	The Tortured Poets Department	EMI	4 July 2024	1
636	Imagine Dragons	Loom	Interscope	11 July 2024	1
637	Kasabian	Happenings	Columbia	18 July 2024	1
638	Eminem	The Death of Slim Shady (Coup de Grâce)	Interscope	25 July 2024	1
639	Los Campesinos!	All Hell	Heart Swells	1 August 2024	1
640	Various Artists	Now That's What I Call Music! 118	EMI/Universal	8 August 2024	1
641	Kanye West and Ty Dolla Sign	Vultures 2	YZY	15 August 2024	1
642	Will Young	Light It Up	BMG	22 August 2024	1
643	Scarlet Rebels	Where the Colours Meet	Earache	29 August 2024	1
644	Fontaines D.C.	Romance	XL	5 September 2024	1
645	Oasis	Definitely Maybe	Creation	12 September 2024	1
646	David Gilmour	Luck and Strange	Sony	19 September 2024	1
647	Snow Patrol	The Forest Is the Path	Polydor	26 September 2024	1
648	Blossoms	Gary	ODD SK Recordings	3 October 2024	1
649	Shed Seven	Liquid Gold	Cooking Vinyl	10 October 2024	1
650	Coldplay	Moon Music †	Parlophone	17 October 2024	2
651	Kylie Minogue	Tension II	BMG	31 October 2024	1
652	Amyl and the Sniffers	Cartoon Darkness	Rough Trade	7 November 2024	1
653	The Cure	Songs of a Lost World	Polydor	14 November 2024	1
654	Massive Wagons	Earth to Grace	Earache	21 November 2024	1
655	Linkin Park	From Zero	Warner	28 November 2024	1
656	Original Cast Recording	Wicked: The Soundtrack	Republic	5 December 2024	1
657	Various Artists	Now That's What I Call Christmas (2024)	EMI/Universal	12 December 2024	4
2025
658	Robbie Williams	Better Man Soundtrack	Columbia	9 January 2025	1
re	Original Cast Recording	Wicked: The Soundtrack	Republic	16 January 2025	1
659	Myles Smith	A Minute...	Sony Music	23 January 2025	1
660	David Gray	Dear Life	Laugh a Minute	30 January 2025	1
661	Teddy Swims	I've Tried Everything but Therapy (Part 2)	Atlantic	6 February 2025	1
662	The Weeknd	Hurry Up Tomorrow	Republic/XO	13 February 2025	1
663	Juliet's Not Dead	This World Is Ours	TMR Rock	20 February 2025	1
664	Manic Street Preachers	Critical Thinking	Columbia	27 February 2025	1
665	Sam Fender	People Watching	Polydor	6 March 2025	1
666	Architects	The Sky, the Earth & All Between	Epitaph	13 March 2025	1
667	Lady Gaga	Mayhem	Polydor	20 March 2025	1
668	Ricky Warwick	Blood Ties	Earache	27 March 2025	1
669	The Lottery Winners	Koko	Modern Sky	3 April 2025	1
670	The Darkness	Dreams on Toast	Cooking Vinyl	10 April 2025	1
671	Elton John and Brandi Carlile	Who Believes in Angels?	EMI	17 April 2025	1
672	Those Damn Crows	God Shaped Hole	Earache	24 April 2025	1
673	Davido	5ive	Columbia	1 May 2025	1
674	Ghost	Skeletá	Loma Vista	8 May 2025	1
675	Andy Bell	Ten Crowns	Crown Recordings	15 May 2025	1
676	Sleep Token	Even in Arcadia	RCA	22 May 2025	1
677	The Sherlocks	Everything Must Make Sense	Infectious	29 May 2025	1
678	When Rivers Meet	Addicted to You	One Road	5 June 2025	1
679	Miley Cyrus	Something Beautiful	Columbia	12 June 2025	1
680	Pulp	More	Rough Trade	19 June 2025	1
681	James Marriott	Don't Tell the Dog	AWAL	26 June 2025	1
682	Aitch	4	Infinitum	3 July 2025	1
683	Alanis Morissette	Jagged Little Pill	Maverick	10 July 2025	1
684	Oasis	(What's the Story) Morning Glory?	Creation	17 July 2025	1
685	Wet Leg	Moisturizer	Domino	24 July 2025	1
686	Panic Shack	Panic Shack	Brace Yourself	31 July 2025	1
687	The K's	Pretty on the Internet	LAB	7 August 2025	1
688	Gaz Brookfield	Waiting for Wisdom	Land Pirate	14 August 2025	1
689	Craig David	Commitment	Craig David	21 August 2025	1
690	As December Falls	Everything's On Fire But I'm Fine	ADF	28 August 2025	1
691	Wolf Alice	The Clearing	Columbia	4 September 2025	1
692	CMAT	Euro-Country	CMAT Baby/AWAL	11 September 2025	1
693	Suede	Antidepressants	BMG	18 September 2025	1
694	Ed Sheeran	Play	Asylum	25 September 2025	1
695	The Divine Comedy	Rainy Sunday Afternoon	The Divine Comedy	2 October 2025	1
696	Perrie	Perrie	Columbia	9 October 2025	1
697	Taylor Swift	The Life of a Showgirl †	EMI	16 October 2025	2
698	David Gilmour	The Luck and Strange Concerts	Sony Music	30 October 2025	1
699	Lily Allen	West End Girl	BMG	6 November 2025	1
700	Cat Burns	How to Be Human	RCA/Since 93	13 November 2025	1
701	Rosalía	Lux	Columbia	20 November 2025	1
702	Various Artists	Now That's What I Call Music! 122	EMI/Universal	27 November 2025	1
703	Original Cast Recording	Wicked: For Good – The Soundtrack	Republic	4 December 2025	1
re	Various Artists	Now That's What I Call Christmas (2024)	EMI/Universal	11 December 2025	1
704	Kylie Minogue	Kylie Christmas	Rhino	18 December 2025	1
re	Various Artists	Now That's What I Call Christmas (2024)	EMI/Universal	25 December 2025	2
2026
705	Olivia Dean	The Art of Loving	Capitol	8 January 2026	2
706	Blue	Reflections	Cooking Vinyl	22 January 2026	1
707	Nathan Evans and Saint Phnx	Angels' Share	EMI	29 January 2026	1
708	Louis Tomlinson	How Did I Get Here?	BMG	5 February 2026	1
709	Molotovs	Wasted on Youth	Marshall	12 February 2026	1
710	Crystal Tides	Toothpaste	Wipe Out Music	19 February 2026	1
711	U2	Days of Ash	Island	26 February 2026	1
712	Leigh-Anne	My Ego Told Me To	made in the 90s	5 March 2026	1
713	Bruno Mars	The Romantic	Atlantic	12 March 2026	1
714	Harry Styles	Kiss All the Time. Disco, Occasionally	Columbia	19 March 2026	2
715	BTS	Arirang	Big Hit	2 April 2026	1
716	Raye	This Music May Contain Hope	Human Re Sources	9 April 2026	1
717	U2	Easter Lily	Island	16 April 2026	1
718	Jack Savoretti	We Will Always Be the Way We Were	Lanza Music	23 April 2026	1
719	Jessie Ware	Superbloom	EMI	30 April 2026	1
720	Foo Fighters	Your Favorite Toy	Columbia	7 May 2026	1
721	Kneecap	Fenian	Heavenly	14 May 2026	1
722	The Covasettes	Honeymoon Forever	Lab	21 May 2026	1
723	Drake	Iceman	Republic/OVO	28 May 2026	1
724	Maisie Peters	Florescence	Atlantic/Gingerbread Man	4 June 2026	1
725	Boards of Canada	Inferno	Warp	11 June 2026	1
726	Evanescence	Sanctuary	Music for Nations	18 June 2026	1
727	Olivia Rodrigo	You Seem Pretty Sad for a Girl So in Love	Geffen	25 June 2026	1
728	Myles Smith	My Mess, My Heart, My Life	RCA	2 July 2026	1
729	Muse	The Wow! Signal	Warner	9 July 2026	1
730	Madonna	Confessions II	Warner	16 July 2026	1
731	Rolling Stones	Foreign Tongues	Polydor	23 July 2026	1
732	Gracie Abrams	Daughter from Hell	Intercope	30 July 2026	1
733	Charli XCX	Music, Fashion, Film	Atlantic	6 August 2026	1
734	Ariana Grande	Petal	Republic	13 August 2026	1
735	Flo	Therapy at the Club	EMI	20 August 2026	1
736	Jungle	Sunshine	Caiolo	27 August 2026	1
737	Dolly Parton	The Very Best of Dolly Parton	Sony	3 September 2026	1
738	Alex Warren	Wildchild	Atlantic	10 September 2026	1
re	Ariana Grande	Petal	Republic	17 September 2026	1
739	RØRY	Bloodletting	Sadcore	24 September 2026	1
740	The Cheap Thrills	Keep Cheap	Keep Cheap	1 October 2026	1
741	Keo	Put a smile on for Me	Island	8 October 2026	1
742	Blossoms	Songs from the Wedding Cake	Distiller	15 October 2026	1
743	Chase & Status	Generic Everything	Warner	22 October 2026	1
744	Fontaines D.C.	Dopamine Chamber	XL	29 October 2026	1
re	Raye	This Music May Contain Hope	Human Re Sources	5 November 2026	1
745	Nickelback	Everything Under the Sun	Nickelback	12 November 2026	1
746	James Blunt	Airplane Mode	Atlantic	19 November 2026	1

=== By artist ===
Ekeven artists have spent three or more weeks at the top of the UK Official Download Chart so far during the 2020s. The totals below do not include compilation albums credited to various artists.

Artist	Number-one albums	Weeks at number one
Taylor Swift	9	13
Ed Sheeran	4	7
Liam Gallagher	4	4
Kylie Minogue	4	4
Dua Lipa	1	3
Adele	1	3
Coldplay	2	3
Harry Styles	2	3
BTS	3	3
U2	3	3
Raye	2	3

=== By record label ===
Twenty record labels have spent three or more weeks at the top of the UK Official Download Chart so far during the 2020s. The totals below do not include compilation albums credited to various artists apart from soundtracks which are included.

Record label	Number-one albums	Weeks at number one
EMI	29	36
Columbia	27	33
BMG	20	20
Polydor	19	20
Warner	19	21
Atlantic	10	10
RCA	9	9
Earache	8	8
Cooking Vinyl	7	8
Interscope	7	8
Parlophone	5	7
Sony	7	7
Republic	6	7
Island	7	7
Big Hit	6	6
Asylum	3	6
Reprise	3	3
Modern Sky	3	3
Capitol	2	3
Human Re Sources	2	3

== See also ==
- List of UK Compilation Chart number ones of the 2020s
