= RJ Thompson discography =

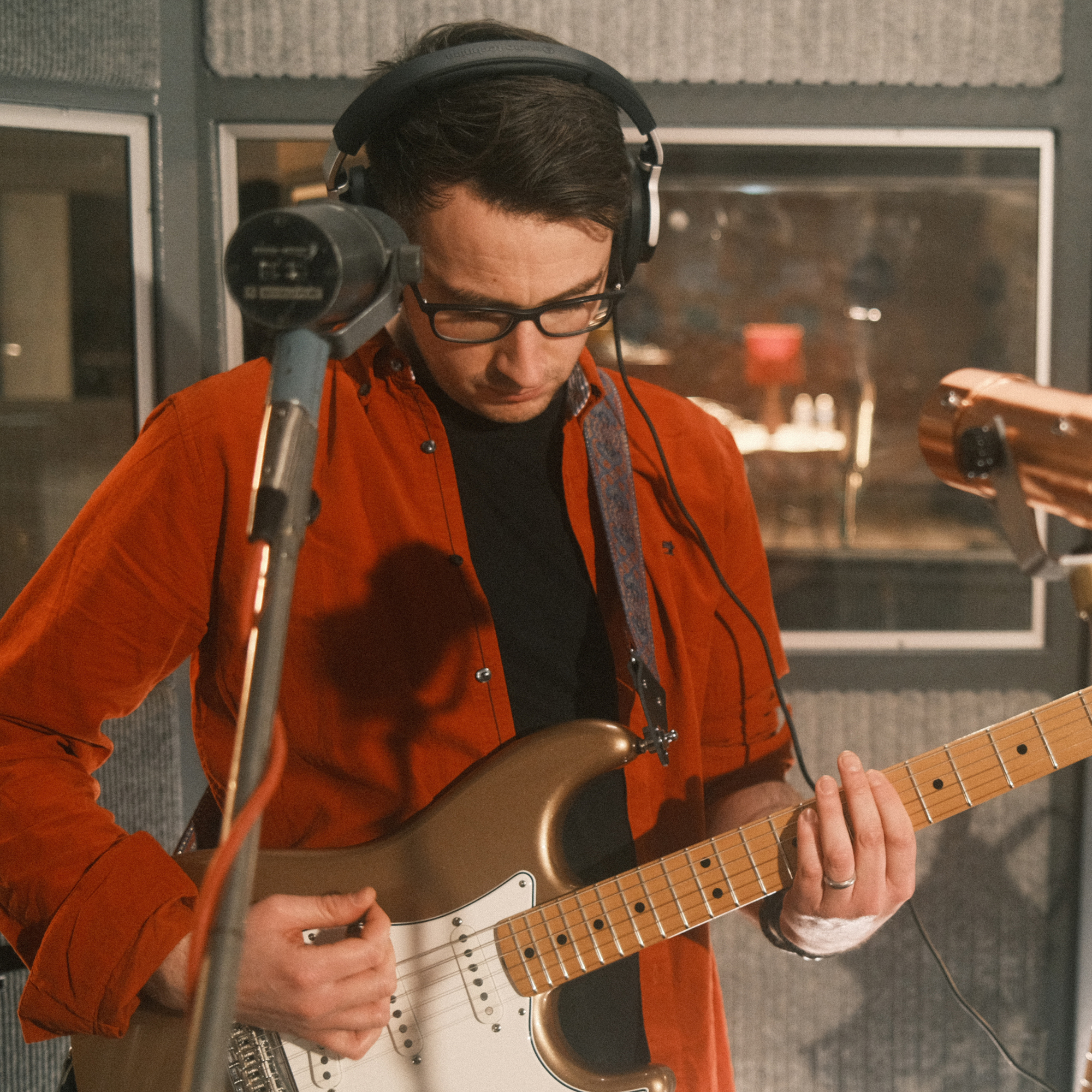
- RJ Thompson - Performing live at Abbey Road Studios
- Studio albums: 3
- EPs: 3
- Live albums: 2
- Singles: 22
- Music videos: 22

The discography of British singer-songwriter RJ Thompson consists of three studio albums, two live albums, one demo album, three extended plays and twenty-two singles.

His first releases, under his original name Richard John Thompson, were described by RJ as "a collections of demos". This included the 11-track Illogical Life, which was released on the iTunes Store on 10 July 2006, the 2007 Acoustic Sessions EP and the 2011The Cognitive Rules EP. The EP was mastered by Geoff Pesche at Abbey Road Studios.

In 2014, RJ shortened his stage name to avoid confusion with the famous folk singer Richard Thompson. His first official release as RJ Thompson was the single "The Numbers", which also featured a cover of Jimmy Webb's "Highwayman" as a B-side,. The House Upon the Hill EP followed on 24 November 2014 (mastered by Christian Wright at Abbey Road Studios). Thompson returned with his live album, simply titled Live, on 4 July 2016.

In November 2017, Thompson released his first official studio album, Echo Chamber.

In October 2020, Thompson released his second studio album Lifeline. In March 2021, the album received a physical release, after which the album placed at number five on the UK Albums Chart and number one on the UK Album Downloads Chart.

In October 2022, Thompson released his third studio album Yearbook. The album went on to land at number forty on the UK Albums Chart and number one on the UK Album Downloads Chart.

On 30th June 2023, Thompson released Live at Abbey Road, recorded live in Studio Two at Abbey Road Studios. The album landed at number sixteen on the UK Album Downloads Chart.

== Albums ==
=== Studio albums ===
List of studio albums
Title	Details	Peak chart positions	
Title	Details	UK	SCO
Echo Chamber	Released: 17 November 2017; Label: Chicken Wire, Codename; Format: Digital download, CD, LP	—	—
Lifeline	Released: 30 October 2020; Label: Codename; Format: CD, cassette, LP, digital download, streaming	5	3
Yearbook	Released: 7 October 2022; Label: Codename; Format: CD, cassette, LP, digital download, streaming	40	—

=== Live albums ===
List of live albums
Title	Details
Live	Released: 4 July 2016; Label: Chicken Wire; Format: Digital download, CD
Live at Abbey Road	Released: 20 June 2023; Label: Codename; Format: CD, cassette, LP, digital download, streaming

=== Demo albums ===
List of demo albums
Title	Details
Illogical Life	Released: 10 July 2006; Label: Chicken Wire; Format: Digital download, CD

== Extended plays ==
List of EPs
Title	Details
Acoustic Sessions EP	Released: 9 July 2007; Label: Chicken Wire; Format: Digital download, CD
The Cognitive Rules	Released: 4 December 2011; Label: Chicken Wire; Format: Digital download, CD
House Upon the Hill	Released: 24 November 2014; Label: Chicken Wire; Format: Digital download, CD

== Singles ==
List of singles
Title	Details
"A Better Life"	Released: 27 February 2011; Label: Chicken Wire; Format: Digital download
"When I Get Old"	Released: 17 July 2011; Label: Chicken Wire; Format: Digital download
"The Numbers"	Released: 1 June 2014; Label: Chicken Wire; Format: Digital download, CD
"The Times They Are A-Changin’"	Released: 3 February 2017; Label: Codename; Format: Digital download, streaming
"London"	Released: 12 May 2017; Label: Codename; Format: Digital download, streaming
"Echo Chamber"	Released: 25 August 2017; Label: Codename; Format: Digital download, streaming
"Blackout Windows"	Released: 24 October 2017; Label: Codename; Format: Digital download, streaming
"The Girl & The Gunman"	Released: 22 September 2017; Label: Codename; Format: Digital download, streaming
"Skimming Stones"	Released: 8 December 2017; Label: Codename; Format: Digital download, streaming
"Kids"	Released: 5 February 2020; Label: Codename; Format: Digital download, streaming
"So Right"	Released: 3 April 2020; Label: Codename; Format: Digital download, streaming
"Forget About The Day"	Released: 1 July 2020; Label: Codename; Format: Digital download, streaming
"Act Of God"	Released: 23 July 2020; Label: Codename; Format: Digital download, streaming
"Your Money Or Your Life"	Released: 11 May 2022; Label: Codename; Format: Digital download, streaming
"Super 8"	Released: 24 June 2022; Label: Codename; Format: Digital download, streaming
"Feel Alive"	Released: 13 July 2022; Label: Codename; Format: Digital download, streaming
"Rescue You"	Released: 24 August 2022; Label: Codename; Format: Digital download, streaming
"Forest Fires"	Released: 23 September 2022; Label: Codename; Format: Digital download, streaming
"You Can’t Always Get What You Want (Live at Abbey Road)"	Released: 25 April 2023; Label: Codename; Format: Digital download, streaming
"Headspace (Live at Abbey Road)"	Released: 26 May 2023; Label: Codename; Format: Digital download, streaming
"Feel Alive (Live at Abbey Road)"	Released: 16 June 2023; Label: Codename; Format: Digital download, streaming
"Super 8 (Live at Abbey Road)"	Released: 23 June 2023; Label: Codename; Format: Digital download, streaming
