= Stone Broken =

British rock band

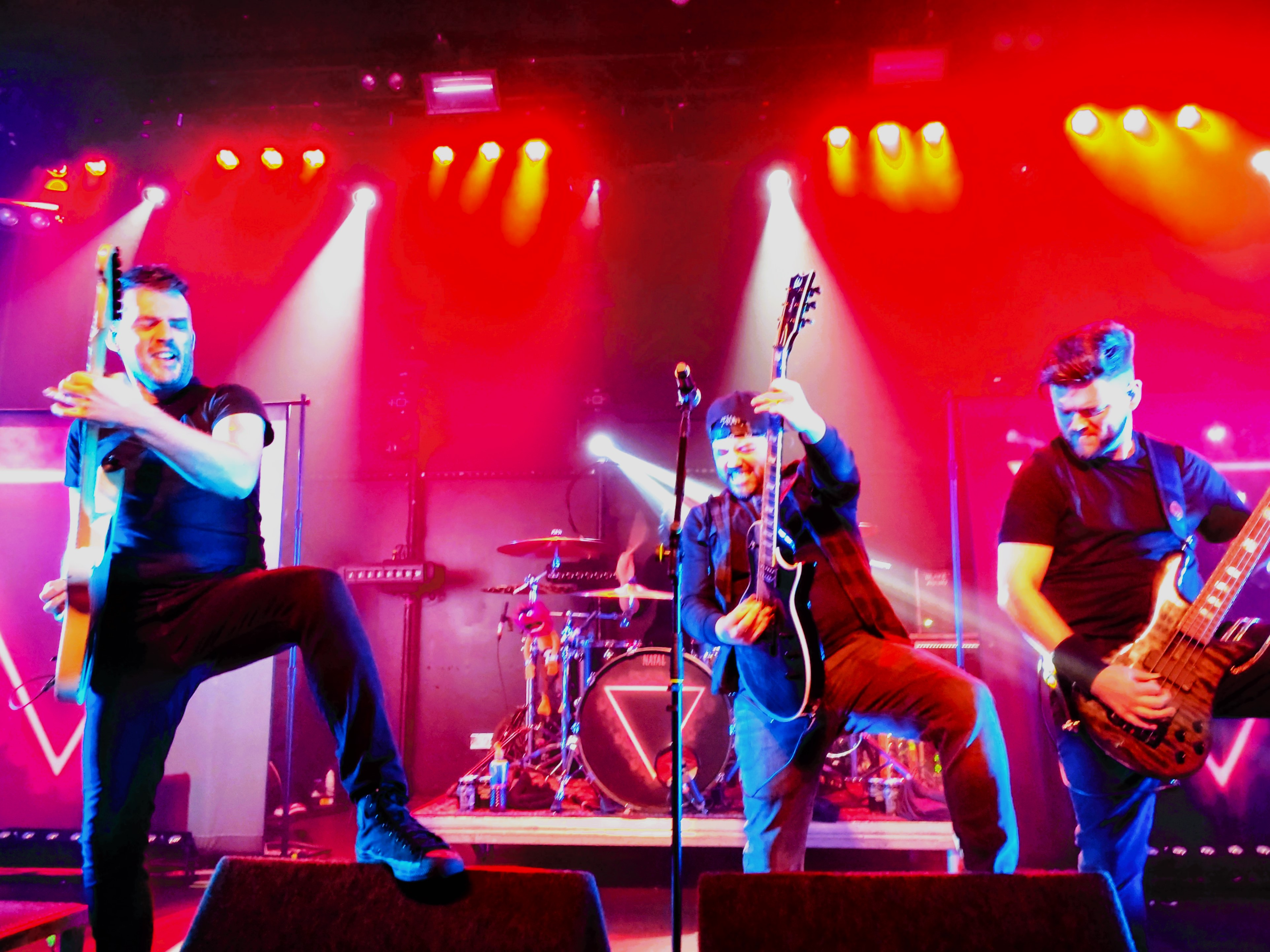
- Stone Broken, Nottingham, 2023

Background information
- Origin: Walsall, West Midlands, England
- Genres: Hard Rock, Alternative Rock
- Years active: 2013–present
- Label: 7Hz Productions
- Members: Rich Moss; Robyn Haycock; Chris Davis; Kieron Conroy
- Website: stonebroken.com

Stone Broken are a British rock band, formed in 2013. The band are based in Walsall, West Midlands, England. Stone Broken comprises Rich Moss, vocals and guitar, Chris Davis, lead guitar, Robyn Haycock, drums and backing vocals, and Kieron Conroy, bass.

The band self-released their debut EP, The Crow Flies, in 2014. Their first album, All In Time, was released independently in January 2016. Having signed to the Frontiers Records label later that year, the contract was subsequently dissolved and Stone Broken signed to the Spinefarm Records label in 2017. In 2018, the band released their second album, Ain’t Always Easy. In late 2019, the debut album was re-issued on Spinefarm, and included a re-recording of their best known song, "Wait For You". The band's third album, Revelation, was released in April 2022. In July 2023 Stone Broken parted company with Spinefarm Records and signed to 7 Hz Productions.

== History ==
Stone Broken were formed in early 2013 when Richard Moss and Robyn Haycock decided to start a new band following the death from alcohol addiction of the guitar player with whom they had been planning to start a band called Black Lake. They were joined by bass player Kieron Conroy, who had previously been in a band called Black Diamond Bullet. Kieron introduced his new bandmates to guitarist Chris Davis, who had also played in Black Diamond Bullet. The name Stone Broken was decided upon after drummer Robyn noted that the money required to get the band established would in all probability leave them ‘stone broke’.

Stone Broken spent the first year writing material and refining their sound. They recorded a two-track promotional single towards the end of 2013 featuring the tracks "This Life" and "Fall Back Down", the latter available to download from their official website. However, it was not until March 2014 that Stone Broken played their first public gig supporting a Motorhead tribute band at the Route 44 venue in Birmingham. The band approached producer Romesh Dodangoda at Long Wave Studios in South Wales to produce a debut EP consisting of five original tracks. This EP, The Crow Flies, was self-released in October 2014, supported by a music performance video for the track "Let Me Go".

The band played further shows in the first part of 2015 and returned to Long Wave Studios with a view to recording a second EP, to feature another five tracks. However, when the new recordings were completed, it was decided to collate an album from the ten songs recorded to date. By October 2015, Stone Broken signed a management deal with Peter Keevil of TMR Band Management. A month later the band announced that their debut album, entitled All In Time, was to be released worldwide on 29 January 2016. All In Time featured 10 tracks, produced and remastered by Romesh Dodangoda. Stone Broken released "Stay All Night" as the first official single from All In Time on 27 November 2015. It was accompanied by a video produced by Video Ink. The release was named single of the week on Kerrang! Radio and was daytime playlisted on DAB station, Planet Rock. The follow-up single, "Not Your Enemy", was added to the ‘A Playlist’ on Planet Rock and the ‘B Playlist’ on Kerrang! Radio. All the band's subsequent single releases have been ‘A-listed’ on Planet Rock radio. On 16 May, Stone Broken released their third single from All In Time, a track called "Better".

Stone Broken were voted as runners-up in the ‘Best New Band’ category of the annual Planet Rock Awards 2016. On 1 August 2016, Stone Broken announced that they had signed a worldwide, multi-album deal with Frontiers Music, with the band's second album to be released in 2017. The final single from the debut album was "Wait For You", released on 30 September 2016.

The year had started with more support shows in small venues, but by mid-year Stone Broken were playing bigger halls supporting better known acts such as Inglorious and FM. Towards the end of the year the band played a lengthy series of nationwide headline shows. At the beginning of 2017, Stone Broken commenced a European tour supporting Glenn Hughes, after which the band entered Long Wave Recording Studios in Cardiff to work again with All In Time producer Romesh Dodangoda.

In early 2017, Stone Broken left TMR and joined up with the London-based JABA Music Management group. Further high-profile support slots saw Stone Broken paired with Cheap Trick and then Living Colour for a number of UK shows in 2017, as well as appearing at major festivals including Steelhouse Festival, Ramblin’ Man Fair and Download Festival. The contract with Frontiers was terminated by mutual agreement in July 2017 but, by October, the band had signed to the Spinefarm Records label. The result, the 11 track Ain't Always Easy, was released via Spinefarm Records in March 2018, in the midst of another major headlining tour of the UK and Europe. A deluxe version was issued with four bonus tracks, and the album was also released on vinyl. The first single was called "Worth Fighting For". The album reached No. 37 on the UK Albums Chart. It also saw release in the United States in April 2018 and the band subsequently announced their first American tour, supporting Fozzy and playing additional headline and festival dates over a two-month period.

The second single from Ain't Always Easy was "Heartbeat Away", which was supported by a video produced by Mockingbird Film Company, tackling the subject of domestic abuse. On 21 April, Spinefarm produced a limited edition re-issue of the All In Time album as a vinyl picture disc for Record Store Day in the UK. The band was also featured in a Psychology Today article, and profiled on Music Radar.

A third track "Doesn't Matter" from the second album was released to radio stations in May. Meanwhile, the band appeared at Download Paris, the Graspop Metal Meeting festival in Belgium, and headlined the first night of 2018's Steelhouse Festival in Wales.

Further headline tour dates followed in December 2018, predominantly in mainland Europe, after which an extensive UK headlining tour was announced for the following February. To coincide with the domestic dates, a further single was released from Ain't Always Easy, "The Only Thing I Need", with accompanying video and limited edition CD. Following the tour, the band decided to take some time off the road to write material for their third album, scheduled for release in 2020. However, they subsequently announced two further support tours, with Black Stone Cherry in Europe in July, and with Black Star Riders in the UK in October. The band also appeared at the Belladrum Tartan Heart Festival in Scotland in August 2019 and were featured on BBC TV.

In August 2019, it was announced that the debut independent album release, All In Time, was going to be re-issued on 11 October on the Spinefarm label, and would include six bonus tracks including a new version of the band's most popular song, "Wait For You", with an orchestral backing.

In December 2019, the band started recording their third album with producer Dan Weller, with release originally scheduled for 2020. Planned festival appearances for 2020 were disrupted by the COVID-19 pandemic. In July 2020, the band live-streamed a performance for Planet Rock from The Asylum venue in Birmingham, and announced a UK headline tour for April 2021 in support of their forthcoming album. In August 2020, it was announced that Stone Broken would be performing at the 2021 Download Festival, though the event would subsequently be cancelled due to the ongoing COVID-19 pandemic. With the pandemic continuing to disrupt the music industry, in January 2021 it was announced that the 'Revelation Tour' was to be postponed until January/February 2022. In May 2021, it was announced that a Download Pilot event would take place at Donington in June, and that Stone Broken would perform at this event. With covid restrictions being further relaxed, in July it was announced that Stone Broken would perform at the Steelhouse Festival in Wales. The band's third album, to be called Revelation, was scheduled for release to coincide with the tour, but was delayed until April 2022. The tour was also subsequently rescheduled for April 2022 as pandemic restrictions were revised again. The album's title track was announced as its debut single, which was released in January 2022. A second single from the album, "Black Sunrise", was released in February. A third, "The Devil You Know", was released in April 2022. The band's corresponding 'Revelation' UK Tour took place in April and May 2022.

In the summer of 2022 Stone Broken performed at the Firestorm and Stonedead festivals. Towards the end of the year they played at Planet Rockstock and headlined their own Christmas Bash in Wolverhampton.

In early 2023 Stone Broken headlined the 'Come Closer' UK Tour of smaller venues and issued an expanded digital deluxe edition of their most recent album.

A fourth single from Revelation, "Stronger", was released with a supporting video in February 2023.

In July 2023 it was announced that Stone Broken had left Spinefarm Records and signed to 7 Hz Productions. Furthermore, the band was to headline the 2024 Winter's End festival in South Wales.

== Members ==
Current members

- Rich Moss – lead vocals, rhythm/lead guitar (2013–present)
- Chris Davis – lead guitar, backing vocals (2013–present)
- Kieron Conroy – bass guitar (2013–present)
- Robyn Haycock – drums, backing vocals (2013–present)

== Discography ==
Studio albums

- All in Time (2016) (Reissue released in 2019)
- Ain't Always Easy (2018) – UK No. 37
- Revelation (2022) – UK No. 27

EPs

- The Crow Flies (2014)
