= Earache Records =

British record label

- Founded: 1985
- Founder: Digby Pearson
- Status: Active
- Distributor: ADA
- Genre: Heavy metal; thrash metal; death metal; extreme metal; experimental; hardcore punk; hard rock
- Country of origin: United Kingdom
- Location: Nottingham, England
- Official website: www.earache.com

Earache Records is a British independent record label, music publisher and management company founded by Digby Pearson in 1985, based in Nottingham, England, with offices in London and New York. The label helped to pioneer extreme metal by releasing early grindcore and death metal records between the late 1980s and mid-1990s. Its roster has since diversified into more mainstream guitar music, working with bands such as Rival Sons, The Temperance Movement, Blackberry Smoke, Scarlet Rebels and the White Buffalo. The company also hosted the 'Earache Express' stage at Glastonbury Festival in 2017 and 'The Earache Factory' at Boomtown 2018. The label's logo is a homage to Thrasher magazine, as Pearson was a skateboard culture enthusiast.

== History ==
Earache was founded in 1985 by Digby Pearson who prior to launching the label proper had self-released 'Anglican Scrape Attic', a compilation of hardcore punk and early crossover thrash acts which included Hirax, Lipcream and Concrete Sox. The first official Earache release on vinyl in 1987 with catalogue number MOSH 1, was The Accüsed's The Return of Martha Splatterhead. This was followed by a split LP by the crust/crossover band Concrete Sox and the proto-grind band Heresy. The label's first major release of note was MOSH 3, Napalm Death's Scum. Famously, John Peel was a champion of the band and supported them on BBC Radio 1. The record went on to reach number 7 in the UK indie chart. Following this, Earache released music by many bands from the emerging grindcore and death metal scenes, such as Morbid Angel, Carcass, Entombed, Bolt Thrower and Terrorizer.

Although intrinsically linked with death metal, the label's catalogue is varied and also includes Welsh ragga-metal act Dub War, Birmingham's industrial metal pioneers Godflesh, Nottingham's Pitchshifter, hardcore techno outfit Ultraviolence, Mick Harris's industrial/experimental group Scorn, John Zorn-led experimental group Naked City and doom and sludge metal bands Sleep and Acid Bath.

In the early 1990s Columbia Records, seeking to break into metal, signed a deal with Earache. Columbia would license rights and market and distribute them in The Americas, with rights reverting to Earache upon completion of the deal term. It is widely accepted that Columbia failed to deliver the expected sales that they themselves had projected and thus they sought to prematurely terminate the agreement. Barney Greenway of Napalm Death objected to the deal with Columbia (a subsidiary of Sony Music) on the basis that it was "selling out", although Napalm Death have since released music also distributed by Columbia parent Sony Music Entertainment. The rights to all Columbia-licensed titles have since reverted to Earache, who thereafter have been wholly independent, working with distributors as opposed to licensees.

The label has a number of subsidiary labels, including Wicked World Records, Elitist Records, Sub Bass Records and the short-lived Necrosis Records.

== Modern era ==
As with many labels, Earache has transitioned over time from its initial "extreme" output and now focuses primarily on modern, accomplished guitar projects. Rival Sons were the most notable of the modern crop of artists, before signing with Atlantic Records in 2018. Newer signings include Australia's Massive, Nottingham's Haggard Cat and Lancaster's Massive Wagons. More recent grindcore and death metal signings include Wormrot and Deicide.

Earache also signed the first independent label direct deal with iTunes shortly after the service launched.

Earache currently holds the Guinness World Records for the "Shortest music video". Until 2000, the record was held by Napalm Death's 10-second video for "The Kill", which was broadcast on the German music channel VIVA. In the 2001 edition, the record was replaced by Brutal Truth. Their video for the song "Collateral Damage" lasts only 2.18 seconds.

In 2015, Digby Pearson received the Association of Independent Music Pioneer award.

In 2018, tech sitcom Silicon Valley featured "You Suffer" repeatedly in one episode. In response the label created a Twitter bot (@NapalmDeathBot) which sends an hourly tweet with the price of bitcoin. They also inserted "You suffer" into the blockchain, a first for a label.

In August 2018, Earache signed trap/rap artist ALIREZA301. Alireza is a metal influenced rapper from Maryland who performs a style of trap/rap which in parts heavily incorporates guitars.

Earache's newer rock signings have achieved Top 15 positions in the UK charts, including: a #6 album with The Temperance Movement's A Deeper Cut (2018), a #8 album with Blackberry Smoke's Find a Light (2018), a #9 album with Massive Wagons' House of Noise (2020), a #13 album with Rival Sons' Hollow Bones (2016) and a #14 album with Those Damn Crows' Point Of No Return (2020).

To begin the new decade, Earache Records announced a compilation vinyl titled "The New wave of Rock N Roll" featuring a host of new acts.

== Earache Live ==
In 2017, Earache were invited to host the first ever stage for heavy music at Glastonbury Festival. 'The Earache Express' was a recycled London underground tube carriage located in the 'Shangri La' area of the site. The stage featured performances from Napalm Death, The Dead Kennedys, Ho99o9, Hacktivist, Glen Matlock of The Sex Pistols, Steve Ignorant of Crass and Wormrot amongst others.

Having been well received by Glastonbury Festival, Boomtown (who are affiliated to Glastonbury) invited Earache to curate a stage at their 2018 event which took place in Winchester during August 2018. The stage (named The Earache Factory) was designed around the concept of a disused factory within a run-down part of a futuristic town. It featured artists such as Soulfly, Dead Kennedys and Enter Shikari not to mention a headline set by British upstarts Idles.

In 2019, Earache will be hosting an evening at Camp Bestival in Dorset bringing along Napalm Death, Lawnmower Deth, Diamond Head, Phil Campbell & The Bastard Sons and Nosebleed.

== Official Charts Top 40 albums ==
Artist	Album title	Chart Position
Skindred	You Got This	1
Those Damn Crows	God Shaped Hole	1
Skindred	Smile	2
Those Damn Crows	Inhale/Exhale	3
Massive Wagons	Earth To Grace	4
Kris Barras Band	Halo Effect	5
The Temperance Movement	A Deeper Cut	6
Massive Wagons	Triggered	6
Black Star Riders	Wrong Side Of Paradise	6
Scarlet Rebels	See Through Blue	7
Blackberry Smoke	Like An Arrow	8
Massive Wagons	House Of Noise	9
The Temperance Movement	New Promise Land Incorporated	11
The Temperance Movement	The Temperance Movement	12
Blackberry Smoke	Find A Light	12
Rival Sons	Hollow Bones	13
Rival Sons	Great Western Valkyrie	14
Those Damn Crows	Point Of No Return	14
Scarlet Rebels	Where The Colours Meet	15
Various Artists	Piano That Rocks	15
Massive Wagons	Full Nelson	16
Blackberry Smoke	Holding All The Roses	17
Scarlet Rebels	Flawed By Design	17
The Temperance Movement	White Bear	18
The Karma Effect	Promised Land	19
Kris Barras Band	Monsters We Made	21
Ricky Warwick	Blood Ties	25
The Dust Coda	Mojo Skyline	27
Ricky Warwick	Fire & Vengeance	28
Blackberry Smoke	The Whippoorwill	30
Buckcherry	Hellbound	30
Rival Sons	Head Down	31
Goodbye June	See Where The Night Goes	33
Blackberry Smoke	Leave A Scar - Live In North Carolina	35
The Temperance Movement	Caught On Stage - Live & Acoustic	35
The Dust Coda	Loco Paradise	36
The Temperance Movement	Covers & Rarities	38
The Karma Effect	Cruel Intentions	39

== Criticism ==
Over the years, the relationship between the label and some of its former artists have become fraught, and Pearson has made a number of disparaging blog posts about, among others, JS Clayden from Pitchshifter and Barney Greenway of Napalm Death. Greenway responded that Pearson "expects everybody to be subservient", while Clayden called Pearson "petty and vindictive" and criticized the label for not allowing fans to stream or purchase Pitchshifter's albums that were released on Earache. In the documentary Slave to the Grind, Scott Carlson from Repulsion accused Earache of not paying the band, adding "I'm sure they sold way more records than they told us they did." Former Iron Monkey drummer Justin Greaves accused Earache of refusing to support the band financially in an emergency when during a European tour, singer Johnny Morrow fell sick and needed to return to the UK, which the band couldn't afford to cover. Godflesh's Justin Broadrick also complained about Earache's "hostile way of treating artists — which is essentially like shit".

== Notable artists ==
- Adema (2005–2006)
- Akercocke
- Anaal Nathrakh
- Anata
- Annihilator (for Europe)
- Arsis
- At the Gates
- Anal Cunt (1994-2000)
- Beecher
- The Berzerker
- Biomechanical
- Biters
- Blackberry Smoke (European Deal)
- Black Star Riders
- Blood Red Throne
- Bolt Thrower (1989–1997)
- Bonded By Blood
- The Browning
- Bring Me the Horizon
- Brutal Truth
- Buckcherry
- Cadaver
- Candiria
- Carcass (1987–1996)
- Carnage
- Carnival in Coal
- Capharnaum
- Cathedral
- Cauldron
- Cerebral Bore
- The Chasm
- Circle of Dead Children
- Clutch
- Coalesce
- Concrete Sox
- Confessor
- Cult of Luna (2003–2009)
- Decapitated
- December Wolves
- Deicide (2002–2008)
- DJ Hyper
- Dub War
- Electric Callboy
- Enforcer
- Entombed (1989–1996)
- Ephel Duath
- Evile
- Ewigkeit
- Extreme Noise Terror
- Forest Stream
- Frantic Bleep
- Fudge Tunnel
- Gama Bomb
- Godflesh (1989–2000)
- Goodbye June
- Hate Eternal
- Haggard Cat
- The Haunted
- Hellbastard
- Heresy
- Hour of 13
- Ignominious Incarceration
- Insision
- Iron Monkey
- Janus Stark
- Johnny Violent
- Kagoule
- Lawnmower Deth
- Linea 77
- Love and Death
- Massacre
- Massive
- Massive Wagons
- Misery Loves Co.
- Misfits
- Morbid Angel (1988–2004)
- Mortiis
- Municipal Waste
- Naked City
- Napalm Death (1986–1999)
- Neuraxis
- Nocturnus (1989–1993)
- Oceano (2008–2016)
- OLD
- Ol Drake
- Order of Ennead
- Painkiller
- Pitchshifter (1992–1996)
- Pulkas
- Rival Sons (2009–2018)
- Savage Messiah
- Scarlet Rebels
- Severe Torture
- Scorn
- Society 1
- Sore Throat
- Short Sharp Shock
- Skindred
- Sleep
- Tallah
- Terrorizer (1988-1989)
- The Dust Coda
- The Glorious Sons (Europe and Japan)
- The Soulless
- The Temperance Movement
- Those Damn Crows
- Travis Meadows
- Ultraviolence
- Vader
- Vektor
- Violator
- Wakrat
- Woods of Ypres
- The White Buffalo (European Deal)
- White Wizzard
- With Passion
- Wormrot
- Danny Worsnop

== See also ==
- Category:Earache Records albums
- List of record labels
