= Steelhouse Festival =

Annual rock music festival in Aberbeeg, Wales

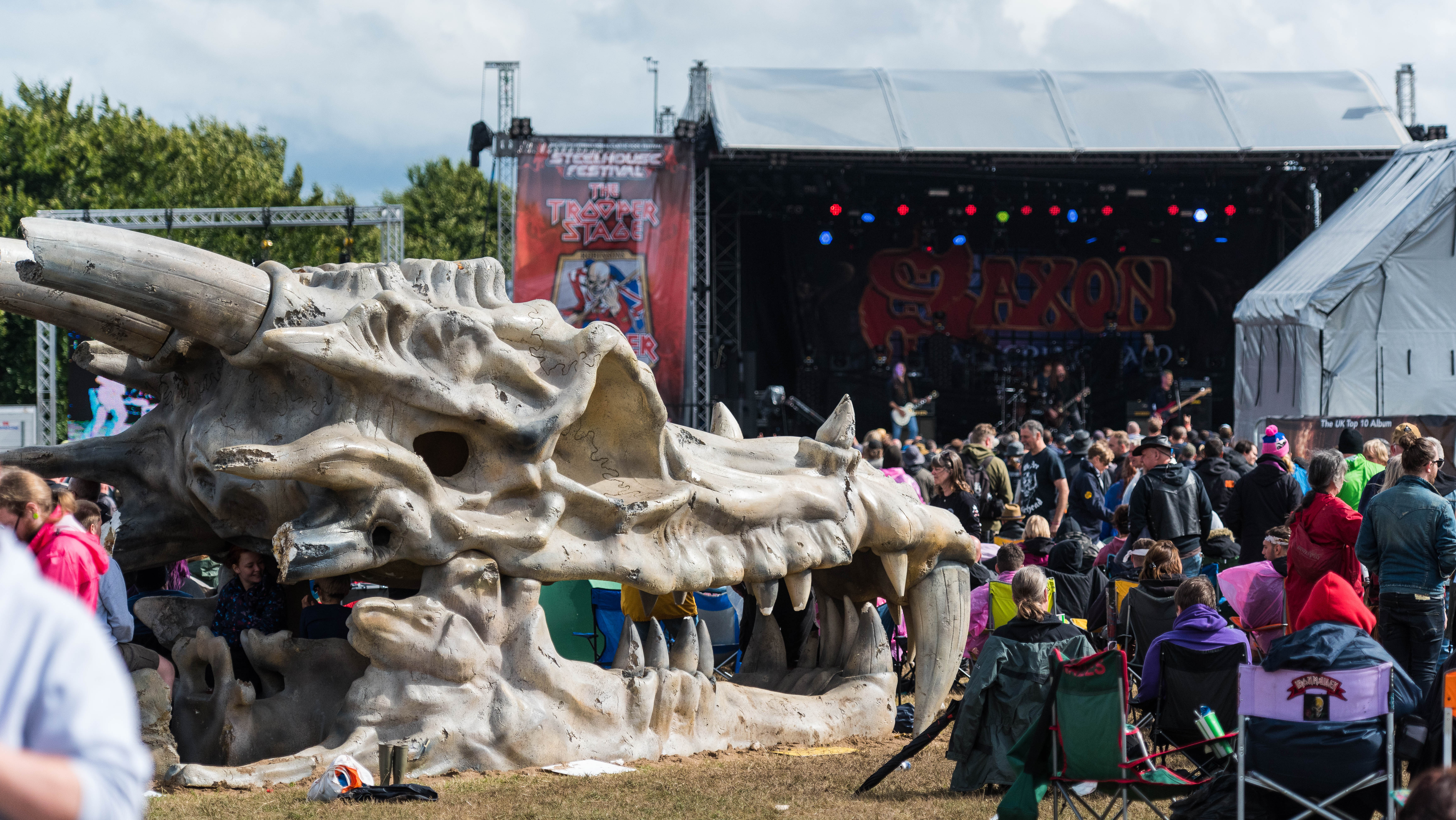
- Status: Active
- Genre: Music festival
- Frequency: Annually, (late July)
- Locations: Ebbw Vale, Wales
- Coordinates: 51.726°N 3.158°W
- Years active: 16 years
- Attendance: 6,000 (2023)
- Website: www.steelhousefestival.com

Steelhouse Festival is an independent rock festival held annually in late July at Aberbeeg in South Wales, U.K.

== History ==
Located on the edge of the Brecon Beacons, the event has been running since 2011 and is supported by the Welsh Government.

The festival is held in a mountain location making it the highest-recorded official altitude for any music festival in the UK.

Many acts have performed at the festival since its inception, particularly from the hard-rock, classic-rock and heavy-metal genres. Rock acts such as Reef, Feeder, Saxon, Europe, Rival Sons, Black Star Riders, Thunder, UFO, Glenn Hughes, Thin Lizzy, Uriah Heep, Myles Kennedy, Skindred, The Darkness, Airbourne, Black Stone Cherry, Those Damn Crows, Elegant Weapons, Kris Barras Band and Y&T have all appeared at one time or another.

The compere is Darren Redick, a presenter on Planet Rock.

Audiences in the region of around 6,000 have been recorded for daily attendances in recent years.

== Location ==
Hafod-y-dafal Farm, Aberbeeg, Ebbw Vale, Blaenau Gwent, NP13 2ER, Wales
