= Magic Valley (album) =

Studio album by Goodbye June
- Released: May 5, 2017
- Genre: Blues rock, hard rock, psychedelic rock, southern rock
- Length: 39:56
- Label: Interscope

Goodbye June chronology
Danger In the Morning (2016)	Magic Valley (2017)	Community Inn (2019)

Singles from Magic Valley
- 1. "Oh No" Released: April 1, 2016; 2. "Darlin'" Released: July 15, 2016; 3. "Daisy" Released: September 2, 2016

Magic Valley is the debut studio album by American hard rock band, Goodbye June. The album was released on May 5, 2017, through Interscope.

== Track listing ==
All lyrics are written by Landon Milbourn, Tyler Baker, and Brandon Qualkenbush; all music is composed by Goodbye June.

No.	Title	Length
1.	"Bamboozler"	2:42
2.	"Oh No"	3:41
3.	"Daisy"	3:05
4.	"Good Side"	3:25
5.	"Darlin'"	5:00
6.	"Charge Up The Power"	3:15
7.	"Bad Things"	3:06
8.	"Riding"	3:49
9.	"Goldmaker"	3:00
10.	"You Don't Love Me Like Before"	4:07
11.	"Fear Of Jesus"	4:51
Total length:		39:56

Bonus track
No.	Title	Length
12.	"Liberty Mother"	2:28

== Charts ==
Oh No (single)

Chart (2018)	Peak position
US Mainstream Rock (Billboard)	30
