= December Wolves =

American black metal band

- Origin: Wilmington, Massachusetts, United States
- Genre: Black metal
- Years active: 1993–present
- Labels: Wicked World Records, Earache Records, Hammerheart
- Members: Brian Oblivion; Smails; Scott DeFusco
- Past members: Joe Martignetti; Tim Donovan; Jeff Beckwith; Mike Beckwith; Brian Bergeron; JaBa^{Note A}

December Wolves are an American, Wilmington, Massachusetts-based black metal band, which was formed in 1993. Their first demo appeared in 1994. So far December Wolves has released three albums. On newer material the group goes in a more experimental/industrial 'post-black' direction. They are currently working on new material.

== Discography ==
Track listing

Wolftread (Self-Released, 1994) Track listing

1. Towers... (Intro)
2. The Towers of My Stone Cold Dwelling Over the Mountains and Cliffside Landscapes
3. 'Neath Our War Hammer
4. Throughout the Midnight Mist

Til Ten Years (Hammerheart Records, 1995) Track listing

1. Ode To The Master Therion
2. The Night That I Died
3. Our Centuries Have Been Found
4. Lycanthropy: Yonder Through Ice Storms
5. Til Ten Years
6. When The Clouds Cry
7. Outro

We Are Everywhere (Promotional EP) (Hammerheart Records, 1997) Track listing

1. We Are Everywhere
2. Not of Tainted Blood

Completely Dehumanized (Wicked World Records, 1998) Track listing

1. Conditioned By The Thoughts That I Transmit To You
2. Completely Dehumanised
3. We Are Everywhere
4. Time Flies When You Wish You Were Dead
5. Friday The 13th
6. The Gard Division
7. My Bible
8. Not With Tainted Blood
9. To Kill Without Emotion

Blasterpiece Theatre (Earache Records, 2002) Track listing

1. Warning
2. Desperately Seeking Satan
3. April Fools' Day
4. Do Not Entry
5. Kolobos
6. Porn Again Christian
7. Public Aquarian Freebase
8. Solid Gold Beating
9. Sharing Needles
10. Disclaimer
11. To Kill ... Again
