= Massive (band) =

Music band

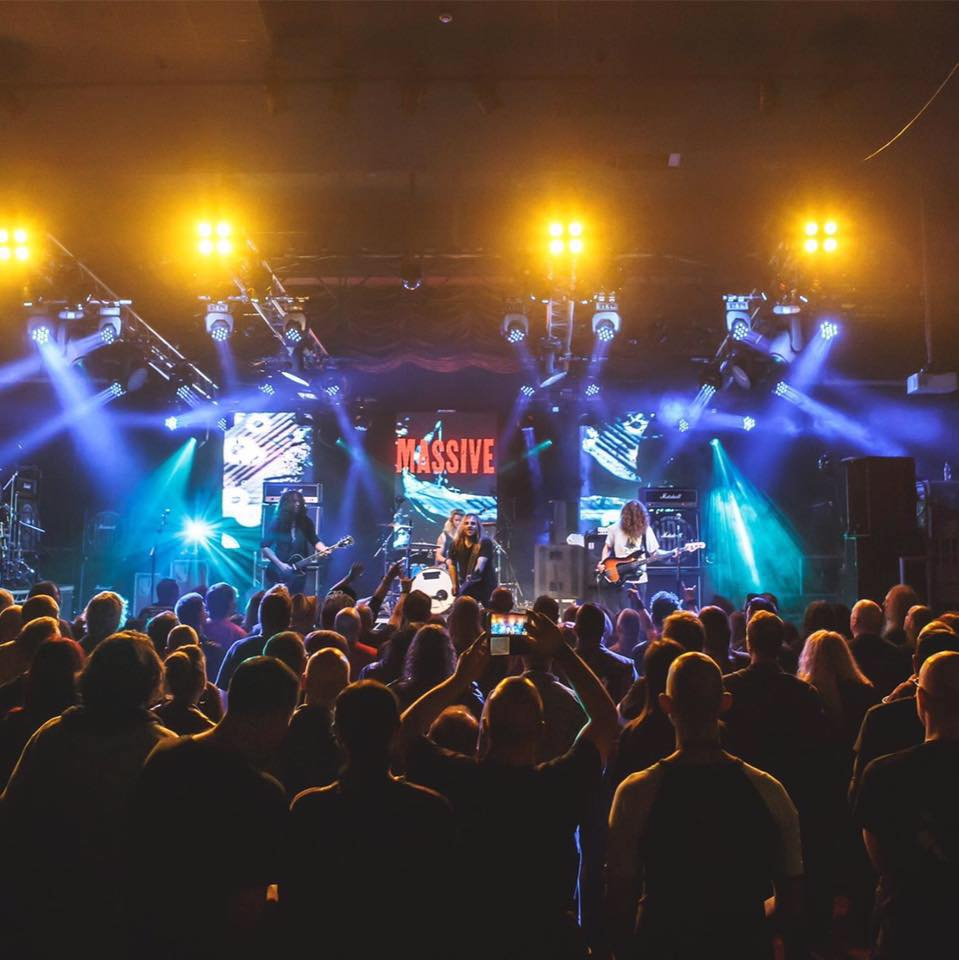
- Massive live 2016

Background information
- Origin: Melbourne
- Genres: Hard rock; rock and roll; heavy metal
- Years active: 2012 – present
- Labels: Earache Records, Off Yer Rocka, Wreking Crew Records
- Members: Brad Marr; Ben Laguda; Andrew Greentree; Brenton Kewish
- Website: massiveoz.com

Massive is a hard rock band from Melbourne, Australia. The current line up consists of Brad Marr (vocals, guitar), Ben Laguda (lead guitar, backing vocals), Brenton Kewish (bass) and Andrew Greentree (drums).

In the edition of 20 April 2016 of Kerrang Magazine they were described as a band "more than ready to follow in Guns N Roses footsteps". They have also been featured in Rolling Stone Classic Rock Magazine and Metal Hammer The band are signed to Earache Records.

== History ==
Massive formed in 2012 when past high school friends Brad Marr and Jarrod Medwin, who were in separate bands at the time, joined up to co-write some songs. The pair spent three months in a farm house attic demoing what would become the foundations of the band's debut album Full Throttle. Later that same year the line up was completed by brothers Aaron (bass) and Ben Laguda (lead guitar).

Having all played in several local bands previously, Massive wanted to get into the studio immediately and in December 2012 they booked three weeks at Light Hill Studios in Melbourne's north west.to start work on their debut album.

In March 2013 the band announced a short Australian tour with Glenn Hughes

Having previously been a fan of the band, Aidan McGarrigle joined on bass in May 2013.

The band were signed by Earache Records in February 2014 after owner Digby Pearson fell in love with the album.

Full Throttle was featured and given away free on the May 2014 edition of Classic Rock Magazine. and also made available for free download on Google Play in the UK before its official release date.

In mid 2014 their first ever European tour was announced supporting UK rock act The Treatment and American southern rock band Blackberry Smoke as well as a festival appearance at Hard Rock Hell 8

Immediately after the tour, the band once again moved into Light Hill Studios to start work on their follow up album "Destination Somewhere" The band completed 5 songs before deciding to halt recordings so they could write some more.

Brendan Forward having moved from Newcastle, Australia to pursue his music career joined Massive on his 27th birthday in April 2015 while the band were in the middle of an Australian tour.

In late 2015 it was announced that Massive would be supporting Screaming Jets for 30 dates around Australia.

Almost a year after recording the album "Destination Somewhere" was released worldwide through Earache Records on 22 April to critical acclaim and immediately went back on the road around Australia for a second support tour with the Screaming Jets who had personally asked for the band. In August 2016 they announced their first European headline tour which they called the Aussie Wrecking Crew Tour, an all Aussie line up spanning 25 dates. They also played main stage at Hard Rock Hell 10. The Massive "Round 2" UK tour was announced immediately after for November adding another 16 shows to their lengthy European visit.

The band took a well earned break at the beginning of 2017 but in April they announced they will be supporting American Funk Rock band Living Colour on their Australian tour as well as brand new single titled "Calm Before the Storm" and a return to the UK in June, their 4th tour in as many years: This time with original lead guitarist Ben Laguda back in the band, and playing a handful of summer festivals including the first instalment of Amplified Festival, Ramblin' Man Fair, and Stone Free Festival alongside bands such as ZZ Top, Glenn Hughes, Extreme, Rainbow and Rival Sons

In late 2017, the band announced that drummer Jarrod Medwin will be leaving the band. Former Black Diamond drummer Andrew Greentree was named as Massive's new drummer in early 2018 after an exhaustive process of over 100 applicants. Later in 2018, Massive also announced a new 5 year record deal with European hard rock label Off Yer Rocka with the band's 3rd studio album to be released by the label on February 1, 2019.

The band immediately announced 52 date tour stretching across 10 countries to promote the release of the new album. On February 11, 2019, Rebuild Destroy entered the official Australian Independent charts at #1.

== Band members ==
=== Current members ===
- Brad Marr – vocals, guitar (2012–present)
- Ben Laguda – lead guitar, backing vocals (2012–2015, 2017–present)
- Andrew Greentree – drums (2018–present)
- Brenton Kewish – bass (2018–present)

=== Previous members ===
- Aaron Laguda – bass (2012–2014)
- Brendan Forward – lead guitar, vocals (2015–2017)
- Jarrod Medwin – drums, backing vocals (2012–2017)
- Aidan McGarrigle – bass, backing vocals (2013–2017)

== Discography ==
=== Studio albums ===
Title	Album Release details	Chart Peak	
Title	Album Release details	Aus (AIR Charts)	UK (Rock Charts)
Full Throttle	Released 9 February 2013; Label: Independent	–	–
Full Throttle	Re released 21 July 2014; Label: Earache	–	–
Destination Somewhere	Released 22 April 2016; Label: Earache	19	33
Rebuild Destroy	Released 1 Feb 2019; Label: Off Yer Rocka	1	-

=== Music videos ===
Year	Title	Album	Director
2012	One By One	Full Throttle	
2015	Ghost	Full Throttle	Dani Nolan
2016	One for the Road	Destination Somewhere	
2016	Blood Money Blues	Destination Somewhere	Rom Anthomis
2018	Roses	Rebuild Destroy	
2019	Long Time Coming	Rebuild Destroy	
2019	Bullet	Rebuild Destroy	Luke Bravin
