= Haggard Cat =

English band

- Also known as: Haggard Cat Bothday Present
- Origin: Nottingham, England
- Genres: Hardcore punk; heavy metal
- Years active: 2015–present
- Labels: Earache Records
- Members: Matt Reynolds; Tom Marsh
- Website: www.haggardcat.com

Haggard Cat is an English hardcore punk band formed by the Nottingham duo, Matt Reynolds and Tom Marsh (ex-Heck). Haggard Cat was originally a side project but since the split of Heck it has become Reynolds and Marsh's main project.

In 2017 the band toured with Jamie Lenman, DZ Deathrays and Weirds, as well as playing a headline slot at Camden Rocks and opening the main stage at ArcTanGent festival. The band have continued to play around the UK and Europe since the release of their debut album, Challenger. UK festival appearances have included Glastonbury Festival and 2000 Trees Festival.

Haggard Cat signed to Earache Records in 2018 and commented, "We're so proud to sign to Earache and follow in the footsteps of some of our absolute heroes; we're in some great company and we can't wait to show the world the beast that we've been working on. The future is going to be loud! Wear protection!". They then toured with Kent hardcore band Feed the Rhino early that year.

On 1 October 2019, Haggard Cat announced their new album Common Sense Holiday via social media. It was released on 13 March 2020 via Earache Records.

Haggard Cat independently released their Cheer Up EP on the 3rd of September 2021.

Their postponed 2020 tour finally kicked off in September 2021 to support the release of Cheer Up.

== Discography ==
Title	Album details	Type
Charger	Released on SoundCloud Released: 2015	EP
Challenger	Released: 20 April 2018 Label: Earache Records	LP
Common Sense Holiday	Released: 13 March 2020 Label: Earache Records	LP
Cheer Up	Released: 3 September 2021 Independent Release	EP

Charger
No.	Title	Length
1.	"Intro"	0:49
2.	"Alligator Tightrope"	2:30
3.	"$hit Dollar $huffle"	2:38
4.	"Homeless Camping"	2:59
5.	"Water Hose Rodeo"	2:04
6.	"Gumblood Shuffle"	2:56
7.	"Raccoon Piss Sloe Jam"	6:05
8.	"Beard O' Leeches"	2:41
9.	"Snake River Jump"	2:56
10.	"Bounty Hunter"	12:24

Challenger
No.	Title	Length
1.	"The Patriot"	3:05
2.	"American Graffiti"	3:01
3.	"Grave Digger"	2:09
4.	"Bad News (Travels Fast)"	2:56
5.	"Goldberg"	2:52
6.	"The Legend"	5:37
7.	"Bone Shaker"	2:59
8.	"The Felon"	3:24
9.	"Bearfoot"	3:04
10.	"High Roller"	3:51

Common Sense Holiday
No.	Title	Length
1.	"First Words"	4:26
2.	"European Hardware"	3:13
3.	"Human Animal"	2:55
4.	"Show Reel"	3:16
5.	"Rational"	4:11
6.	"Time"	3:39
7.	"Threads"	3:16
8.	"The Natives"	4:59
9.	"Cheat"	4:01
10.	"Pearl"	2:56
11.	"Ghosts Already"	6:41

Cheer Up
No.	Title	Length
1.	"Quit Your Jobs"	3:55
2.	"Amateur Dramatics"	3:52
3.	"Water Me Down"	3:24
4.	"Fucking TV"	3:08
5.	"Cow"	3:45

== Musical style ==
Sonically the band are more akin to the Jack White, Royal Blood and Death From Above 1979 world than they are Heck. It is rock, it is blues and it is heavy metal. Matt Reynolds (guitarist and frontman) uses a two amp setup to get the distinct sound. A A/B system of guitar and bass amplifiers. Coupling this with a pedalboard, Matt can create low bass effects and squealing guitar sounds. Matt relies heavily on a green Russian Big Muff to get his distinct fuzzy sound. Reynolds' tone combined with Tom Marsh' frantic drum playing, creates a unique style of music.
