= Goodbye June =

American rock band

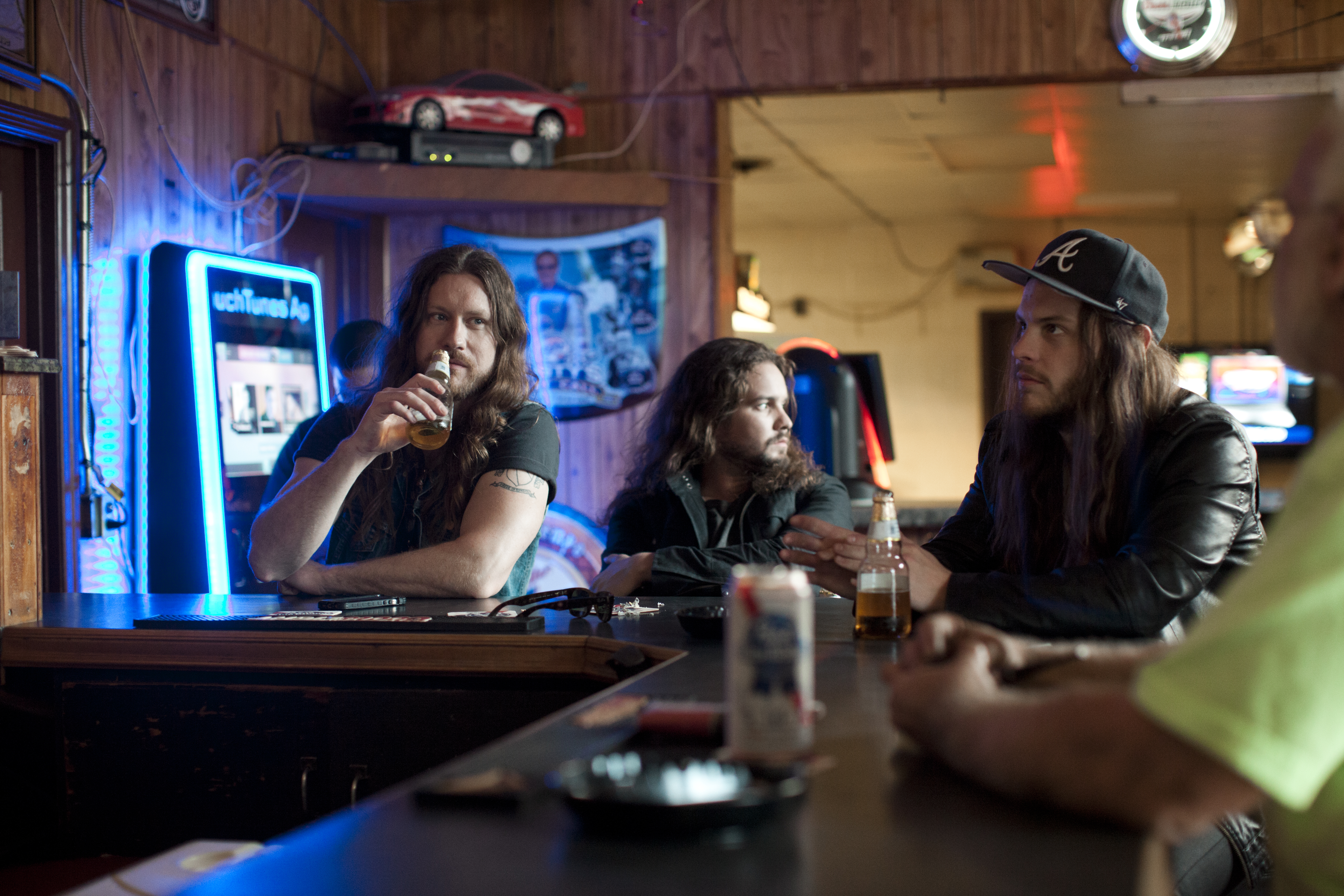
- Goodbye June in Nashville Dive Bar. From left to right; Brandon, Tyler and Landon.

Background information
- Origin: Nashville, Tennessee, United States
- Genres: Hard rock; blues rock
- Years active: 2009–present
- Labels: Cotton Valley Music; Earache; Interscope
- Members: Landon Milbourn; Tyler Baker; Brandon Qualkenbush
- Website: Goodbyejune.com

Goodbye June is a rock band from Nashville, Tennessee. The band is composed of cousins Landon Milbourn (lead vocals, tambourine), Brandon Qualkenbush (rhythm guitar, bass, drums, backing vocals), and Tyler Baker (lead guitar).

== History ==
Goodbye June was formed after the death of lead guitarist Tyler Baker's brother. Eventually named Goodbye June in memory of Baker's brother who passed in June, the band released their independent debut album Nor The Wild Music Flow on CVR in 2012, followed by Magic Valley on Cotton Valley Music / Interscope Records in May 2017, Community Inn in 2019, and See Where The Night Goes in 2022, both on Earache Records / Cotton Valley Music.

The band has toured throughout the United States as well as the UK, Germany, Sweden, Finland, The Netherlands, Norway, Sweden, Belgium, France, and Spain.

Goodbye June's music has been used in Madden 17, NFL, WWE and ESPN College Football broadcasts among others.

Goodbye June achieved a US Top 30 Mainstream Rock single with "Oh No" in 2016. In 2022, their album See Where The Night Goes achieved a #33 placement in the UK Albums Chart and a #1 position in the UK Rock Chart. They also achieved a Top 20 in the Offizielle Deutsche Charts with See Where The Night Goes, debuting at #20. On the Billboard charts they placed at #12 on the Current Hard Music chart, #18 on the Top New Artist chart and #128 on the Billboard 200 chart.

== Musical style ==
Influenced by AC/DC, Led Zeppelin, Kings of Leon, The Black Keys, Jimi Hendrix among many other rock bands, Goodbye June's music has been described as "blues-infused rock with hard-driving beats, blistering guitars, and down and dirty vocals".

== Discography ==
=== Studio albums ===
- Nor The Wild Music Flow (2012-2013 / CVR)
- Magic Valley (2017 / Cotton Valley Music / Interscope Records)
- Community Inn (2019 / Earache Records / Cotton Valley Music)
- See Where The Night Goes (2022 / Earache Records / Cotton Valley Music)
- Deep In the Trouble (2024)

=== Extended plays ===
- Danger In The Morning (2016 / Interscope Records)
- Secrets In The Sunset (2018 / Suretone / Cotton Valley Music)

=== Singles ===
List of single plays, with selected chart positions, showing year released and album name
Title	Year	Peak chart positions	Album
Title	Year	US Main. Rock	Album
"Oh No"	2016	30	Magic Valley (+1)
"Danger In The Morning"	2017	—	(1) Danger In The Morning (EP)
"Man Of The Moment"	2017	—	(1) Danger In The Morning (EP)
"Daisy"	2017	—	Magic Valley
"Good Side"	2017	—	Magic Valley
"Bamboozler"	2018	—	Magic Valley
"Blindly Follow Blindly"	2018	—	Secrets In The Sunset (EP)
"Get Happy"	2018	—	Secrets In The Sunset (EP)
"Secrets In The Sunset"	2019	—	Community Inn
"Anywhere The Wind Blows"	2019	—	Community Inn
"Universal Mega Love"	2020	—	Community Inn
"Lonely Beautiful People"	2020	—	Community Inn
"Step Aside"	2021	—	See Where The Night Goes
"Three Chords"	2021	38	See Where The Night Goes
"See Where The Night Goes"	2021	—	See Where The Night Goes
"Stand And Deliver"	2022	—	See Where The Night Goes
"What I Need"	2022	—	See Where The Night Goes
"The Hard Way"	2024	—	Deep In the Trouble
"Riding Through"	2024	—	Deep In the Trouble
"Pile of Bones"	2024	—	Deep In the Trouble

== Videos ==
List of music videos, showing year released and directors
Title	Year	Director(s)
"Oh No"	2016	Tyler Dunning Evans
"Darlin'"	2016	Tyler Dunning Evans
"Danger In The Morning"	2016	Tyler Dunning Evans
"Man Of The Moment"	2016	Tyler Dunning Evans
"Daisy"	2017	Josh Forbes
"Good Side"	2017	Tyler Dunning Evans
"Anywhere The Wind Blows"	2019	Unknown
"Step Aside"	2021	Tyler Dunning Evans
"See Where The Night Goes"	2021	Brandon Qualkenbush
"Three Chords"	2022	Unknown
"The Hard Way"	2024	Jordan Wolfbauer
"Riding Through"	2024	Jordan Wolfbauer
"Pile of Bones"	2024	Unknown
"Heart Still In It?"	2024	Unknown

== Members ==
Current

- Landon Milbourn: Lead Vocals, Acoustic Guitar
- Tyler Baker: Lead Guitar, Vocals
- Brandon Qualkenbush: Guitars (Rhythm/Bass), Vocals

== See also ==
- List of alternative rock artists
