= Ultraviolence (band) =

- Origin: London
- Genres: Industrial, hardcore, electronica, techno
- Years active: 1991–2004, 2010–present
- Labels: Earache Records, Food Records, White Label Music, Safe
- Members: Johnny Violent, Mel Allezbleu

Ultraviolence is a British industrial/techno band, formed in London in 1991 and headed by 'the Quentin Tarantino of techno' Johnny Violent (b. Jonathan Casey). To date, they have released five studio albums, including a ten-year retrospective, and six EPs/singles. The group have produced a number of club classics which include the tracks "Hardcore Motherfucker" and "Psycho Drama" and have been recognised as being at the 'forefront of the UK Industrial-Cyber scene'. The Ultraviolence sound incorporates elements from various styles including hardcore techno/gabber, breakbeat hardcore, industrial techno, power noise, metal and rap.

A substantial body of the Ultraviolence releases received positive critical reception since the first album Life of Destructor gaining '5Ks' from Kerrang! magazine. In 2004 Ultraviolence released a retrospective two CD album titled Blown Away 1994-2004.

Violent has worked with several female vocal artists on different releases, but as of 2005, singer and angle grinding stage performer Mel Allezbleu has become a permanent member of the band.

== History ==
Casey first experimented in making electronic music in his teens. After attending Goldsmiths College in London for a diploma in sound engineering and working in a record shop, he tried his hand at gigging locally with a college friend.

He got into production in a serious way in late 1990 and adopted the name Johnny Violent (aka Ultraviolence) in reference to the film A Clockwork Orange. He saved up money for some studio time and recorded and handful of tracks including "You'll Never Sleep Tonight" which was played by John Peel on BBC Radio 1 and gained the attention of London label Food Records, who signed Violent in 1992.

The relationship between Ultraviolence and the trendy, indie-orientated Food Records was never likely to be a happy one and soon dissolved. It was 1994 before the debut album Life of Destructor was released on Nottingham's Earache Records label. Earache had been previously known for releasing extreme heavy metal acts such as Carcass and Napalm Death. Nevertheless, the relationship between Violent and Earache's label owner Digby Pearson proved a fruitful and durable one over the next decade.

It was the second album, Psycho Drama (1996), that made critics start to believe there was more to the act than pure noise terror. Highly ambitious in concept and execution, Psycho Drama was a full-length gabber "opera", telling the tortured love story of the "Hitman" and "Jessica" characters.

In 1995, Ultraviolence toured the US with fellow UK industrialists Cubanate. However, the limitations of Violent's one-man stage shows were becoming apparent and American audiences never quite took to Ultraviolence like Techno-aware European crowds. From this point on, Violent usually appeared on-stage backed by various singers, dancers and showers of sparks from male or female angle-grinders.

The third album, 1998's Killing God marked a new transition to a new, more commercial Ultraviolence sound, dubbed "happy hardcore" by some, although the lyrical themes remained as bleak as ever. The album contained a cover of the Black Sabbath classic song "Paranoid".

In 2001, the fourth Ultraviolence album, Superpower was released, again groping for a wider market.

In 2014, Jonathan Casey won the Gardens Category of the Royal Horticultural Society Photographic Competition 2013 for his photograph of Kentwell Hall Moat

== Discography ==
- Life of Destructor (1994)
- Psycho Drama (1996)
- Killing God (1998)
- Superpower (2001)
- Blown Away 1994-2004 (2004)
