= Scarlet Rebels =

Welsh melodic rock band

Scarlet Rebels are a four-piece Welsh melodic rock band residing in Llanelli, South Wales. On 4 February 2022, they achieved their first Official UK Top 40 Album with their album See Through Blue, released on Earache Records, debuting at No. 7. This made them the first band from Llanelli to ever achieve a UK Top 40 Album. Scarlet Rebels followed this up with 'Where The Colours Meet' in 2024 which debuted at No. 15 in the Official UK Top 40 Album chart and also landed the band their first No. 1 Rock and Metal Chart entry.

Scarlet Rebels are also known for their efforts to raise money and collect donations for local food banks and charities such as The Trussell Trust in response to the key social and political issues of the time.

== History ==
The band are currently signed to Earache Records and were formed in 2018. The band consist of Wayne Doyle (vocals/guitar), Chris Jones (lead guitar), Josh Townshend (guitar – and son of The Who's guitarist Simon Townshend and nephew of The Who's guitarist Pete Townshend), Wayne 'Pricey' Esmonde (bass) and Gary Doyle (drums).

Scarlet Rebels released their debut album Show Your Colours on 8 August 2019, with Rock of Angels Records, which was produced and engineered by Tim Hamill (known for his work with Lemmy, Girlschool and George Michael) and recorded at Sonic One Studios in Llanelli, South Wales. The album artwork was designed by guitarist Josh Townshend (who also played keyboard and piano on the album).

During the COVID-19 pandemic's restrictions on touring, the band recorded LIVE: Made in Sonic One, a live EP also recorded at Sonic One Studios. Show Your Colours and LIVE: Made In Sonic One were both hailed as Album Of The Month by Great Music Stories.

Their second studio album See Through Blue was written and recorded in 2020 (and once again was recorded with Tim Hamill). Throughout the album campaign, they saw airplay on Planet Rock (radio station)'s playlist and BBC Radio 2, and their track “Take You Home” was voted Classic Rock (magazine)'s Track of the Week.

The third studio album 'Where The Colours Meet' was written and recorded in 2023 at Andy Sneap's studio in Belper. It was produced by Chris Clancy and Colin Richardson and became the bands second top 20 Official UK Chart entry. Again, the campaign saw airplay on Planet Rock, BBC Radio 2, BBC Wales and having tracks 'Secret Drug' and 'Let Me In' voted as Classic Rock Magazine track of the week.

Scarlet Rebels are considered a part of the New Wave Of Classic Rock scene (they appeared on The Official New Wave Of Classic Rock – Volume 1 compilation, which aimed to capture the most prominent bands in the fast-growing music scene). They have featured on the bill of live festivals such as Steelhouse Festival, Planet Rockstock, Planet Rock's Winter's End, Hard Rock Hell, WDR Fernsehen's Rockpalast Crossroads Festival, Loverocks and radio festival Spirit Of Wildfire.

Scarlet Rebels were awarded Band Of The Year by Meridian FM's Great Music Stories in 2019 (having been awarded several Band of the Month and Album of the Month accolades already) and were also a runner up to this title in 2020. Their track “These Days” was awarded Great Music Stories' Single of the Year in 2021. Their 2020 UK tour in support of their debut album Show Your Colours, The Rising Tour, was sponsored by Planet Rock Radio.

== Food Bank Initiative ==
From 2021, Scarlet Rebels began using their live shows for positive change, pledging to collect food donations at all headline shows going forward (via attendees or via delivery apps such as Deliveroo). They also participated in a sponsored cycle, raising over £2,000 for The Trussell Trust. An album launch event on the Thames that aimed to collect food donations for local food banks was cancelled due to the band's political album cover for See Through Blue, which featured an effigy of Prime Minister Boris Johnson as a demon.

== Band members ==
=== Current members ===
- Wayne Doyle – vocals, rhythm guitar (2018–present)
- Chris "CJ" Jones – lead guitar (2018–present)
- Gary Doyle – drums (2018–present)
- Carl Oag – bass guitar (2024–present)

=== Former members ===
- Wayne "Pricey" Esmonde – bass guitar (2018–2024)

== Discography ==
=== Studio albums ===
- Show Your Colours (2019)
- See Through Blue (2022)
- Where the Colours Meet (2024)
- Flawed by Design (13 November 2026)

=== Live albums ===
- Live: Made in Sonic One (2020)
