= House Upon the Hill =

EP by RJ Thompson
- Released: 24 November 2014
- Recorded: 2014
- Length: 19:26
- Label: Chicken Wire
- Producer: Adam Sinclair

RJ Thompson chronology
The Cognitive Rules (2011)	House Upon the Hill (2014)	Live (2016)

Singles from House Upon the Hill
- 1. "The Numbers" Released: 1 June 2014

House Upon the Hill is a 2014 EP by British singer-songwriter RJ Thompson. It was released on 24 November 2014 and serves as the follow-up to his 2011 EP The Cognitive Rules. The EP was recorded at Blast Recording and Loft Music Studios in Newcastle upon Tyne, and mastered by Christian Wright at Abbey Road Studios.

== Tours ==
To promote the EP, Thompson went on tour as the support act to Jools Holland. The tour consisted of five dates including the Royal Albert Hall, London, Symphony Hall, Birmingham, O2 Apollo, Manchester, and Motorpoint Arena Cardiff.

== Singles ==
"The Numbers" was released as a single on 1 June 2014, later appearing on the House Upon the Hill EP when it was released on 24 November 2014.

== Reception ==
The title track from the EP received airplay on dozens of UK radio stations, and was playlisted on The Breeze network of stations (covering 15 different regions of the UK).

"No Man's Land", one of the songs on the EP, was featured on the cover CD for UK music magazine Acoustic Magazine in January 2015.

== Track listing ==
No.	Title	Writer(s)	Producer(s)	Length
1.	"No Man's Land"	RJ Thompson	Adam Sinclair	3:53
2.	"House Upon the Hill"	RJ Thompson and Adam Sinclair	Adam Sinclair	3:20
3.	"Born Alone"	RJ Thompson	Adam Sinclair	4:15
4.	"The Numbers"	RJ Thompson	Adam Sinclair	3:11
5.	"Cannery Row"	RJ Thompson	Adam Sinclair	4:47
