= Live (RJ Thompson album) =

Live album by RJ Thompson
- Released: 4 July 2016
- Genre: Singer-songwriter, pop
- Label: Chicken Wire Records

RJ Thompson chronology
| House Upon The Hill (2014) | Live (2016) | Echo Chamber (2017) |

Live is the 2016 live album by British singer-songwriter RJ Thompson. It was released on 4 July 2016 and serves as the follow-up to his 2014 EP House Upon The Hill. Part of the live album was recorded during RJ's tour with Jools Holland, and other tracks were recorded at his concert at the Sage, Gateshead in 2015. The album was mastered by Geoff Pesche at Abbey Road Studios.

== Tours ==
RJ toured as the support act to Jools Holland throughout 2014 and 2015, during which 5 of the tracks on this album were recorded. The tour consisted of 14 dates including the Royal Albert Hall, London, Symphony Hall, Birmingham, O2 Apollo, Manchester, and Motorpoint Arena Cardiff.

== Reception ==
The album has received widespread critical acclaim to date, with the July 2016 printed edition of Acoustic Magazine proclaiming it "an album that holds attention from start to finish; and that's no mean feat".

The Crack Magazine said it "really is quite beautiful stuff, pop songs with real heart, and his voice is right on the money throughout".

Narc Magazine said "the album makes for a phenomenal document of Thompson's live sound".

== Track listing ==
| No. | Title | Writer(s) | Length |
|---|---|---|---|
| 1. | "House Upon The Hill (Live)" | RJ Thompson & Adam Sinclair | 3:57 |
| 2. | "Born Alone (Live)" | RJ Thompson | 4:47 |
| 3. | "Walkin' After Midnight (Live)" | Alan Block and Donn Hecht | 3:00 |
| 4. | "Cannery Row (Live)" | RJ Thompson | 4:40 |
| 5. | "No Man's Land (Live)" | RJ Thompson | 4:21 |
| 6. | "Sirens in the Street (Live)" | RJ Thompson | 3:59 |
| 7. | "You Are The Best Thing (Live)" | Ray LaMontagne | 4:04 |
| 8. | "Vendetta (Live)" | RJ Thompson | 5:02 |
| 9. | "A Better Life (Live)" | RJ Thompson | 4:59 |
| 10. | "The Numbers (Live)" | RJ Thompson | 4:56 |
