= The Cognitive Rules =

EP by RJ Thompson
- Released: 4 December 2011
- Recorded: 2011
- Length: 28:13
- Label: Chicken Wire
- Producer: Fred Purser

RJ Thompson chronology
The Cognitive Rules (2011)	House Upon the Hill (2014)

Singles from The Cognitive Rules
- 1. "A Better Life" Released: 27 February 2011; 2. "When I Get Old" Released: 17 July 2011

The Cognitive Rules is the 2011 EP by British singer-songwriter RJ Thompson. It was released on 4 December 2011 and serves as the follow-up to his 2007 EP, Acoustic Sessions. The EP was recorded at Trinity Heights in Newcastle upon Tyne and mastered by Geoff Pesche at Abbey Road Studios.

== Singles ==
RJ released two singles in the year, 2011 (A Better Life and When I Get Old), and both tracks were released on the EP The Cognitive Rules later that same year. The single A Better Life received airplay on BBC Radio 2, while opening track Fables was featured on BBC Radio 6 Music

== Track listing ==
No.	Title	Writer(s)	Producer(s)	Length
1.	"Fables"	RJ Thompson	Fred Purser	4:38
2.	"A Better Life"	RJ Thompson	Fred Purser	4:04
3.	"When I Get Old"	RJ Thompson	Fred Purser	4:26
4.	"Vendetta"	RJ Thompson	Fred Purser	4:58
5.	"The Day I Win"	RJ Thompson	Fred Purser	4:45
6.	"Risk"	RJ Thompson	Fred Purser	5:22
