= Massive Wagons =

British rock band

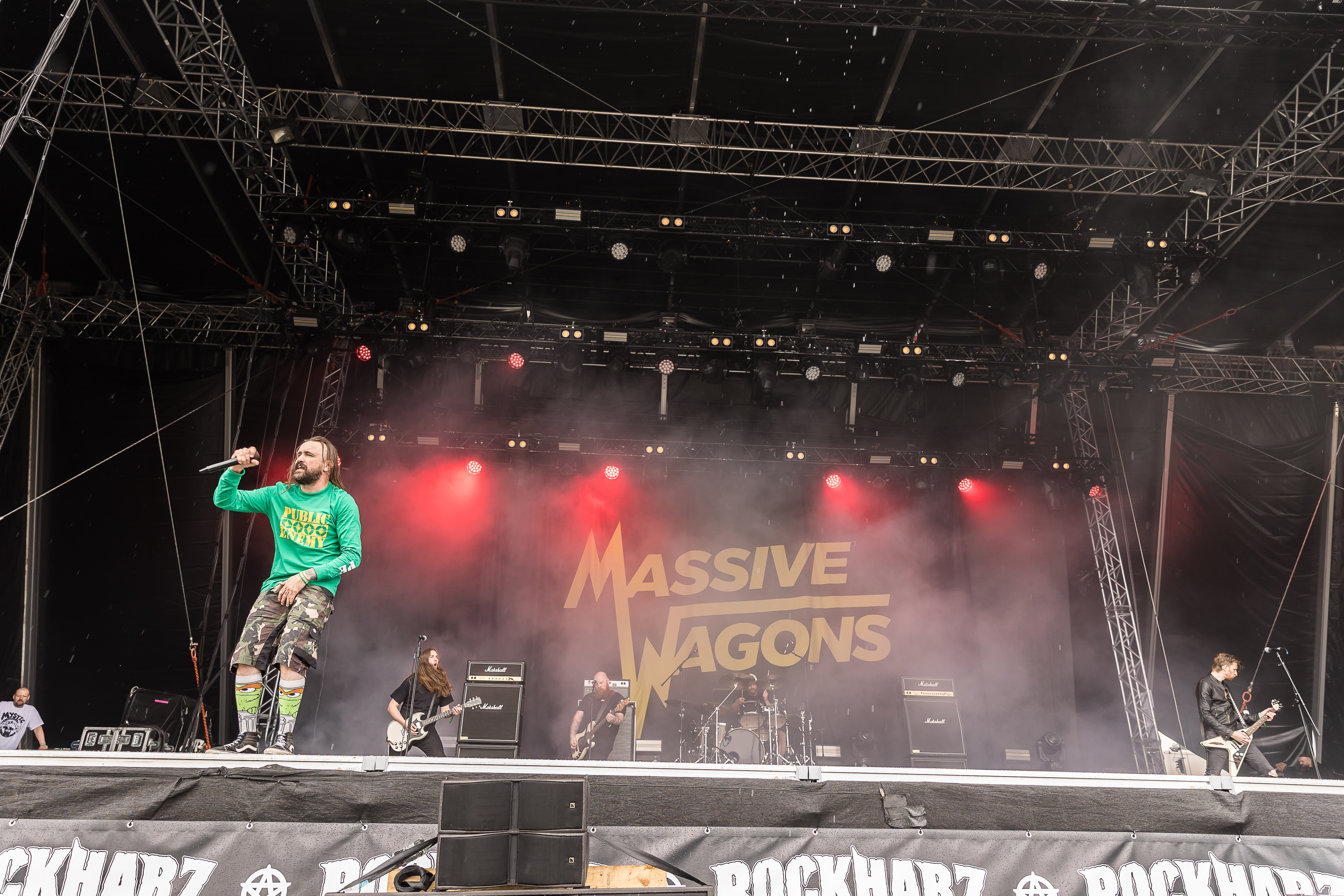
- Massive Wagons at Rockharz 2024

Background information
- Origin: Lancaster, England
- Genres: Rock; punk rock; hard rock; pop punk; alternative rock
- Years active: 2009–present
- Labels: Casket; Off Yer Rocka; Earache
- Members: Barry Mills; Adam Thistlethwaite; Alex Thistlethwaite; Stevie Holl; Adam 'Bowz' Bouskill
- Website: www.massivewagons.com

Massive Wagons are an English rock band. They were formed in the north Lancashire city of Lancaster in 2009.

== History ==
After witnessing a gig by the Australian rock band Airbourne in Manchester, guitarist Adam Thistlethwaite and vocalist Barry Mills broke away from their popular indie cover band Ace Face to write original hard rock music in 2009. Following a short period with another drummer and bass guitarist, the eventual line up was secured by recruiting Alex Thistlethwaite (brother of Adam) on drums and friends Carl Cochrane and Adam Bouskill on second guitar and bass respectively. In 2017, Carl Cochrane departed and Stephen Holl joined the band as second guitarist, this remains the only line-up change to date.

=== 2009–2016 ===
In the early years Massive Wagons gained a steady but fiercely loyal following by playing many independently promoted gigs and tours through the UK. Though commercial success was yet to be had, a solid musical output through albums Fire It Up (2012), Fight the System (2014), Welcome to the World (2016) ensured the band quickly converted new-comers to long-term fans on the road. In April 2016 Massive Wagons played multiple sold-out club tours in support of the Welcome to the World album. That summer, the band were invited to support Ginger Wildheart on his solo tour.

=== 2017–2019 ===
In early 2017 Massive Wagons released a 7" vinyl-only single Back to the Stack in support of The Shona Smile Foundation. The single gained mainstream radio play and attracted the attention of independent record label Earache to whom the band were promptly signed. The bands first album with Earache Full Nelson was released in August 2018, entering the Official UK Album Charts at no.16. Several UK tours followed and the band toured Europe for the first time. The band toured with The Dead Daisies, The Wildhearts and long time influences Thunder in early 2019. In response to their growing popularity Massive Wagons were invited to support Lynyrd Skynyrd on their UK arena tour in the summer of 2019, along with Status Quo with whom they played numerous other shows that year. Another headline tour took place before the band retreated to Backstage Studio, owned by Andy Sneap to work with record producers Colin Richardson and Chris Clancy on the following album.

=== 2020–present ===
Recording sessions for the band's fifth studio album House of Noise finished in February 2020, however due to the COVID-19 pandemic all planned touring and promotional activity was cancelled. Despite the complete lack of touring promotion, the band released House of Noise in July 2020 where it earned the band their first top-10 position on the UK Albums Chart at no.9. The following year saw the band establish their patreon page and perform as part of the Download Festival Pilot event in June 2021. When enabled to tour without restriction in September 2021, the follow-up material was already written despite this the band treated the tour as the official House of Noise promotional tour, despite the album having been released a year previous. Massive Wagons supported The Darkness on their lengthy Motorheart UK tour in late 2021 before reuniting with Colin Richardson and Chris Clancy at Backstage Studio to record their sixth studio album.

Triggered! was completed in March 2022 and released in October the same year, entering the Official UK Album Charts at no. 6. Critically acclaimed, Triggered! indulged in the bands punk influences and continued to prove the band were not content to rest on their laurels.

Barry Mills said this of the release: "I think this album is a lot more British sounding. I think we've managed to bring our sound more up-to-date, it sounds fresh and exciting. It has much more of a punk vibe about it, but, that being said, it's still full of everything we love about guitar music."

After a summer of European festivals, including another Download Festival Massive Wagons performed a headline UK tour in November 2022 with Ugly Kid Joe which saw the band step up in venue capacity, notably playing London's Shepherds Bush Empire for the first time. Another UK Tour followed in April 2023 which showcased the band's evolving live production.

November 2024 saw the release of their seventh studio album Earth to Grace, followed by a host of in-store acoustic performances, and a full UK tour. Playing their largest to date UK headline venues and selling out several. This will be followed with a short UK tour in May and a return to Europe.

== Discography ==
=== Studio albums ===
Chart performance of Massive Wagons' studio albums
Title	Year	UK Albums	UK Rock & Metal Albums
Fire It Up	2012	—	—
Fight the System	2014	—	—
Welcome to the World	2016	—	—
Full Nelson	2018	16	1
House of Noise	2020	9	1
Triggered!	2022	6	1
Earth to Grace	2024	4	1

=== Live/rarities albums ===
- The Good the Bad and the Ugly (Off Yer Rocka, 2015)
- New Favourites & Hidden Gems (Earache, 2024)
