= Yearbook (album) =

2022 studio album by RJ Thompson

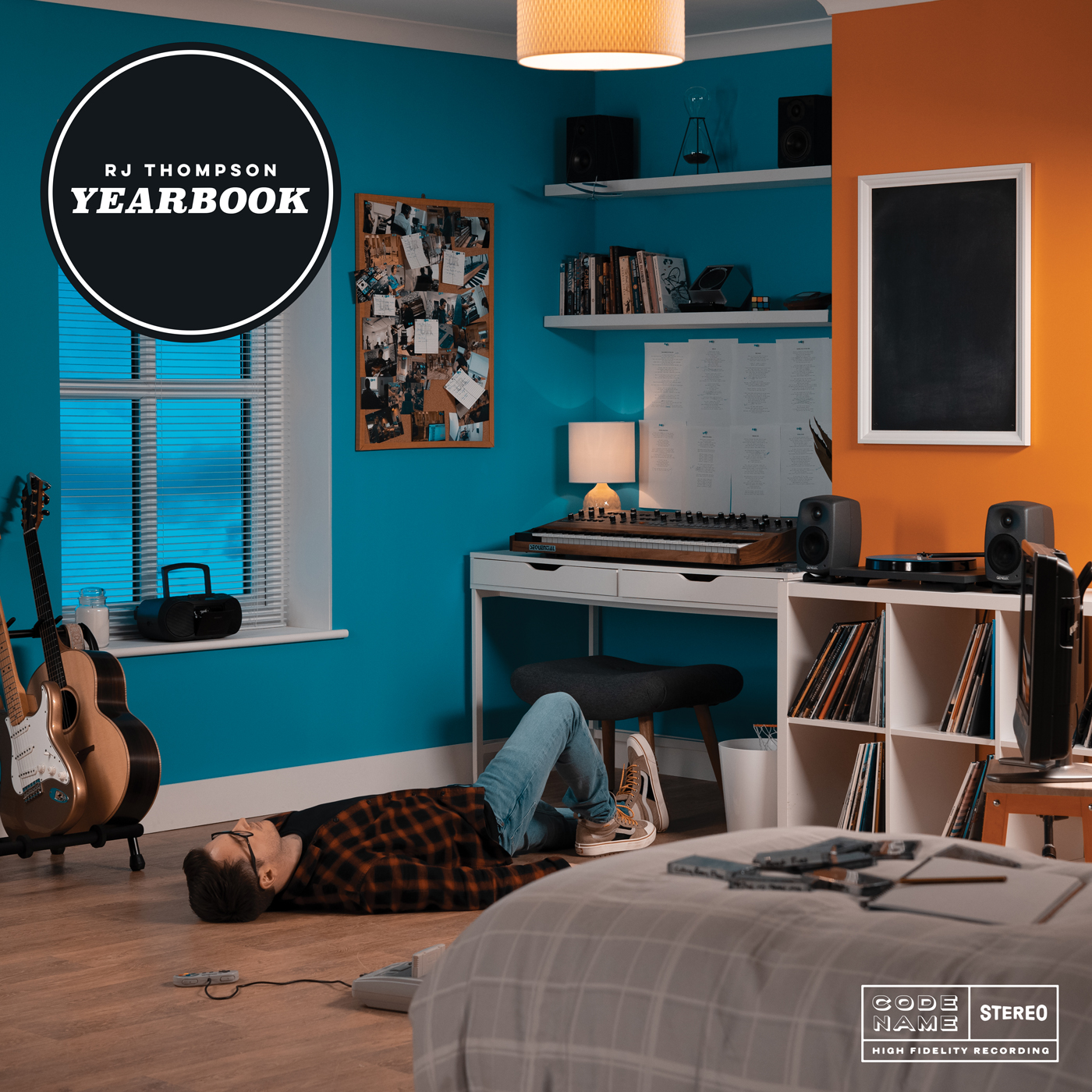

Studio album by RJ Thompson
- Released: 07 October 2022
- Recorded: 2021
- Genre: Pop, Indie-Pop, Alt-Pop
- Label: Codename Music
- Producer: RJ Thompson, Adam Sinclair

Singles from Yearbook
- 1. "Your Money Or Your Life" Released: 11 May 2022; 2. "Super 8" Released: 24 June 2022; 3. "Feel Alive" Released: 13 July 2022; 4. "Rescue You" Released: 24 August 2022; 5. "Forest Fires" Released: 23 September 2022

Yearbook is a 2022 studio album by British singer-songwriter RJ Thompson. It was released on 7 October 2022.

== Singles ==
The album featured the singles Your Money or Your Life, Super 8, Feel Alive, Rescue You and Forest Fires.

== Reception ==
In an interview with The Official Charts Company in October 2022, speaking of how hard it would be to replicate the success of previous album Lifeline, RJ said "I know it's hard to do again...you've just got to be grateful that it happened and keep making music..

Favourable press coverage came from the likes of Record Of The Day, who described the single Feel Alive as "irresistibly optimistic", and Clash Magazine, who described Your Money Or Your Life as "ultra-catchy"

The album went on to land at number forty on the UK Albums Chart and number one on the UK Album Downloads Chart, dated 20th October 2022.

== Track listing ==
No.	Title	Producer(s)	Length
1.	"Tape Deck"	RJ Thompson, Adam Sinclair	0:45
2.	"Your Money Or Your Life"	RJ Thompson, Adam Sinclair	3:23
3.	"Super 8"	RJ Thompson, Adam Sinclair	3:42
4.	"Feel Alive"	RJ Thompson, Adam Sinclair	4:07
5.	"Longest Day Of The Year"	RJ Thompson, Adam Sinclair	3:42
6.	"Yearbook"	RJ Thompson, Adam Sinclair	4:20
7.	"Cutting Room Floor"	RJ Thompson, Adam Sinclair	3:42
8.	"Shadow Of A Doubt"	RJ Thompson, Adam Sinclair	3:35
9.	"Rescue You"	RJ Thompson, Adam Sinclair	3:12
10.	"Forest Fires"	RJ Thompson, Adam Sinclair	3:43
11.	"Embers"	RJ Thompson, Adam Sinclair	1:05
12.	"Skywriter"	RJ Thompson, Adam Sinclair	4:39
