= Those Damn Crows =

Welsh rock band

- Also known as: None
- Origin: Bridgend, Wales
- Genres: Alternative rock Alternative metal Hard rock Post-grunge; Pop-punk; Nu metal Arena rock Glam metal
- Works: Those Damn Crows discography
- Years active: 2014-now
- Label: Earache Records
- Publishers: Themselves and the labels
- Awards: The band of the year of 2017 by Great Music Stories; Helpfulness by Bridgend mayor's office The ones to watch by Planet Rock; The new band of the week by Metal Hammer
- Members: Shane Greenhall; Ian "Shiner" Thomas; David Winchurch; Lloyd Wood; Ronnie Huxford
- Past members: None
- Website: www.thosedamncrows.com

Those Damn Crows are a rock and metal musical group that formed in 2014 in Bridgend, Wales. It's made up of vocalist Shane Greenhall, guitarist Ian "Shiner" Thomas, bassist Lloyd Wood and percussionist Ronnie Huxford, with the second guitarist David Winchurch joining the band shortly after. The band's name came from Ronnie Huxford's father who was feeding the birds in his garden, one day, he shouted "Those damn crows!" He quickly applied it to being as the official name of the band.

The band was declared as "The ones to watch" by England's radio station Planet Rock in November of 2017 and "The new band of the week" in the Metal Hammer magazine in 2018. The band signed a worldwide, multiple album deal with Nottingham-based record label Earache Records on 14th of May, 2018 and released their debut album Murder and the Motive on 5th of October, 2018. The album landed at # 5 position on the UK Rock & Metal Singles and Albums Charts and # 5 position on the Official Independent Album Breakers Chart. They subsequently released Point of No Return in 2020, which entered the UK Albums Chart at # 14 position that same year, and then God Shaped Hole, which charted at # 4 position. The latter was the first one to be at the top of the charts for Earache Records.

== Personnel ==
Current members:

- Shane Greenhall: vocalist (2014-now)
- Ian "Shiner" Thomas: guitarist (2014-now)
- David Winchurch: guitarist (2014-now)
- Lloyd Wood: bassist (2014-now)
- Ronnie Huxford: percussionist (2014-now)

Former members:

- None

Tour members:

- None

Symbols:

- -: The member is dead.
- ~: The member is or was in the band as a tour member.

== Discography ==
Albums:

- Murder and the Motive (2018)
- Point of No Return (2020) # 14 UK
- Inhale, Exhale (2023)
- God Shaped Hole (2025)

Symbols:

- -: The album was cancelled.
- ~: The album was postponed.

Singles:

- Blink of an Eye (2018)
- Wake Up (Sleepwalker) (2022)
- Man on Fire (2022)
- This Time, I'm Ready (2022)
- See You Again (2023)
- Takedown (2023)
- Let's Go Psycho! (2024)
- Glass Heart (2024)
- Still (2024)
- No Surrender (2025)
- Dreaming (2025)

== Tours ==
=== Headlining ===
- Point of No Return tour (2020-2021)
- Inhale, Exhale tour (2023)
- God Shaped Hole tour (2025)

=== Co-headlining and support ===
- United Kingdom of Great Britain tour (supported The Dead Daisies) (2021)
- Europe & United Kingdom of Great Britain tour (supported Hollywood Vampires and Goo Goo Dolls) (2023)
- Dance, kid, Dance act II tour (supported Shinedown, Coheed and Cambria and Mammoth WVH) (2026)

== Other subjects ==
- Welsh pop and rock music
