= RJ Thompson =

British singer-songwriter (born 1985)

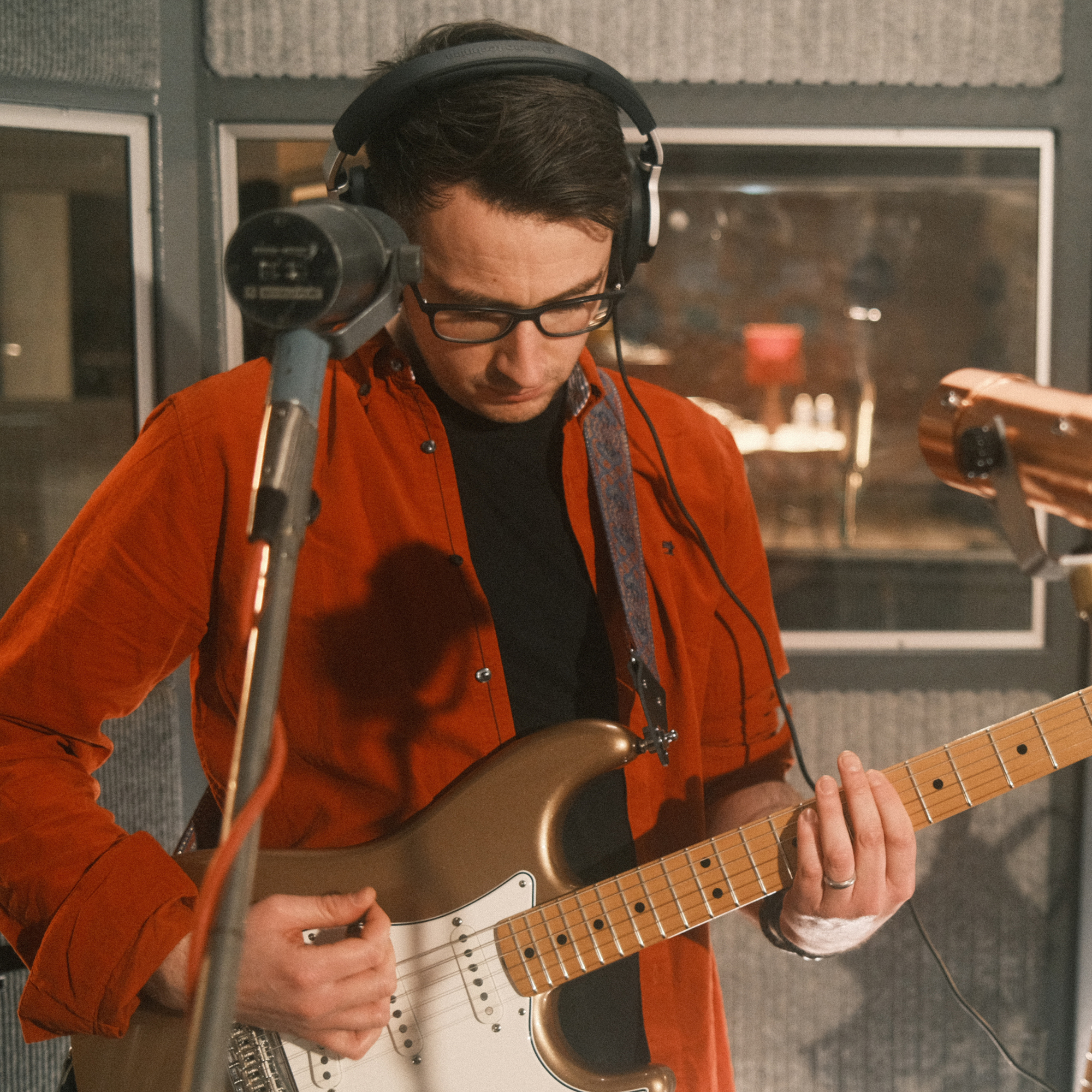
- RJ Thompson, performing live at Abbey Road Studios.

Background information
- Born: 25 June 1985 (age 41)
- Origin: Bishop Auckland, England
- Genres: Singer-songwriter, Indie pop, Pop rock
- Occupations: Singer-songwriter, guitarist, producer, filmmaker
- Instruments: Vocals, guitar, piano, drums
- Years active: 2003–present
- Website: rjthompson.com

RJ Thompson (born 25 June 1985) is a British singer-songwriter. Thompson came to prominence in 2014 after touring as support act for UK pianist Jools Holland, performing at venues including the Royal Albert Hall.

== Biography ==
=== Early life and career beginnings (1985–2010) ===
RJ Thompson grew up in the North East of England.

He wrote his first song after witnessing a U2 concert at the MEN Arena in Manchester. Following an open mic night at The Studio in Hartlepool in 2004, he was asked to open the show the following night for Live Aid organiser Midge Ure. During this time period Thompson was working on an album entitled Illogical Life, which was released to the public in 2006. Whilst released via an indie label, Thompson considers the album to be more like a "collection of demos" rather than his first studio record, as explained in a radio interview with Radio Teesdale. In the same interview, Thompson also explained that the collection of songs was originally released under his full name, but he shortened his artist name to RJ for a time to avoid confusion with the Fairport Convention singer Richard Thompson.

Following the release of Illogical Life and the subsequent Acoustic Sessions EP, Thompson spent the following three years touring Germany with Midge Ure and the UK with The Proclaimers, Sandi Thom and Gabriella Cilmi among others.

=== "A Better Life", "When I Get Old", and The Cognitive Rules EP (2011) ===
Thompson released two singles in 2011 ("A Better Life" and "When I Get Old"), and both tracks were released on the EP The Cognitive Rules released later that same year. The single "A Better Life" received airplay on BBC Radio 2, while opening track "Fables" was featured on BBC Radio 6 Music.

The EP was something of a comeback for RJ, having spent the previous four years touring and not releasing music.

=== "The Numbers" and House Upon the Hill (2014) ===
Thompson returned in June 2014 with the single "The Numbers". The song had long been performed at RJ's live shows (evidence suggests that its first performance was mid 2012), but it was officially recorded and released as a single in 2014. The song received substantial airplay on BBC Radio 2.

Later in 2014, Thompson revealed on social media that he would release the EP House Upon the Hill in November. The title track from the EP received favourable reviews in Acoustic Magazine, Narc Magazine and The Crack magazine. The EP was mastered by Christian Wright at Abbey Road Studios.

The title track from the EP House Upon the Hill received airplay on dozens of UK radio stations, and was playlisted on the Breeze network of stations (covering 15 different regions of the UK). The track also received some favourable reviews.

"No Man's Land", one of the songs on the EP, was featured on the cover CD for UK music magazine Acoustic Magazine in January 2015.

=== Live album release and "The Times They Are A-Changin'" (2016–2017) ===
Thompson announced in June 2016 that his live album, simply titled Live, would be released on 4 July 2016. The album consists of 10 live tracks.

Thompson released a cover version of the Bob Dylan song "The Times They Are a-Changin'" on 3 February 2017.

=== Echo Chamber (2017–2018) ===
Thompson announced that his first studio album, Echo Chamber, would be released on 17 November 2017. The album, and singles from the album, received positive coverage on music websites such as Wonderland, Clash, Subba Cultcha, and CelebMix. A deluxe edition of the album was released in 2018 featuring bonus and live tracks.

=== Kids, short film and Lifeline (2020–2021) ===
In January 2020, Thompson announced that his single Kids would be released on 5 February 2020.

Thompson, who has conceptualised and directed many of his music videos, announced on social media in early 2020 that he would soon begin production on his debut short film, which was expected to be released in late 2020. The film was later postponed due to the COVID-19 pandemic.

On 30 October 2020, Thompson released his second studio album Lifeline. During its initial release, the album was given a positive review by Wonderland magazine.

In March 2021, the album received a physical release, after which the album placed at number five on the UK Albums Chart and number one on the UK Album Downloads Chart, dated 19 March 2021.

=== Yearbook (2022) ===
On 11th May 2022, Thompson announced his third studio album, titled Yearbook was due for release in October 2022. The album was preceded by singles Your Money Or Your Life, Super 8, Feel Alive, Rescue You and Forest Fires.

In an interview with The Official Charts Company in October 2022, speaking of how hard it would be to replicate the success of Lifeline, RJ said "I know it's hard to do again...you've just got to be grateful that it happened and keep making music.

The album went on to land at number forty on the UK Albums Chart and number one on the UK Album Downloads Chart, dated 20th October 2022.

=== Live at Abbey Road and upcoming album (2023-present) ===
After teasing some live performances videos during the Yearbook campaign, RJ announced that a full live album, recorded and filmed in Studio Two at Abbey Road Studios, would be released in June 2023.

The album, titled Live at Abbey Road, was released on 30th June 2023 and landed at number sixteen on the UK Album Downloads Chart, dated 13th July 2023.

After a short hiatus, during which RJ worked on a screenwriting project with his collaborator Ian West, RJ announced in a series of social media posts that a new album was being written and produced throughout 2025.

== Tours ==
In 2014, Thompson announced his biggest shows to date, touring as the support act to UK pianist Jools Holland throughout the year. Concerts would take place at Perth Concert Hall (Scotland), Middlesbrough Town Hall, the Royal Albert Hall, London, Symphony Hall, Birmingham, O2 Apollo Manchester, and Motorpoint Arena Cardiff.

2015 saw Thompson tour extensively, again with Jools Holland, and also throughout Europe with Joan Armatrading. Thompson also toured with Holland again in 2017 and 2018.

A UK tour to support the release of 2022 album Yearbook was planned, but much of it was cancelled due to the COVID-19 pandemic and death of Queen Elizabeth II.

== Discography ==
- Echo Chamber (2017)
- Lifeline (2020)
- Yearbook (2022)
- Live at Abbey Road (2023)
