= Kris Barras Band =

British rock band

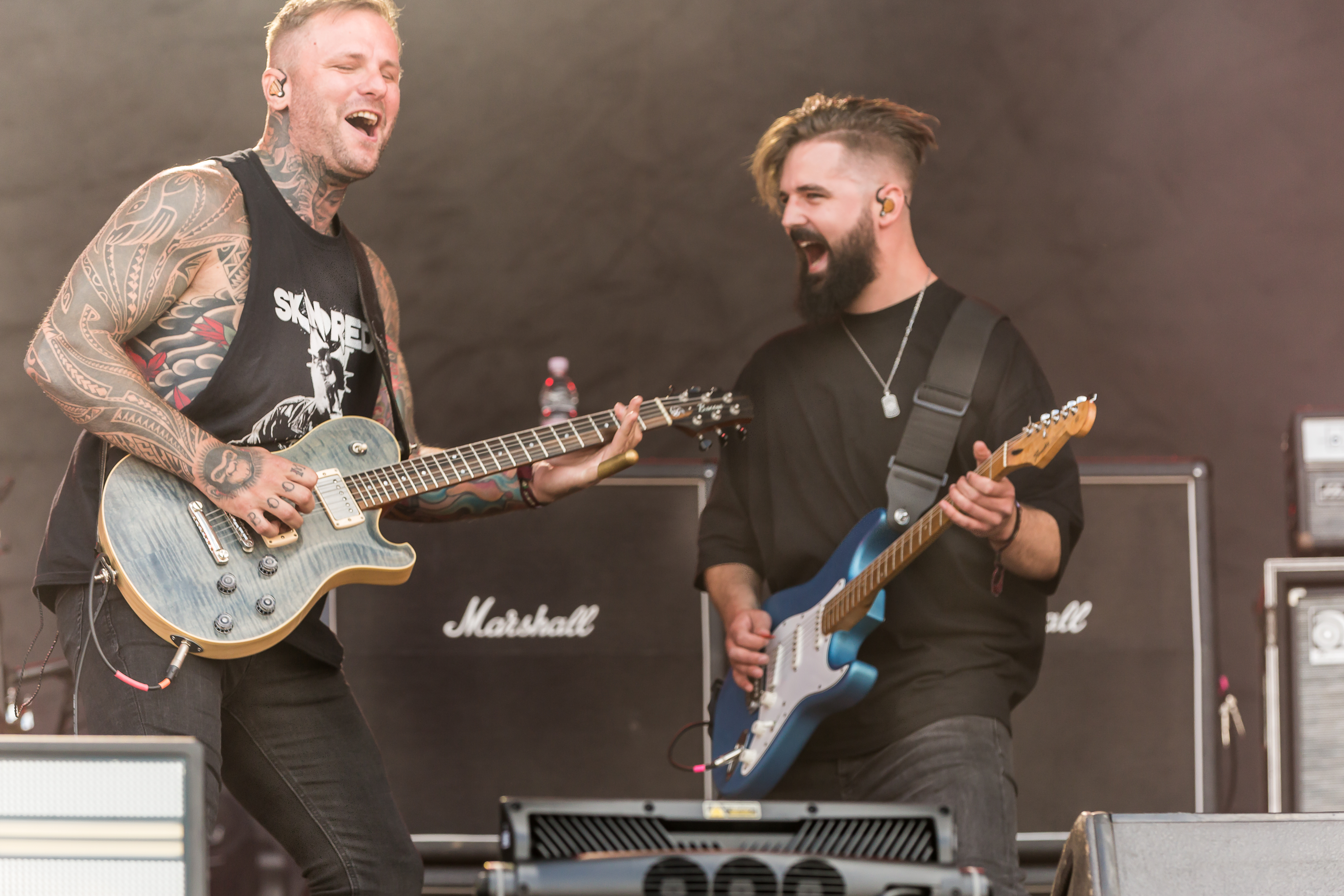
- The band performing in Germany, 2023.

Background information
- Origin: United Kingdom
- Genres: Hard rock; blues rock; alternative rock
- Years active: 2015–present
- Label: Mascot Label Group
- Members: Kris Barras; Josiah J. Manning; Frazer C. Kerslake; Billy Hammett
- Website: krisbarrasband.com

The Kris Barras Band is a British rock band named after its frontman and former MMA fighter Kris Barras. Formed in 2015, the band has released four studio albums.

== History ==
The band is named after its Torquay-born frontman, musician, and former MMA fighter Kris Barras. Barras grew up influenced by his father, Paul Barras, who was also a musician. In August 2014, after competing in 20 professional Muay Thai and MMA fights, Barras retired to concentrate on training other fighters. In early 2015, Barras began writing songs and formed the Kris Barras Band, performing a mixture of southern rock, blues, and country music styles.

After releasing a self-titled demo EP in 2015, the band recorded their first full-length album Lucky 13, released on 24 April 2016. The album was self-released and recorded by Barras in his own studio in Torquay, Devon. This led to the band performing at several large festivals including the 37th Rawa Blues Festival in Katowice, Poland, and Ramblin' Man Fair in Maidstone, UK alongside ZZ Top, Extreme, Rival Sons, and UFO, eventually becoming the only band to perform three consecutive years.

On 4 December 2017, it was announced that Barras had signed to Mascot Label Group and subsequently released their first album on the label, The Divine and Dirty, on 23 March 2018. The album reached number 3 in the Official Charts UK Jazz/Blues and number 72 in the UK iTunes charts for all genres. The album won "Best Album" in the 38th European Blues Awards. The band were also the winners of the "Best New Band" in the 2019 Planet Rock Radio 'The Rocks' 2019 awards. Barras was invited to perform a live session consisting of two songs on the BBC Radio 2 Michael Ball show.

The success of this album led to tours with artists such as Beth Hart, Joanne Shaw Taylor and GUN. Barras was named as one of "The 17 Best Blues Guitarists in the World" by MusicRadar. He was voted number 13, alongside names such as Joe Bonamassa and John Mayer.

In May 2019, the Barras band toured as part of the "Rockin' the Blues" Festival alongside Jonny Lang and Walter Trout. The tour dates took place in the UK, Germany, and France. The band was also featured on the Rockin' The Blues CD release to coincide with the tour. Later that year, the band joined Black Stone Cherry on their Summer tour of the UK/Ireland as their special guest. They also opened for Black Stone Cherry on their 2021 British tour, including at the Royal Albert Hall on 21 September.

On 13 September 2019, the band released their third studio album, Light It Up through Provogue Records. The album reached number 30 on British iTunes, number 49 in the Official UK Charts as well as Number 1 in on the UK Independent Album Breakers Chart.

On 3 September 2021, the band released a new song, "Dead Horses," alongside its music video. This was followed on 1 November 2021 with the announcement of their new single "My Parade" and the upcoming album Death Valley Paradise. "Parade" ascended to number 1 on Planet Rock radio's airplay chart. This was followed by two additional singles: "These Voices," and "Who Needs Enemies." The album was released through Mascot Records on 4 March 2022, and debuted at No. 27 on the UK Albums Chart.

in September 2023 the band signed to Earache Records securing a worldwide deal.

== Discography ==
Albums

- Lucky 13 (2016)
- The Divine and Dirty (2018)
- Light It Up (2019)
- Death Valley Paradise (2022)
- Halo Effect (2024)
- Monsters We Made (2026)
