= Download Festival =

Rock festival in England

Coordinates: 52°49′47.3″N 1°22′46.4″W

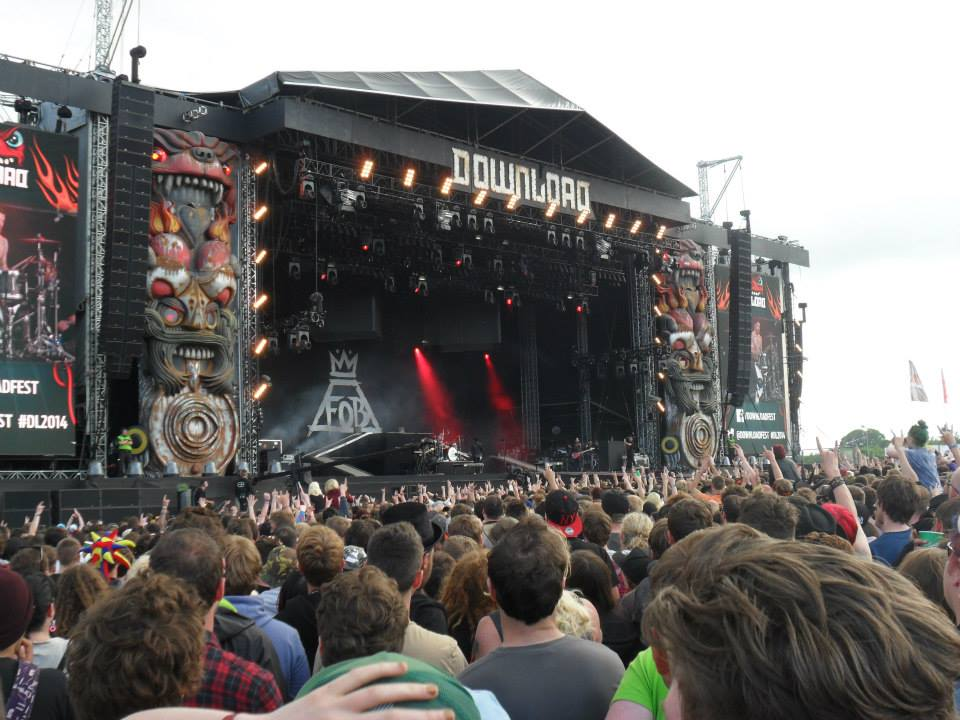
- Download Festival 2014
- Genre: Hard rock, heavy metal, metalcore, punk, alternative rock
- Dates: June
- Locations: Donington Park, Leicestershire, England
- Years active: 2003–present
- Attendance: 75,000–80,000 (average); 100,000–130,000 (2023; record)
- Capacity: 80,000
- Organiser: Live Nation; Far and Beyond Events; Festival Republic (until 2023)
- Website: downloadfestival.co.uk

Download Festival is an open-air rock and metal festival held each June since 2003 at Donington Park in Leicestershire, England. It is the United Kingdom's largest rock festival, with more than 100 bands playing on several stages and 75,000–80,000 attendees in recent years. The site covers around 900 acres (360 ha) and includes a large 'village' area with stalls, bars and entertainment. It surrounds Donington racetrack and is beside East Midlands Airport. Between 2016 and 2022 it was held in multiple locations as well as Donington: this included Paris (France), Madrid (Spain), Hockenheimring (Germany), Sydney and Melbourne (Australia). The festival has hosted some of the biggest rock and metal bands.

Download was created by Andy Copping as a successor to Monsters of Rock, which had been held at Donington until 1996. The festival is owned by Live Nation, and was run by Festival Republic until 2023; now being run by Far And Beyond. It is one of the very few open-air metal festivals in the UK, and is similar to the nearby Bloodstock Festival, but Download is much larger and has a broader range of genres as well as more mainstream acts.

== History ==
The Download Festival was conceived as a follow-up to the Monsters of Rock festivals which had been held at the Donington Park circuit between 1980 and 1996. The first Download Festival was created by Stuart Galbraith and co-booked by Andy Copping in 2003 in the same location. Download was initially a two-day event, expanding to three days in 2005.

The name Download was chosen for the festival for two reasons. Downloading was a dirty word in the music industry at the time, due to file sharing, and rock is seen as a rebellious genre of music. Download festivals were meant to be Monsters of Rock festivals for the 21st century, also having the internet provide connectivity with its audience.

The 2003 festival tickets included a code that allowed festival-goers to download tracks from bands that had performed. Although this feature was discontinued in later years, the festival organizers have cultivated an online community through the Download Festival Forums. Originally a platform for fans and critics to share their views, the forums have become an integral part of the festival, with regular contributions from festival director John Probyn and promoter Andy Copping. They also facilitate face-to-face feedback through Fan Forum meetings (started in 2006) and organise events such as the Boardie BBQ (from 2006), the Boardie Takeover night (2009), football tournaments, and a pub quiz for R.I.P. campers who arrive on Wednesday night.

When Download began, it took place on the Donington Park circuit infield as had Monsters of Rock. However, in 2008 developments for Formula One meant that the infield was no longer suitable as a festival site. The festival moved to the "Sunday Markets" site to the west of the circuit. Although adequate, numbers were limited and the location of the campsite meant that getting from tents to the arena was quite a hike. 2009 saw the arena move to a much more suitable location to the south of the circuit and has remained there every year since. In 2019 the capacity was 111,000. Security for the festival has constantly been undertaken by professional crowd management specialists Specialised Security, although the campsite area has had various contractors throughout.

From 2009 to 2019 and returning in 2021, there has been on-site radio broadcasting from Rock Radio on 87.7FM. This RSL broadcast has aired music from festival bands, interviews and news to the festival site and the surrounding area, with the signal reaching as far as Nottingham.

=== The Download Dog ===
The Download Dog is the official mascot of the Download Festival and appears on a wide range of material related to the festival, such as tickets, stage banners, merchandise, marketing, and the official Download website.

== Overview by year ==
Overview of Download Festival UK
| Event | Year | Date | Headliners | Notes |
|---|---|---|---|---|
| 1st | 2003 | 31 May – 1 June | Iron Maiden and Audioslave | |
| 2nd | 2004 | 5–6 June | Linkin Park and Metallica | A smaller Download was also held in Glasgow |
| 3rd | 2005 | 10–12 June | Feeder, Black Sabbath and System of a Down | Festival extended to three days |
| 4th | 2006 | 9–11 June | Tool, Metallica and Guns N' Roses | Riot police arrived at the end of the festival to stop campers who had started fires |
| 5th | 2007 | 8–10 June | My Chemical Romance, Linkin Park and Iron Maiden | |
| 6th | 2008 | 13–15 June | Kiss, The Offspring and Lostprophets | The arena moved out of the racetrack infield |
| 7th | 2009 | 12–14 June | Faith No More, Slipknot and Def Leppard | The arena moved to its current site |
| 8th | 2010 | 11–13 June | AC/DC, Rage Against the Machine and Aerosmith | AC/DC performed on their own stage |
| 9th | 2011 | 10–12 June | Def Leppard, System of a Down and Linkin Park | |
| 10th | 2012 | 8–10 June | The Prodigy, Metallica and Black Sabbath | |
| 11th | 2013 | 14–16 June | Slipknot, Iron Maiden and Rammstein | |
| 12th | 2014 | 13–15 June | Avenged Sevenfold, Linkin Park and Aerosmith | |
| 13th | 2015 | 12–14 June | Slipknot, Muse and Kiss | Police facial recognition was used, and RFID tags were mandatory this year |
| 14th | 2016 | 10–12 June | Rammstein, Black Sabbath and Iron Maiden | A smaller Download was also held in Paris |
| 15th | 2017 | 9–11 June | System of a Down, Biffy Clyro and Aerosmith | A smaller Download was also held in Paris and Madrid |
| 16th | 2018 | 8–10 June | Avenged Sevenfold, Guns N' Roses and Ozzy Osbourne | A smaller Download was also held in Paris, Madrid and Melbourne |
| 17th | 2019 | 14–16 June | Def Leppard, Slipknot and Tool | Torrential rain left Donington extremely muddy; a smaller Download was also held in Madrid and Melbourne |
| Cancelled | 2020 | 12–14 June | Kiss, Iron Maiden and System of a Down | Cancelled due to the COVID-19 pandemic |
| 18th | 2021 | 18–20 June | Frank Carter and the Rattlesnakes, Enter Shikari and Bullet For My Valentine | Festival cancelled due to the COVID-19 pandemic; replaced with smaller test event of UK-only bands |
| 19th | 2022 | 10–12 June | Kiss, Iron Maiden and Biffy Clyro | A smaller Download was also held in Germany and Japan |
| 20th | 2023 | 8–11 June | Metallica (x2), Bring Me the Horizon and Slipknot | Festival extended to four days for 20th anniversary |
| 21st | 2024 | 14–16 June | Queens of the Stone Age, Fall Out Boy and Avenged Sevenfold | Running of the festival changed from Festival Republic to Far and Beyond Events. |
| 22nd | 2025 | 13–15 June | Green Day, Sleep Token and Korn | |
| 23rd | 2026 | 12–14 June | Limp Bizkit, Guns N' Roses and Linkin Park | |
| 24th | 2027 | 11-13 June | Blink-182, Bring Me the Horizon and Evanescence | |

== 2003 ==
The first Download was held on 31 May – 1 June 2003. The original headliners were Iron Maiden and Limp Bizkit, although the latter pulled out and were replaced by Audioslave. Metallica attempted to step in as headliners, but were unable to do so, owing to headlining that year's Reading and Leeds Festivals. Instead, having performed an exclusive club show in London the night before, they played an unannounced "secret slot" in the afternoon on the second stage, with no soundcheck. "Sunday belonged to Metallica," wrote Mick Middles in Classic Rock. "At 3.15 the band were fired into the heart of the festival. Before me, a nonplussed, earplugged infant was held aloft. Somehow it seemed historical. Debuting selections from St. Anger, Metallica swept into a 90-minute frenzy so irresistible that even the Hells Angels were seen clapping in wholehearted appreciation at the end. The coup was complete."

Chevelle were scheduled to play the Scuzz stage on Sunday but pulled out at the last minute. Instruction, playing their second set of the festival, stepped in as the replacements.

Saturday 31 May
| Main Stage | Scuzz Stage |
| Iron Maiden; Marilyn Manson; Deftones; Ministry; InMe; Murderdolls; Amen; Funeral for a Friend; Stampin' Ground; Shadows Fall; Murder One | A Reel Big Fish; Taproot; Sepultura; Reef; HIM; SOiL; The Hellacopters; SikTh; 3 Colours Red; From Autumn to Ashes; QueenAdreena; Violent Delight; Arch Enemy; Chimaira |

Sunday 1 June
| Main Stage | Scuzz Stage |
| Audioslave; Zwan; Flint; Apocalyptica; Less Than Jake; Disturbed; Stone Sour; Evanescence; Mudvayne; Spineshank; The Darkness; One Minute Silence; Raging Speedhorn; Instruction | NOFX; Boysetsfire; The Bouncing Souls; Strung Out; Thrice; Spunge; T.S.O.L. The Real McKenzies; Metallica; The Eighties Matchbox B-Line Disaster; Brand New; Instruction; Beatsteaks; Randy; Fabulous Disaster |

== 2004 ==
=== Donington ===
The 2004 edition of the festival was held on 5–6 June. Another stage was added to the festival, bringing the total to three. Seventy-two bands played over the two days. The 2004 event was also notable for several last minute hitches. First, SOiL got lost on the way to Donington and missed their main stage appearance on Saturday (they later joined Drowning Pool on stage to perform Drowning Pool's "Bodies" and their own song "Halo"). Static-X missed their slot due to a bus breakdown. On Sunday, Slayer arrived on time, but their equipment did not, leading to a slot change from the middle of the afternoon on the main stage to a later slot (and longer set) on the second stage. Slayer were replaced on the main stage by Damageplan, who were scheduled to play the second stage. Their setlist ended with a rendition of Damageplan founders Vinnie Paul and Dimebag Darrell's most recognisable song from Pantera, "Walk."

The biggest news came from the headliners Metallica, when Lars Ulrich was rushed to hospital. Taking to the stage an hour and a half late, James Hetfield explained the situation with Ulrich and the show then began with Slayer drummer Dave Lombardo playing on "Battery" and "The Four Horsemen." Slipknot's Joey Jordison played the rest of the set apart from Fade to Black which was played by Metallica's drum technician, Flemming Larsen.

The full line-up included:

Saturday 5 June
| Main Stage | Snickers "Game On" Stage | Barfly Stage |
| Linkin Park; Sum 41; Iggy and the Stooges; The Hives; The Distillers; Cradle of Filth; Monster Magnet; Opeth; The Dillinger Escape Plan | Pennywise; Electric Six; Wildboyz; Arch Enemy; Biffy Clyro; Million Dead; Instruction; 36 Crazyfists; Akercocke; Viking Skull; Powder; D-Void; The Bled | Peaches; International Noise Conspiracy; Ikara Colt thisGirl; Roxy Saint; The Glitterati; Surferosa; Burst; Lowfive; Yourcodenameis:Milo; Bullet for My Valentine; The Holiday Plan; Hiding Place; Fireapple Red |

Sunday 6 June
| Main Stage | Snickers "Game On" Stage | Barfly Stage |
| Metallica; Korn; Slipknot; Machine Head; Damageplan; Soulfly; Ill Niño; Turbonegro; Breed 77 | HIM; Bowling for Soup; Taking Back Sunday; Slayer; Life of Agony; Brides of Destruction; Drowning Pool; Hatebreed; Hoobastank; Trapt; Silvertide; Ricky Warwick; Terra Diablo | Suicide Girls; Young Heart Attack; Span; The Sounds; Dirty Americans; Recover; Amplifier; Do Me Bad Things; Danko Jones; The Black Dahlia Murder; Mooney Suzuki; Gonga; Hurricane Party; Planet of Women |

=== Scotland ===
In June 2004 a two-day Download Festival was held on Glasgow Green, several days before the Donington event. This had a limited line up with only nine bands performing over a two-day period. The bands which did play included the headliners, Metallica and Linkin Park. Download Scotland also saw an appearance from the Welsh rock band Lostprophets who did not perform at Donington.

Acts which also appeared over the two days at Download Scotland were Korn, Slipknot, Iggy and the Stooges, Machine Head, the Distillers and HIM.

The running order went as follows:

| Wednesday 2 June | Thursday 3 June |
|---|---|
| Metallica; Slipknot; Korn; HIM | Linkin Park; Lostprophets; Iggy and the Stooges; The Distillers; Machine Head |

== 2005 ==
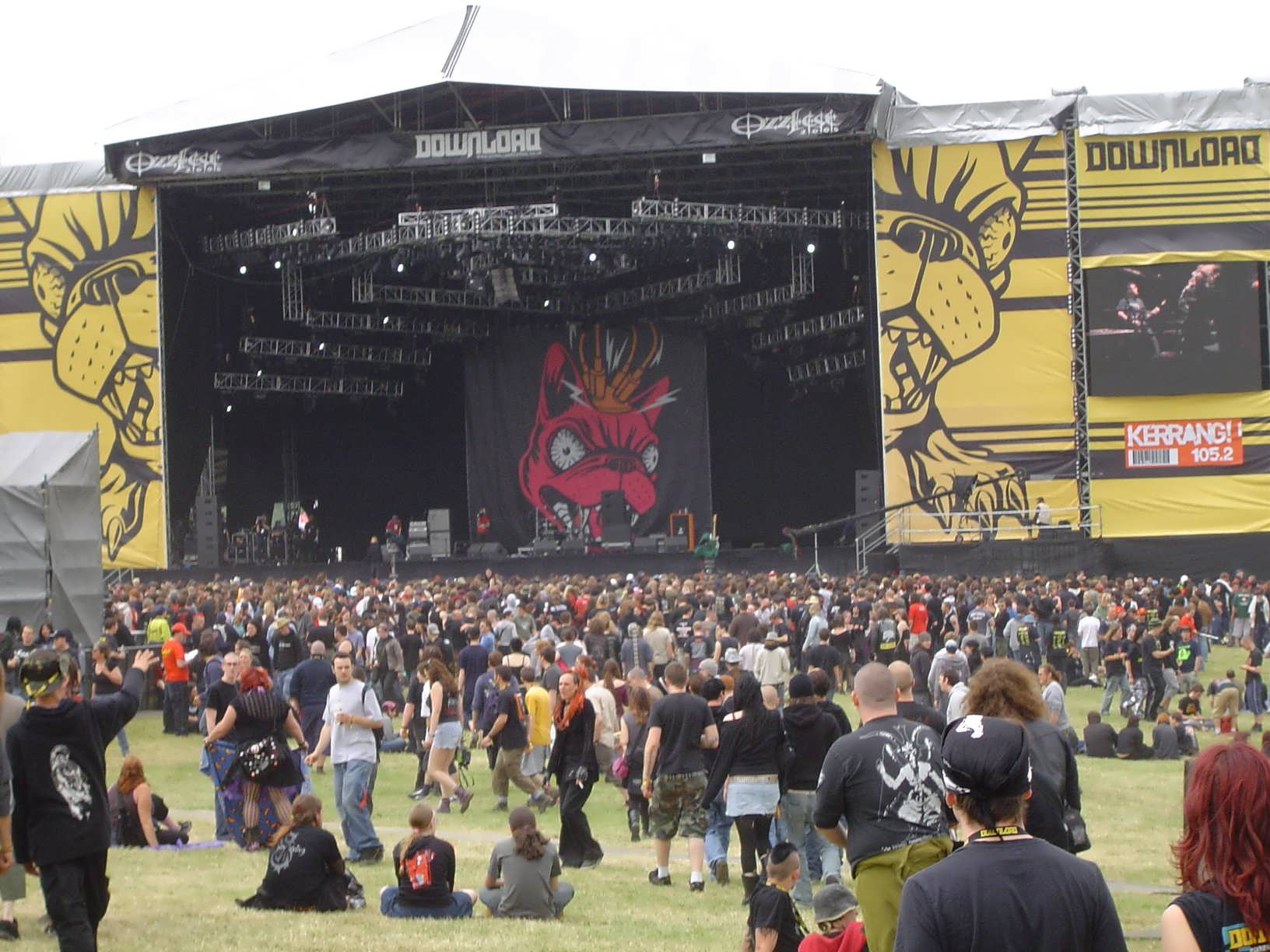
A view of the Main Stage at Download Festival 2005

Download 2005 was held again at Donington Park, on 10–12 June 2005. This festival was different from previous years as the Saturday was officially dubbed Ozzfest 2005, as well as an "Indie day" on the first day of the festival.

Billy Idol performed on the Snickers stage on the Friday night, his first UK gig after a lengthy hiatus, performing songs such as White Wedding, Rebel Yell and a cover version of Van Halen's anthem, Jump.

Feeder's frontman Grant Nicholas was so relieved the band had won the crowd over (there were concerns that they would be received badly by the traditional attendees to the festival), he decided to smash his green Fender Jazzmaster guitar after "Descend" was performed. He later said that he regretted it, but also said he kept the neck and the tremeloes, and might use what was left to make a new guitar. In a July 2010 interview with Kerrang!, it was suggested to Nicholas that he destroyed the guitar as he was frustrated at trying to win the crowd over, as their music was different from the Download demographic, but claimed himself in reply to this that he "Wanted to do the most rock and roll thing after eventually winning over the crowd". In the same interview, Nicholas said that they were "guinea pigs" at the festival as part of the organisers experiment to make it an alternative festival, but said it was a moment of the band's career he is still proud of.

Lemmy also took to the stage, with former MC5 members, and Gilby Clarke, to perform Back in the USA.

Initially, Bert McCracken of the Used and Gerard Way of My Chemical Romance were asked to perform their cover of Under Pressure by Queen and David Bowie, but the former friends refused the offer to perform the cover as they had recently fallen out.

The official line-up included:

Friday 10 June
| Main Stage | Snickers Stage | Napster Stage | Snickers Bowl Stage |
| Feeder; Garbage; Dinosaur Jr; Megadeth; Biffy Clyro; The Others; JJ72; Idiot Pilot; Wednesday 13; Queen Adreena | Billy Idol; The Used; My Chemical Romance; InMe; The Bled; Apocalyptica; Underøath; Lordi; Fozzy; Flogging Molly | Napalm Death; Raging Speedhorn; Paradise Lost; A Change of Pace; Hurricane Party; Tokyo Dragons; Colour of Fire; Slunt; Just a Word; Crashdïet; Planet of Women | Tat; Ellis; The Mascara Story |

Saturday 11 June
| Main Stage | Snickers Stage | Napster Stage | Snickers Bowl Stage |
| Black Sabbath; Velvet Revolver; HIM; Anthrax; Alter Bridge; Bowling for Soup; A The Mad Capsule Markets; The Dwarves; Trivium | In Flames; Chimaira; Lamb of God; Bullet for My Valentine; Meshuggah; Unearth; Every Time I Die; Open Hand; American Head Charge; The Hurt Process; Hondo Maclean; Three Children Of Fortune | Helmet; The Lucky Nine; Breed 77; The Explosion; Towers of London; Johnny Truant; The Ga Ga's; The Answer; Panic Cell; Crucified Barbara; Diamond Nights; Quit Your Dayjob; City on Fire; S.A. Sanctuary | Reuben; Days Of Worth; Fastlane |

Sunday 12 June
| Main Stage | Snickers Stage | Napster Stage | Snickers Bowl Stage |
| System of a Down; Slipknot; Slayer; Nightwish; Killswitch Engage; Papa Roach; Mudvayne; Society 1 DV8 | Motörhead; DKT/MC5; Funeral for a Friend; Lacuna Coil; Mastodon; Shadows Fall; Helmet; Caliban; As I Lay Dying; Gizmachi; Send More Paramedics; The Mascara Story | Therapy? Team Sleep; Eighties Matchbox B-Line Disaster; The Dresden Dolls; The Glitterati; The Saints; Engerica; 3 Inches of Blood; Still Remains; No Hope in New Jersey; Acidtone; Henry Rollins | Electric Eel Shock; The Suffrajets; Johnny Panic |

== 2006 ==
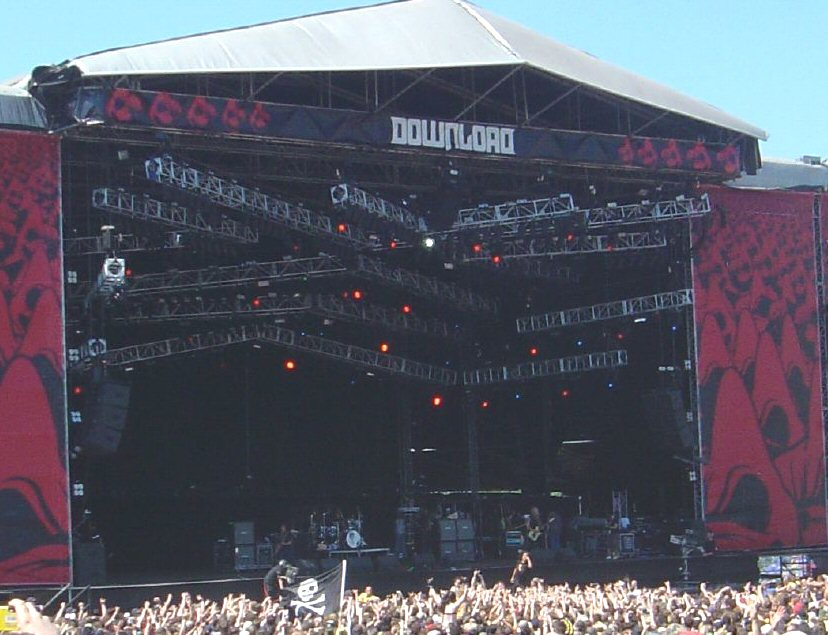
Alice in Chains at Download Festival 2006

The 2006 Download Festival was held at Donington Park, England on 9–11 June. The headlining acts (Tool, Metallica and Guns N' Roses) have sales of approximately 200–250 million albums between them, more than the entire line up of 2006's V Festival.

2006 was the first time the festival was mirrored in the Republic of Ireland, as Download Festival Ireland. 2006 was also by far the warmest year Download has ever had.

During the festival Korn vocalist Jonathan Davis was rushed to hospital. Similar to 2004's Metallica set, Munky, Fieldy and David Silveria arrived and explained to the fans why Davis could not make it and played with guest vocalists Corey Taylor from Slipknot, Dez Fafara from DevilDriver, Jesse Hasek from 10 Years, Benji Webbe from Skindred, M. Shadows from Avenged Sevenfold, and Matt Heafy from Trivium. Lyrics from the song "Blind" were displayed on the screen for Matt Heafy. Metallica played the album Master of Puppets in its entirety in honour of its twentieth anniversary. Guns N' Roses also performed material from the long forthcoming Chinese Democracy album.

Main Stage The main stage was situated in the centre of the arena with crowd control moving around it, and was the largest of all three stages, the safety barriers used at this stage were in a T shape so as to avoid crowd crush in the middle. The stage was open-air and named in honour of the 25th anniversary of Kerrang! magazine. Down played an unannounced set on Saturday (With the laminates showing ??? in their time slot); opening up the Main Stage.

Snickers Stage The Snickers Stage was situated in a tent, behind the main stage and was the second largest stage at the festival. Access to the stage was via a one-way system which attempted to spread people around the site, rather than all attempting to push through a rather small space.

Soilwork were scheduled to play on Sunday, but were replaced by DevilDriver (playing their second set of the festival).

Gibson/Myspace Stage The Myspace stage was the smallest of the three and under a smaller tent. It was positioned across from the front of the main stage.

Friday 9 June
| Main Stage | Snickers Stage | Gibson/Myspace Stage | Snickers Bowl Stage |
| Tool; Deftones; Coheed and Cambria; Soulfly; Strapping Young Lad; SOiL; Wicked Wisdom; Amplifier | The All-American Rejects; Atreyu; InMe; Clutch; Fishbone; Dredg; Bleeding Through; Gojira; Throwdown; Suns of the Tundra | Ginger & the Sonic Circus; Backyard Babies; Cathedral; Engerica; Bullets & Octane; My Awesome Compilation; Animal Alpha; The Audition; Art of Dying; Enter Shikari; Kitty Hudson | Gay for Johnny Depp; Keiko; SinTuition |

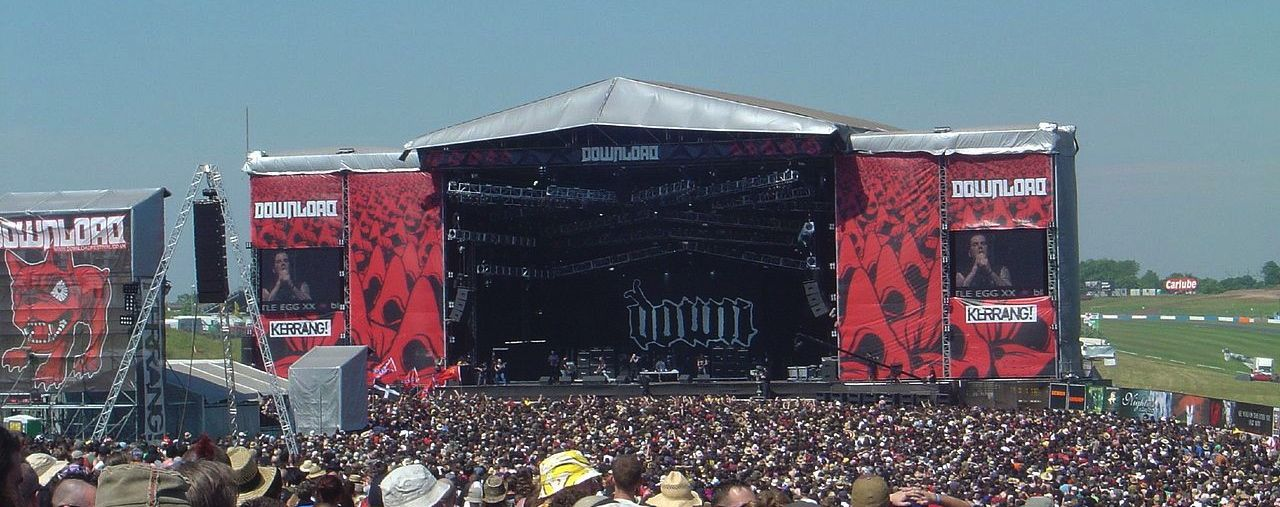
Down playing on the main stage

Saturday 10 June
| Main Stage | Snickers Stage | Gibson/Myspace Stage | Snickers Bowl Stage |
| Metallica; Korn; Trivium; Avenged Sevenfold; Stone Sour; Alice in Chains; Arch Enemy; Bloodsimple; Satyricon; Down | Alter Bridge; Opeth; Within Temptation; Secret Machines; Billy Talent; Henry Rollins; DevilDriver; SikTh; Johnny Truant; Khoma | Killing Joke; Reuben; Mondo Generator; Louie; This Is Menace; 10 Years; Flyleaf; Manic; It Dies Today; Living Things; Exit Ten; Colon Open Bracket; Stonegard; My Alamo | Get Cape. Wear Cape. Fly getAmped; The Hedrons |

Sunday 11 June
| Main Stage | Snickers Stage | Gibson/Myspace Stage | Snickers Bowl Stage |
| Guns N' Roses; Funeral for a Friend; Bullet for My Valentine; Cradle of Filth; Lacuna Coil; In Flames; 36 Crazyfists; DragonForce; Hatebreed; Breed 77 | The Prodigy; Alexisonfire; Eighteen Visions; Hundred Reasons; Aiden; Fightstar; From First to Last; DevilDriver; Zebrahead; God Forbid | Sick of it All; Lordi; Skindred; Moneen; Darkest Hour; Blindside; Mendeed; Bring Me the Horizon; Zico Chain; Voodoo Six; Lauren Harris; Winterville; Streetlight Youth; I-Def-I | Viking Skull; Betty Curse; Evergrey |

=== Controversy ===
During the Sunday headline set of Guns N' Roses, bottles were thrown at the band. This caused problems after the band's lead singer, Axl Rose, slipped on the wet surface and a bottle hit bassist Tommy Stinson. Stinson threw his bass, hitting one of the cameramen, and left the stage. He returned after the song and apologised, but warned the crowd that if this activity continued, he would leave for good. There were some disturbances but they eventually died down, and later in the set Rose commented "I'm actually having quite a good time now! I couldn't have said that an hour ago!"

On the final night, fires were started by some festival goers and police were called, arresting twelve people. At around 4 am, the fire brigade arrived to put out a large fire at the gold campsite. A number of people had taken the railings that had been used to separate the campsite area from the path and used them to barricade the road to prevent the fire engines from reaching the main fire. At this point a number of police assembled in riot gear stormed the campsite. The festival director, John Probyn, posted a message on the official website stating that "About 150 people spoiled the end of what had been a great weekend for over 75,000 of us."

== 2007 ==
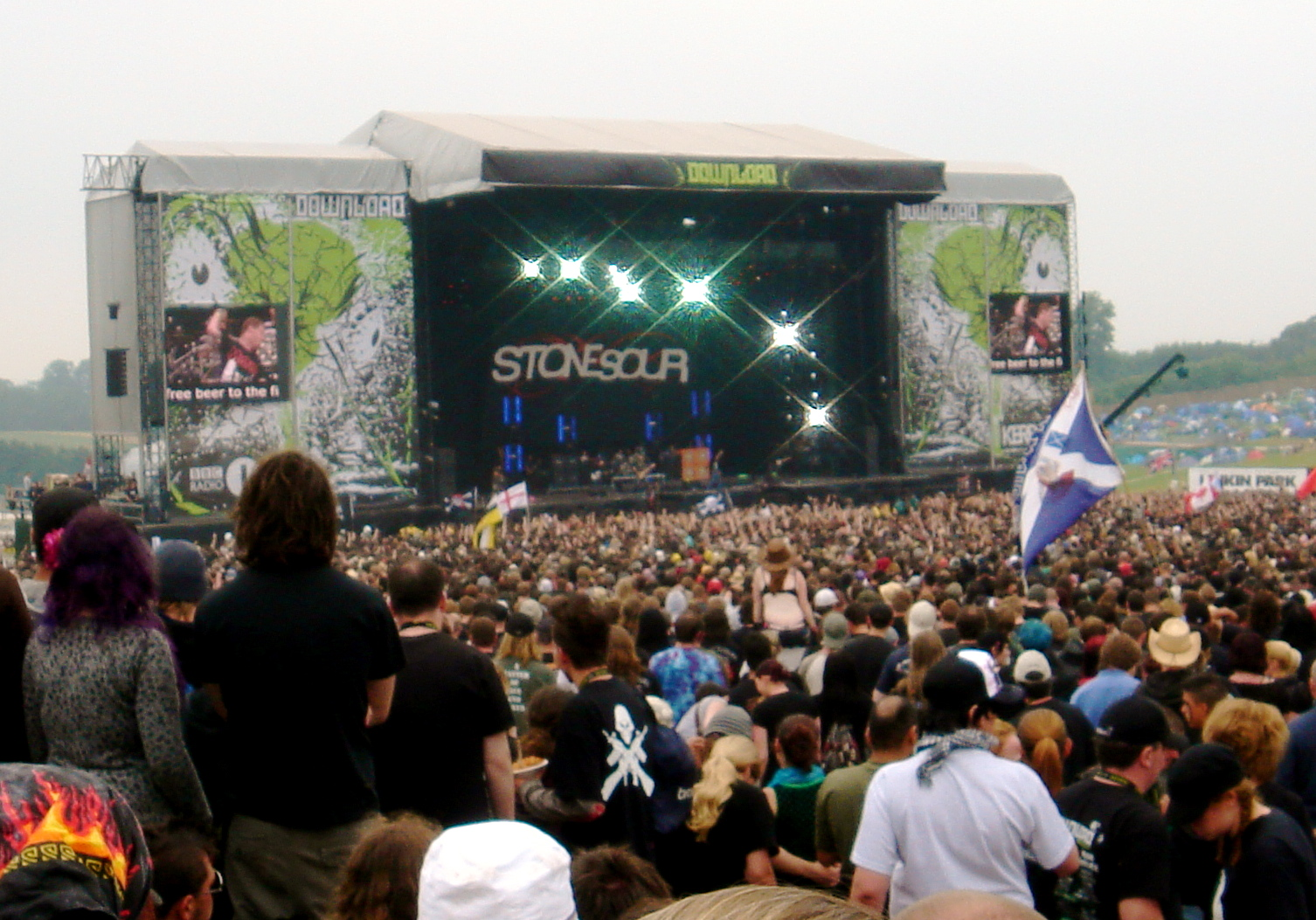
Stone Sour playing the main stage at Download Festival 2007

The 2007 Download Festival took place on 8–10 June 2007.

The three bands that headlined the 2007 festival were My Chemical Romance, Linkin Park and Iron Maiden. Korn's Jonathan Davis stated that the reason for the band returning in 2007 was because of his absence due to illness the previous year. He stated on the official Download Festival website, "I am so looking forward to coming to the Download Festival this year. I was heartbroken to pull out last time. So this time I am very happy to be coming back and we promise to rock the place! I will definitely make-up for missing the last one. You can expect an amazing Korn show!"

Download 2007 was Dimmu Borgir's first ever festival appearance in England. Hardcore Superstar pulled out of their slot on the Tuborg stage on the Sunday because their tour bus broke down in Germany. Download 2007 featured an Indian band Parikrama. They became the first band from India to make it to Donington.

Download 2007 also featured the first band to officially perform on the Thursday of the festival. Scumface played on the Tuborg Stage during the boardie barbecue.

Lamb of God's DVD Walk With Me in Hell features the band's full performance at the festival.

Friday 8 June
| Main Stage | Dimebag Darrell Stage | Tuborg Stage |
| My Chemical Romance; Velvet Revolver; Wolfmother; DragonForce; Megadeth; Hinder; Buckcherry; Zico Chain | Korn; Enter Shikari; Paramore; Porcupine Tree; Saosin; From Autumn to Ashes; Turbonegro; Ill Niño; ANJ | Suicidal Tendencies; Hayseed Dixie; Yourcodenameis:Milo; Job for a Cowboy; The Hedrons; Sanctity; I Was a Cub Scout; The Scare; Neurosonic; This Et Al; Cynic; Fortune Drive; Drive-by Argument |

Saturday 9 June
| Main Stage | Dimebag Darrell Stage | Tuborg Stage |
| Linkin Park; Marilyn Manson; Slayer; Machine Head; Bowling for Soup; Thirty Seconds to Mars; Aiden; Shadows Fall; Hellyeah; Turisas | Mötley Crüe; Satellite Party; Biffy Clyro; My Vitriol; My Dying Bride; Gallows; Anathema; As I Lay Dying; Bring Me the Horizon; Bloodsimple; Elliot Minor; Cat the Dog; S.A. Sanctuary | Head Automatica; Necro; The Answer; Silverstein; Lez Zeppelin; Architects; Priestess; Panic Cell; Beyond All Reason; My Alamo; Damone; Army of Freshmen; Malpractice |

Sunday 10 June
| Main Stage | Dimebag Darrell Stage | Tuborg Stage |
| Iron Maiden; Evanescence; Killswitch Engage; Stone Sour; Lamb of God; Mastodon; Papa Roach; Chimaira; Reuben; Parikrama | Billy Talent; Dream Theater; Dimmu Borgir; Within Temptation; Napalm Death; Paradise Lost; Orange Goblin; DevilDriver; Unearth; Cancer Bats; After Forever; Eyelash | Reel Big Fish; Fastway; Cult of Luna; Lauren Harris; Fair to Midland; Kids in Glass Houses; Between the Trees; Flood of Red; Lights. Action! Still Remains; In This Moment; The Ghost of a Thousand; LostAlone |

== 2008 ==
The 2008 festival took place on 13–15 June. It had a significantly different layout to previous years: the arena area was situated in land to the west of the race track instead of the traditional race track infield area. Among numerous changes, the second stage became larger and moved from a marquee to open-air, on a tarmac car park.

"I am looking forward to humiliating those little boys in little bands who think they count," declared Gene Simmons of Kiss. "We're going to blow their shit to pieces... If U2 or Radiohead are on the bill at Download, then I accept these are good bands. But they will still run for cover when Kiss take the stage, for they are in the presence of a transcendent rock force."

Chris Cornell was scheduled, but cancelled his European tour to focus on a new album. Twin Method, and Finger Eleven were announced but removed from the official website's lineup. On the Friday of the festival, Kid Rock was meant to appear between Seether and Disturbed on the Main Stage but pulled out at the last minute. At first it was announced that this was due to illness. Rock later claimed he left the festival grounds after becoming dissatisfied with the amenities. But, the following year, Download's booker theorised that it had been due to a broken heart. Rock's no-show allowed two bands following him, Disturbed and Judas Priest, to play longer sets.

The 2008 Boardie BBQ took place on the Gibson stage on Thursday 12 June and included a performance by Forever Never.

Friday 13 June
| Main Stage | Tuborg Stage | Gibson Stage |
| Kiss; Judas Priest; Motörhead; Disturbed; Seether; Beat Union; Black Tide | Simple Plan; Rise Against; Rival Schools; The Subways; The Fall of Troy; Comeback Kid; The Black Dahlia Murder; Stone Gods; Zebrahead | The Dillinger Escape Plan; Kill Hannah; Slaves to Gravity; High on Fire; In Case of Fire; Blackhole; Hostile; Firewind; Caimbo; Rolo Tomassi; Lovvers |

Saturday 14 June
| Main Stage | Tuborg Stage | Gibson Stage |
| The Offspring; Incubus; Bullet for My Valentine; Biffy Clyro; Alter Bridge; Madina Lake; 36 Crazyfists; Job for a Cowboy; Skindred; Sign | HIM; Ash; Pendulum; Ace Frehley; Amon Amarth; Bleeding Through; Throwdown; A Day to Remember; The Devil Wears Prada; Alesana; Annotations of an Autopsy; Malefice | Testament; Saxon; Johnny Truant; Fighting With Wire; Brigade; Army of Freshmen; The Haze; Big Linda; The Last Supper; Trigger the Bloodshed; Mexicolas; Go:Audio; Rise to Remain; Verra Cruz |

Sunday 15 June
| Main Stage | Tuborg Stage | Gibson Stage |
| Lostprophets; Jimmy Eat World; Coheed and Cambria; In Flames; Within Temptation; Apocalyptica; Black Stone Cherry; Fightstar; From First to Last; Glamour of the Kill | Cavalera Conspiracy; Children of Bodom; The Wildhearts; Elliot Minor; Kids in Glass Houses; Chiodos; Airbourne; Rose Tattoo; Lethal Bizzle; Municipal Waste; Animal Alpha; Cry for Silence | Jonathan Davis; Valient Thorr; Haunts; August Burns Red; Voodoo Six; Between the Buried and Me; Ted Maul; Canterbury; Exit Ten; The Galvatrons; Sons of Albion; Devil Sold His Soul; Invasion |

== 2009 ==
The 2009 Download Festival took place on 12–14 June at Donington Park with an estimated attendance of 120,000 over 3 days. The arena had once again changed location, this time to an open field area south of the race track which was more suitable and a shorter walking distance from the camping areas than last year.

The headliners were Faith No More (Friday), Slipknot (Saturday) and Def Leppard (Sunday). Sunday had a strong classic rock themed line-up on the main stage with bands such as Whitesnake, ZZ Top and Journey, somewhat reminiscent of Monsters of Rock. This would become a recurring feature in future years. Other notable performers included Limp Bizkit, who were playing in the UK with their original line-up for the first time since 2001, Trivium returning for their third appearance and first head lining spot, Anvil, the band featured in the 2008 film Anvil! The Story of Anvil, and Steel Panther, who were making their first appearance in the UK on the Tuborg Stage. A fourth stage, the "Red Bull Bedroom Jam Stage", also made an appearance at this year's festival. This stage was also present at other UK festivals, such as T in the Park in Balado, Scotland, and the Underage Festival in Victoria Park, London.

The 2009 Boardie BBQ took place in the Red Bull Bedroom Jam Stage on Thursday 11 June. This year the band was Attica Rage.

The Thursday night of the 2009 festival also saw the Boardie Takeover night. Four bands, three DJ's: Cyst, Dave KC and Gabber Fox, solo singers Hevs and TonsO'Fun, a stand-up and a burlesque dancer – all members of the Download Festival Forums – performed to a full house in the End Tent. These bands were Scumface (returning after a successful appearance at the Boardie BBQ in 2007), Orestea, Echovirus and headliners, Silent Descent.

On Monday 18 May the festival confirmed on its official website that Camping tickets had completely sold out.

On 19 May, it was revealed in an interview with Andy Copping on Music Channel Scuzz that there would be secret sets. It was later revealed the bands would be Enter Shikari and Thunder.

On Wednesday 3 June, one week before the campsite opened, Download released a further 2,500 camping tickets. These limited tickets sold out within 24 hours of being released.

The winners of the "Red Bull Bedroom Jam Competition" was Gravesend-based band After the Ordeal. This set was a 'virtual gig', with the band playing live from their bedroom and this footage being streamed live onto the Main Stage at Download Festival, between Pendulum and Marilyn Manson.

The winners of the "Tuborg Battle of the bands" was Leeds punk band Acid Drop and they opened the Tuborg stage on Saturday 13 June.

The Ghost of a Thousand were scheduled to headline the Red Bull Bedroom Jam Stage on Saturday but the band cancelled. the Blackout stepped in to play their slot, thus giving them two slots on the festival's bill.

Slipknot's performance is available in their new DVD (sic)nesses. It was released on 28 September 2010 and served as a tribute to their late bassist Paul Gray. It was Gray's last UK gig with Slipknot before his death in May 2010.

Friday 12 June
| Main Stage | Second Stage | Tuborg Stage | Red Bull Bedroom Jam Stage |
| Faith No More; Korn; Limp Bizkit; Killswitch Engage; Billy Talent; Staind; The Blackout; Hollywood Undead | Mötley Crüe; Opeth; Lacuna Coil; Bring Me the Horizon; Dir En Grey; Parkway Drive; A Day to Remember; In This Moment; Steadlür | Meshuggah; Duff McKagan's Loaded; Backyard Babies; Voivod; Enter Shikari; Middle Class Rut; Lauren Harris; Sylosis; Bleed from Within; Hunting the Minotaur; Sleepercurve | Blackhole; New Device; DissolvedIn; Linchpin; Don Broco; The Outcry Collective; White Man Kamikaze; Young Guns; Tripswitch; The Instigators |

Saturday 13 June
| Main Stage | Second Stage | Tuborg Stage | Red Bull Bedroom Jam Stage |
| Slipknot; Marilyn Manson; Pendulum; DragonForce; Down; Hatebreed; DevilDriver; Five Finger Death Punch; Ripper Owens | The Prodigy; Chris Cornell; You Me at Six; The Answer; Static-X; Fightstar; In Case of Fire; Hardcore Superstar; Symphony Cult; The Crave | Anvil; Architects; Thunder; Lawnmower Deth; Man Raze; General Fiasco; Billy Boy on Poison; Loverman; S.A. Sanctuary; Facecage; Black Spiders; No Americana; Acid Drop | The Blackout; This City; People in Planes; My Passion; The Auteur; None the Less; 13 Riots; Forever Never; Serpico; The Computers; Japanese Voyeurs; Auger Bane |

Sunday 14 June
| Main Stage | Second Stage | Tuborg Stage | Red Bull Bedroom Jam Stage |
| Def Leppard; Whitesnake; ZZ Top; Dream Theater; Journey; Black Stone Cherry; Skin; Tesla; Stone Gods | Trivium; Papa Roach; Buckcherry; Clutch; Shinedown; Volbeat; Karma to Burn; Sevendust; God Forbid; Suicide Silence; Trigger the Bloodshed; Sacred Mother Tongue | Go:Audio; Therapy? The 69 Eyes; Sabbat; Steel Panther; Dear Superstar; Hexes; Hostile; Esoterica; Pulled Apart by Horses; Turbowolf; Violent Soho; Brides | We Are the Ocean; Flood of Red; Exit Avenue; First Strike; Twin Atlantic; Attack! Attack! Logan; Fei Comodo; Jettblack; Million $ Reload; Raucous Jays; Fall from Grace |

== 2010 ==
The Download Festival was confirmed to return to Donington on the weekend 11–13 June 2010, the campsites opening on 9 June. On 25 January, nine bands were announced at the official Download website, including AC/DC as one of the main stage headliners. On 15 February Rage Against the Machine and Aerosmith were confirmed as the other two main stage headliners, as well as 5 more bands confirmed a few hours later.

Saxon performed their 'Wheels of Steel' album in its entirety to commemorate its 30th anniversary. Download 2010 was also the 30th anniversary of rock festivals at Donington Park, since the first one – which Saxon performed at – in 1980.

It was announced on 16 May that the second stage would be renamed "The Ronnie James Dio Stage" in tribute to the singer who died of stomach cancer on the same day. It was also announced that the main stage would be called the Maurice Jones Stage after the co-founder of Monsters of Rock who also died the previous year.

28 May saw 15 more bands added, and an official announcement of the Jägermeister-sponsored fifth stage, which would host acoustic acts, including bands also performing regular sets at the festival. The initially announced Sum 41 cancelled, owing to drummer Steve Jocz being involved in an accident. On 30 May 2010 it was announced that Wolfmother had to cancel due to illness. They were replaced by Killswitch Engage.

Aside from Dio, the year was sadly memorable for other deaths. Y&T performed the Pepsi Max Stage to a jam-packed audience, marking the band's long-anticipated return to Donington after performing at Monsters of Rock in 1984. Download would be bassist Phil Kennemore's last UK show in the UK: he died from lung cancer six months later. Killing For Company drummer Stuart Cable, previously of Stereophonics, died the week of the festival, at which the band were to play.

Ratt were scheduled to play on Sunday, but cancelled due to illness of vocalist Stephen Pearcy. On 9 June, FM were announced as Ratt's replacement.

The Boardie Takeover ran for the second year in a row on Thursday 10 June. It featured the bands Silent Descent, Fallen Fate, Jacknife Holiday and Cyster Scalpel, as well as singers, DJs and a burlesque dancer.

AC/DC played on an exclusive stage next to the Maurice Jones stage, allowing the band to utilise their full stadium show, as announced on 28 May. This marked the first time a headlining band brought their own stage to Donington. All headlining bands on the other stages had finished before AC/DC began. The stage was used only by AC/DC; the next day, the runway at the front was dismantled and the stage remained empty. "I took my son to see AC/DC..." recalled Saxon's Biff Byford. "Watching Angus from out in the crowd was great, and it was a rite of passage for my son."

The final day saw torrential rain. "By the time Aerosmith take the stage," noted Classic Rock, "we're essentially one amorphous mud blob of an organism blinking through the mire towards the bright lights. They, on the other hand, have Steven Tyler, a man whose dress sense... makes Lady Gaga look like a vicar's wife."

Friday 11 June
| AC/DC Stage | Maurice Jones Main Stage | Ronnie James Dio Stage | Pepsi Max Stage | Red Bull Bedroom Jam Stage | Jägermeister Acoustic Stage |
| AC/DC | Them Crooked Vultures; Killswitch Engage; 36 Crazyfists; Unearth | Bullet for My Valentine; Coheed and Cambria; A Day to Remember; Anathema; Trigger the Bloodshed | Job for a Cowboy; As I Lay Dying; Tyketto; Lawnmower Deth; Sweethead; Year Long Disaster | Devil Sold His Soul; Funeral Party; Heights; Never Means Maybe; Taylor Hawkins and the Coattail Riders; Imicus; The Humour | Skin; Jettblack; Sondura; Starseed; Danny Vaughn |

Saturday 12 June
| Maurice Jones Main Stage | Ronnie James Dio Stage | Pepsi Max Stage | Red Bull Bedroom Jam Stage | Jägermeister Acoustic Stage |
| Rage Against the Machine; Deftones; Megadeth; Lamb of God; Five Finger Death Punch; Flyleaf; Atreyu; Hellyeah; Taking Dawn | Thirty Seconds to Mars; HIM; The Blackout; Volbeat; We Are the Fallen; Cancer Bats; My Passion; Rolo Tomassi; Sonic Syndicate; Rise to Remain | Michael Monroe; Skin; Y&T; Senser; Enuff Z'nuff; Halestorm; Rock Sugar; Genitorturers; Reckless Love; Sybreed; Holy Grail; Killing for Company; Godsized | Breed 77; Glamour of the Kill; Kadawatha; This Is Divine; Stand Up Guy; No Mean City; The Dead Lay Waiting; The Plight; Urban Voodoo Machine; Revoker | Reckless Love; Panic Cell; The Humour; The More I See; Dommin; Everything Burns; The Blackout |

Sunday 13 June
| Maurice Jones Main Stage | Ronnie James Dio Stage | Pepsi Max Stage | Red Bull Bedroom Jam Stage | Jägermeister Acoustic Stage |
| Aerosmith; Stone Temple Pilots; Motörhead; Billy Idol; Slash; Cinderella; Saxon; FM; Dommin | Stone Sour; Airbourne; Steel Panther; Porcupine Tree; The Dillinger Escape Plan; The Damned Things; Napalm Death; Switchfoot; August Burns Red; Nonpoint; 3 Inches of Blood; White Wizzard | Suicidal Tendencies; Zebrahead; Young Guns; Die Apokalyptischen Reiter; Whitechapel; The Jim Jones Revue; Esoterica; Your Demise; Crime in Stereo; TAB the Band; The Morning After; S.A. Sanctuary; No Americana; Ben Poole | Panic Cell; Max Raptor; T-34; Starseed; Hearts Under Fire; You And What Army; Sacred Betrayal; Enemo-J; The Virginmarys; Straight Lines; Tiger Please | Ginger Wildheart; Nonpoint; Enuff Z'nuff; DJ Clash (Scott Rowley and Alexander Milas); The Dirty Feel; Ricky Warwick; Taking Dawn |

== 2011 ==
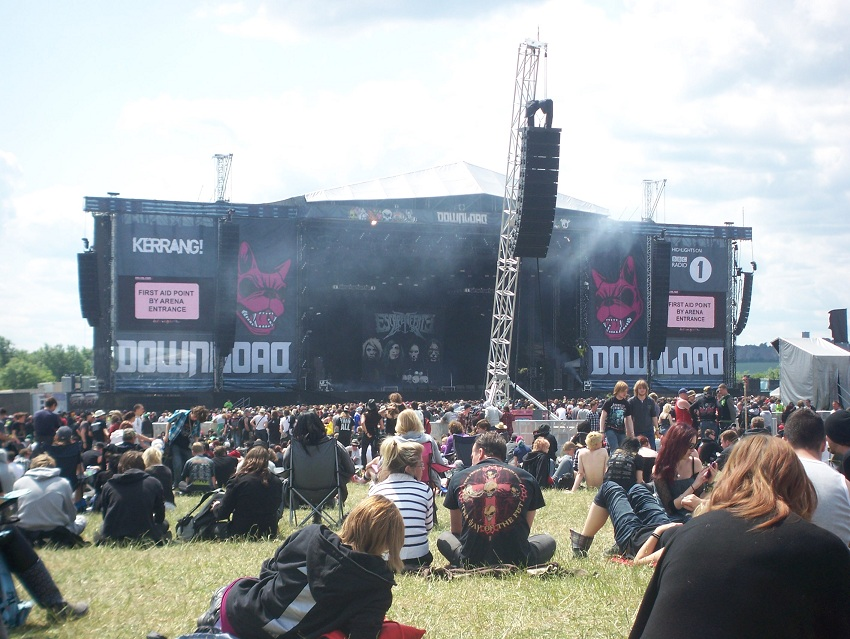
Just before Escape the Fate's set on the main stage at Download Festival 2011

The Download Festival was confirmed to return to Donington on the 10, 11, and 12 June 2011. Linkin Park and System of a Down were the two main stage headliners officially announced, with Saturday subheadliners Avenged Sevenfold and Sunday second stage headliner Rob Zombie announced a short while later.

On 22 February, Def Leppard were announced as Friday's main stage headliner, with Twisted Sister, Down, Duff McKagan's Loaded and Trash Talk also added to the line-up.

15 March saw the Darkness unveiled as the widely speculated Friday subheadliner, with Funeral for a Friend, Plain White T's, Framing Hanley and Hyro Da Hero also added. In April, the Red Bull Bedroom Jam stage and Jägermeister Acoustic stage's acts were revealed.

Wayne Static was scheduled to open up the main stage on the Sunday, but he pulled out a month prior. Masters of Reality were scheduled to perform but pulled out on 30 March and Karma to Burn were to play the second stage on Sunday but were replaced by Hyro Da Hero, thus giving him three sets over the course of the festival; the most in Download history.

Steward 0836 was manning the main stage at the festival, when he caught the attention of fans waiting for Sunday's bands to appear. Some friendly interaction led to cheers from the audience, then one of the giant stage-screens showed him making the "devil horns" gesture, which was applauded by tens of thousands of rock fans. The official Download Festival website even featured him as an artist on their site.

Friday 10 June
| Main Stage | Second Stage | Pepsi Max Stage | Red Bull Bedroom Jam Stage | Jägermeister Acoustic Stage |
| Def Leppard; The Darkness; Alter Bridge; Thin Lizzy; Black Stone Cherry; Duff McKagan's Loaded; Puddle of Mudd; CKY | Pendulum; Korn; Bring Me the Horizon; Children of Bodom; The Damned Things; Anti-Flag; Young Guns; Destroy Rebuild Until God Shows; Evaline | Danzig; Times of Grace; FM; Hyro Da Hero; Asking Alexandria; Lower Than Atlantis; Japanese Voyeurs; Royal Republic; Betraeus; Sweet Savage | Modestep; Envy of the State; OAF; The Hype Theory; Don Broco; Page 44; Hill Valley High; Makethisrelate; Kellermensch | Skindred; The Last Republic; The Dirty Youth; Million $ Reload; Obsessive Compulsive; The Verses |

Saturday 11 June
| Main Stage | Second Stage | Pepsi Max Stage | Red Bull Bedroom Jam Stage | Jägermeister Acoustic Stage |
| System of a Down; Avenged Sevenfold; Skunk Anansie; Down; Hollywood Undead; Skindred; Escape the Fate; All That Remains; The Devil Wears Prada | Alice Cooper; Twisted Sister; Cheap Trick; Mr. Big; Dio Disciples; Clutch; Dan Reed; Rock Sugar; The BossHoss; Rise to Remain; Chthonic; Sacred Mother Tongue | Funeral for a Friend; The King Blues; Sevendust; Evile; Trash Talk; Your Demise letlive. VersaEmerge; Ghost; Straight Line Stitch; TRC; Houston; The Rods | Dangerous! Kill 21; The Dangerous Summer; Dear Superstar; Heights; Blitz Kids; Welcome Wednesday; The Ocean Between Us; The Morning After; Dripback; Fighting Wolves | Bowling for Soup; Dan Reed; Sons of Icarus; Royal Republic; Maiden uniteD; Never Means Maybe; Skin; Intraverse |

Sunday 12 June
| Main Stage | Second Stage | Pepsi Max Stage | Red Bull Bedroom Jam Stage | Jägermeister Acoustic Stage |
| Linkin Park; Bullet for My Valentine; Disturbed; The Gaslight Anthem; The Pretty Reckless; Bowling for Soup; Madina Lake; Biohazard; Suicide Silence | Rob Zombie; The Cult; Black Veil Brides; Buckcherry; Turisas; Gwar; Kvelertak; Hyro Da Hero; Malefice; Yashin; Collapse | Frank Turner; Plain White T's; Silverstein; Framing Hanley; Deaf Havana; T-34; Starseed; My Darkest Days; Sworn Amongst; Hell; Trucker Diablo; Knock Out Kaine; Jameson Raid | H.E.A.T. Baptized in Blood; The Dead Lay Waiting; Illuminatus; ACODA; You and What Army; Floods; Autumn In Disguise; October File; Belligerence; Skeletal Damage | Dave McPherson; Red, White and Blues; Hyro Da Hero; The Morning After; Slaves to Gravity; Heaven's Basement; Voodoo Johnson; Raven Vandelle |

== 2012 ==
On 12 July 2011 it was confirmed via Twitter, and the Download official website that the festival would be staged in 2012 between 8–10 June. Limited early-bird tickets were put on sale on 15 July. It was announced on 10 November via BBC Radio 1 that Metallica would headline the main stage on the Saturday and also that they would be playing their self titled album in its entirety. The next day Black Sabbath were announced to headline the main stage on Sunday 10 June, closing the festival. On 18 November, the Prodigy was announced as the headliner for Friday 8 June.

On 12 April 2012, Download Festival announced on their website, official Facebook page and official Twitter page that the main stage will be named after Jim Marshall who died a week earlier.

Due to the wet and windy conditions on the site, there was a delay in opening the arena on the Friday, resulting in the cancellation/postponement of certain performers.

American heavy metal band Machine Head reportedly broke the festival record for the most circle pits happening during one song, with a reported 29 pits happening at once.

Comedian Bob Slayer, who is a regular on the comedy stage at Download, broke his neck doing a wheelie bin crowd surf stunt whilst entertaining at the festival.

The line-up won an award in the 2012 UK Festival Awards, and festival director John Probyn won a "Lifetime achievement award".

Friday 8 June
| The Jim Marshall Main Stage | Zippo Encore Stage | Pepsi Max Stage | Redbull Bedroom Jam Stage | Jägermeister Acoustic Stage |
| The Prodigy; Chase & Status; Machine Head; Billy Talent; NOFX; Fear Factory | Slash Featuring Myles Kennedy & the Conspirators; Nightwish; Opeth; Little Angels; Terrorvision; The Quireboys; Red, White and Blues | The Devin Townsend Project; AxeWound; SOiL; While She Sleeps; The Defiled; Lawnmower Deth; Hounds; Absolute Power; Silent Descent; Impaled Existence | Cancer Bats; Gallows; The Safety Fire; Voodoo Six; Marmozets; Upon a Burning Body; Dive Bella Dive; Reachback; Dead Harts; The Jellycats; Broken | Yashin; Skindred; Breed 77; Million Dollar Reload; Neonfly; With One Last Breath |

Saturday 9 June
| The Jim Marshall Main Stage | Zippo Encore Stage | Pepsi Max Stage | Redbull Bedroom Jam Stage | Jägermeister Acoustic Stage |
| Metallica; Biffy Clyro; Tenacious D Steel Panther; Trivium; Black Veil Brides; Saxon; As I Lay Dying | You Me at Six; Killswitch Engage; Skindred; Kids in Glass Houses; Theory of a Deadman; Four Year Strong; Lower Than Atlantis; Turbonegro; Ginger Wildheart; Halestorm; Fozzy; Page 44 | The Mission; The Union; Corey Taylor; Sylosis; My Passion; The Treatment; Anti-Nowhere League; Gun; The Yo-Yos; Turbowolf; Don Broco; Avosetta; No Americana | Cockney Rejects; Fearless Vampire Killers; LostAlone; Mallory Knox; Butcher Babies; ACODA; Never Means Maybe; I Divide; Golden Tanks; 4Arm; Freebase; Royal Cartel | Tyla; The Quireboys; Toby Jepson; Heaven's Basement; Red, White & Blues; SOiL; Gun; Six Hour Sundown |

Sunday 10 June
| The Jim Marshall Main Stage | Zippo Encore Stage | Pepsi Max Stage | Redbull Bedroom Jam Stage | Jägermeister Acoustic Stage |
| Black Sabbath; Soundgarden; Megadeth; Lamb of God; Black Label Society; Anthrax; Kyuss Lives! DevilDriver; Stellar Revival | Rise Against; Dropkick Murphys; Refused; Shinedown; Ugly Kid Joe; Sebastian Bach; Rival Sons; August Burns Red; We Are the Ocean; Black Spiders; Kobra and the Lotus | Periphery; Ghost; Firewind; Emmure; La Dispute; The JCQ; Shadows Fall; Edguy; Reckless Love; Heaven's Basement; Feed the Rhino; Skarlett Riot | William Control; Hawk Eyes; The Dirty Youth; The Minutes; With One Last Breath; Kopek; You and What Army; Strangle Kojak; Adelaide; Mechanical Smile; PitchBlack; Kamchatka | Saint Jude; Fearless Vampire Killers; Furyon; Mordecai; Daken; Voodoo Johnson; Sanguine; White Powder Gold |

Five Finger Death Punch were scheduled to perform on Sunday on the Main Stage between DevilDriver and Kyuss Lives! but on 5 April they pulled out due to logistical difficulties. Anthrax, who were initially set to play on the Zippo Encore Stage, were brought up to the main stage (later dubbed the Jim Marshall stage) due to Five Finger Death Punch's cancellation.

T. Mills was scheduled to perform on Saturday on the Red Bull stage but pulled out in May and also Porter Robinson, who was also set to play on the same stage on the Friday pulled out due to the recording of a new album. He was replaced by Voodoo Six.

=== Problems ===
Due to the wet and windy weather, Download did not open its Arena gates on Friday 8 June until 14:00 whilst laying down straw in the Arena and removing potentially dangerous signs and banners which could prove hazardous in high winds, meaning some of the bands were shifted around. Cancer Bats were moved from second opening band on the Jim Marshall Stage to a headline slot on the Red Bull Bedroom Jam Stage, with Rise to Remain and Six Hour Sundown missing out on a slot entirely. Fear Factory were also given an additional 10 minutes of performance time due to Cancer Bats being relocated to a different stage and Rise to Remain being cancelled. Europe were scheduled to play the Zippo Encore stage on Friday before Little Angels, but it was announced at the last minute that they will not be able to perform due to traffic and transportation issues. Much criticism was aimed at the organisers for not preparing better as the poor weather occurred before the festival goers arrived. Also the conditions in the camping and arena meant that many fans who required disabled access were left stuck in the mud requiring help from their fellow fans to reach their destination, or even the toilets, often with little to no help from organisers.

== 2013 ==
The eleventh annual Download festival was confirmed for 14–16 June 2013. Early bird tickets went on sale 15 June 2012, where a newly implemented deposit scheme was introduced; which allowed customers to pay for their ticket(s) over three payments rather than one. Iron Maiden were announced as the Saturday headliner on 20 September 2012 to commemorate 25 Years since first appearing and headlining Monsters of Rock in 1988 on Seventh Tour of a Seventh Tour . Rammstein let slip on the same day that they will be headlining Download on the Sunday, which was confirmed by the festival organisers the following morning. Seven days later it was confirmed via Andy Copping (festival promoter) that Slipknot would be the Friday headliner. From 5 November, bands started to be announced sporadically via Facebook, Scuzz TV, BBC Radio 1, Kerrang! Magazine and the personal Twitter account of Andy Copping.

Goldsboro were due to be playing at the festival, but on 19 February they confirmed they would not be able to perform. After the Burial were scheduled to perform on the Red Bull Studios stage, but pulled out on 17 May in order to focus on their new album.

On 28 May, Skin and Red, White & Blues cancelled their appearances at the festival. Both acts were to perform twice over the weekend, on the Zippo Encore and Jägermeister Acoustic stages. On 3 June, Andy Copping confirmed that Buckcherry would be pulling out of the festival and that they would be replaced by Black Star Riders.

Friday 14 June
| Main Stage | Zippo Encore Stage | Pepsi Max Stage | Red Bull Studios Stage | Jägermeister Acoustic Stage |
| Slipknot; Bullet for My Valentine; Korn; Down; Papa Roach; Asking Alexandria; Architects; Rise to Remain | Black Stone Cherry; Gogol Bordello; 3 Doors Down; Volbeat; Europe; DragonForce; Uriah Heep; Dir En Grey; Monster Truck | HIM; Converge; Motionless in White; Turisas; In This Moment; The Sword; Hang the Bastard; Patent Pending; Palm Reader; Emperor Chung | Fearless Vampire Killers; FIDLAR; The Algorithm; Zico Chain; Blood Command; Verses; Page 44; Zoax; Semperfi; Akord; Free Fall; Hammer of the Gods | We Are the Ocean; Walking Papers; Hear Kitty Kitty; Toseland; Rob Lynch; Avosetta |

Saturday 15 June
| Main Stage | Zippo Encore Stage | Pepsi Max Stage | Red Bull Studios Stage | Jägermeister Acoustic Stage |
| Iron Maiden; Queens of the Stone Age; Motörhead; Alice in Chains; Mastodon; Black Star Riders; Young Guns; UFO | Enter Shikari; Jimmy Eat World; Thunder; Lit; Karnivool; Katatonia; Escape the Fate; Hardcore Superstar; Heaven's Basement; I Divide | The Hives; Kvelertak; Chthonic; Uncle Acid & the Deadbeats; Bury Tomorrow; Heart of a Coward; Empress AD; Walking Papers; Nekrogoblikon earthtone9 Crowns; Hill Valley High; Broken | Last Witness; Rat Attack; Lonely the Brave; Voodoo Six; Press to Meco; Searching Alaska; Wounds; Sky Valley Mistress; Silent Screams; Black Moth; Astroid Boys; Idiom; Wild Lies; Cytota | Devin Townsend; Acoustic TV; Buffalo Summer; Crowns; Straight Lines; Fahran; The Killing Floor; The Afterparty |

Sunday 16 June
| Main Stage | Zippo Encore Stage | Pepsi Max Stage | Red Bull Studios Stage | Jägermeister Acoustic Stage |
| Rammstein; Thirty Seconds to Mars; The Gaslight Anthem; Stone Sour; Parkway Drive; Five Finger Death Punch; Coal Chamber; Cancer Bats; Sacred Mother Tongue | Limp Bizkit; A Day to Remember; Airbourne; Ghost; Rival Sons; Amon Amarth; Masters of Reality; Graveyard; The Ghost Inside; Hellyeah; Blitz Kids | Satyricon; Modestep; P.O.D; Newsted; Red Fang; Vision of Disorder; Bleed from Within; Hacktivist; Brutality Will Prevail; Little Caesar; Krokodil; States of Panic; Bovine | Sonic Boom Six; Glamour of the Kill; I Am I Falling with Style; Surrender the Coast; The Howling; Forever Can Wait; Radkey; Buffalo Summer; Huntress; Black Dogs; Mordecai; The First; Naked Flame | Heaven's Basement; Pig Iron; Crash Mansion; New Killer Shoes; I Am I Night By Night; The Graveltones; Arthemis |

== 2014 ==
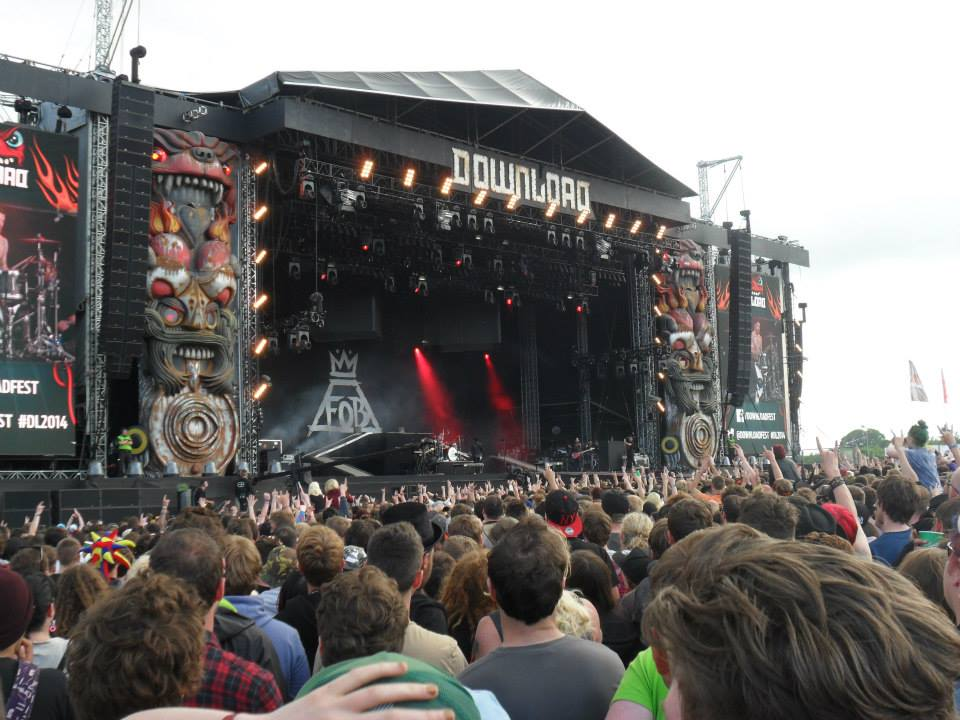
Fall Out Boy's set on the Stephen Sutton Main Stage on Saturday at Download Festival 2014

The twelfth annual festival was held 13–15 June 2014. Earlybird tickets went on sale 21 June 2013. Between 4–6 November, all three main stage headliners were confirmed, along with all the sub-headliners. Linkin Park performed their debut album, Hybrid Theory album in its entirety.

Reactions to Avenged Sevenfold being announced as headliners were very mixed. After a Facebook user suggested that Dying Fetus headline the festival instead, a social media trend titled #WhyNotDyingFetus was started as a joke. However, this actually led to the band being booked to play, although not in a headline slot, and they were officially confirmed on 6 November.

To commemorate its 20th anniversary, the Offspring performed their third studio album, Smash, in its entirety. Also, their appearance marked the first time in Download history that a previous main stage headliner returned to play a lower slot (though Limp Bizkit, who were originally scheduled to headline the festival in 2003 would return in 2009 to play a lower slot).

Andy Copping confirmed via Twitter that there would be a Secret Set on the Pepsi Max Stage on the Sunday, performing in the time slot in between Crazy Town and Memphis May Fire. This transpired to be Black Stone Cherry.

On 23 May, the Main stage was renamed the Stephen Sutton stage after Stephen Sutton who died on 14 May.

The Boardie Takeover returned on Thursday 12 June and featured four bands and 2 DJs. The bands playing the Takeover are: Last Edition, Scumface, Dumbjaw & Incinery.

Joe Bonamassa was originally booked to play on the Zippo Encore Stage Saturday before Status Quo but he was moved to the Sunday Main Stage due to a double booking. Trivium were initially confirmed to be headlining the Red Bull Studios Live stage on the Sunday, but following a generally negative response from fans due to the size and limited capacity of the tent, the band was moved to Zippo Encore Stage headliner.

In Flames were scheduled to sub-headline the Zippo Encore stage on Sunday, but they were quietly removed from the line-up poster on 26 February. It was later revealed that they had cancelled all of their Summer shows to finish recording their new album. On 22 March the latest announcement was leaked by Classic Rock Magazine. Shortly after the leak, Defeater, who were scheduled to play on the Pepsi Max Stage Sunday, were confirmed to have pulled out due to their lead singer, Derek Archambault, suffering an injury and having to undergo hip replacement surgery. Danger Danger were originally confirmed, but pulled out on 7 April, claiming that bookings had been erroneously made for various dates. September Mourning were confirmed for the Pepsi Max Stage on the Friday but were removed from the lineup on 2 May (as they wished to focus on getting their sophomore album completed), they were replaced by I Am Fire. Cage the Gods also pulled out on 2 May. King 810 pulled out the day before they were due to play because their lead vocalist and bassist were arrested. Upon a Burning Body were scheduled to appear on the Pepsi Max stage on Saturday, but were forced to pull out because singer Danny Leal was taken seriously ill with an inner ear infection that meant doctors would not clear him to fly to the UK.

The unknown band 'Iceman Thesis' were subtly added to the lineup poster in the buildup to the event. They were scheduled to perform for five minutes on both the Pepsi Max and Red Bull Studios Live Stage on the Saturday at the same time. The band performed both sets as scheduled with all ten (two bands of five) member's identities hidden using balaclavas. They performed one song known as 'Return to Harmony' before leaving the stages.

Friday 13 June
| The Stephen Sutton Main Stage | Zippo Encore Stage | Pepsi Max Stage | Red Bull Studios Live Stage | Jägermeister Acoustic Stage |
| Avenged Sevenfold; Rob Zombie; Within Temptation; Black Label Society; Skindred; Powerman 5000; Crossfaith; Miss May I | The Offspring; Bad Religion; Flogging Molly; Rival Sons; The Temperance Movement; The Answer; Drenge; Tesla; Tax the Heat | Opeth; Anathema; Letlive. Royal Blood; Quicksand; The Amity Affliction; Radkey; Turbowolf; I Am Fire; No Hot Ashes | Dan Reed Network; Tyketto; Battlecross; Baby Godzilla; Huntress; Lyger; Drones; Page 44; They Say Fall; Bloody Hammers; Bad Touch; Goldray | Jamie Lenman; The Answer; Danny Vaughn; New City Kings; The Mercy House; Mia Klose; Brother & Bones |

Saturday 14 June
| The Stephen Sutton Main Stage | Zippo Encore Stage | Pepsi Max Stage | Red Bull Studios Live Stage | Jägermeister Acoustic Stage |
| Linkin Park; Fall Out Boy; Bring Me the Horizon; Killswitch Engage; Bowling for Soup; While She Sleeps; Bury Tomorrow; Fozzy; Dying Fetus | Status Quo; Twisted Sister; The Wildhearts; Monster Magnet; Orange Goblin; Skid Row; Twenty One Pilots; The BossHoss; Chevelle; The Dirty Youth; Press to Meco | Behemoth; American Head Charge; The Black Dahlia Murder; Vamps; Blessthefall; Arcane Roots; Lonely the Brave; Marmozets; Lawnmower Deth; Zoax; Collibus; Iceman Thesis | SikTh; The Howling; Malevolence; Martyr Defiled; New Politics; Nothing More; Skyharbor coldrain Chasing Cadence; Sinners Highway; Colt 45; Breathe in the Silence; Cytota; Iceman Thesis | Ginger Wildheart; Bowling for Soup; Anathema; Toby Jepson; Dave McPherson; Richards/Crane; Ducking Punches; Enemo-J |

Sunday 15 June
| The Stephen Sutton Main Stage | Zippo Encore Stage | Pepsi Max Stage | Red Bull Studios Live Stage | Jägermeister Acoustic Stage |
| Aerosmith; Alter Bridge; Steel Panther; Volbeat; Joe Bonamassa; Richie Sambora; Buckcherry; Winger; Red Dragon Cartel | Trivium; The Pretty Reckless; Seether; Philip H. Anselmo & the Illegals; Sabaton; Sepultura; Emmure; We Came as Romans; Skillet; Kill Devil Hill; Avatar | The Dillinger Escape Plan; The Used; Suicide Silence; Against Me! Memphis May Fire; Black Stone Cherry; Crazy Town; The Treatment; Feed the Rhino; Thy Art Is Murder; The Graveltones; The Charm the Fury; Viza | Zebrahead; Monuments; Polar; Heart in Hand; Reignwolf; Adelphia; The Magnus Puto; Create to Inspire; Kid Karate; Chinese Missy; Life on Standby; Arthemis; Dead City Streets | Nick Oliveri; Jon Gomm; Oxygen Thief; Milk Teeth; VerseChorusVerse; Fizzy Blood; Stormbringer |

== 2015 ==
The 2015 edition of the festival took place on 12–14 June. The top three acts on the main stage and the second stage headliner for each day were announced over 18, 19 and 20 November. Bad weather on Friday night and Saturday left the Arena, Village and campsites extremely muddy. Many tents were abandoned over night due to flooding and leaks.

On 22 March 2015, the Download Dog made an appearance at a Progress Wrestling show in London. The Dog invited the entire roster to do a show at Download 2015 but excluded the current Progress Champion Jimmy Havoc. Havoc attacked the Dog at the show. It was confirmed that Progress would do a show at Download after previously in 2014 doing three shows at the Sonisphere Festival.

Following on from the Offspring's second stage appearance in 2014, Faith No More's subheadlining position marks the second time a previous main stage headliner have returned to play in a lower slot. Mötley Crüe's performance was their last ever UK festival appearance.

Several bands who pulled out of the 2014's festival returned to play in 2015, these bands include In Flames, Defeater, Upon a Burning Body & September Mourning.

The Sword were due to play on the Maverick Stage on Friday, but were removed from the line-up poster in March, later being confirmed to have pulled out. King 810 were due to play the Maverick Stage on Sunday, but pulled out on 15 May due to undisclosed reasons, just as they had done before in 2014. On 22 May, Ghost Town, who were confirmed to play on Jake's stage on Saturday, pulled out due to undisclosed reasons; they were replaced by Dub War. Antemasque were due to play on the Zippo Encore Stage on Friday, but pulled out in May, the Cadillac Three were moved up from Jake's Stage to replace them.

After many weeks of discussion surrounding the identities of two secret bands playing over the weekend, Young Guns and the Darkness were confirmed on 8 June. Babymetal also joined DragonForce on stage to perform their song "Gimme Chocolate!!".

The Jägermeister Acoustic Stage will no longer be present at the festival, due to Jägermeister pulling out as a sponsor, however, bands will still perform acoustic sets, on the brand new Dog's Bed Stage. Hands Like Houses were scheduled to perform there on Friday, but the show was cancelled.

Returning for its 7th year, the Boardie Takeover took place on the Thursday night in the Doghouse Tent located within the festivals Village area. This year's bands were selected by the Takeover team, Hevs and Phil

Friday 12 June
| Main Stage | Zippo Encore Stage | The Maverick Stage | Jake's Stage | Dog's Bed Stage |
| Slipknot; Judas Priest; Five Finger Death Punch; Clutch; Lacuna Coil; At the Gates; Hellyeah; All That Remains | Black Stone Cherry; Thunder; Corrosion of Conformity; Modestep; The Cadillac Three; Blues Pills; Fearless Vampire Killers; Rival State | Fightstar; DragonForce; Sylosis; Beartooth; Defeater; Gnarwolves; Krokodil; Counterparts | A Young Guns; Bombus; The One Hundred; Decade; American Fangs; Allusondrugs; Blood Youth; The Raven Age; Wild Lies; God Damn; E of E | Hands Like Houses; Beasts; Rival State |

Saturday 13 June
| Main Stage | Zippo Encore Stage | The Maverick Stage | Jake's Stage | Dog's Bed Stage |
| Muse; Faith No More; A Day to Remember; Rise Against; Parkway Drive; Hollywood Undead; Mallory Knox; Funeral for a Friend; Heart of a Coward | Marilyn Manson; Black Veil Brides; Black Star Riders; Motionless in White; Carcass; Testament; Ace Frehley; Apocalyptica; Malefice; Geyser; The Lounge Kittens | Andrew W.K. Body Count; Every Time I Die; Crown the Empire; Northlane; Upon a Burning Body; Stray from the Path; Hands Like Houses; Chunk! No, Captain Chunk! In Hearts Wake | Hey! Hello! The Pink Slips; Dolomite Minor; Insomnium; Purson; Dub War; The Struts; Roam; Creeper; Crobot; Emp!re; New Years Day; Love Zombies; Iconic Eye | Tim Vantol; Von Hertzen Brothers; Crobot |

Sunday 14 June
| Main Stage | Zippo Encore Stage | The Maverick Stage | Jake's Stage | Dog's Bed Stage |
| Kiss; Mötley Crüe; Slash Featuring Myles Kennedy & the Conspirators; Billy Idol; Blackberry Smoke; Tremonti; Cavalera Conspiracy; 36 Crazyfists; Pop Evil | Enter Shikari; Lamb of God; In Flames; L7; Eagles of Death Metal; Godsmack; We Are Harlot; Backyard Babies; Von Hertzen Brothers; H.E.A.T; The Dead Daisies | Yellowcard; The Ghost Inside; Madball; Three Days Grace; The Darkness; Code Orange; Evil Scarecrow; September Mourning; Like a Storm | Suicidal Tendencies; FIDLAR; Chelsea Grin; Butcher Babies; Aaron Keylock; Man with a Mission; The Qemists; René LaVice; Trash Boat; LTNT; Hyena; Colour of Noise; Beasts; Sirens in the Delta | Like a Storm; Broken Chords; Fearless Vampire Killers |

=== Police surveillance ===
At the 2015 festival, the police and the festival organisers engaged in massive technological surveillance of those who attended the festival. RFID wristband and facial recognition technology were used, installed by Leicestershire Police without notifying the public prior to the event, and compared visual scans of the festival attendees against a European criminal database. RFID wristbands were the only way to make purchases or travel across the festival grounds' zones. Information about purchases were stored and sold to other marketers. Muse frontman Matt Bellamy commented on the surveillance during the band's performance of "Uprising", in which he said "Fuck Leicestershire police for scanning your faces!"

== 2016 ==
=== Donington ===
The 14th annual Download Festival was held on 10–12 June 2016. All three headliners were confirmed between 19–21 October 2015 and it was confirmed that Bruce Dickinson was due to fly his Ed Force One 747-400 Jumbo Jet across Download to get to the festival. However, this didn't happen, and in fact Ed Force One flew into East Midlands airport from the opposite direction. Motörhead were due to play the Main Stage on the Friday of the festival; however, due to the death of lead singer Lemmy Kilmister on 28 December 2015, the band would no longer be playing, as confirmed by drummer Mikkey Dee. On 7 February 2016, 36 more bands were added to the bill, as well as the announcement that the Main Stage would be renamed "The Lemmy Stage" in memory of Kilmister, instead of having a band replace Motörhead, it was confirmed that there would be a tribute to Lemmy, which was confirmed at the fan forum to be a 20-minute video.

Heavy rain caused the venue to flood, with some campsites suffering worse than others. The Met Office later confirmed that it could have been the wettest in the festival's history. By Saturday, The Village area was mainly mud with a bit of straw laid down near the entrance to the Blue Campsite. This led to great difficulty trying to get to the main arena, as one had to walk through thick mud most of the way. Architects was scheduled to play on the Encore stage on 11 June but had dropped all of their European festival tours due to a family emergency and were replaced by Against the Current.

Both Moses and Ghost were also forced to pull out of their scheduled sets on Friday and Sunday respectively due to illness on both counts.

The Maverick stage on Friday was closed out by a screening of Gutterdämmerung, coupled with a live score; described as a "rock 'n' roll / film / gig concept from the mind of Belgian-Swedish visual artist Bjorn Tagemose".

Friday 10 June
| The Lemmy Stage | Zippo Encore Stage | The Maverick Stage | The Dogtooth Stage |
| Rammstein; Korn; Killswitch Engage; Babymetal; Alien Ant Farm; Royal Republic | All Time Low; Twin Atlantic; Glassjaw; The Amity Affliction; Skillet; Graveyard; As Lions; RavenEye | Gutterdämmerung; The Wildhearts; Kadavar; Fort Hope; Heck; Zoax; Puppy; Hill Valley High | Raging Speedhorn; InMe; Savage Messiah; Skinny Lister; From Ashes to New; Counting Days; Havok; Strange Bones; The Amorettes; Weirds; In Search of Sun |

Saturday 11 June
| The Lemmy Stage | Zippo Encore Stage | The Maverick Stage | The Dogtooth Stage |
| Black Sabbath; Deftones; Megadeth; Rival Sons; Sixx:A.M. Atreyu; Beartooth; Avatar | NOFX; Skindred; Against the Current; Juliette & the Licks; Bury Tomorrow; Tesseract; Scorpion Child; The Men That Will Not Be Blamed for Nothing; Inglorious; Santa Cruz | Pennywise; Neck Deep; Anti-Flag; Escape the Fate; Lawnmower Deth; Danko Jones; Turbowolf; Black Peaks; SHVPES | Municipal Waste; The Shrine; Cane Hill; Slaves; Dead! Milk Teeth; Wage War; Palisades; Reigning Days; Wearing Scars; Scattering Ashes |

Sunday 12 June
| The Lemmy Stage | Zippo Encore Stage | The Maverick Stage | The Dogtooth Stage |
| Iron Maiden; Nightwish; Disturbed; Shinedown; Halestorm; The Temperance Movement; Amon Amarth; Monster Truck | Jane's Addiction; Billy Talent; Don Broco; Breaking Benjamin; One Ok Rock; Periphery; Delain; Grand Magus; Whiskey Myers; Buck & Evans | Saxon; Gojira; Electric Wizard; Tremonti; Frank Carter and the Rattlesnakes; Attila; The Dirty Youth; The Raven Age; Wild Lies | Napalm Death; Ho99o9; Good Tiger; Ashestoangels; Black Foxxes; The Kenneths; Muncie Girls; The King Is Blind; Witchsorrow; Vukovi; The Franklys |

As confirmed by The Mirror, NXT also appeared at this years event, although where Progress Wrestling was after the bands in the campsite, WWE NXT was in the main arena, with a special stage constructed. During the event, the companies' COO and founder of NXT Triple H was awarded by Dave Mustaine the Spirit of Lemmy Award due to their friendship and working relationship.

=== France ===
In addition to the annual UK edition of Download Festival, it was also announced that in 2016 there would also be a Download held at the Longchamp Racecourse (French: Hippodrome de Longchamp) in Paris on the same weekend as the UK Festival. The lineup will be similar to the UK Festival, but not identical. Iron Maiden were announced as the Friday headliner on 19 October 2015, part of their The Book Of Souls Tour. Rammstein were announced as Sunday headliners on 21 October 2015.

Stage 1
| Friday 10 June | Saturday 11 June | Sunday 12 June |
| Iron Maiden; Deftones; Gojira; We Came as Romans | Korn; Biffy Clyro; Babymetal; Saxon; Apocalyptica | Rammstein; Volbeat; Sabaton; Trivium; Skillet |

Stage 2
| Friday 10 June | Saturday 11 June | Sunday 12 June |
| Ghost; Anthrax; Avatar; Beartooth | Jane's Addiction; Amon Amarth; One Ok Rock; Mass Hysteria | Megadeth; Rival Sons; Children of Bodom; Lofofora |

Stage 3
| Friday 10 June | Saturday 11 June | Sunday 12 June |
| Tremonti; BlackRain; The Raven Age; Wild Lies | Twin Atlantic; The Struts; The Inspector Cluzo; Arcane Roots; Shinedown | Skindred; Last Train; New Years Day; Strange Bones; The Shrine |

== 2017 ==
The 15th annual event took place on 9–11 June 2017. From 3 November 2016, band announcements began, including the headline acts in System of a Down, Biffy Clyro and Aerosmith.

=== Donington ===
Friday 9 June
| Main Stage | Zippo Encore Stage | The Avalanche Stage | The Dogtooth Stage |
| System of a Down; Prophets of Rage; Five Finger Death Punch; Mastodon; Sabaton; Motionless in White; Northlane | Sum 41; Good Charlotte; Baroness; Suicidal Tendencies; Machine Gun Kelly; The Raven Age; Blackwater Conspiracy | Sleeping with Sirens; State Champs; Four Year Strong; Issues; Code Orange; The Devil Wears Prada; Astroid Boys; M O S E S | Exodus; The Contortionist; Krokodil; Lost Society; Venom Prison; God Damn; Red Sun Rising; Yonaka; Otherkin; Holding Absence; She Must Burn |

Saturday 10 June
| Main Stage | Zippo Encore Stage | The Avalanche Stage | The Dogtooth Stage |
| Biffy Clyro; A Day to Remember; AFI; Pierce the Veil; Of Mice & Men; Sikth; Creeper; Hacktivist | Rob Zombie; The Devin Townsend Project; Coheed and Cambria; Max and Igor Cavalera Return to Roots; Kvelertak; Suicide Silence; Alestorm; RavenEye; Tax the Heat | Simple Plan; The Story So Far; Every Time I Die; Crown the Empire; Knuckle Puck; As It Is; The One Hundred; Trash Boat; Greywind; Normandie | Wednesday 13; The Lounge Kittens; I the Mighty; Sick Puppies; Casey; The LaFontaines; IDLES; Junior; BlackWaters; Drones; Dead Label |

Sunday 11 June
| Main Stage | Zippo Encore Stage | The Avalanche Stage | The Dogtooth Stage |
| Aerosmith; Alter Bridge; Steel Panther; Airbourne; In Flames; The Cadillac Three; Orange Goblin; Fozzy | Slayer; Opeth; Clutch; Ministry; Anathema; DevilDriver; Red Fang; The Dead Daisies; Tyler Bryant & the Shakedown; Broken Witt Rebels | The Dillinger Escape Plan; Moose Blood; Basement; The King Blues; Touché Amoré; Dinosaur Pile-Up; Dead! Blood Youth; Grove Street Families; Wallflower | Perturbator; Like a Storm; Aaron Buchanan & The Cult Classics; Devilskin; Love Zombies; Fizzy Blood; The Charm the Fury; Stone Broken; Brutai; Fallen State |

=== France ===
Returning for its second year, Download Festival France takes place just south of Paris the same weekend as the Donington event. So far five bands have been announced including headliners System Of A Down, Linkin Park, and Green Day the lineup reads as follows:

Friday 9 June
| Main Stage | Main Stage 2 | Warbird Stage | Spitfire Stage |
| Linkin Park; Blink 182; Pierce the Veil; Kvelertak | Gojira; Dinosaur Jr. Raveneye; Mallory Knox | Hatebreed; Skinny Puppy; Dagoba; Dead! | Nostromo; Mars Red Sky; The Charm the Fury; The Cadillac Three |

Saturday 10 June
| Main Stage | Main Stage 2 | Warbird Stage | Spitfire Stage |
| System Of A Down; Five Finger Death Punch; Epica; Alter Bridge; Far From Alaska | Slayer; Paradise Lost; Blues Pills; DevilDriver; Black Foxxes | Caliban; Soilwork; Touché Amoré; Code Orange; Lonely the Brave | Sólstafir; The Living End; Aqme; Project Black Pantera |

Sunday 11 June
| Main Stage | Main Stage 2 | Warbird Stage | Spitfire Stage |
| Green Day; Rancid; Suicidal Tendencies; Leogun | Prophets of Rage; Mastodon; Architects; Suicide Silence; Rise of the Northstar; Tesseract | Carpenter Brut; Kontrust; Coheed and Cambria; Stray from the Path; Red Sun Rising | Crown the Empire; Northlane; Lost Society; Creeper; Astroid Boys |

=== Spain ===
Download Festival Madrid is a brand new member of the rock and metal festival family, taking place in the Spanish capital. After hosting a Parisian edition of the festival for the first time last year, the iconic festival spreads its reach even further in 2017, establishing a new outpost in Madrid.

Thursday 22 June
| Main Stage 1 | Main Stage 2 | Stage 3 | Stage 4 |
| Linkin Park; Five Finger Death Punch; A Day to Remember; Code Orange | Gojira; Monster Magnet; House of Pain; Hacktivist | Dark Tranquillity; Motionless in White; Touché Amoré; The Charm the Fury; RavenEye; Kaothic | Jardin de la Croix; Black Peaks; Porco Bravo; Lizzies; Inmune; Virgen |

Friday 23 June
| Main Stage 1 | Main Stage 2 | Stage 3 | Stage 4 |
| System of a Down; Cult; Hamlet; Myrath; Bat Sabbath | Mastodon; Opeth; Zebrahead; Skindred | Brujeria; Every Time I Die; Zeke; Triggerfinger; We Ride | Dawn of the Maya; Somas Cure; Against the Waves; Late to Scream |

Friday 23 June
| Main Stage 1 | Main Stage 2 | Stage 3 | Stage 4 |
| Prophets of Rage; In Flames; Iced Earth; Cobra | NOFX; Ministry; Kvelertak; Sólstafir | Suicidal Tendencies; Apocalyptica; Avatar; Deafheaven; Phil Campbell; And the Bastard Sons; God Damn; We Ride | Wormed; Arcane Roots; Blaze Out; Trono de Sangre; Syberia; Childrain |

== 2018 ==
The 2018 event has been confirmed for the weekend of 8, 9 & 10 June 2018. On 6 November Ozzy Osbourne was announced as the first headliner, with Avenged Sevenfold and Guns N' Roses being announced on 8 and 10 November.

=== Donington ===
Friday 8 June
| Main Stage | Zippo Encore Stage | The Avalanche Stage | The Dogtooth Stage |
| Avenged Sevenfold; Bullet for My Valentine; Volbeat; Marmozets; DragonForce; Avatar; Boston Manor | You Me at Six; Hell Is For Heroes; Jonathan Davis; Andrew W.K. CKY; Nothing More; Miss May I Culture Abuse | Bad Religion; The Bronx; Cancer Bats; Stick To Your Guns; Stray from the Path; Ded; Employed to Serve; Woes | Tesseract; Napalm Death; Emmure; Igorrr; Blessthefall; Loathe; Savage Messiah; Gold Key; Kaiser Franz Josef; Helpless; Cellar Darling |

Saturday 9 June
| Main Stage | Zippo Encore Stage | The Avalanche Stage | The Dogtooth Stage |
| Guns N' Roses; Black Stone Cherry; Thunder; The Temperance Movement; The Struts; Monster Truck; Whiskey Myers; The Pink Slips | Parkway Drive; Babymetal; Asking Alexandria; L7; Bury Tomorrow; Corrosion Of Conformity; Lawnmower Deth; Von Hertzen Brothers; Powerflo | Neck Deep; Mayday Parade; The Maine; Being As An Ocean; The Fever 333; Rolo Tomassi; The Faim; WSTR; TIGRESS; The Bottom Line | Thy Art Is Murder; Plini; Knocked Loose; Malevolence; Massive Wagons; SHVPES; Sleep Token; Higher Power; Anchor Lane; Death Blooms |

Sunday 10 June
| Main Stage | Zippo Encore Stage | The Avalanche Stage | The Dogtooth Stage |
| Ozzy Osbourne; Marilyn Manson; Shinedown; Black Veil Brides; In This Moment; Hatebreed; Cradle Of Filth; Inglorious | Rise Against; Alexisonfire; Meshuggah; Thrice; Body Count; Kreator; Dead Cross; Turbonegro; Greta Van Fleet; Starcrawler | The Hives; Less Than Jake; A Jamie Lenman; Black Foxxes; Milk Teeth; Bad Cop/Bad Cop; Puppy; Ecca Vandal; Dream State | Baroness; Zeal & Ardor; Myrkur; All Them Witches; Wayward Sons; Myke Gray; No Hot Ashes; The Hyena Kill; Sun Arcana; Koyo |

=== Australia ===
It has been confirmed that Live Nation, Unified and Secret Sounds will take the UK-founded rock festival to Melbourne's Flemington Racecourse on Saturday 24 March 2018. This will be a one-day event and the line-up is to be announced on Thursday 9 November. There were talks for the "Black Stage" to be headlined by Linkin Park, but the deal was never finalised due to the death of Chester Bennington.

Saturday 24 March
| Black Stage | Red Stage | Avalanche Stage | Dogtooth Stage |
| Korn; Limp Bizkit; Mastodon; Gojira; Of Mice & Men; King Parrot | Prophets of Rage; Good Charlotte; Amon Amarth; Sabaton; Northlane; Ocean Grove; High Tension | NOFX; Hot Water Music; Suicidal Tendencies; The Story So Far; Neck Deep; Trophy Eyes; Bad Cop/Bad Cop; Clowns | Arch Enemy; Nails; Falling In Reverse; Issues; Make Them Suffer; Psycroptic; Chase Atlantic; Cast Down |

=== France ===
Returning for its third year, Download Festival France takes place in Brétigny-sur-Orge just south of Paris the weekend after the Donington event (15th, 16, 17 & 18 June). Headliners were Ozzy Osbourne, Marilyn Manson, Guns N' Roses & Foo Fighters. Originally, Black Veil Brides was supposed to play on 15 June but pulled out the festival to join the Vans Warped Tour back in America.

Friday 15 June
| Main Stage | Main Stage 2 | Spitfire Stage | Warbird Stage | Firefly Stage |
| Ozzy Osbourne; Opeth; Powerwolf; Billy Talent | Ghost; Alestorm; Eluveitie; Wakan Tanka | Vandenberg's Moonkings; Sidilarsen; Pogo Car Crash Control; Cellar Darling | Converge; Underoath; Thy Art Is Murder; Bury Tomorrow | Peter Alexander Band Plays Tribute To Lynyrd Skynyrd; Hangman's Chair; Laura Cox Band; Merge |

Saturday 16 June
| Main Stage | Main Stage 2 | Spitfire Stage | Warbird Stage | Firefly Stage |
| Marilyn Manson; Avatar; Hollywood Undead; Turbonegro; Crossfaith | The Offspring; NOFX; Betraying the Martyrs; Alcest; Wild Mighty Freaks | Treponem Pal; Mantar; Nothing More; Skinny Lister; Ded | Meshuggah; Ultra Vomit; Thrice; Tagada Jones; Whiskey Myers | Galactic Empire; Cemican; Bad Cop Bad Cop; Jean Jean |

Sunday 17 June
| Main Stage | Main Stage 2 | Spitfire Stage | Warbird Stage | Firefly Stage |
| Foo Fighters; The Hives; Frank Carter and the Rattlesnakes; Wolf Alice; The Noface | Mass Hysteria; Dead Cross; Royal Republic; The Struts; Teacup Monster | Ego Kill Talent; Landmvrks; Arcane Roots; The Last Internationale | Perturbator; Slaves; Graveyard; Starcrawler | In Search Of Sun; Nesseria; Stone Broken; Kaiser Franz Joseph |

Monday 18 June
| Main Stage | Warbird Stage | Firefly Stage |
| Guns N' Roses; Volbeat; Jonathan Davis; Baroness | Seether; Greta Van Fleet; The Pink Slips; The G | Jared James Nichols; Grit |

=== Spain ===
Returning for its second year, Download Festival Spain takes place just south of Madrid three weekends after the Donington event (28, 29 & 30 June).

| Main Stage | Main Stage 2 | Stage 3 | Stage 4 |
|---|---|---|---|
| Avenged Sevenfold; Marilyn Manson; Arch Enemy; Tesseract | A Perfect Circle; Rise Against; Kreator; Backyard Babies | Pennywise; Myrkur; Iron Reagan; Foscor; Kaiser Franz Josef | Galactic Empire; Hummano; Exhorder; Altair; Catorce; Aphonnic |

Friday 29 June
| Main Stage | Main Stage 2 | Stage 3 | Stage 4 |
| Guns N' Roses; Bullet for My Valentine; Creeper | Parkway Drive; Clutch; Thrice | Viva Belgrado; Underoath; Ankor; Leather Heart | Moose Blood; The Pink Slips |

Sunday 16 June
| Main Stage | Main Stage 2 | Stage 3 | Stage 4 |
| Ozzy Osbourne; Volbeat; Baroness | Judas Priest; The Hellacopters; Shinedown; L7 | Carcass; Madball; In This Moment; Crim; Ego Kill Talent; Meltdown | 77; Adrift; Crisix; Crossfaith; Teething; Eon |

== 2019 ==
=== Donington ===
The 2019 event took place during 14–16 June. The first 20 bands, including all three main stage headliners, were announced at 2 pm on 23 October 2018. More bands were announced on 27 January 2019. In terms of genres, 44 artists represented rock (out of 117), while 41 bands played metal music.

Now three-time headliner Def Leppard played their seminal album Hysteria in full as part of their set.

Some people left the festival before any of the bands had even started playing due to heavy rain turning the site into a "mud-bath". Several festival goers injured themselves due to falling over because of the conditions.

Friday 14 June
| Main Stage | Zippo Encore Stage | The Avalanche Stage | The Dogtooth Stage |
| Def Leppard; Slash Featuring Myles Kennedy & the Conspirators; Whitesnake; Clutch; Blackberry Smoke; Tesla; Last in Line | Rob Zombie; Eagles of Death Metal; Opeth; Deadland Ritual; Delain; Kvelertak; Skid Row; Goodbye June | Me First and the Gimme Gimmes; Reel Big Fish; The Interrupters; Zebrahead; Man with a Mission; Icon for Hire; Sumo Cyco; PENGSHUi | At the Gates; Ne Obliviscaris; Jinjer; Twelve Foot Ninja; Vega; Lost Society; Skynd; Conjurer; Nova Twins; Those Damn Crows; GroundCulture |

Saturday 15 June
| Main Stage | Zippo Encore Stage | The Avalanche Stage | The Dogtooth Stage |
| Slipknot; Die Antwoord; Trivium; Skindred; Behemoth; Power Trip; Royal Republic; Alien Weaponry | Halestorm; Stone Temple Pilots; Three Days Grace; Brothers Osborne; Epica; Animals as Leaders; Elvana; Bad Wolves; The Inspector Cluzo | Simple Creatures; The Wonder Years; Nothing,Nowhere; Trash Boat; ROAM; Palisades; The Beaches; Hot Milk; Yours Truly; Parting Gift | Carcass; Batushka; Intervals; The Hu; Riding the Low; Lovebites; Queen Zee; Underside; Cloud; Vambo |

Sunday 16 June
| Main Stage | Zippo Encore Stage | The Avalanche Stage | The Dogtooth Stage |
| Tool; Smashing Pumpkins; Lamb of God; Amon Amarth; Godsmack; Underoath; I Prevail; Cane Hill | Slayer; Dream Theater; Anthrax; Beartooth; State Champs; Starset; Badflower; Dinosaur Pile-Up; Like a Storm | Enter Shikari; Fever 333; Palaye Royale; The Amity Affliction; Our Last Night; Black Peaks; Heart of a Coward; Allusinlove; Black Futures; RedHook | Municipal Waste; Whitechapel; Coldrain; Alcest; Toska; Crystal Lake; Kim Jennett; Aaron Buchanan & The Cult Classics; Blurred Vision; Wolf Jaw; Lost in Stereo |

=== Australia ===
The 2019 event was held in Sydney on 9 March and in Melbourne on 11 March. Ozzy Osbourne was announced as the headliner of the festival, but cancelled due to his illness, pneumonia.

Saturday 9 March
| Black Stage | Red Stage | Avalanche Stage | Dogtooth Stage | Ascension Stage |
| Judas Priest; Rise Against; Anthrax; Airbourne; Luca Brasi; Alien Weaponry | Slayer; Alice in Chains; The Amity Affliction; Behemoth; I Prevail; Polaris; Voyager | Ghost; Pennywise; Thy Art Is Murder; Me First and the Gimme Gimmes; Code Orange; The Fever 333; War on Women; New Years Day | Sum 41; Halestorm; Twelve Foot Ninja; Converge; Frenzal Rhomb; High Tension; Slaves; Ruins | Justice for the Damned; Devilskin; Outright; Eat Your Heart Out; Aversions Crown; The Beautiful Monument; RedHook |

Monday 11 March
| Black Stage | Red Stage | Avalanche Stage | Dogtooth Stage | Ascension Stage |
| Judas Priest; Rise Against; Anthrax; Luca Brasi; Airbourne | Slayer; Alice in Chains; The Amity Affliction; Behemoth; I Prevail; Voyager | Ghost; Sum 41; Pennywise; Code Orange; Me First and the Gimme Gimmes; The Fever 333; Slaves; New Years Day | Halestorm; Twelve Foot Ninja; Thy Art Is Murder; Polaris; Frenzal Rhomb; Converge; High Tension; War on Women; Ruins | Justice for the Damned; Devilskin; Outright; Alien Weaponry; Aversions Crown; Eat Your Heart Out; The Beautiful Monument; Windwaker |

=== Japan ===
The Live Nation and Creativeman Productions took place at the UK-founded rock festival to Makuhari Messe, located in Chiba, on Thursday, 21 March 2019. This was a one-day event. Ozzy Osbourne was announced as the headliner of the festival, but cancelled due to his illness, pneumonia.

Thursday 21 March 2019
| Blood Stage | Tears Stage |
| Judas Priest; Sum 41; Anthrax; Halestorm; Amaranthe | Slayer; Ghost; Arch Enemy; Man with a Mission; Like a Storm |

=== Spain ===
Friday 28 June
| Main Stage 1 | Main Stage 2 | Stage 3 | Stage 4 |
| Scorpions; Papa Roach; Vita Imana | Sabaton; Children of Bodom; Turbonegro; Comeback Kid | Mantar; Liily; The Wizards; Le Temps Du Loup; Rolo Tomassi | Me First and the Gimme Gimmes; Turnstile; Brutus; Cannibal Grandpa; Hiranya; Holy Cuervo DJ'S |

Saturday 29 June
| Main Stage 1 | Main Stage 2 | Stage 3 | Stage 4 |
| Slipknot; Amon Amarth; Red Fang; Perturbator | Stone Temple Pilots; Berri Txarrak; Rival Sons; Kontrust | Enter Shikari; Leprous; Will Haven; Ànteros; Graveyard | The Baboon Show; Megara; Lovebites; El Altar del Holocausto; Walking with Wolves; Back to the 90's DJ'S |

Sunday 30 June
| Main Stage 1 | Main Stage 2 | Stage 3 | Stage 4 |
| Tool; Architects; Toundra; Amon Amarth; Fiend | Sum 41; Soulfly; Brass Against; Boston Manor | Watain; State Champs; Fever 333; Bones of Minerva | The Interrupters; As It Is; Bala; Nothing,Nowhere |

== 2020 (cancelled) ==
The 2020 Download events were due to be held in the UK, Australia and Japan. They were all cancelled due to the COVID-19 pandemic. A return of the Paris edition was also planned but was cancelled in September 2019 due to construction work on the festival site by French transportation company SNCF.

The 2020 event at Donington was scheduled to take place during 12–14 June. The initial lineup was announced on 23 September 2019, with Kiss, Iron Maiden and System of a Down to headline. On 26 March 2020, due to the COVID-19 pandemic in the United Kingdom, it was announced that the 2020 event had been cancelled.

The 2020 festival was replaced by Download TV, a 3 day virtual festival showing old performances, unseen interviews, new performances and more. The online festival started on the same day the festival was due to take place.

The 2020 event in Australia was scheduled to take place in Melbourne on 20 March and in Sydney on 21 March. However, due to headliners My Chemical Romance withdrawing from the festival due to fears regarding the pandemic, and the organisers unable to secure a replacement headline act in such a short time, Download Australia 2020 was cancelled. The other headliners were to be Deftones and Jimmy Eat World.

The 2020 event in Japan was scheduled to take place in Chiba City on 29 March, headlined by My Chemical Romance.

== 2021 (Download Pilot) ==
For 2021, only a UK Download event was scheduled to take place from 4 to 6 June. The dates for the 2021 Download event in the UK were announced on 3 June 2020. The announcement revealed that two headliners, KISS and System of a Down, as well as many other acts, would be returning to the festival after its cancellation in 2020. As was the case with the previous year, the 2021 event was cancelled on 1 March 2021, due to the COVID-19 pandemic in the United Kingdom.

The 2021 event was replaced with another virtual event similar to 2020. It was announced on 14 May 2021 that there would be two special programmes on Sky Arts on 5 and 6 June featuring the best headliners from the past 10 years of Download.

As part of the second phase of the UK Government's Event Research Programme, a pilot testing event of Download Festival 2021 was announced on 26 May 2021 called Download Festival Pilot. The event was held from 18 to 20 June with an all-British lineup headlined by Frank Carter & the Rattlesnakes, Enter Shikari and Bullet For My Valentine. The main stage on the Sunday experienced a few sound issues, notable during Loathe's set which saw them lose their sound during the final song of their set, and The Wildhearts who ended their set early and left the stage.

Friday 18 June
| Main Stage | Second Stage |
| Frank Carter & the Rattlesnakes; Neck Deep; Boston Manor; Hot Milk | Sleep Token; Holding Absence; Malevolence; Death Blooms |

Saturday 19 June
| Main Stage | Second Stage |
| Enter Shikari; While She Sleeps; Twin Atlantic; Yonaka; A Wargasm; Bleed From Within; Conjurer | Creeper; Stone Broken; Those Damn Crows; Vukovi; Tigercub; The Hara; As Everything Unfolds; Lotus Eater |

Sunday 20 June
| Main Stage | Second Stage |
| Bullet For My Valentine; Skindred; The Wildhearts; Elvana; Lonely the Brave; Loathe; Employed to Serve; Saint Agnes | Frank Turner & the Sleeping Souls; Trash Boat; Massive Wagons; Jamie Lenman; Higher Power; Chubby and the Gang; Cassyette; Static Dress |

== 2022 ==
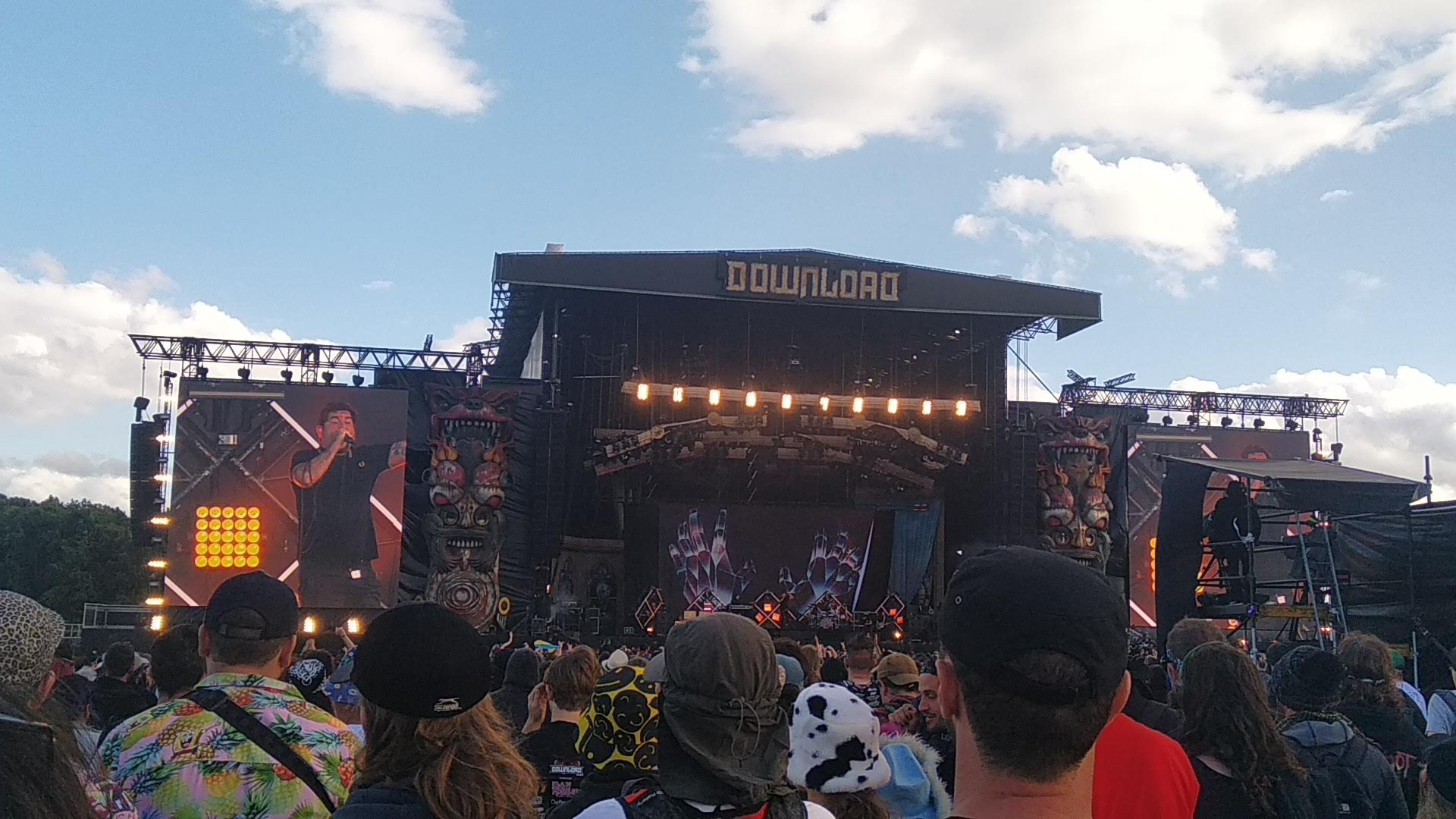
Deftones at Download Festival 2022

The 2022 UK Download event took place from 10 to 12 June.

=== Donington ===
The dates for the 2022 Download event in the UK were announced on 1 March 2021, with Kiss, Iron Maiden and Biffy Clyro set to headline. Wednesday 13 pulled out a few weeks before due to bicep surgery.

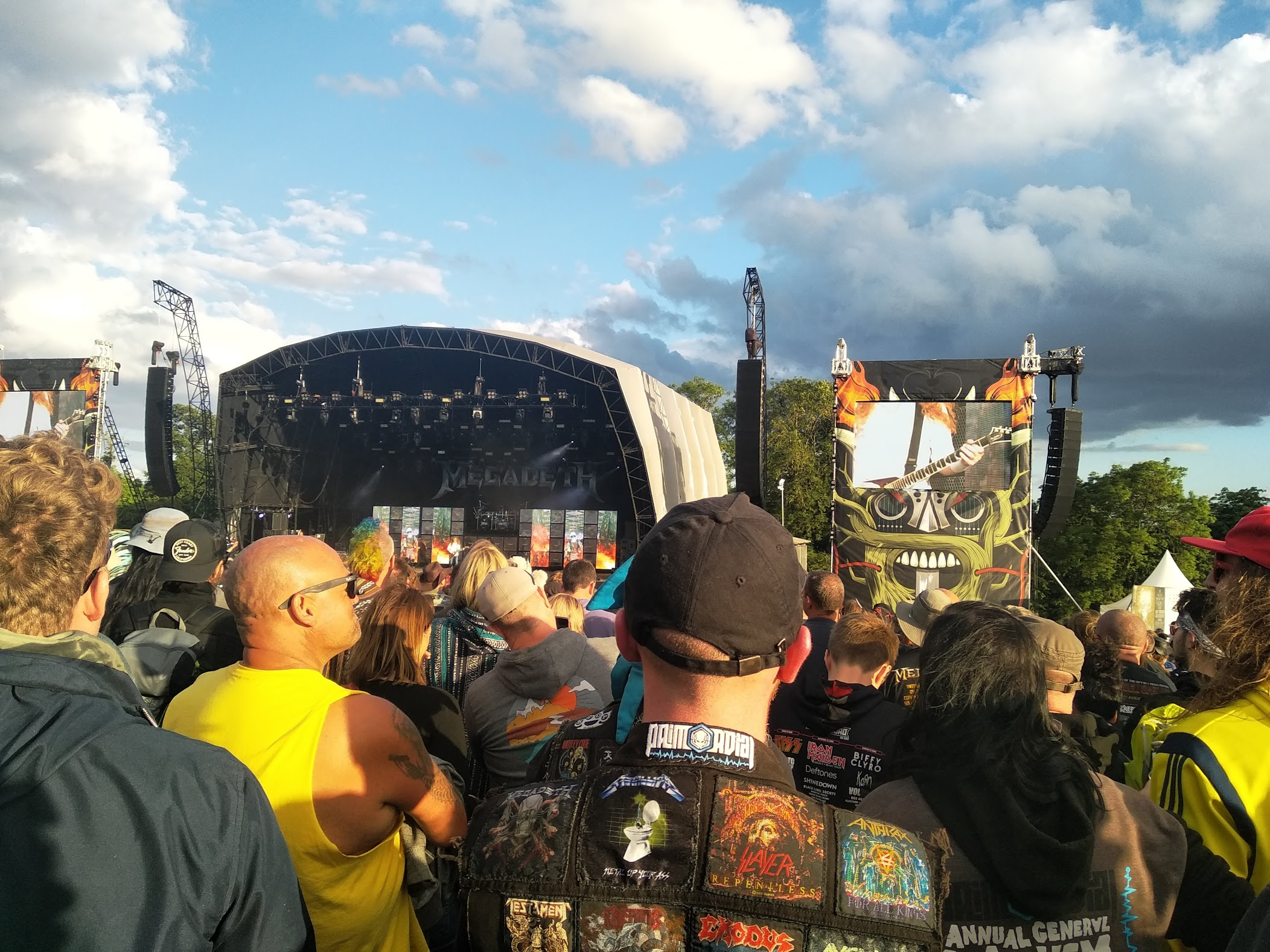
Megadeth at Download Festival 2022

On Saturday 11 June, East Midlands Airport was forced to close its runway for a short time due to drones being in the vicinity, which were reported by Leicestershire Police and the Festival as being flown by guests at the festival.

Friday 10 June
| Apex Stage | Opus Stage | The Avalanche Stage | The Dogtooth Stage |
| Kiss; A Day to Remember; Skindred; Black Veil Brides; Bury Tomorrow; Theory; Wayward Sons | Frank Carter and the Rattlesnakes; Airbourne; Lacuna Coil; Myles Kennedy & Company; Skynd; Kris Barras Band; Ayron Jones | The Ghost Inside; Sleep Token; Normandie; Meet Me @ The Altar; Kid Brunswick; As Everything Unfolds; PENGSHUi; Press Club | Electric Wizard; Blues Pills; Red Fang; British Lion; Bokassa; Tempt; A.A. Williams; Dead Poet Society; Cellar Door Moon Crow; The Scratch; Heriot |

Saturday 11 June
| Apex Stage | Opus Stage | The Avalanche Stage | The Dogtooth Stage |
| Iron Maiden; Deftones; Shinedown; Black Label Society; Monster Truck; Those Damn Crows; The Raven Age | Megadeth; Mastodon; Daughtry; Bush; Ice Nine Kills; Malevolence; Cassyette; Dirty Honey | Funeral for a Friend; Creeper; The Faim grandson Holding Absence; Loathe; Dragged Under; Salem; Blackout Problems; Aniimalia | Sepultura; Napalm Death; Dying Fetus; Bleed from Within; Venom Prison; Will Haven; Higher Power; Dana Dentata; Banks Arcade; Dead Label; Death Blooms; Temples on Mars |

Sunday 12 June
| Apex Stage | Opus Stage | The Avalanche Stage | The Dogtooth Stage |
| Biffy Clyro; Korn; Volbeat; Rise Against; Alestorm; Powerwolf; Wargasm | Steel Panther; The Darkness; Skillet; Baroness; Tremonti; Wednesday 13; Massive Wagons; The Last Internationale; Control the Storm | Descendents; Boston Manor; Trash Boat; Spiritbox; Marianas Trench; Jamie Lenman; The Hara; Cemetery Sun; Dead Posey; Static Dress | Myles Kennedy; Yonaka; Twin Temple; Fire from the Gods; Orbit Culture; Kill the Lights; Modern Error; Phoxjaw; Bimini; Anchor Lane; The Velveteers; The Injester |

=== Germany ===
Friday 24 June

Metallica
Five Finger Death Punch
Sabaton
Enter Shikari
Behemoth
Frank Carter and the Rattlesnakes
Poorstacy
Ghostkid
Holding Absence

=== Japan ===
Sunday 14 August

Dream Theater
Bullet for My Valentine
Mastodon
Steel Panther
Soulfly
At the Gates
Code Orange
The Halo Effect
Band-Maid

== 2023 ==
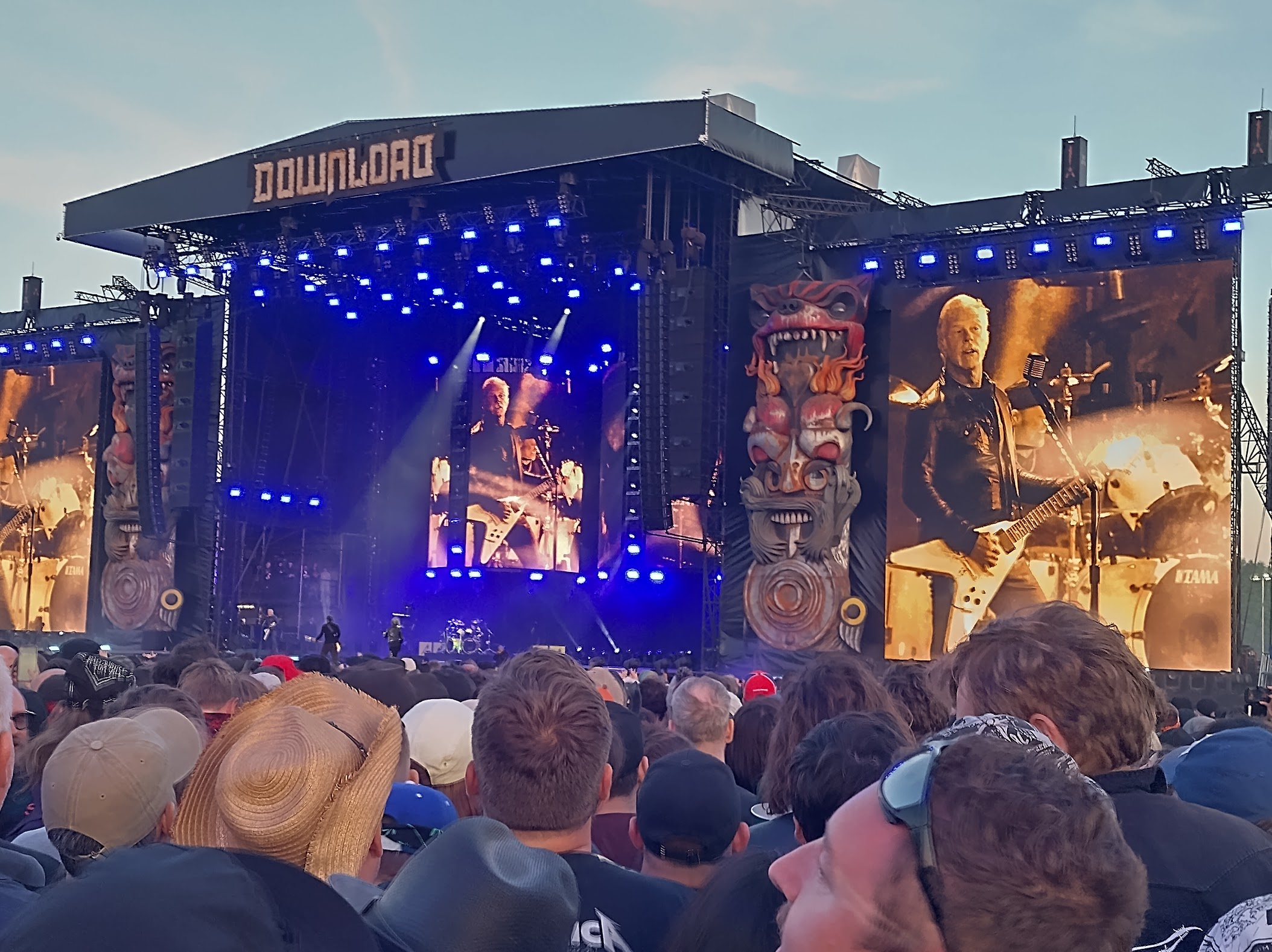
Metallica at Download Festival 2023

The 2023 event took place from Thursday 8 June to Sunday 11 June. As a celebration for the twentieth anniversary of the festival, a four night event was announced.

On 7 November, over 60 artists were announced to perform at the festival; including headliners Bring Me the Horizon, Slipknot and two unique sets from Metallica. Five Finger Death Punch were originally scheduled to headline the Opus Stage on the Thursday but had do withdraw due to an illness of lead vocalist Ivan Moody. On 26 May, Skindred were announced as a replacement.

Greg Puciato was scheduled to perform on the Saturday but on Friday 9 June he announced his decision to pull out due to "multiple inner circle emergencies". nothing,nowhere., also scheduled to perform on the Saturday, also pulled out of the festival line-up for undisclosed reasons.

On 14 June 2023, Derbyshire Live reported on the experience of disabled festival goers who highlighted overflowing toilets, camping on gravel, staff unaware of basic information and "appalling" transport for disabled people.

Thursday 8 June
| Apex Stage | Opus Stage | Avalanche Stage | Dogtooth Stage |
| Metallica; Alter Bridge; Halestorm; Jinjer; Mammoth WVH | Skindred; Puscifer; Hundred Reasons; The Bronx; Cancer Bats; Cherry Bombs | State Champs; Mom Jeans; Punk Rock Factory; Fearless Vampire Killers; Tigress | Perturbator; Haken; A.A. Williams; Caskets; Mimi Barks; Snayx |

Friday 9 June
| Apex Stage | Opus Stage | Avalanche Stage | Dogtooth Stage |
| Bring Me the Horizon; Architects; Pendulum; Neck Deep; Hot Milk; Nova Twins; Stand Atlantic | Evanescence; Within Temptation; Asking Alexandria; Epica; Elvana; Smash into Pieces; The Warning | VV; PUP; The Blackout; Crawlers; Demob Happy; AViVA; As December Falls; RedHook; Fixation | Carpenter Brut; Empire State Bastard; Brutus; Ingested; Undeath; Pupil Slicer; Witch Fever; Taipei Houston |

Saturday 10 June
| Apex Stage | Opus Stage | Avalanche Stage | Dogtooth Stage |
| Metallica; Disturbed; Alexisonfire; Clutch; Ice Nine Kills; Fever 333; Polaris | Placebo; Simple Plan; Three Days Grace; Motionless in White; Carcass; Municipal Waste; Stray from the Path; Static Dress | Coheed and Cambria; Deaf Havana; Bob Vylan; Kid Kapichi; Casey; Blackgold; Rituals | Creeper; Monuments; Gwar; Spirit Adrift; Enola Gay; Bambie Thug; Beauty School Dropout; Lake Malice; Kid Bookie; Antisaint |

Sunday 11 June
| Apex Stage | Opus Stage | Avalanche Stage | Dogtooth Stage |
| Slipknot; Parkway Drive; I Prevail; Behemoth; The Hu; Lorna Shore; Bloodywood | Ghost; Bad Religion; Palaye Royale; Dinosaur Pile-Up; Avatar; The Amity Affliction; SiM; Blind Channel | Electric Callboy; Set it Off; Mod Sun; Cleopatrick; Jazmin Bean; Joey Valence & Brae; Taylor Acorn; Crashface | Hatebreed; Touché Amoré; Terror; Soen; Green Lung; SOUL GLO; The Meffs; Hawxx; Graphic Nature; Beauty School |

== 2024 ==
Billed as Download XXI, the twenty first iteration of the Donington-based festival took place between 14 and 16 June 2024. It returned to the three-day festival format that began in 2005.

The first wave of acts, including headliners Queens of the Stone Age, Fall Out Boy and Avenged Sevenfold were announced on 7 November.

Friday 14 June
| Apex Stage | Opus Stage | Avalanche Stage | Dogtooth Stage |
| Queens of the Stone Age; Royal Blood; Black Stone Cherry; Polyphia; The Struts; Those Damn Crows; The Blue Stones | Funeral for a Friend; Heilung; Mr. Bungle; Soft Play; All Them Witches; Scene Queen; Halocene; Hanabie. | Busted; Wheatus; Bayside; Vukovi; Escape the Fate; Dream State; AViVA; TX2; STORM | Biohazard; HEALTH; Make Them Suffer; The Callous Daoboys; Urne; Frozemode; Defects |

Saturday 15 June
| Main Stage | Opus Stage | Avalanche Stage | Dogtooth Stage |
| Fall Out Boy; The Offspring; Enter Shikari; Babymetal; Frank Carter & the Rattlesnakes; The Hunna; Wargasm; Bambie Thug | Pantera; While She Sleeps; Tom Morello; Slaughter to Prevail; Karnivool; Bleed from Within; Alien Weaponry; Asinhell; Heriot; Florence Black | Billy Talent; Holding Absence; Silverstein; Noahfinnce; RØRY; Charlotte Sands; Lowlives; DeathbyRomy; HotWax; Mallavora | Fear Factory; Dying Fetus; Alpha Wolf; Ne Obliviscaris; Dying Wish; Gel; Guilt Trip; Calva Louise; Alt Blk Era; Knife Bride; Celestial Sanctuary |

Sunday 16 June
| Main Stage | Opus Stage | Avalanche Stage | Dogtooth Stage |
| Avenged Sevenfold; Limp Bizkit; Sum 41; Bowling for Soup; Kerry King; Creeper; Code Orange; Lord of the Lost | Machine Head; Corey Taylor; Thy Art Is Murder; Zebrahead; Elvana; Royal Republic; 311; Kelsy Karter & the Heroines | The Used; Counterparts; Hoobastank; Atreyu; Of Mice & Men; Tigercub; Pinkshift; Noisy; Cemetery Sun; Delilah Bon | The Black Dahlia Murder; Erra; Fit for a King; Shadow of Intent; Imminence; Brand of Sacrifice; Crystal Lake; Parkway Drive; Missio; Underside; Harper; Until I Wake |

Scowl, Pest Control, Zulu, Speed and Ithaca were booked to perform but pulled out because of the festivals partnership with Barclays, and their ties to Israel. The bank later suspended their sponsorship of Download and other UK festivals, following pressure from fans of Download and other artists who had been booked to play at the festival.

Bad Omens were set to headline the Opus stage on the Friday, but pulled out due to mental health concerns, they were replaced by Funeral for a Friend

== 2025 ==
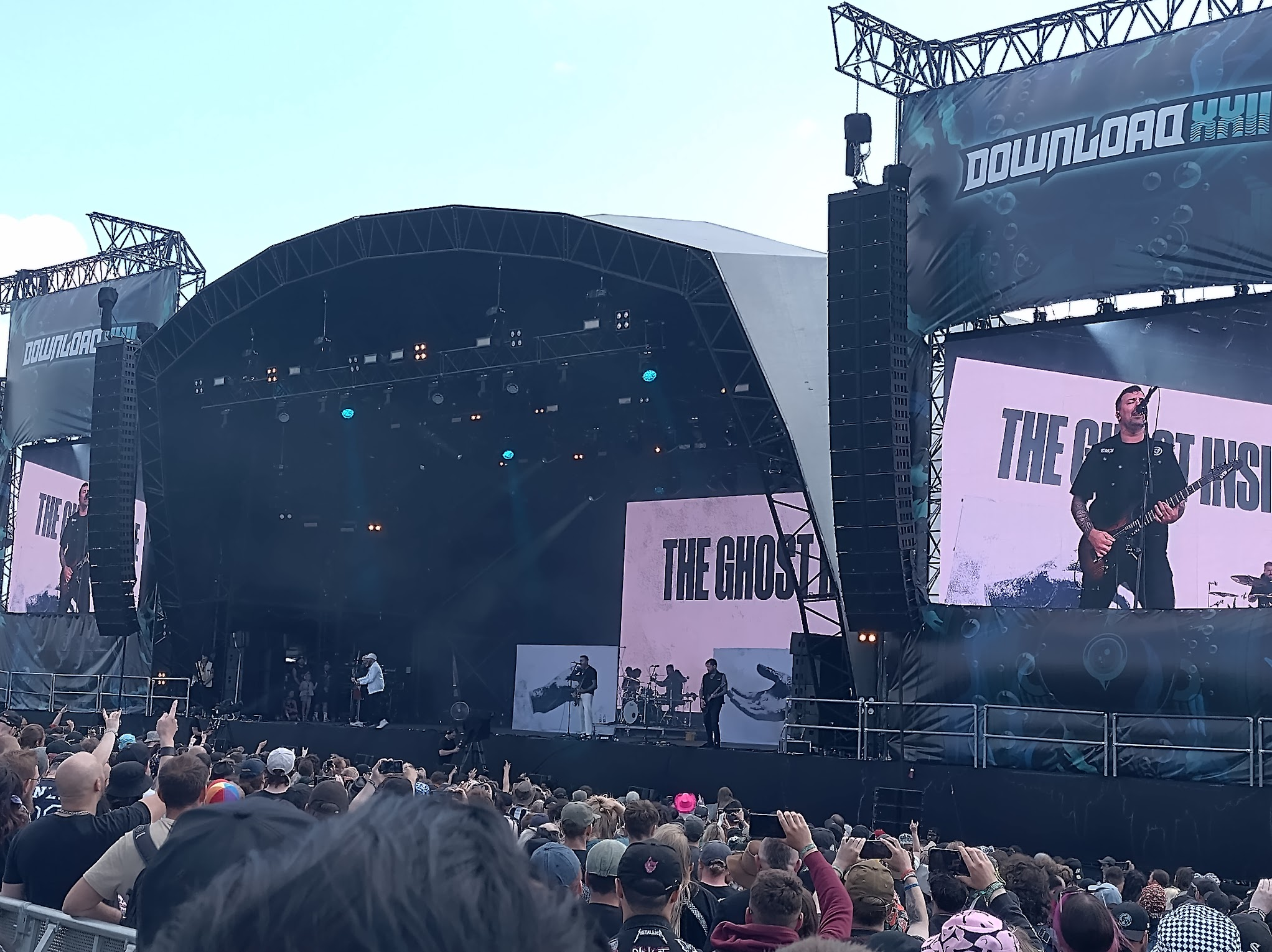
The Ghost Inside at Download Festival 2025

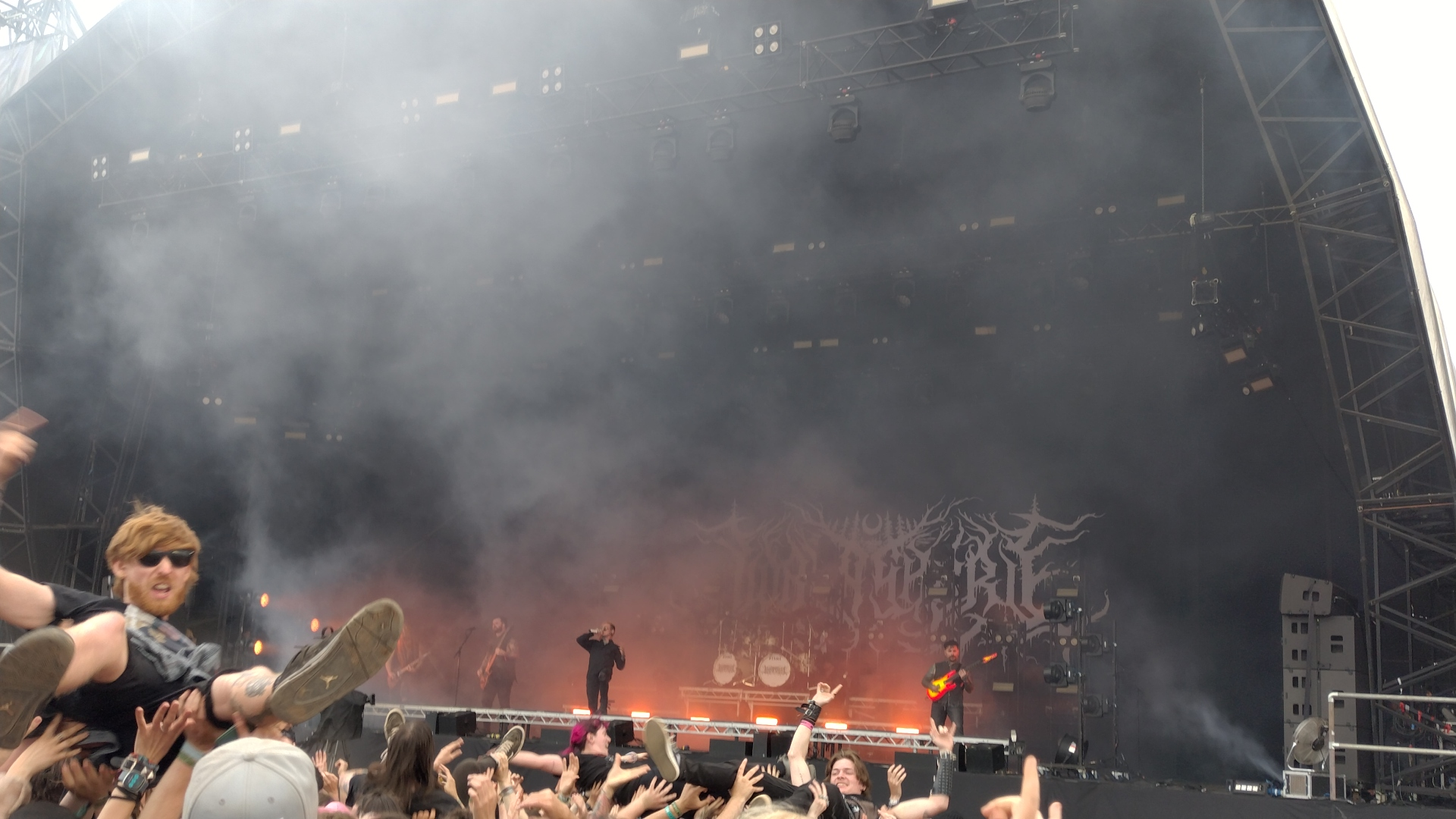
Lorna Shore at Download Festival 2025

Download Festival returned to Donington Park on 13–15 June 2025. Band announcements began on 12 November 2024, with over 90 acts confirmed to appear, including main stage headliners Green Day, Sleep Token and Korn. The festival received backlash led by artists NOAHFINNCE, Pinkshift, and Witch Fever after the festival stated that it would be acting in accordance with UK governmental guidance prohibiting trans women from using women's facilities. In response, the festival said it would make the majority of its bathrooms gender neutral, but that segregated women's facilities would still be there.

Friday 13 June
| Apex Stage | Opus Stage | Avalanche Stage | Dogtooth Stage |
| Green Day; Weezer; Jimmy Eat World; Rise Against; Boston Manor; CKY; SiM | Within Temptation; Opeth; Myles Kennedy; Starset; Northlane; Dirty Honey; The Scratch | McFly; Elliot Minor; Crossfaith; Trophy Eyes; Bad Nerves; The Meffs; Unpeople; Dead Pony; Karen Dío | Apocalyptica; Eivør; Alcest; Vola; Svalbard; Windhand; Graphic Nature; Riding the Low; Gore. Battlesnake; The Haunt |

Saturday 14 June
| Apex Stage | Opus Stage | Avalanche Stage | Dogtooth Stage |
| Sleep Token; Shinedown; Don Broco; Palaye Royale; Poppy; Hatebreed; Loathe; Static Dress | Sex Pistols featuring Frank Carter; The Darkness; Eagles of Death Metal; Polaris; Awolnation; Currents; Kim Dracula; Sophie Lloyd | Dayseeker; Mallory Knox; Twin Atlantic; Smash into Pieces; Mothica; LØLØ; Split Chain; Venus Grrrls; Bex; Autumn Fires | Cradle of Filth; Sylosis; Kittie; Anaal Nathrakh; The Funeral Portrait; Teen Mortgage; Holy Wars; Underside; Zetra; Bastardane; Lastelle; Artio |

Sunday 15 June
| Apex Stage | Opus Stage | Avalanche Stage | Dogtooth Stage |
| Korn; Bullet for My Valentine; Spiritbox; Meshuggah; Jinjer; Power Trip; Bleed from Within; Orbit Culture | Steel Panther; Lorna Shore; Airbourne; Jerry Cantrell; Alien Ant Farm; Municipal Waste; The Ghost Inside; Nothing More; Seven Hours After Violet; The Southern River Band | Kids in Glass Houses; Me First and the Gimme Gimmes; Turbonegro; Dead Poet Society; House of Protection; Spiritual Cramp; Amira Elfeky; Arrows in Action; Harpy | SikTh; Whitechapel; Fit for an Autopsy; Novelists; Unprocessed; President; Vowws; Survive Said the Prophet; Vower; Faetooth; Archers; Neckbreakker |

Cattle Decapitation were scheduled to play on the Sunday, but pulled out in June 2025.

In 2025, Download Festival entered into a partnership with cosmetics company Lush, with Lush producing a co-branded "wash-pit" set which included a bath bomb, an "Ace Of Sprays" body spray and soap. However, Lush ended its commercial partnership with Download Festival later that same month in response to the event organisers' policy regarding which toilet facilities trans people can use.

== 2026 ==
Download returned to Donington Park on 12–14 June 2026, including headliners Limp Bizkit, Guns N' Roses and Linkin Park.

Friday 12 June
| Apex Stage | Opus Stage | Avalanche Stage | Dogtooth Stage |
| Limp Bizkit; Cypress Hill; Electric Callboy; Pendulum; Hollywood Undead; P.O.D. Scene Queen | Halestorm; Daughtry; Periphery; Creeper; Paleface Swiss; Silent Planet; Caskets | Feeder; Story of the Year; Sleep Theory; Rain City Drive; Drain; Lakeview; Holywatr; Silly Goose; Native James | Cavalera; Corrosion of Conformity; Band-Maid; Stampin' Ground; The Primals; Lake Malice; Nasty; Vianova; James and the Cold Gun; Slay Squad; Headwreck |

Saturday 13 June
| Apex Stage | Opus Stage | Avalanche Stage | Dogtooth Stage |
| Guns N' Roses; Trivium; Babymetal; Black Veil Brides; Landmvrks; South Arcade; Thornhill | Architects; Behemoth; Bush; Set It Off; Those Damn Crows; We Came as Romans; As Everything Unfolds; Snot; The Wildhearts | The All-American Rejects; Hot Milk; Marmozets; As It Is; Melrose Avenue; Mouth Culture; Die Spitz; Nevertel; Frozemode | Blood Incantation; Decapitated; Elder; Sweet Savage; Self Deception; Drowning Pool; Return to Dust; Conjurer; Lowen; Tailgunner; Tropic Gold; Pussyliquor |

Sunday 14 June
| Apex Stage | Opus Stage | Avalanche Stage | Dogtooth Stage |
| Linkin Park; Bad Omens; Ice Nine Kills; The Pretty Reckless; Bloodywood; RØRY; Kublai Khan TX; Unpeople | A Day to Remember; Mastodon; Tom Morello; Social Distortion; The Plot in You; Thrown; Dogstar; Mammoth; Catch Your Breath; Ego Kill Talent | Scooter; Letlive; Ash; Dinosaur Pile-Up; Magnolia Park; TX2; Sweet Pill; The Pretty Wild; Ivri; Zero 9:36; Mould | Creeper; Spineshank; Gatecreeper; Boundaries; Ankor; Annisokay; Last Train; Decessus; Wayside; Private School; Spitting Glass |

Five were announced to headline Thursday night alongside Electric Six and Cancer Bats. Imminence were originally scheduled to perform, but pulled out on 23 February 2026 due to "scheduling conflicts". Static-X cancelled all their 2026 tour dates, including Download, due to "serious medical issues", Creeper were announced as their replacements, headlining the Dogtooth stage on the Sunday. This makes three sets Creeper played over the weekend, including a DJ set in District X, making them tied with Slipknot frontman Corey Taylor for most sets played at one edition of the festival. Tailgunner were expected to be ousted from the lineup following undisclosed allegations made against bassist and founder Thomas Hewson, but played anyway.

== 2027 ==
Download's 24th year is set to return on 11-13 June. The first wave of bands were announced on 12 November 2026, including headliners Blink-182, Bring Me the Horizon and Evanescence with Faith No More returning to the UK since reuniting in 2026.

== See also ==
- Bloodstock Open Air
- List of Festivals at Donington Park
- List of historic rock festivals
- Love Not Riots
