= Elvana =

British crossover tribute band

Elvana: Elvis-fronted Nirvana is a British crossover tribute band which performs the music of American grunge band Nirvana in the style of an Elvis impersonator.

The group was founded in 2014, in Newcastle upon Tyne. Its members are four musicians who enjoyed performing grunge music, and had experience of covering Nirvana songs. When asked to perform a set of Nirvana covers at a friend's party, the band realised that they did not bear any resemblance to the members of Nirvana, and so decided instead to perform dressed as Elvis Presley. The concept proved popular, and they played at increasingly large venues. Over time, they began breaking down some of the Nirvana songs into Elvis ones.

The band have stated that they are fans of both Nirvana and Elvis, and regard their performances as being respectful to both acts. The lead singer has described his Elvis impersonation as being "everyday, slightly-dodgy" and as "punk rock".

The band performed at the 2022 Glastonbury Festival. The Scotsman named them as one of the top ten bands performing at the 2023 Download Festival.
