= No Hot Ashes =

British post pop disco funk band

- Origin: Stockport, England
- Genres: Indie pop, Disco, Funk
- Years active: 2012–2021
- Label: Modern Sky UK
- Past members: Isaac Taylor; Luigi Di Vuono; Jack Walsh; Matt Buckley

No Hot Ashes were a British "post pop" disco funk band from Stockport, Greater Manchester, consisting of Isaac Taylor (vocals/guitar), Luigi Di Vuono (guitar), Jack Walsh (bass) and Matt Buckley (drums). The band released several singles followed by an EP, Skint Kids Disco, before releasing their debut album Hardship Starship in 2019. In March 2020, the band announced an indefinite hiatus and that they would be playing two final shows the following month. These were later delayed until March 2021 and eventually cancelled due to the COVID-19 pandemic.

== History ==
=== Formation ===
Drummer Matt Buckley and guitarist Luigi Di Vuono met in 2012 while the pair were studying music together. By 2013 they had been joined by bassist Jack Walsh and vocalist/lyricist Isaac Taylor, who they met on a school bus. The group regularly practiced in Buckley's garage, where they would perform for friends. The band have mentioned that they regret picking the name No Hot Ashes, with Di Vuono saying “It’s off wheelie bins, it’s the worst name ever, we hate it”, but decided that changing it on all of the band's social media platforms would be too much of a hassle.

=== Skint Kids Disco EP and Hardship Starship ===
The band released several singles between 2014 and 2017 and were featured on BBC Radio Manchester, BBC Radio 6 and ITV News. In 2017 they released Skint Kids Disco EP and performed at festivals and events across the UK including the Isle of Wight Festival. The title track Skint Kids Disco, was featured in the third series of acclaimed BBC drama series The A Word, which began in May 2020.

After touring with bands Blossoms, Spring King, The Amazons, and Prides, No Hot Ashes announced their debut album Hardship Starship in 2019. The album was released on the 15th of August, to generally favourable reviews.

=== Hiatus ===
On March 12, 2020, the band announced via their social media that they would be "ending their journey" but "not forever", citing difficulty in maintaining a balance between real-life issues and the pressures of the band. They had originally planned to play two final "farewell" shows in April 2020, however these were delayed until March 2021 due to the COVID-19 pandemic and eventually cancelled.

== Discography ==
- Skint Kids Disco EP (2017)
- Hardship Starship (2019)
