= Fall from Grace (band) =

American rock band

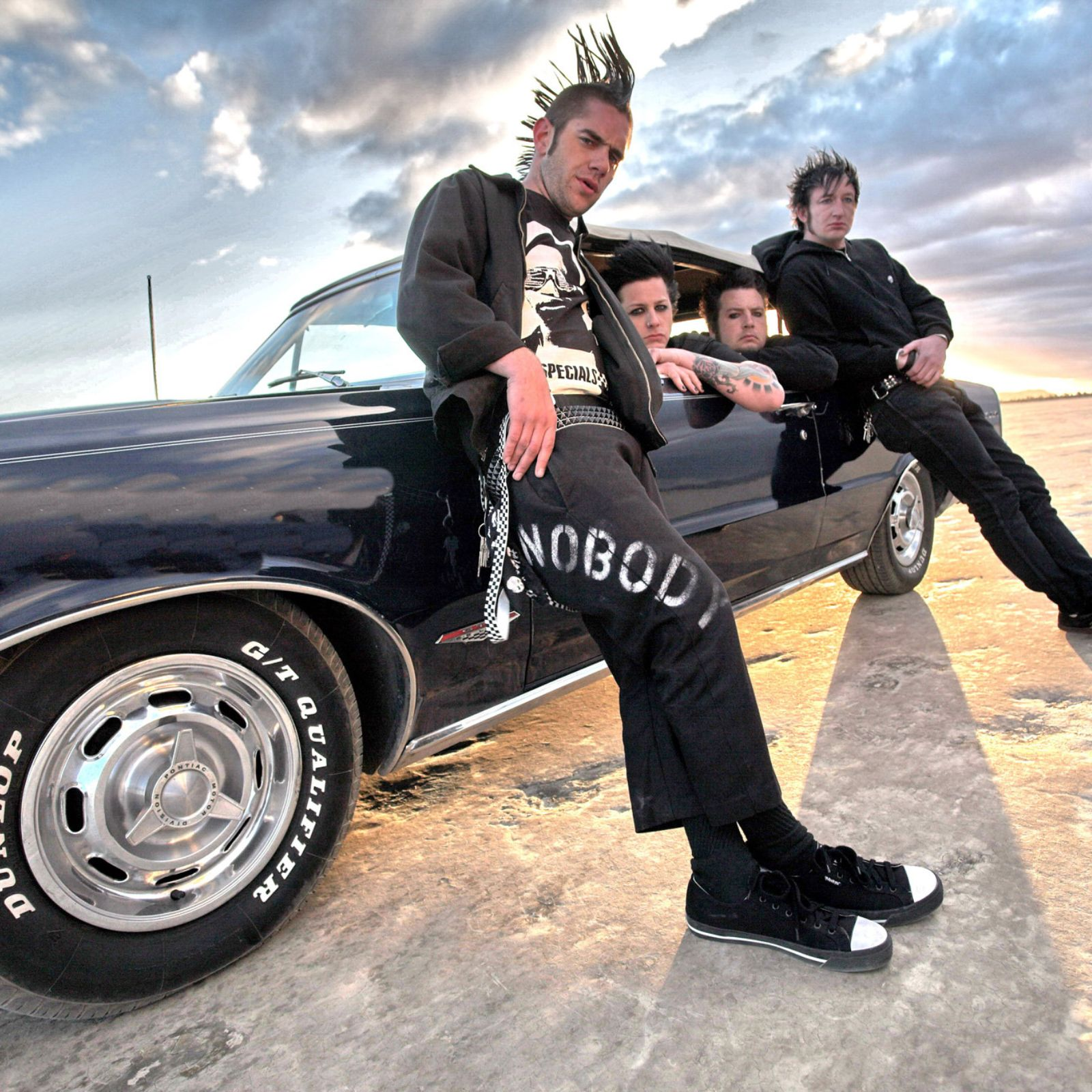
- FFG Original Lineup pictured in Victorville, 2007.

Background information
- Origin: Seattle, Washington, U.S.
- Genres: Alternative rock, alternative metal, hardcore punk
- Years active: 2004–2012
- Labels: Bodog Music, Road to Hell Rekkids
- Past members: Brian "Btown" Olson; Jesse Smith; Tryg Littlefield; Cotton; Ty Mcdonald; Kenny "KennyB" Bates; Ken "Big Ken" Olson
- Website: fallfromgrace.us

Fall from Grace was an American alternative rock band formed in 2004 in Seattle, Washington. Born in 2004, the original lineup "rose from the ashes" of 3 other local Seattle bands: The Highsiders, Capacity 3, and 3 Deuces.

== History ==
Upon their release of Rise From The Ashes, the band quickly gained steam by DIY (do it yourself) touring full time and creating their own merch, street teams, and running their own shows. In 2005 they began working on the first Full Length album, Covered in Scars.

FFG is best known for winning said Fuse TV's reality show Bodog Music Battle of the Bands, and winning that $1mm dollar recording contract with Bodog Music. FFG beat out over 7,000 bands in the end, the top ten of which they toured with for the prize. Those 10 bands included Boston's "Fear Nuttin' Band", Miami's "Big Bang Radio", Dallas's "Ashmore", Houston's "Subversa", Atlanta's "The Mood", Minneapolis's "Leroy Smokes", Los Angeles's "Blaxmyth", Phoenix's "Idle Red", San Francisco's "Strifer", and Philadelphia's "Burn Down All Stars".

The band released their first major label album, Sifting Through the Wreckage, in 2009, and toured with Alesana, Protest the Hero, CKY, and Graveyard to support the album. The album includes the singles "Burned", "Hated Youth", "King of Lies" and "Pictures on the Wall".

On November 5, 2012, Fall From Grace announced their split after their final tour.

== Discography ==
- Rise from the Ashes (2004, self-release)
- Covered in Scars (2006, self-release)
- Sifting Through the Wreckage (November 4, 2008, Bodog Music/Bunkrock Music)
- The Romance Years (January 24, 2012 Road 2 Hell Rekkids)

=== Singles ===
- "Covered in Scars" (from Covered in Scars)
- "Burned" (from Sifting Through the Wreckage)
- "Hated Youth" (from Sifting Through the Wreckage)
- "King of Lies" (from Sifting Through the Wreckage)
- "Pictures on the Wall" (from Sifting Through the Wreckage)
- "18 and Out" (from The Romance Years)

== Band members ==
- Tryg Littlefield – lead vocals, rhythm guitar
- Brian Olson – lead guitar, backing vocals
- Ty McDonald – guitars
- Justin "Cotton" McDonald – bass, backing vocals
- Jesse Smith – drums, vocals

=== Former members ===
- Kenny Bates – drums
- Ken Olson – bass, backing vocals
