= Phoenix: The Very Best of InMe =

Phoenix: The Best of InMe

Greatest hits album by InMe
- Released: 27 September 2010 - UK; Late 2010 - Europe
- Recorded: June 2010 (tracks 6,9 and 15) with Mike Curtis of Fei Comodo
- Genre: Alternative rock, alternative metal, post-grunge
- Length: Unknown
- Label: Graphite Records / Northern Music
- Producer: Mike Curtis (new tracks)

InMe chronology
Herald Moth (2009)	Phoenix: The Best of InMe (2010)	The Pride (2012)

Professional ratings
Review scores
Source	Rating
Kerrang!	4/5 stars

Phoenix: The Best of InMe is a greatest hits collection put together from the British band InMe's first four albums spanning 8 years from 2002 to 2010. It was released on 27 September 2010.

== Background ==
On their "All Terrain Armada" tour in May/June 2010, InMe frontman Dave McPherson stated both on stage and in interviews conducted on the tour that the band had started learning older material from their first two albums (Overgrown Eden and White Butterfly) to support a 'best of' release which would follow in the winter.

It later emerged that the best of would contain three songs from each of InMe's four studio albums (2003's Overgrown Eden, 2005's White Butterfly, 2007's Daydream Anonymous, and 2009's Herald Moth) as well as three new tracks. These new songs will be the first to feature new lead guitarist Gazz Marlow in a full band environment.

The track list was revealed on 19 July 2010 and it was released on 27 September 2010.

== Musical style ==
The album will span InMe's entire career and vast variety of soundscapes. Earlier material showcased on the compilation such as "Crushed Like Fruit" and "Safe In A Room" has a grunge like bounce to it whilst maintaining mainstream pop sensibility, whereas songs from Daydream Anonymous bear a more technical yet melodic metal influence on InMe's catchy rock songs. Material from 2009's Herald Moth further exacerbates InMe's heavy technical sound as well as their softer, heartfelt side, with the three new songs ("Saccharine Arcadia", "Bury Me Deep Within Your Skin" and "Thanks For Believing Me") taking both of these aspects to even further extremes.

== Supporting Tour ==
In order to promote Phoenix, InMe played each of their current 4 studio albums in their entirety on consecutive weekends in November/December at The Relentless Garage in London. In addition to this, the band played one warm up show for each album the night before each London show in a different city. Overgrown Eden was performed in Sheffield, White Butterfly in Manchester, Daydream Anonymous in Cardiff and Herald Moth in Leicester.

== Track listing ==
All songs arranged by Dave McPherson. Music by InMe.

1. "Safe in a Room" – from 2005's White Butterfly
2. "Nova Armada" – from 2009's Herald Moth
3. "Myths & Photographs" – from 2007's Daydream Anonymous
4. "Underdose" – from 2003's Overgrown Eden
5. "Bury Me Deep Beneath Your Skin" – recorded in 2010 for Phoenix
6. "All Terrain Vehicle" – from 2009's Herald Moth
7. "Cracking the Whip" – from 2007's Daydream Anonymous
8. "Firefly" – from 2003's Overgrown Eden
9. "Thanks for Believing Me" – recorded in 2010 for Phoenix
10. "Single of the Weak" – from 2009's Herald Moth
11. "Crushed Like Fruit" – from 2003's Overgrown Eden
12. "Thanks for Leaving Me" – from 2007's Daydream Anonymous
13. "Faster the Chase" – from 2005's White Butterfly
14. "Chamber" – from 2005's White Butterfly
15. "Saccharine Arcadia" – recorded in 2010 for Phoenix
16. "Daydream Anonymous" (acoustic) * – recorded in 2010 for Phoenix
17. "Master Storm" (acoustic) * – recorded in 2010 for Phoenix

* iTunes download-only bonus track

== Personnel ==
=== Line up at time of release ===
- Dave McPherson – vocals, guitar on tracks 1–15.
- Gazz Marlow – lead guitar on tracks 5, 9 and 15–17
- Greg McPherson – bass guitar on tracks 2–3,5–7,9–10,12 and 15
- Simon Taylor – drums, percussion on tracks 1–15.

== Other members ==
- Ben Konstantinovic – lead guitar on tracks 2,6 and 10.
- Joe Morgan – bass guitar on tracks 1,4,8,11,13 and 14.

== Chart performance ==
Chart (2010)	Peak position
UK Rock & Metal Albums (OCC)	26
