= All These Nights in Bars Will Somehow Save My Soul =

Studio album by Rob Lynch
- Released: 22 September 2014
- Genre: Alternative rock, indie rock, folk
- Length: 38:37
- Label: Xtra Mile Recordings
- Producer: Shane Henderson, Sam Duckworth, Jay Malhotra

Rob Lynch chronology
No Blood (2012)	All These Nights in Bars Will Somehow Save My Soul (2014)

Professional ratings
Review scores
Source	Rating
Rock Sound	7/10 stars

All These Nights in Bars Will Somehow Save My Soul is the debut studio album from English singer-songwriter Rob Lynch (formerly known as Lost on Campus) released on 22 September 2014. The album features re-recorded versions of My Friends & I and Whiskey from the Rob Lynch EP and in Pursuit Of Courage & Heart respectively.

== Track listing ==
All music is composed by Rob Lynch.

No.	Title	Length
1.	"31/32"	0:49
2.	"Broken Bones"	3:26
3.	"My Friends & I"	3:13
4.	"Whiskey"	2:43
5.	"True Romance"	3:08
6.	"Stamford"	3:54
7.	"Some Nights"	4:35
8.	"Hand Grenade"	3:45
9.	"Feeling Good"	3:34
10.	"Medicine"	4:42
11.	"Blame"	2:12
12.	"Widow"	2:36
Total length:		38:37

== Personnel ==
- Rob Lynch – guitar/vocals/percussion
- Annie Rew-Shaw – piano/organ/keys
- Bob Cooper – glockenspiel
- Charlie Thomas – drums
- Daniel Rothwell – trombone
- Jay Malhotra – bass/electric guitar/strings/glockenspiel/lapsteel/percussion
- Joe Boynton – vocals
- Nick Worpole – vocals
- Sam Cook – electric guitar/vocals
- Sam Duckworth – electric guitar/vocals/programming/keys/piano
- Sarah Maynard – flute
- Shane Henderson – acoustic guitar
- Terry Murphy – viola
- Trevor Leonard – harmonica/vocals
