= Dana Nielsen =

American music producer, engineer, mixer and saxophonist

- Origin: Chicago
- Genres: Rock, metal, pop, hip hop, jazz, folk
- Occupations: Record producer, engineer, mixer and musician
- Instruments: Saxophone, Voice, Keyboards, Programming
- Website: dananielsen.com

Dana Nielsen is an American mix engineer, audio engineer, record producer and saxophonist based in Los Angeles. Nielsen has worked with a wide range of artists including Metallica, Rihanna, The Avett Brothers, Bob Dylan, Adele, Neil Diamond, Slayer and Weezer. In 2006 Nielsen mixed the full length, limited edition of Neil Diamond's 12 Songs album and in 2008 Dana mixed Neil Diamond's #1 selling album, Home Before Dark. In 2012, Nielsen was nominated for a Grammy award for Rihanna's album Loud.

Nielsen also composes music for picture and has worked on projects such as Will Ferrell's Anchorman 2 (Paramount) and Casa De Mi Padre (NALA). He has also produced music for several hit television shows including Queer Eye for the Straight Guy, America's Next Top Model, and the Duplass Brother's HBO series Room 104.

Nielsen has worked as an additional Engineer on Grammy winning recordings by Justin Timberlake and Red Hot Chili Peppers and has worked on a number of records produced by Rick Rubin including Metallica's Death Magnetic, Adele's 21, Slayer's World Painted Blood, Red Hot Chili Pepper's Stadium Arcadium, and System of a Down's Hypnotize and Mezmerize. Nielsen can be seen on screen working as an engineer alongside Rick Rubin and David Letterman in episode 4 (feat. Jay Z) of Letterman's Netflix series "My Next Guest Needs No Introduction." Nielsen is also featured in the Judd Apatow/Michael Bonfiglio HBO documentary, "May It Last: A Portrait of the Avett Brothers."

More recently, Nielsen has recorded and mixed The Ruen Brothers All My Shades of Blue, mixed Damien Rice's My Favourite Faded Fantasy recorded, mixed, and played on The Avett Brother's #1 selling album True Sadness (Republic) and recorded Neil Diamond and Promise of The Real for their latest album The Visitor (Reprise).

== Partial discography ==
Artist	Year	Album	Mixer	Engineer	Editing	Musician	Producer
The Smashing Pumpkins	2018	Shiny and Oh So Bright	check	check			
DRAM	2018	Check Ya Fabrics	check	check			
Promise of the Real / Neil Young	2017	The Visitor		check			
Lukas Nelson & Promise of the Real / Neil Young	2017	Earth			check		
The Avett Brothers	2016	True Sadness	check	check			
Crown And The M.O.B	2016	All Hail Now	check	check		check	co-P
Ruen Brothers	2015	Point Dume	check				
Damien Rice	2014	My Favorite Faded Fantasy	check				
Noah Gundersen	2014	Ledges	check				
Crown	2013	Forthcoming Album	check	check	check	check	check
Black Sabbath	2013	13!		check			
Anchorman 2	2013	Original Score (by Andrew Feltenstein)	check	check	check	check	check
Jake Bugg	2013	"Shangri La"		check			
Kanye West	2013	"Yeezus"		check			
Johnnyswim	2013	"Heart Beats EP"			check		
Jennifer Nettles	2013	"That Girl"		check	check		
Bob Dylan	2012	Tempest	check	check			
Christina Aguilera	2012	"Casa de Mi Padre" (Single)	check	check			
Chic Gamine	2012	Closer	check				
Those Darlins	2012	"Pet You And Hold You" (Single)	check				
Avett Brothers	2012	"The Carpenters"				check	
Red Hot Chili Peppers	2011	I'm With You			check		
Adele	2011	21			check		
Alela Diane	2011	Alela Diane & Wild Devine		check			
Rihanna	2011	Loud		check			
Outasight	2011	Figure 8 EP	check				
We Are Scientists	2010	Barbara			check		
Slayer	2009	World Painted Blood		check			
The Gossip	2009	Music For Men		check	check		
Thirty Seconds to Mars	2009	This Is War		check			
The Avett Brothers	2009	I and Love and You			check		
Cecilia Noël	2009	A Gozar!		check			
Jakob Dylan	2008	Seeing Things		check			
Metallica	2008	Death Magnetic			check		
Neil Diamond	2008	Home Before Dark	check		check		
Weezer	2008	Red		check			
Jesse Lewis	2008	Atticus	check				
The Hush Sound	2008	Goodbye Blues			check		
Valencia	2008	We All Need a Reason to Believe			check		
Linkin Park	2007	Minutes to Midnight		check			
Dan Wilson	2007	Free Life		check			
Alex Acuna	2007	The Rhythm Collector		check			
Red Hot Chili Peppers	2006	Stadium Arcadium		check	check		
Justin Timberlake	2006	FutureSex/LoveSounds		check			
Anti-Flag	2006	For Blood & Empire			check		
Heavens	2006	Patent Pending			check		
Neil Diamond	2005	12 Songs (Artist's Cut)	check	check			
System of a Down	2005	Mesmerize			check		
System of a Down	2005	Hypnotize			check		
