= Walnut Tree Records =

- Founded: 2007–2012
- Founder: Tom Beck
- Genre: Alternative rock Pop-Punk; Indie rock
- Country of origin: United Kingdom
- Location: Watford, Hertfordshire
- Official website: walnuttreerecords.co.uk

Walnut Tree Records, was a British independent record label from Watford which specialised in limited run releases from new and upcoming bands.

== History ==
Walnut Tree Records started life as "The Walnut Tree" in July 2006, a small scale per-zine and CD distribution business. In an interview with AlterThePress.com, founder Tom Beck stated that he "was working on a different genre of music in his full-time job and was falling out of love with music a little" and wanted to find a way to change that. After reading a positive review of The Wonder Years and Bangarang split EP on Punktastic.com Beck contacted The Wonder Years directly to ask if he could import their CD and sell it to potential fans in the UK. This was followed by releases from the likes of Valencia and Four Year Strong, all of which were without a distribution deal in the UK at the time. The Walnut Tree gained a reputation as somewhere to buy cheap releases from up and coming bands and allowed Beck to build up a small network of frequent buyers.

After complications with a release, Beck decided to focus on helping unsigned UK bands, founding Walnut Tree Records in July 2007. The label initially co-financed releases with Pep Rock Records and No Order Records, before then taking full control of releases from March 2008.

Walnut Tree Records released 27 records over 5 years, distributing a further 15 in the same period.

The label was closed in August 2012.

== List of former artists ==
- Bayonets
- Burn The Fleet
- Cuba Cuba
- Drawings
- Gunning For Tamar
- Indian School
- Paige
- Portman
- Rob Lynch
- The Maple State
- Tiger Please
- Viva Sleep
- Waiting For Sleep

== Release catalogue ==
This is the release list of Walnut Tree Records in chronological order...

1. Paige – (If You Say So) (NOWTR001) (March 2008 (ltd. 1000))
2. Portman – From Here To Your Eyes And Ears (PEPWTR002) (March 2008 (ltd. 1000))
3. Waiting For Sirens – Self Titled (WTR001) (July 2008 (ltd. 1000))
4. Portman – Remembering Fondly (WTR002) (December 2008 (ltd. 100 physical / free download))
5. Portman – Unplugged (WTR003) (December 2008 (ltd. 100 physical / free download))
6. Bayonets – Wishes & Wishes (WTR004) (March 2009 (ltd. 1000))
7. Portman – These Songs Were Written In Bedrooms & Village Halls (WTR005) (June 2009 (ltd. 500))
8. Various Artists – Punktastic: Un-Scene 5 (WTR006) (August 2009 (Charity compilation))
9. Tiger Please – They Don't Change Under Moonlight (WTR007) (November 2009 (ltd. 1000))
10. Viva Sleep – The House Of Viva Sleep (WTR008) (February 2010 (ltd. 100))
11. Burn The Fleet – Burn The Fleet (WTR009) (March 2010 (ltd. 1000))
12. Tiger Please – Seasons (WTR010) (May 2010 (ltd. 1000))
13. Cuba Cuba – Home Is The Fire (WTR011) (May 2010))
14. Various Artists – Discovery (WTR012) (July 2010))
15. Burn The Fleet – Black Holes (WTR013) (October 2010))
16. Delta / Alaska – Start With The Cage (WTR014) (November 2010))
17. Call Me Ishmael – I Am Stop, You Are Go (WTR015) (November 2010))
18. Day Of Rising – American Professional (WTR016) (November 2010))
19. The Maple State – First The Worst (WTR017) (November 2010))
20. Newlands – Say (WTR018) (November 2010))
21. Ghostlines – Act Your Innocence (WTR019) (December 2010))
22. Drawings – Bones (WTR020) (March 2011))
23. Gunning For Tamar – Deaf Cow Motel (WTR021) (May 2011))
24. Cuba Cuba – Where Else Is Safe But The Road? (WTR022) (June 2011))
25. Rob Lynch – The East EP (WTR023) (October 2011))
26. Tiger Please – They Don't Change Under Moonlight 12" vinyl (WTR024) (April 2012))
27. Indian School – The Cruelest Kind EP (WTR025) (April 2012))

== Releases distributed by Walnut Tree Records ==
Walnut Tree Records also offered a CD distribution service. Originally titled The Walnut Tree, the service offered new and hard to reach releases from North American bands to the UK public at cost base prices. The releases were available in a limited run and only through the label's online store. The idea behind this service was that often these releases, at the time of distribution, weren't cost effective when importing single copies and therefore Walnut Tree Records felt that bulk buying them direct from the bands or labels would make it easier for UK fans to buy physical copies.

This was also at a time when music fans would like to own physical copies of smaller releases.

1. The Wonder Years / Bangarang! – (Split EP)
2. Permanent Me – {Dear Virginia EP)
3. The Consequence - By The Bedside
4. Valencia – This Could Be a Possibility
5. Four Year Strong – {(Rise Or Die Trying))
6. Stars Hide Fire – (Shortcut To Loss)
7. Daggermouth – (Turf Wars)
8. Daggermouth – (Stallone)
9. Nothing Unexpected – (Nothing Unexpected)
10. Arden – (The Big Picture EP)
11. Olympians – (You Were My Inspiration)
12. The Lion And The Wolf – (The Lion And The Wolf EP)
13. The Republic Of Wolves – (His Old Branches EP)
14. The Republic Of Wolves – (Varuna)
15. Day Of Rising – (Deceivers United)
16. City Light Thief – (Laviin)

== Bands appearing on Walnut Tree Records releases ==
The following bands have all featured on at least one Walnut Tree Records release. Those in bold were full releases, those in italics were distributed through the label:

A Broken Robot, A Word Like.Attack, All Or Nothing, Arden, Attention, Bangarang!, Bangers, Bayonets, Brave Citizens, Burn The Fleet, Call Me Ishmael, Canterbury, City Light Thief, Cuba Cuba, Cutting Class, Daggermouth, Danger Is My Middle Name, Day Of Rising, Delta/Alaska, Don Broco, Drawings, Fire In The Attic, Fluid Lines, Four Year Strong, Francesqa, Ghostlines, Great Caesar, Gunning For Tamar, Have You Heard, Indian School, Joey Terrifying, Kidnapper Bell, Liam Clayton, Lonely The Brave, LYU, Mutiny On The Bounty, Mybe, Newlands, Nothing Unexpected, Olympians, Over And Out, Overthrow, Paige, Pareto, Permanent Me, Portman, Samoans, Show It Off!, Taking Chase, The Barent Sea, The Consequence, The Law Among Tigers, The Lion And The Wolf, The Long Haul, The Maple State, The Republic Of Wolves, The Ruined, The Tupolev Ghost, The Wonder Years, The Vanity Score, They Sink Ships, Tiger Please, Valencia, Venice Ahoy, Viva Sleep, We Push Buttons, Wilson Fisk, Wolf Am I.
