= Herald Moth =

Studio album by InMe
- Released: 14 September 2009 - UK; 16 September 2009 - Japan; November 2009 - Europe
- Recorded: January – February 2009
- Studio: Set to be Chapel Studios
- Genre: Alternative rock, alternative metal
- Length: 53:29 (standard edition)
- Label: Graphite Records / Northern Music
- Producer: Ewan Davies

InMe chronology
iTunes Live: London Festival '08 (2008)	Herald Moth (2009)	Phoenix: The Best of InMe (2010)

Professional ratings
Review scores
Source	Rating
Allgigs	6/10 stars
4or the Record	(positive) link
Kerrang!	4/5 stars
Rock Sound	7/10 stars
RockSins	link
Shankenstir	4/5 stars

Herald Moth is the fourth studio album by InMe, released on 14 September 2009. It is their only album to feature Ben Konstantinovic on guitar. Following Konstantinovic's departure, Gary Marlow joined the band on 1 February 2010. The album peaked at number 68 on the official UK albums chart.

== Development ==
On 5 October 2007, lead singer Dave McPherson announced on his personal MySpace that in the next few months he will be working on a new album for InMe. From his blog:

It is splendid to be home, getting clean clothes and resting the ears and chilling with loved ones. But InMe's next move is already on the cards...more news soon. I will be using this time off to continue writing InMe's 4th project which is going to be something very different and challenging. The heavy technical stuff is going to be elaborated on as well as the slower songs are going to be thought out very intimately. Obviously these are very early days but one may as well get cracking.

McPherson started playing a new InMe song acoustically in his solo shows together with his solo lead-guitarist Ben Konstantinovic who consequently joined the band in the summer of 2008.

He will be my lead guitarist from now on...as for InMe... We may be making a few massive changes come summertime.

On 18 September, McPherson revealed through his solo Myspace that the fourth album will be titled Herald Moth. He also released a video blog on YouTube where he spoke about the fourth opus. The following day, McPherson revealed that Herald Moth would be recorded at Chapel Studios, where the band's first album, Overgrown Eden, had been recorded. The producer was confirmed to be Ewan Davies, who had produced InMe songs such as "Gelosea", "Inside", "The End", "Your Pain", "Angels with Snipers" and "Every Whisper Aches".

On 24 November, the band revealed that their upcoming UK tour with Pendulum had been cancelled due to money problems but that would still try to make the Brixton Academy dates possible. The band also revealed that they would be entering the studio to put the finishing touches to the upcoming album on 5 January 2009, meaning that the album could be out as early as spring 2009.

On 1 December 2008 a selection of clips from the demos recorded for Herald Moth were uploaded to InMe's Myspace.

On 5 January 2009 InMe started recording with producer Ewan Davies at Chapel Studios in Lincoln; The band made a series of video diaries ("InMedia") of their time in the studio. In February 2009 it was confirmed that InMe had finished recording the album and that it was ready for mixing and mastering.

A short UK tour was announced to commence in late April, leading many to believe that this is when the album was to be released around that time. Although the album was not released for another few months, several songs from the album were aired for the first time. These shows were the only shows to involve Ben Konstantinovic in a live setting and were InMe's first shows as a four piece.

On 6 April, InMe uploaded "Nova Armada", a new track from Herald Moth, to their MySpace. A day later, the band confirmed the album's final tracklist. It was also confirmed that the band would be uploading one song a month until the album's release, raising expectations that the album would be released in late August, along with a single to be released beforehand. The first of these tracks to be released on Myspace was "Nova Armada", followed by "The Art of Moderation", with "Belief Revival", "I Will Honour You" and "Ferocity in Desire" released in later months. After much speculation, the first single was announced as "Single of the Weak" which was released on August 17, a week later than intended, with Greg McPherson confirming this via the band's official forums.

On 29 June 2009, the band released the album's artwork via their MySpace, as well as setting a provisional release date of 31 August. Herald Moth was eventually released on 14 September through Graphite Records. It reached #68 in the UK chart.

The second single from the album, a double A side featuring "All Terrain Vehicle" and "Nova Armada" was released in June 2010 with an accompanying video for "Nova Armada".

== Style ==
Herald Moth continues where Daydream Anonymous left off in that most of its songs contain technical riffing blended with clean melodic vocal lines. The album is much heavier than its predecessors, with some of the riffing being directly mathcore influenced (such as that in "Master Storm") whereas other riffs resemble heavier chugging breakdowns. Most of the songs feature finger tapping, a hallmark of former lead Guitarist Ben Konstantinovic who is a skilled airtapper and solo acoustic artist. Further to this songs such as "Captain Killjoy" and "The Art of Moderation" feature lengthy shredding style guitar solos, another new addition to the band's sound.

== Track listing ==
All songs written by Dave McPherson and InMe

1. "You Won't Hear from Me Again" – 4:56
2. "Belief Revival" – 3:49
3. "Nova Armada" – 4:09
4. "All Terrain Vehicle" – 3:46
5. "Captain Killjoy" – 4:22
6. "The Art of Moderation" – 4:48
7. "Single of the Weak" – 3:46
8. "Ferocity in Desire" – 3:54
9. "Happy to Disappoint You" – 5:01
10. "I Will Honour You" – 4:36
11. "A Mouthful of Loose Teeth" – 4:40
12. "Master Storm" – 5:41
13. "Love's Heartless Jest" – 3:33 [Limited Edition]
14. "Secret Tragic Fiction" – 4:19 [Limited Edition]
15. "Far-Reaching" (Live Acoustic Version) – 3:49 [iTunes Edition]

== Personnel ==
=== Band ===
- Dave McPherson – vocals, guitar
- Ben Konstantinovic – lead guitar
- Greg McPherson – bass guitar
- Simon Taylor – drums, percussion

Ben Konstantinovic and InMe amicably parted ways during the touring period of the album and was replaced by Gary Marlow (formerly of Dry Rise) in February 2010.

== Other songs from the Herald Moth sessions ==
In addition to the two bonus tracks found on the limited edition versions of Herald Moth, two more songs were recorded in the sessions for the album. The first of which is "Let's Go To War Baby" which appeared as a B side to "Single of the Weak".

"Ophion Luteus" is a further B side recorded during the Herald Moth sessions that InMe gave away as a free download exclusively on Christmas Day 2009. The song is short and almost instrumental. By mistake, two versions were released. One with verse and chorus vocals and one with just a sung chorus, the verses being left instrumental. This version is also slightly longer. The band members switched instruments in order to record this song. They lined up as follows:

- Greg McPherson (normally on bass) – guitar
- Simon Taylor (normally on drums) – bass
- Dave McPherson (normally on vocals/guitars) – drums/vocals
- Ben Konstantinovic (normally on lead guitar) – guitar

It was later revealed that most of the guitars on the track were done by Greg, with Ben contributing only the melodic outro solo.
