= White butterfly =

White butterfly may refer to:

Biology

- Pierinae, a subfamily of butterflies commonly called the whites
- Pieris, a genus of Pierinae commonly called the whites or garden whites
- Appias, another genus of Pierinae sometimes called the whites
- Pontia, a third genus of Pierinae sometimes called the whites
- Pieris rapae, a species also called the small white or small cabbage white

Culture

- White Butterfly (album), the second album from English rock band InMe
- Safe in a Room/White Butterfly, an EP from English rock band InMe
- White Butterfly (novel), an "Easy Rawlins" detective mystery novel by Walter Mosley
