= Behind the Bright Lights =

Behind The Bright Lights
- Cover art

Studio album by Fei Comodo
- Released: July 16, 2012
- Recorded: June 2009 – October 2011
- Genre: Melodic metalcore, post-hardcore
- Length: 45:16
- Label: Small Town Records

Fei Comodo chronology
They All Have Two Faces (2008)	Behind The Bright Lights (2012)

Singles from Behind The Bright Lights
- 1. "The Air Is Cold Tonight" Released: 18 June 2012; 2. "A Different World" Released: 9 July 2012

Professional ratings
Review scores
Source	Rating
Hit the Floor	9/10
Planet Loud	7/10

Behind The Bright Lights is the second and final studio album by metalcore band Fei Comodo. It was released on July 16, 2012, although it was originally due to be released on 14 May 2012. A special edition of the album was also released which contained bonus material, including acoustic performances, guitar tutorials and two music videos, alongside the album tracks. Two of the tracks on the album, "No Way Out" and "A Man Left Behind", had previously been released on the EP, The Life They Lead.

== Background ==
Following the release of their first mini-album They All Have Two Faces, the band wanted to act quickly and get a full album out within a year. After touring in support of their first album they got together in September 2009 to start recording their next album. However things didn't go as planned and it would be almost a further three years before the album would be released. During the intermediate period, Fei Comodo released an EP, The Life They Lead, which included two tracks, "No Way Out" and "A Man Left Behind", which would later feature on Behind The Bright Lights.

During this time the band members started pursuing other musical ventures, and by the time "Behind The Bright Lights" was ready for release, the band announced their separation due to no longer being the same people they were when they recorded the music.

== PledgeMusic Project ==
On 17 February 2012 Fei Comodo announced that they were intending to release a special edition of Behind The Bright Lights and were running a project using PledgeMusic, a crowd funding website, in order to do so. By receiving pre-orders of the album through the site, the band was able to generate the required capital to produce the special edition - an example of fan-funded music. Fans were also able to purchase a variety of other exclusive content through the site, such as signed set lists, guitar lessons and private acoustic performances by the band. As an extra incentive, the band posted studio updates and released certain material early to fans who pre-ordered the album.

Behind The Bright Lights was released two weeks before the official release date, via download, to fans who had 'pledged' to the album.

== Supporting tour ==
The band went out during the summer of 2012 to play a series of final shows after the release of Behind The Bright Lights, with support coming from I Divide, Evarose and Paige. Drummer Rob Clemson was not able to perform due to injuries suffered on a previous tour, but he did appear at the London show to sing his vocal parts on the track "A Different World" from the album.

== Track listing ==
No.	Title	Length
1.	"The Night Falls"	3:24
2.	"No Way Out"	3:40
3.	"A Different World"	3:53
4.	"The Point of No Return"	4:03
5.	"A Man Left Behind"	3:50
6.	"The Air is Cold Tonight"	3:57
7.	"You Peaked At Sixteen"	3:06
8.	"Interlude"	2:29
9.	"This Is What We Live For"	3:51
10.	"On the Road"	3:45
11.	"Walk With Me"	4:10
12.	"Barriers"	5:11

Behind The Bright Lights Special Edition - Disc 2
No.	Title	Length
13.	"Break The Ice" (live studio session)
14.	"A Different World" (live studio session)
15.	"The Point of No Return" (live studio session)
16.	"A Man Left Behind" (live studio session)
17.	"Break The Ice" (live acoustic)
18.	"Rival Tides" (live acoustic)
19.	"The Air Is Cold Tonight" (live acoustic)
20.	"Welcome Home" (cover)
21.	"Poison Pill" (pre-production demo)
22.	"Break The Ice" (live studio session video)
23.	"A Different World" (live studio session video)
24.	"The Point of No Return" (live studio session video)
25.	"A Man Left Behind" (live studio session video)
26.	"The Air Is Cold Tonight (music video)" (music video)
27.	"A Different World" (music video)
28.	"The Air Is Cold Tonight" (making of the music video)
29.	"Rival Tides" (guitar tutorial)
30.	"The Point of No Return" (guitar tutorial)
31.	"The Air Is Cold Tonight" (live acoustic video)
32.	"Rival Tides" (live acoustic video)
33.	"Break The Ice" (live acoustic video)

== Personnel ==
Fei Comodo

- Marc Halls - Vocals
- Will Phillipson - Guitar
- Mike Curtis - Guitar
- Rob Clemson - Drums
- Jay Styler - Bass
