= Cuba Cuba =

Welsh pop-rock band

Cuba Cuba are a Welsh pop-rock band from Cardiff, South Wales, formed in 2007.

They are currently signed to Walnut Tree Records and are part of the Escape Artist Management roster along with fellow Welsh band Tiger Please. Critics have often compared their sound to the likes of Bloc Party, Friendly Fires, The Killers, Minus The Bear and Phoenix.

They have enjoyed spot plays from BBC Radio 1 DJs Huw Stevens, Jen Long, Ally Mccrae and Bethan Elfyn as well as recording two Radio 1 Introducing live sessions in 2009 and 2011. The band have also enjoyed airtime on BBC Radio 1, BBC Radio 6, BBC Radio Wales, XFM, Nation Radio and many more outside of the UK. Tracks from their debut album have also been used on television programmes for the BBC, ITV, ESPN, S4C, WRU TV and CCFC TV. They have played support slots for such acts as Alice Cooper, Elton John, Lionel Richie, The Jackson 4, Friendly Fires, The Airborne Toxic Event, Joy Formidable, Funeral For A Friend, Lights, Funeral Party as well as playing prestigious festivals such as Reading and Leeds 2011, Swn 2011, Surfstock 2009 and In The City 2009.

In 2009, Cuba Cuba released their debut EP Tales from the Cabin, which received positive reviews from Rock Sound, Kerrang (3 out 5 rating) and Big Cheese magazines. Xtaster noted 'If they continue to build on their promising beginnings, Cuba Cuba stand every chance of being the latest Welsh export.' In 2010 their music video for track 'Icarus' reached No.4 in the Lava TV Top 20 Chart and No.5 in the Lava TV most requested chart. In May 2010 they released their debut single 'Home Is The Fire' which has featured as backing music to S4C's Heineken Cup Programmes, ITV's 'Captains Climb', ESPN Cricket and WRU TV.

Cuba Cuba spent the summer of 2010 finishing their debut album with producers Todd Campbell (Straight Lines, Tiger Please) and Tristan Ivemy (Frank Turner, The Holloways). The album was released on Walnut Tree Records on 27 June 2011 titled Where Else Is Safe But The Road?

The album has received positive reviews from the press so far. Alter The Press gave the album 9/10 noting that it was "an absolute triumph"

In the summer of 2011 Cuba Cuba played the BBC Introducing Stages at Reading and Leeds Festivals.

In late 2012, the band re-emerged with new material but, under the new guise of Safari Gold

== Band members ==
- Morgan Isaac – Lead vocals, guitar, keyboards, clarinet
- Danny Owen – keyboards, guitar, vocals, xylophone
- Sion Fenwick – guitar, vocals
- Michael McCabe – bass, vocals
- Lewys Isaac – drums, vocals

== Discography ==
- Tales From the Cabin 6 track EP (2009) via Smalltown Records
- "Home Is The Fire" 4 track Single (2010) via Walnut Tree Records
- Where Else Is Safe But The Road? 11 track album (2011) via Walnut Tree Records
