= The Hardship Diaries =

Studio album by Dave McPherson
- Released: 10 April 2011
- Recorded: May 2009 and September/October 2011
- Studio: CDS Studios
- Genre: Acoustic, folk, rock
- Label: Graphite Records / Northern Music
- Producer: Mike Curtis

The Hardship Diaries is the debut full-length solo release from InMe frontman Dave McPherson. The album was released on April 10, 2011, through PledgeMusic and Graphite Records.

The first and only single from the album was "Summer: She Puts Me In a Good Mood".

== Development of the album ==
The creation of the album began as early as 2008 and a provisional track list was made public in early 2009. The track list changed several times before the final version was confirmed in October 2010 through McPherson's official Facebook page. The album was initially intended to be released much earlier but was held back due to McPherson's commitments to InMe and other solo EP releases.

The album was funded through a PledgeMusic campaign, launched on 10 January 2011. The pledge reached its target within 48 hours of being launched and did so nearly four times over.

== Style ==
Compared to his technical electric guitar work in InMe, McPherson's sound on The Hardship Diaries is a much softer, stripped back acoustic experience combined with often orchestral arrangements. The songs are much akin to InMe's softer songs but outside of a band environment, with McPherson citing influences such as Loudon Wainwright III, Talk Talk, Frank Turner, City and Colour and Pink Floyd.

== Track listing ==
All songs written and performed by Dave McPherson.

1. "Spring: Hearts Need Blood"
2. "Is This All We Are?"
3. "Listen to the Music"
4. "Summer: She Puts Me In a Good Mood"
5. "Before I Even Had You"
6. "Love Rats"
7. "Autumn: A Ghostly Reprise"
8. "Hummingbird"
9. "Last Year"
10. "Winter: Hibernation"
11. "Obsession Is a Young Man's Game"
12. "This Is No Fairytale"

== Personnel ==
- Dave McPherson — vocals, guitar, programming and arrangements.
- Mike Curtis - production
