= Ruen Brothers =

Folk band from Scunthorpe, England

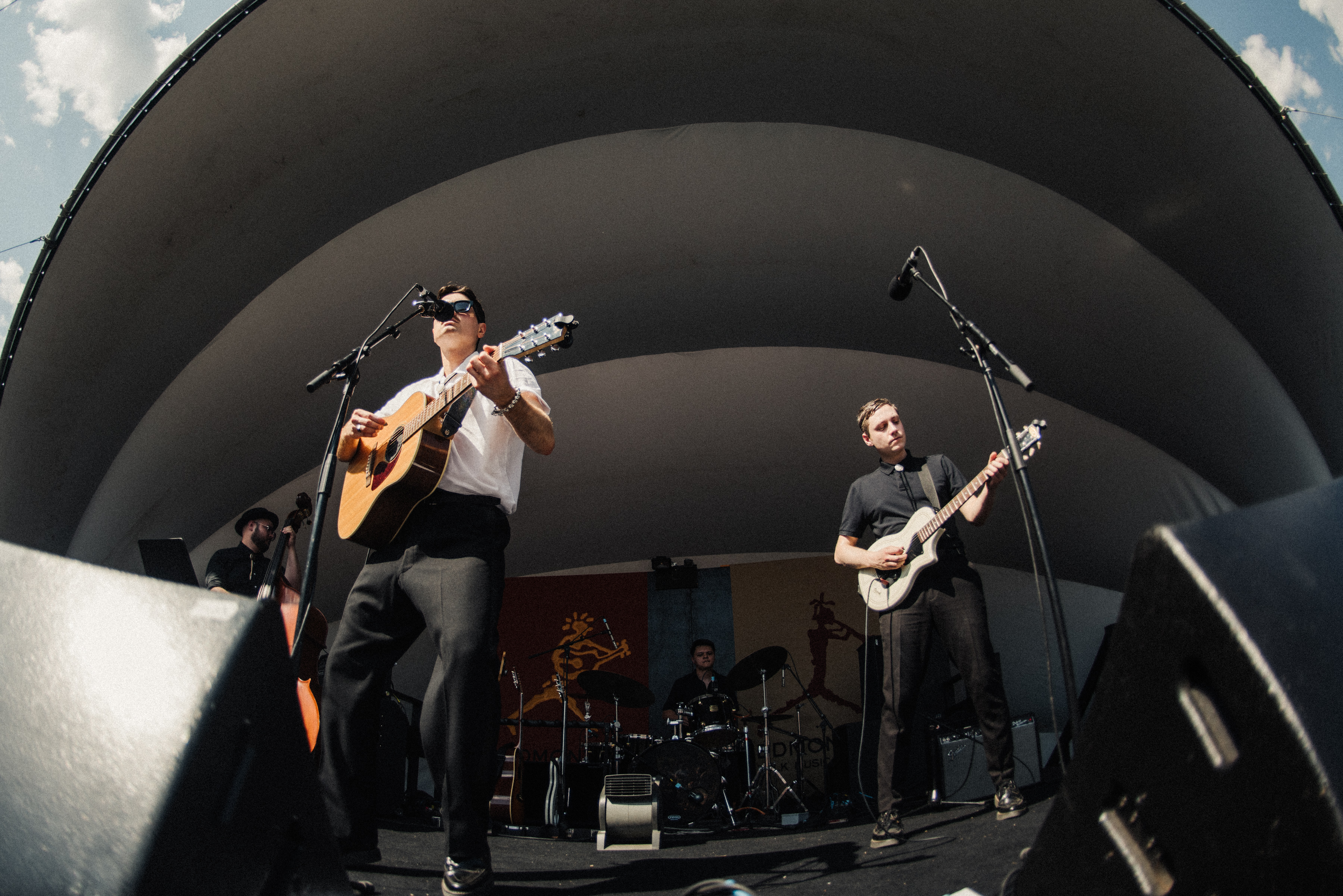
- Ruen Brothers in 2024

Background information
- Origin: Scunthorpe, England
- Genres: Country; Folk; Rock and roll; Alternative rock
- Years active: 2013–present
- Labels: Universal Republic, Ramseur Records, Yep Roc Records
- Members: Rupert Stansall; Henry Stansall
- Website: ruenbrothers.com

Ruen Brothers is a contemporary folk duo originally from Scunthorpe, England and consisting of brothers Henry Stansall (rhythm guitar, lead vocals) and Rupert Stansall (lead guitar, backing vocals, various instruments). The duo's name comes from mixing their first names. Ruen Brothers first rose to prominence in 2013 through the BBC Radio program BBC Music Introducing with their self-produced song "Aces".

Ruen Brothers' debut album All My Shades of Blue was released on Ramseur Records (courtesy of Universal Republic) on June 1, 2018. The album was produced by Rick Rubin and features Chad Smith of the Red Hot Chili Peppers on drums, Dave Keuning of The Killers on strings, and Ian McLagan of Faces/Small Faces on keys. It is the last record McLagan appeared on before his death in 2014.

Ruen Brothers' third album Ten Paces was released on Yep Roc Records on June 2, 2023, and charted on Billboard and radio throughout 2023 and was the No. 65 radio-charted Roots Rock Album of 2023 and the No. 45 radio-charted Roots Rock UK Album of 2023. Ten Paces was produced by Rupert Stansall who also produced their self-released second album Ultramodern in 2021.

Additionally, Ruen Brothers have written music for films including "Break the Rules" and "Lonesome" for Netflix's The Half of It in 2020, and "Up in California" for Blumhouse's Adopt a Highway in 2019.

Their music combines many genres, including folk, country, rock and roll, alternative rock and Americana, as well as influence from Westerns and film noir. They cite the Rolling Stones, The Who, Chuck Berry, Roy Orbison, the Everly Brothers, Al Green, Johnny Cash and Bobby Womack as musical influences.

Ruen Brothers are, as of 2024, based in Louisville, Kentucky.

== Discography ==
=== Studio albums ===
List of albums
Title	Details
All My Shades of Blue	Released: June 1, 2018; Label: Ramseur Records/Universal Republic; Producer: Rick Rubin; Formats: Digital download, streaming, CD, vinyl
Ultramodern	Released: October 21, 2021; Label: AWAL; Producer: Rupert Stansall; Formats: Digital download, streaming, CD
Ten Paces	Released: June 2, 2023; Label: Yep Roc Records; Producer: Rupert Stansall; Formats: Digital download, streaming, CD, vinyl
Awooo	Released: October 17, 2025; Label: Yep Roc Records; Producer: Rupert Stansall; Formats: Digital download, streaming, CD, vinyl

=== Extended plays ===
List of extended plays
Title	Details
Blood Runs Wild	Released: November 11, 2013; Label: Universal Republic; Formats: Digital download, streaming
Point Dume	Released: March 10, 2015; Label: Universal Republic; Formats: Digital download, streaming

== Singles ==
List of singles
Title	Year	Album
"Aces"	2015	All My Shades of Blue
"Unknown"	2016	Non-album single
"A Million Things"	2019	Ultramodern
"Lonesome"	2020	Non-album single
"Break the Rules"	2020	Non-album single
"Saving Me, Saving You / Alone"	2020	Ultramodern
"Takin' It Easy (Ru Demo Take)"	2020	Ultramodern
"Takin' It Easy"	2020	Ultramodern
"This Wholesome Christmas Eve"	2020	Non-album single
"Cookies & Cream"	2021	Ultramodern
"Don't Know What's Come Over You"	2022	Ten Paces
