= Ad Vanderveen =

Dutch musician

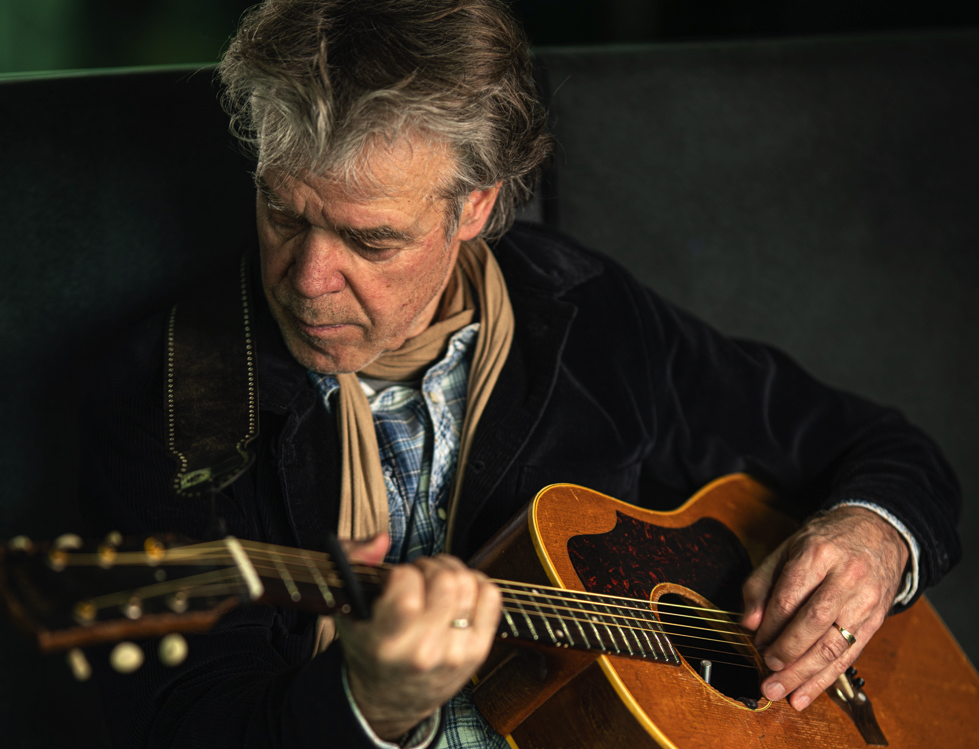
- Vanderveen playing guitar in 2022

Background information
- Born: Arend van der Veen; 1956 (age 69–70); Hilversum, Netherlands
- Genres: Roots, Americana
- Occupations: Musician; singer; songwriter; composer; producer
- Instruments: Vocals; guitar; harmonica; keyboards
- Years active: 1970–present
- Labels: Blue Rose Records, Sonic Rendezvous, Songsense Music
- Spouse(s): Kersten de Ligny, m. 2019
- Website: advanderveen.com

Ad Vanderveen (born September 21, 1956) is a Dutch songwriter, guitarist and singer who is active in the roots and Americana genres.

== Early life (1956–1980) ==
Arend van der Veen was born in Hilversum, Netherlands into a musical family with Canadian roots. His mother Sietske van der Ploeg played the church organ, his father Roel van der Veen played the accordion and piano. However, he was not allowed to play the guitar at home because his parents were generally not fond of the hippie culture of the late 1960s, which they associated with their son drinking beer and playing Rolling Stones songs in the cellar.

Nevertheless, he played in Rock and roll bands from the age of 14. The band Brinker, in which he played bass and sang, got a record deal and released two singles in 1977; Vanderveen co-wrote one song.

He was unable to make a living from music, however, and held various ordinary jobs until the age of 24. In an interview from 2021, Vanderveen said that writing and playing the guitar were a necessity for him and that he therefore – after initially resisting – also had to become a singer. Musically, Vanderveen was first influenced by the Rolling Stones, Beatles, Kinks and John Lee Hooker, later by Neil Young, Van Morrison, Bob Dylan, Guy Clark and Townes Van Zandt.

== Career ==
=== Career beginnings (1980–1992) ===
In 1980, Vanderveen formed his own band, The Cotton Brothers, which played country rock and featured him on bass and vocals. At this time, he also began performing his songs in public. The band toured the Netherlands and Germany for around three years before releasing their debut album On Strike in 1983 with a different line-up under the name Personnel; the recordings were made between 1981 and 1983. From the second album, Off The Record (1986), Vanderveen no longer played bass, but switched to guitar, which was his original instrument and better suited to accompanying his vocals. In the years that followed, he developed into a multi-instrumentalist.

With Vanderveen on bass and as a singer, Roberto Q & The Boppers released the album Backdoor in 1981.

In 1988, Vanderveen partnered up with Philip Kroonenberg and the band Personnel, now primarily a duo, changed its line-up. On tour in Basel, Switzerland, they discovered that there was a recording studio connected to the stage next door. This resulted in the live album Only (1990). Their second and last album together, Continuing Stories, was recorded in 1992 in Nashville, Tennessee, together with Al Kooper, Flaco Jimenez and Al Perkins. Some of Personnel's singles were regularly heard on the radio, but there was no great success. The band broke up in 1992.

=== Solo career and collaborative projects (since 1992) ===
In 1991 and 1992, Vanderveen was invited to perform a monthly night program for the Rock City show on Dutch radio station 3FM. This invitation led him to work solo and perform regularly at the folk club The String in Amsterdam, and parts of these programs were released as his first solo album, Travel Light, in 1993.

In the same year, Vanderveen met David Olney and immediately felt a connection that was mutual; several collaborations followed. Vanderveen said that he learned from David Olney – as in the world of classical music – and that his playing, singing, writing and performing was what he would want for himself. Vanderveen's album Only Olney, released in 2023, contains songs by Olney that Vanderveen feels fit him.

Vanderveen has released at least one new album almost every year since 1993, collaborating on some of them with international artists such as American singer-songwriters David Olney, Eliza Gilkyson and Iain Matthews, as well as Leland Sklar, Herman Brood, Eric Andersen and John Gorka.

The Canadian/American singer-songwriter Neil Young plays an important role in Vanderveen's repertoire. The Dutch Neil Young fan club had asked Vanderveen to take part in a fan club day to perform some of Neil Young's songs. The album Ad Vanderveen & The O'Neils was subsequently released in 1998. The name of the band refers to Neil Young.

Since 2005, Vanderveen has been working with Kersten de Ligny (vocals, autoharp, percussion); their voices harmonize and complement each other.

In 2017, Vanderveen performed with the band as Van Morrison's support act after Morrison did him the honor of inviting him personally. In an interview from 2021, Vanderveen said of this insight into Morrison's life that he would not envy him and would feel crushed by such a machinery.

In February 2022, Vanderveen's album Candle To You reached number 1 in the Euro Americana charts.

The same year saw a reunion of Vanderveen with The O'Neils – Kersten de Ligny, Timon van Heerdt (bass), Jan Erik Hoeve (pedal steel, banjo), Roel Overduin (drums). This led Vanderveen back to playing loud electric music, which he had considered a thing of the past. The collaboration resulted in the double album Heart of Every Town in 2023, a prime example of the frequent alternation between subdued and rocking tracks; the first side is based on acoustic guitar with church organ, recorded in a church, the second side is based on the same songs on electric guitar and garage band, recorded in a pub.

Vanderveen's records and performances have led to a modest international status among fans and fellow musicians. His concerts feature a mix of new songs and classics from his extensive repertoire.

Since 2023, Vanderveen has hosted one hour of music per week on the Dutch internet radio station 40UP Radio under the title Heartfelt & Handmade.

== Musical style ==
Some of Vanderveen's albums have a different instrument as a starting point - a church organ (Heart of Every Town), a mandolin or a mandola (Candle To You). In the latter case, he wrote the songs on the mandola, which was new to him at the time, and also led to new ideas and harmonies.

Vanderveen's lyrics are often autobiographical and deal with the everyday things in his life. His writing is always poetic, thoughtful, introspective, honest and open.

His musical styles of roots rock with country-folk and blues elements range from intimate acoustic songs as a solo artist to expressive and expansive electric improvisations with The O'Neils and everything in between.

Both his acoustic and electric guitar playing is often reminiscent of Neil Young, but cleaner and more technically polished.

== Reception ==
David Olney said of Vanderveen's music that it is of a remarkable honesty and humility, and that one has the feeling in his music of moving towards something deep and powerful.

Gerrit Schinkel commented on Rise In Love in Bluestown Music magazine in 2024 that Vanderveen would continue to deliver great albums with much to enjoy.

Marius Roeting wrote in New Folk Sounds magazine in 2023 that Vanderveen was perhaps the most creative and prolific singer-songwriter in the Americana folk scene.

Lee Zimmerman wrote in Goldmine magazine in 2023 that Vanderveen was one of his country's finest exports, a singer-songwriter with a keen sense of melody and melodic intent, and his songs were supple, soothing and rich with sentiment and honest emotion.

In 2020, Bert van Kessel told Altcountryforum magazine that it was, "amazing how Vanderveen would manage to maintain an unprecedentedly high level with this enormous output of albums."

Norbert Tebarts wrote in Written in Music magazine in 2011 that Vanderveen was one of the best musicians in the Netherlands, but also one of the most underrated.

== Personal life ==
Ad Vanderveen and Kersten de Ligny were married in 2019. They live in Bussum, Netherlands. Vanderveen has two sons and one grandchild.

Outside of music, Vanderveen devotes himself to meditation, walking, reading and generally trying to keep himself and his instruments in good condition.

Vanderveen supports the organization WISE, which specializes in educating the world about responsible energy sources.

== Discography ==
- Travel Light (the Rock City Sessions) (1993)
- Sooner Or Later (1994)
- Brandnew Everytime (1995)
- Wonders Of The World (1997)
- Ad Vanderveen & The O' Neils (1998)
- Here Now: Songs From The Basement (2000)
- The Iain Ad Venture (2000) with Iain Matthews
- More Than A Song (2001) with Iain Matthews and Eliza Gilkyson
- One On One (2001)
- The Moment That Matters (2003) with The O'Neils, Astrid Young, Iain Matthews, David Olney, Eliza Gilkyson
- Witness (2003) with Iain Matthews and Eliza Gilkyson
- Late Bloomer (2004)
- Fields Of Plenty (2005)
- Cloud Of Unknowing (2006)
- Soundcarrier (2007) Live in Eddie's Attic in Decatur (Atlanta)
- Still Now (2008)
- Faithful To Love (2009)
- Ride The Times (2010) with Iain Matthews
- Days Of The Greats (2011)
- Driven By A Dream (2012)
- Live At Crossroads (2013)
- Live Labor (2013)
- Beat The Record (2014)
- Presents Of The Past / Requests Revisited (2015)
- The Stellar Cellar Band (2016)
- Worlds within (2017)
- Denver Nevada (2018)
- I was Hank Williams (2018)
- Final Refuge (2019)
- Treasure Keepers (2020)
- Release (2021)
- Candle To You (2022)
- Live in Weimar ’22 (2022)
- Heart of Every Town (2023)
- Only Olney (2023)
- Samos Sessions & Golden Verses (2024)
- Rise In Love (2024)
- Camino Wayside (2025)
- Greetings from Grolloo (2025)
- Disappearing Act (2026)
