= The Pride (album) =

Studio album by InMe
- Released: 19 February 2012
- Recorded: June–October 2011
- Studio: CDS Studios
- Genre: Alternative rock, alternative metal, progressive rock
- Label: Graphite Records / Northern Music
- Producer: Mike Curtis

InMe chronology
Phoenix: The Best of InMe (2010)	The Pride (2012)	Trilogy: Dawn (2015)

Professional ratings
Review scores
Source	Rating
Media Essentials	5/5 stars
AbsolutePunk.net	3/5 stars

The Pride is the fifth studio album from the band InMe. It is the first full-length album of new material to feature lead guitarist Gazz Marlow. It was released via PledgeMusic on 19 February 2012. The album was awarded KKKK by Kerrang! and 8/10 by Rock Sound magazine, and described on Twitter as "magnificent" by XFMs Rich Walters.

== Development of the album ==
The development of the album started as early as 2009. Dave McPherson wrote a whole album's worth of material more in the vein of Herald Moth's technical metal style but scrapped all but two songs, which feature on the band's best of compilation.

The second wave of writing started in 2010 and continues through until mid-2011, with the track list gradually being built up. Songs such as "A Great Man" were finished earlier, whereas other tunes such as "Moonlit Seabed" were completed just prior to the final recording session in October 2011.

== Style ==
Having drawn a line under the technical metal trappings of 2009's Herald Moth, The Pride is said to take on a much more song based approach. Whilst there are still technical aspects, there is a greater focus on the songs rather than the progressive aspects of the band's music. The album is said to resemble both White Butterfly and Daydream Anonymous in terms of style and sound. Lyrically and Vocally, the album is more positive than Daydream Anonymous and Herald Moth, with soaring melodies conveying poetic lyrics.

== Track listing ==
All songs/lyrics written by Dave McPherson. All music by InMe.

1. Reverie Shores
2. Moonlit Seabed
3. A Great Man
4. Silver Womb
5. Pantheon
6. Escape to Mysteriopa
7. Guardian
8. Beautiful Sky Gardens
9. Halcyon Genesis
10. Legacy
11. You Had My Heart [iTunes Bonus Track Version]

== Personnel ==
=== Band ===
- Dave McPherson – vocals, guitar
- Gazz Marlow – lead guitar
- Greg McPherson – bass guitar
- Simon Taylor – drums, percussion
