= Tiger Please =

Welsh rock band

- Origin: Cardiff, Wales
- Genres: Alternative rock
- Years active: 2008–2012
- Labels: Walnut Tree Records
- Members: Leon Stanford; Tyla Campbell; Luc Morris; Lewis Rowsell; Jimmi Kendall
- Website: www.myspace.com/Tigerplease

Tiger Please is a Welsh indie / alternative rock five-piece band from Cardiff, Wales. The band formed in August 2008. The band's influences are U2, Sigur Rós, Kings of Leon, John Mayer and Counting Crows. They signed with Walnut Tree Records in 2009 and released their debut EP They Don't Change Under Moonlight. Kerrang! magazine, Rock Sound magazine, and Classic Rock magazine praised the EP and featured the band on the Rock Sound and Classic Rock cover-mount albums. The band toured with Kids In Glass Houses, InMe, Twin Atlantic and Funeral For A Friend.

During the summer of 2010, Tiger Please toured the United Kingdom and recorded a second EP called Seasons which was also critically acclaimed. They also played the Redbull tent at Download Festival in 2010 and the Jägermeister stage at Sonisphere Festival.

== Discography ==
=== EPs ===
- They Don't Change Under Moonlight (Walnut Tree Records, 2009)
- Seasons (Walnut Tree Records, (2010)
