= Mighty Moshin' Emo Rangers =

- Created by: Chris Phillips, Nick Pittom
- Starring: Ross Fretten; Stephanie Braithwaite; Victoria Godby; John Penn; Luke Markey; Fai Burnett; Paul Garson; Luke Cole; Kathryn Alder; Laura Bradley; Georgina Fox; Thanda Mutero; Kyle Johnson; Chris Peel
- Country of origin: United Kingdom
- No. of seasons: 2
- No. of episodes: 9

Production
- Running time: 5 minutes

Original release
- Network: MTV UK
- Release: 2005 – 2015

Mighty Moshin' Emo Rangers is a television miniseries on MTV UK. The show was a parody of Mighty Morphin Power Rangers, satirizing the emo stereotype. The series was directed by Chris Phillips and Nick Pittom, both from Essex, England. It was picked up by MTV UK in 2006, and later also appeared on MTV in the United States. A second series began in 2010, followed by a special in 2015.

== Production history ==
The creators have cited two conflicting stories for the original idea for the series:

1. One story suggests that in November 2004, Phillips was upset due to a breakup with his girlfriend. Pittom told him to "Quit being emo, you Emo Ranger!" to which Phillips replied with "You Mighty Moshin' Emo Rangers!"
2. Another version comes from an interview with Phillips:

"I was sitting at my computer chatting to a friend, Pat. Pat sent me a picture of him dressed as a ninja leaping across a recording studio, and I said 'you look like an emo ranger'. I sat there for a few minutes and thought 'that sounds kind of funny' and then just heard in my head the term 'Mighty Moshin' Emo Ranger'. The more I thought about the name the more I was convinced there should be a show called Mighty Moshin' Emo Rangers, but there wasn't, which was annoying, 'cos I wanted to watch it."

The show was filmed on location in the producers' home town of Chelmsford, Essex. Sound design was by Dominic Sinacola, who lived in Southampton. The show's theme song was performed by local Essex post-hardcore band Fei Comodo. Starting out as a fan-film project distributed on YouTube, Google Video and Myspace, the show was picked up by MTV UK in 2006, and later also appeared on MTV in the United States.

The Emo Rangers logo for Season 2

A second season of Emo Rangers was announced in 2006, but was halted for undisclosed reasons. It finally premiered on 12 July 2010. The first episode, "Weed Better Sober Up" parodied the "Return of the Green Ranger" saga from Power Rangers. The second season had improved effects, and six episodes rather than three. The episodes were also mostly standalone.

Phillips and Pittom stated they wished to release a DVD of the show.

== Cast ==
=== Rangers ===
- Ross Fretten as Ross, the Introspective White Emo Ranger.
- Luke Matthew Markey as Luke, the Chaos Mohawk Red Emo Ranger.
- Stef Braithwaite as Stef, the Bleeding Heart Pink Emo Ranger.
- John Penn as John, the original Chronic Stoner Green Emo Ranger, later the StraightxEdge Blue Emo Ranger.
- Vicki Godby (née Symes) as Vicken, the Weeping Tears Yellow Emo Ranger.
- Fai Burnett (née Archer) as Fai, the FashionxCore Purple Emo Ranger.
- Krystal Moore as Mary Jane Greenfield, a new Chronic Stoner Ranger (2015-).
- Luke Cole as Captain Emohead, a floating emo stereotype head of unknown origin. This character is a parody of Zordon.

== Episodes ==
=== Season 1 ===
Overall #	In-season #	Title	Original release date	Focused-on characters
0	0	Mighty Moshin' Emo Rangers (2005 short film)	27 October 2005	Captain Emohead, Ross, John, Luke, Vicken, Stef, Evil Empress, Colonel Crusher, Hoodie Patrol, Emo 5
Evil Empress crashes on the moon and uses her powers to create a palace. She sends Colonel Crusher to destroy Chelmsford. This triggers the emo sensors, awakening Captain Emohead. He responds to her threat by summoning five depressed teens to become the Emo Rangers.
1	1	Beware the Funky Monkey	November 2005	Ross, Funky Monkey
Wishing to conserve her power more, the Evil Empress sends one of her weakest minions: Funky Monkey. He attacks a traveling carnival, and turns a few teens there into members of the dreaded Hoodie Patrol. However, the monkey grossly underestimates what Ross can do.
2	2	A Fashionable Choice	November 2005	Stef, Luke, Fai
The Empress sends a generic evil robot to avenge Colonel Crusher, expending a considerable amount of her energy doing so. This robot proves too powerful for the five base Emo Zords, so Captain Emohead recruits Fai to become a new Ranger and give the Rangers a fighting chance.
3	3	Emo Rangers vs. Santa (Emo Rangers Christmas Special)	December 2005	Luke, Evil Santa, Panic! at the Disco, Santa Hat Hoodie Patrol
The Empress plots to ruin Christmas by using a TV show host who is secretly one of her minions to turn a mall Santa into a monster. The plan succeeds, and the new evil Santa is even given his own Santa bot. When this proves too powerful for the Emo Rangers, Captain Emohead turns to Panic! at the Disco for assistance.

=== Season 2 ===
Overall #	In-season #	Title	Original release date	Focused-on characters
4	1	Weed Better Sober Up	10 July 2010 (YouTube); 12 July 2010 (MTV)	John, Evil Chronic Stoner
When John's body begins having severe negative reactions, he decides to give up marijuana and adopt a Straight Edge lifestyle. The Empress responds by creating her own knockoff of the Chronic Stoner Ranger powers, forcing John to have to literally fight off his old habits.
5	2	Bearly Legal	19 July 2010	Vicken, Mr. Fluffy
Finally fed up with Vicken and her love of teddy bears, the Empress turns Mr. Fluffy into a homicidal maniac of a monster. She also turns several other teddy bears from a charity into Fluffy's minions. They quickly begin a reign of terror in Chelmsford, forcing Vicken to have to give up her childhood hobby to save the day. Note: For its MTV-US release, this episode was titled "Scare Bear."
6	3	Top of the Flops	26 July 2010	Ross, Sold Ya' Kid, Avril Bot
With the magic she needs for conquest of Earth drying up and the need to flee coming soon, the Empress decides to change her tactics slightly by using Sold Ya' Kid to scam children out of the money she'd need to conquer the world a different way. However, Captain Emohead and Ross get wise to the scam and fight back. Sold Ya' is outraged, and summons aid from a robot that looks like Avril Lavigne to finish the Rangers off.
7	4	Rave New World	2 August 2010	Luke, New Rave Pirates
After some time has gone by, it is assumed the Empress gave up and fled to wherever she came from. The dreaded New Rave Pirates arrive on Earth with an even more cynical and sinister plan than any the Empress came up with. Luke wastes no time springing into action against them. Fai warns the other Rangers to get ready, in case the Pirates have their own giant robot - which they do.
8	5	You Want Cries With That?	9 August 2010	Fai, Burger Clown
Fai discovers a nasty monster left behind when the Empress fled, who has his own version of the Hoodie Patrol. This nasty clown hides a booster for his own powers inside of one of the restaurants to which he is both the owner and mascot. Fai also learns that Burger Clown's patties are actually made of human children, and evil alien magic. Those who eat the burgers quickly gain weight rapidly. Tired of her interference, Burger Clown sends giant sized robots shaped like an extra value meal to deal with Fai. The other Rangers have to get creative with their Fight Bots to defeat the menaces, while Fai takes out the restaurants.
9	6	Uncle Kuddles and Fiddles the Kid	16 August 2010	Stef, Uncle Kuddles, Fiddles the Kid
A mutated pedophile uses Stef's reckless online dating habits against her, and tries to lure her into a trap. However, he is too obsessed with what he wants to realize that she's a Ranger - and that she has friends with dangerous weapons willing to kill him in a heartbeat!

=== 2015 Special ===
A final film was made as a series finale in 2015, when it became obvious that there would be no feasible way to bring the cast in long-term to make more episodes nor the feature-length film they initially planned to make. On 20 June 2014 the Emo Rangers Facebook Page announced that they wanted to film a movie using a $5,000,000 budget at Shepperton Studios. No further information was released about that film as of July 2015. The 31 October 2015 release of the anniversary special suggests that MTV dropped Emo Rangers, forcing the cast and crew to improvise on a much smaller budget.

Overall #	Title	Original release date	Focused-on characters
10	Emo Rangers 2015 Anniversary Special	31 October 2015	Mary Jane, Evil Principal, Mysterious Vagrant, Upgraded Hoodie Patrol
Mary Jane Greenfield heads to Happy Valley High for her education at the behest of her mother - who has been fooled by the Evil Principal. It doesn't take Mary Jane long to learn the sinister truth about the seemingly rules-obsessed principal: he's an evil alien wanting to drug the kids and turn them into his own Hoodie Patrol! With nearly five years of almost zero alien activity until now, the other Rangers have gone into retirement. However, a Mysterious Vagrant notices what is going on and gives Mary Jane a key to the secret locker wherein which Captain Emohead hid the Chronic Stoner Ranger powers. This triggers the emo sensors, awakening Captain Emohead...who must guide Mary Jane on how to be a new Chronic Stoner Ranger. The principal fires back with a giant robot, convincing Captain Emohead to call the other Rangers out of retirement for one final battle.
