= Trilogy: Dawn =

Studio album by InMe
- Released: 4 May 2015
- Genre: Alternative rock
- Length: 36:24
- Producer: Mike Curtis

InMe chronology
| The Pride (2012) | Trilogy: Dawn (2015) | Jumpstart Hope (2020) |

Singles from Trilogy: Dawn
- 1. "Hymn: Ivory Elder" Released: 2015-03-23; 2. "Rapture: Land of the Secret Rose" Released: 2015-07-29; 3. "Amnesty: Bonsai Forest" Released: 2015-10-01

Professional ratings
Review scores
| Source | Rating |
|---|---|
| Pure Rawk | 4.5/5 stars |

Trilogy: Dawn is the sixth studio album from British alternative rock band InMe. The album was released in the UK on 4 May 2015 and was the first instalment of three albums in a trilogy. However, the second instalment, Trilogy: Sentience, as well as the third and final instalment, Trilogy: Quietus were never released. On 2 November 2018, InMe announced they would rather focus on their new album Jumpstart Hope and not on the second and third trilogy albums. This would also be the final album to feature Simon Taylor, before his departure from the band in October 2017.

A video for the song Hymn: Ivory Elder, was released on the band's YouTube page on 23 March 2015. After the album's release, the band also made two more videos for Rapture: Land of the Secret Rose and Amnesty: Bonsai Forest using footage recorded from the Trilogy: Dawn UK Tour. The videos appeared on the band's YouTube page on 29 July 2015 and 1 October 2015 respectively.

== The Trilogy ==
Frontman Dave McPherson states that the original idea to release three thematically linked albums struck him during the recording of the band's 5th album, The Pride, in 2011. Each album will have a different sound and theme. Trilogy: Dawn deals with the concept of birth, youth and childhood and is an alternative rock album.

== Track listing ==
All lyrics are written by Dave McPherson; all music is composed by InMe

| No. | Title | Length |
|---|---|---|
| 1. | "Creation: Amethyst" | 3:28 |
| 2. | "Beloved: Seraphia, Seraphia" | 3:47 |
| 3. | "Trauma: Door Slam Crescendo" (Strings by Alex Davies) | 4:01 |
| 4. | "Loss: Children of Exile" | 4:00 |
| 5. | "Rapture: Land of the Secret Rose" | 4:09 |
| 6. | "Amnesty: Bonsai Forest" | 3:46 |
| 7. | "Chrysalis: Lone Dance in an Empty Train Carriage" | 3:29 |
| 8. | "Hymn: Ivory Elder" | 3:12 |
| 9. | "Kindred: For All One Knows" | 3:49 |
| 10. | "Reverie: Aquarium" | 4:03 |
| Total length: | | 37:44 |

== Personnel ==
Credits are adapted from the album's liner notes.

=== InMe ===
- Dave McPherson - Vocals, guitars, programming
- Greg McPherson - Bass, programming
- Si Taylor - Drums, programming
- Gazz Marlow - Guitars

=== Additional performers ===
- Alex Davies - Strings on Trauma: Door Slam Crescendo

=== Production ===
- Produced, mixed and mastered by Mike Curtis at CDS Studios
- Press by Jamie Otsa at Wall of Sound PR
- Live bookings by Ian Shaw at TKO Booking Agency
- Publishing by AMF Publishing

=== Packaging ===
- Artwork and layout by Jim Vickers
- Photography by Dan Eden
