= We All Need a Reason to Believe =

Studio album by Valencia
- Released: August 26, 2008
- Genre: Pop punk, alternative rock
- Length: 38:28
- Label: Columbia
- Producer: Ariel Rechtshaid

Valencia chronology
This Could Be a Possibility (2005)	We All Need a Reason to Believe (2008)	Dancing with a Ghost (2010)

Professional ratings
Review scores
Source	Rating
AbsolutePunk	89%
Alternative Press	4/5 stars
Melodic	3.5/5 stars

We All Need a Reason to Believe is the second studio album by American pop punk band Valencia. It was produced by Ariel Rechtshaid, who has done projects for We Are Scientists and Plain White T's. An early review from AbsolutePunk writer Drew Beringer stated the release proved Valencia is "a band that can breathe new life into pop-punk".

The album title comes from lyrics in the second track, "Holiday".

== Release ==
In early April 2008, the band appeared at the Bamboozle Left festival. On April 8, the band posted a rough mix of "Holiday" online. It was mentioned that the track would feature on the band's next album, which was planned for release in late summer/early fall. On June 14, 2008, We All Need a Reason to Believe was announced for release in two months' time; alongside this, the track listing was posted online. In June and July 2008, the band appeared on the Warped Tour and supported All Time Low on their headlining US tour. We All Need a Reason to Believe was made available for streaming on August 19 through the band's Myspace profile, before being released on August 26 through major label Columbia Records. The band toured the US with Sing It Loud in August and September 2008. In October and November, the band supported Bayside on their headlining US tour. On November 21, the band released a music video for "Where Did You Go?". In January and February 2009, the band went on a headlining tour of the US with support from Houston Calls. In February and March, the band toured Australia as part of the Soundwave festival. On April 30, a music video was released for "The Good Life". The band appeared at The Bamboozle festival in early May. Between late June and late August, the band performed on the Warped Tour.

== Track listing ==
1. "Better Be Prepared" — 3:09
2. "Holiday" — 2:58
3. "Where Did You Go?" (featuring Rachel Minton of Zolof the Rock & Roll Destroyer) — 3:21
4. "Head in Hands" — 2:56
5. "Carry On" — 3:41
6. "All at Once" — 3:27
7. "Safe to Say" — 3:21
8. "Listen Up" (featuring Kenny Vasoli of The Starting Line) — 3:39
9. "I Can't See Myself" — 3:39
10. "The Good Life" — 4:02
11. "Free" — 4:18

=== Bonus track ===
1. "Running Away" – 3:30

=== We All Need a Reason to B-Side ===
1. "When Words Fail, This Music Speaks" — 2:41
2. "Working" — 2:32
3. "Running Away" — 3:33
4. "A Better Place to Land" — 3:26

== Personnel ==
- Shane Henderson — vocals
- JD Perry — guitar
- Maxim Soria — drums
- George Ciukurescu — bass
- Brendan Walter — guitar
- Kenny Vasoli (The Starting Line) — guest vocals on "Listen Up"
- Rachel Minton (Zolof the Rock & Roll Destroyer) — guest vocals on "Where Did You Go?"
- Dana Nielsen — engineer
