= Dancing with a Ghost =

Studio album by Valencia
- Released: October 12, 2010
- Recorded: April–May 2010
- Genre: Alternative rock, pop punk
- Length: 41:45
- Label: I Surrender
- Producer: Mark Trombino, Carlos De La Garza

Valencia chronology
We All Need a Reason to Believe (2008)	Dancing with a Ghost (2010)

Professional ratings
Review scores
Source	Rating
Melodic	3.5/5 stars

Dancing with a Ghost is the third full-length studio album by American pop punk band Valencia, released through I Surrender Records on October 12, 2010.

After releasing a single album on major label Columbia Records, We All Need a Reason to Believe in 2008, Valencia re-signed with their former independent label I Surrender Records in early 2010. The band has said they changed back because they liked having "control over everything" and "were hoping to go to some place smaller again", additionally, their contract at Columbia was over a period of time which had come to an end. Around this time, Valencia's original drummer Maxim Soria also left the band. He was replaced by Daniel Pawlovich - who had taught Soria how to play the drums in a band years prior.

Soon after, they announced that they were recording their third album with producers Mark Trombino (Blink 182, Jimmy Eat World) and Carlos De La Garza (Alkaline Trio, Neon Trees). During the recording process, April and May 2010, fans could access live video of the album's production with online streaming at UStream. The band revealed the album title (Dancing with a Ghost) and release date (October 12, 2010) in August 2010, by uploading a sequence of photos of them with a whiteboard. On August 30, 2010 the track listing was made public along with a teaser video.

Prior to the album's release, five pre-orders were made available. Each being presented with a different package, they were released by the I Surrender Records Merch Store, Glamour Kills, Interpunk, iTunes and FYE. In September 2010, the band posted a music video for the title track, "Dancing with a Ghost". The video used clips from the 1990 Patrick Swayze and Demi Moore film, Ghost. In September 2011, the group supported The Wonder Years on their headlining UK tour, dubbed A Whole Year in Airports.

== Track listing ==
No.	Title	Length
1.	"Dancing with a Ghost"	3:25
2.	"Spinning Out"	4:04
3.	"Still Need You Around (Lost Without You)"	3:54
4.	"Consider Me Dead"	3:36
5.	"Losing Sleep"	3:35
6.	"Friday Night"	3:24
7.	"Somewhere I Belong"	3:58
8.	"Days Go By"	3:25
9.	"The Way"	3:34
10.	"Stop Searching"	3:32
11.	"Pieces"	5:18
12.	"Airwaves" (Bonus Track)	3:35
13.	"Wake Up" (Japanese Bonus Track)	3:29

== Personnel ==
- Shane Henderson — vocals
- JD Perry — guitar
- Daniel Pawlovich — drums
- George Ciukurescu — bass
- Brendan Walter — guitar
- Simon Wilcox — vocals on Somewhere I Belong
