= Seasons (EP) =

EP by Tiger Please
- Released: (United Kingdom) 31 March 2010
- Genre: Alternative Rock
- Length: 17:26
- Label: Walnut Tree
- Producer: Romesh Dodangoda

Tiger Please chronology
They Don't Change Under Moonlight (2009)	Seasons (2010)

Professional ratings
Review scores
Source	Rating
Alter The Press!	4.5/5 stars
Punktastic	4.5/5 stars
sputnikmusic	4/5 stars

Seasons is the final EP from the alternative rock band Tiger Please. A five-track EP recorded and released 2010. Music videos for "Autumn Came the Fall" and "Spring & Its Offering" were released.

== Track listing ==
All music is composed by Tiger Please

No.	Title	Length
1.	"Seasons"	0:46
2.	"Summer In The House Of Confessions"	3:50
3.	"Autumn Came The Fall"	4:42
4.	"Winter & The Storyteller"	3:37
5.	"Spring & Its Offering"	4:35
Total length:		17:26

== Personnel ==
Tiger Please

- Leon Stanford – Vocals
- Tyla Campbell – Guitars
- Luc Morris - Guitars
- Jimmi Kendall - Bass
- Lewis Rowsell – Drums
