= Fei Comodo =

British post-hardcore band

- Origin: Essex, England
- Genres: Post-hardcore, metalcore
- Years active: 2003–2012
- Labels: Small Town Records
- Members: Marc Halls; Will Phillipson; Mike Curtis; Jay Styler; Rob Clemson
- Past members: Phil Walker; Richard Duvale
- Website: Official website

Fei Comodo were an English five-piece post-hardcore band from Essex, England. They were signed to Small Town Records and developed a strong fanbase since their formation through playing many live shows across the country. They released five EPs, two singles, and one studio mini album. Renowned for an energetic live show the band completed several UK tours with other hardcore and metalcore bands from the South East, such as InMe and Bury Tomorrow.

On 3 May 2012, the band announced they would be disbanding following the release of Behind the Bright Lights and subsequent tour.

== History ==
=== Formation and early years ===
Fei Comodo formed in May 2003 with an original line-up consisting of Marc Halls (vocals and guitar), Will Phillipson (guitar), Phil Walker (bass) and Richard Duvale (drums). After a series of line up changes, they finally recruited their current line up with Mike Curtis (guitar) being added and bass being inherited by Jay Styler and drums by Rob Clemson.

During this period, the band released four EPs, Fei Comodo, One Man Stands Alive, This One's for Us and Go, Go! Emo Rangers. One of their first gigs was at the infamous 'Whoopfest' event in the New Windmill Hall in Upminster. In September 2007, Fei Comodo toured as support for fellow Essex band InMe.

=== They All Have Two Faces (2008–2011) ===
In September 2008, they released a mini-album titled They All Have Two Faces. Following that the band supported Blessed by a Broken Heart in December 2008 and embarked on a headline tour in February/March 2009 to promote the mini-album.

In 2009, the band landed a spot playing on the third stage in the Red Bull tent at Download Festival and in October, Fei Comodo played Freestyle Festival as one of the headlining bands on the main stage alongside CKY. The band were nominated for 'Best British Newcomer' at the Kerrang! Awards 2009. In 2010, Fei Comodo performed at Sonisphere.

=== The Life They Lead (2011–2012) ===
In May 2011, the band released a new 4-track EP, The Life They Lead. In support of this release, Fei Comodo supported Exit Ten on their UK tour.

=== Behind the Bright Lights (2012) ===
The release of Behind the Bright Lights, the band's debut full-length album, was initially scheduled for May 2012. However, on 3 May 2012, the band announced that they would be splitting up and the album release date would be postponed until July 2012. The band had been running a project on PledgeMusic which allowed fans to purchase a special edition of Behind the Bright Lights. This project was extended after the announcement of the band's split. Two singles were released from the album, namely "The Air Is Cold Tonight" and "A Different World", and music videos were recorded for both of these tracks.

Fei Comodo played their final shows after the release of the album in the summer of 2012, supported by Paige, Evarose and I Divide.

=== Hey Vanity ===
After the break-up of the band, Marc Halls, Will Phillipson and Ash Clarke formed a new band along with bassist Tom Pullen.

== Discography ==
=== Studio albums ===
- They All Have Two Faces (2008)
- Behind the Bright Lights (2012)

=== EPs ===
- Fei Comodo EP (2003)
- One Man Stands Alive EP (2004)
- This One's For Us EP (2005)
- Go, Go! Emo Rangers EP (2006)
- The Life They Lead (2011)

=== Singles ===
- "Break the Ice" (2008)
- "Behind Bars" (2009)
- "The Air Is Cold Tonight" (2012)
- "A Different World" (2012)

== Members ==
- Marc Halls – Vocals
- Will Phillipson – Guitar
- Mike Curtis – Guitar
- Jay Styler – Bass
- Rob Clemson – Drums

== In media ==
Fei Comodo are most commonly cited for providing the theme tune for the popular MTV UK show, Mighty Moshin' Emo Rangers.
