= TuskHead =

Dutch singer-songwriter

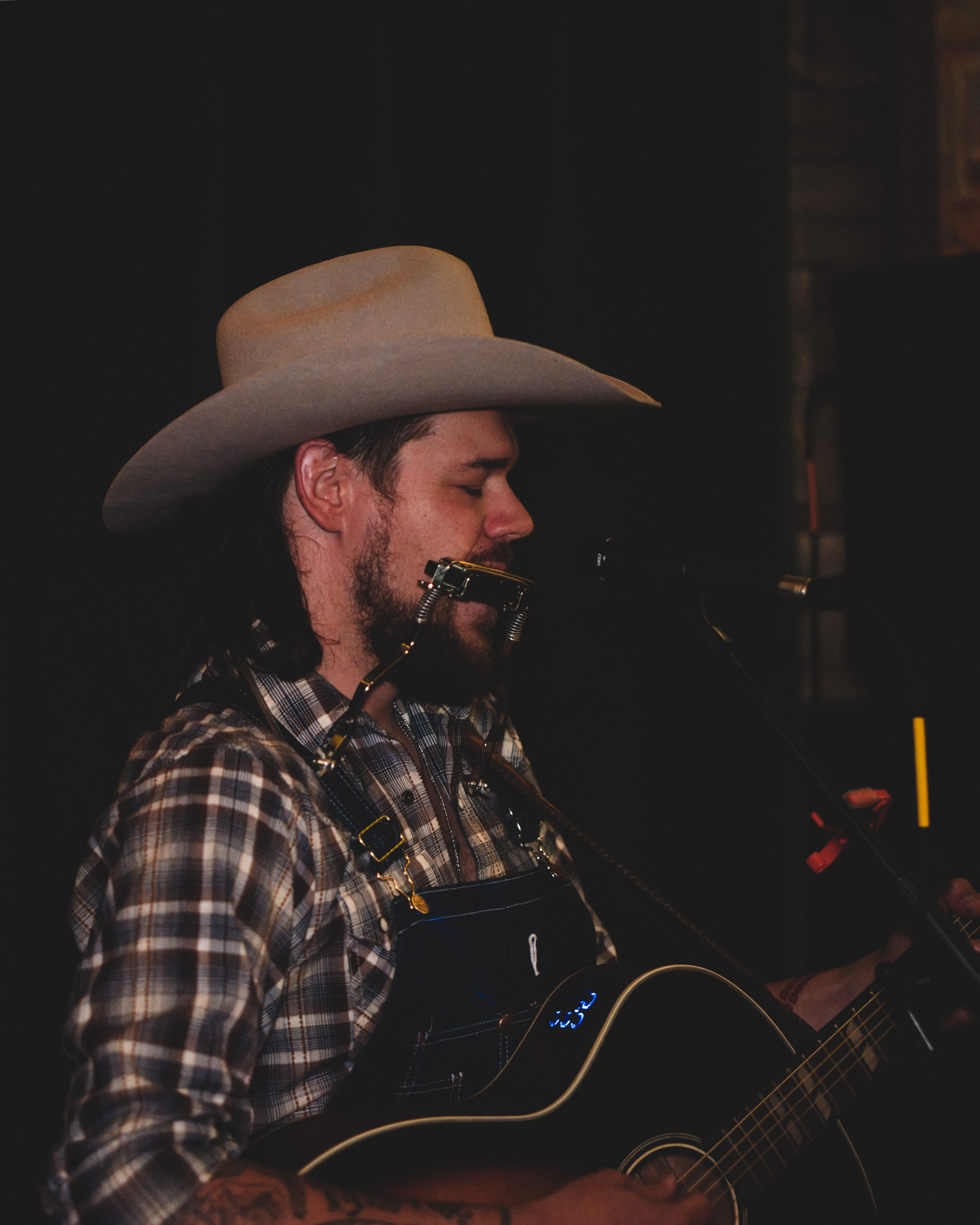
- Dutch singer-songwriter TuskHead performing live at The Wicked Monk in New York City

Background information
- Birth name: Patrick van Zandwijk
- Born: May 30, 1995 (age 30); Gorinchem, Netherlands
- Origin: Asperen, Netherlands
- Genres: Americana, folk, country
- Occupation(s): Singer-songwriter, multi-instrumentalist
- Years active: 2019–present
- Website: Official website

TuskHead is the stage name of Dutch singer-songwriter and multi-instrumentalist Patrick van Zandwijk (born 30 May 1995), a musician that blends Americana, folk, and country influences. Active since the early 2020s, he has released multiple independent projects and performed across the Netherlands and internationally.

== Early life and education ==
Patrick van Zandwijk was born in Gorinchem in 1995 and grew up in Asperen, in the Dutch province of Gelderland. He developed an early interest in country music through the K-Rose radio station featured in the video game Grand Theft Auto: San Andreas, which played a mix of classic country songs. This influence led him to learn guitar, banjo, and mandolin, and he began composing music at a young age. As of 2024, van Zandwijk resides in Gemonde, North Brabant.

== Career ==
TuskHead began releasing music independently in 2021 with the EP The Rambler, followed by his debut album Change of Shape in 2022.

In 2023, he traveled to Nashville, Tennessee, to collaborate with American country artist Josh Morningstar. Several songs written during this collaboration were recorded at Modern Electric Sound Recorders in Dallas, Texas, with contributions from members of The Texas Gentlemen. The resulting EP, Modern Electric Sessions, was released in 2024. Two of its tracks, "Maybe" and "Goodbye, Music City", reached number 3 and number 5 respectively in the 2024 Gelderse Top 20.

In February 2025, TuskHead released "One Night Show", the lead single from his album Two Faced, released in May 2025. The song features UK-based singer Dave McPherson of the band InMe. The collaboration blends Americana and rock influences, and was well-received for its depth and energy.

In June 2025, TuskHead was featured as a "One to Watch" on the Euro Americana Chart, a monthly European chart of Americana and roots music compiled by approximately 70 journalists, DJs, and promoters across Europe.

== Media coverage ==
TuskHead has been featured in various Dutch publications. In April 2025, Algemeen Dagblad profiled his efforts to bring Americana music to a Dutch audience. A biographical article appeared in Weekblad De Brug. Mooi Schijndel covered his American studio sessions and collaboration with Josh Morningstar.

== Discography ==
- The Rambler (EP, 2021)
- Change of Shape (Album, 2022)
- Little Lights (EP, 2023)
- Modern Electric Sessions (EP, 2024)
- One Night Show (Single, 2025)
- Two Faced (Album, May 2025)
