= Rob Lynch =

Teacher and former singer-songwriter

- Born: 1 May 1986 (age 40)
- Origin: Stamford, Lincolnshire
- Genres: Alternative rock, indie rock, folk
- Occupations: Singer, songwriter, instrumentalist
- Years active: 2006–present
- Labels: Walnut Tree Records, Xtra Mile Recordings, Grand Hotel van Cleef, LAB Records
- Website: roblynch.tumblr.com

Rob Lynch (born 1 May 1986) is an English educator and singer-songwriter, formerly known as Lost On Campus. He released three EPs under that name before reverting to his birth name and releasing the EP Rob Lynch on 3 October 2011, followed by No Blood on 21 December 2012. His debut album, All These Nights in Bars Will Somehow Save My Soul, was released on 22 September 2014 through Xtra Mile Recordings.

== Career ==
Lynch grew up in Stamford, Lincolnshire. He relocated to London to help his music career.

=== Lost on Campus ===
Lynch's first three EP's were released under the performing name Lost On Campus.

His first EP, There's Room on My Shoulders, was released towards the end of 2006. He subsequently signed with LAB Records and released the EP Tell Them I Had A Wonderful Life in 2007. His next EP, In Pursuit Of Courage & Heart, was released in late 2012. It received national airplay on Tom Robinson's BBC Radio 6 Show, who described it as "fresh, vibey and original, with bags of attitude".

=== Rob Lynch ===
On 19 August 2011, it was announced that had signed to Walnut Tree Records where he would release Rob Lynch EP. Lynch also announced that he would no longer be releasing music under the name Lost on Campus and would instead be reverting to his birth name. In December 2012, Lynch released No Blood.

In November 2013, Lynch embarked on a 17 date tour of Germany supporting Thees Uhlmann who signed Lynch to his Grand Hotel van Cleef record label. Lynch spent the summer of 2014 on the US Warped Tour.

He announced on 20 June 2014 that his debut album, All These Nights in Bars Will Somehow Save My Soul, would be released on 22 September 2014 through Xtra Mile Recordings.

In 2016, Lynch released his second album, Baby, I'm a Runaway. The album featured a full band line-up in a departure from his original stripped back sound.

In September 2019, he started to be a primary school teacher.

== Discography ==
=== EPs ===
- There's Room On My Shoulders – (2006) (as 'Lost on Campus')
- Tell Them I Had A Wonderful Life – (2007) (as 'Lost on Campus')
- In Pursuit Of Courage & Heart – (2010) (as 'Lost on Campus')
- Rob Lynch – (2011)
- No Blood – (2012)

=== Albums ===
- All These Nights in Bars Will Somehow Save My Soul – (2014)
- Baby, I'm a Runaway – (2016)
