= They Don't Change Under Moonlight =

Studio album by Tiger Please
- Released: November 2, 2009
- Recorded: April 2009
- Genre: Alternative rock
- Length: 29:53
- Label: Walnut Tree
- Producer: Todd Campbell

Tiger Please chronology
They Don't Change Under Moonlight (2009)	Seasons (2010)

They Don't Change Under Moonlight is the debut mini album from Welsh rock band Tiger Please which was released 2 November 2009.

== Critical reception ==
Professional ratings
Review scores
Source	Rating
The Digital Fix	9/10 stars
Kerrang!	4/5 stars
Punktastic	4/5 stars

Reviews for the album have been generally very positive. The Digital Fix called the album "a phenomenal piece of work that has come out of absolutely nowhere", particularly praising Leon Stanford's voice and the band's ability to be ambitious to a grandiose extent yet personal and heartfelt at the same time. Punktastic similarly praised Stanford's vocals and remarked that "There have been so many talented Welsh bands in the last few years and Tiger Please are among the best." "[The album] contains not a single weak moment. From start to end this young Welsh five-piece offer a mighty, vibrant blend of muscularity and delicacy, mixing cinematic Gaslight Anthem-like storytelling with the gruff homebrewed rock vintage of Pearl Jam," wrote David McLaughlin of Kerrang!.

== Track listing ==
All songs written by Tiger Please.

1. "Intro" - 0:23
2. "Strawberry Moon" - 3:54
3. "Set Sail" - 1:21
4. "The Armada" - 3:43
5. "Let Me In" - 0:19
6. "There's No Hero in Heroin" - 4:04
7. "City Lights" - 1:27
8. "Without Country" - 3:36
9. "Interlude" - 1:01
10. "This Side of This Town" - 5:10
11. "Lullabye" - 0:32
12. "Lights and Sounds" - 4:24

== Personnel ==
Tiger Please

- Leon Stanford – vocals
- Tyla Campbell – guitars
- Luc Morris – guitars
- Jimmi Kendall – bass
- Lewis Rowsell – drums

Additional musicians

- Clare Baxter – violin
- Sophia Glennon – violin
- Jonny Hoyle – viola
- Emyr Gruffydd – cello
- Neil Starr – additional vocals
