= This Could Be a Possibility =

Studio album by Valencia
- Released: October 25, 2005
- Studio: Skylight
- Genre: Pop punk
- Length: 32:39
- Label: I Surrender
- Producer: Vince Ratti, Rachel Minton

Valencia chronology
This Could Be a Possibility (2005)	We All Need a Reason to Believe (2008)

Professional ratings
Review scores
Source	Rating
AllMusic	3/5 stars
Melodic	2.5/5 stars
Punknews.org	1.5/5 stars

This Could Be a Possibility is the debut studio album by American pop punk band Valencia.

== Production ==
This Could Be a Possibility was recorded at Skylight Studios in Fairless Hills, Pennsylvania. Vince Ratti and Rachel Minton of Zolof the Rock & Roll Destroyer produced, engineered, and mixed the recordings, before they were mastered by John Fewell at Forgetful Foreigner Studios in Brooklyn, New York.

== Release ==
The album was made available for streaming via Mammoth Press on October 24, 2005 and released through I Surrender Records a day later. On November 14, 2005, the music video for "The Space Between" was posted online. The band embarked on a cross-country Us tour until the end of the year. In April 2006, the band supported Punchline on their headlining US tour. They then toured with Action Action throughout July 2006, and appeared at Dirt Fest in the following month. The album was later reissued on September 19, 2006. It consisted of ten tracks, with the final track "Away We Go" also appearing as a different version on the first album by lead singer Shane Henderson's solo project, Promise of Redemption. In November and December 2006, the band went on tour with Spitalfield, Punchline, Boys Like Girls and Over It.

In March and April 2007, the band supported Hit the Lights on their headlining US tour. Following this, they appeared at The Bamboozle festival. From late July to early August 2007, the band went on the 2007 edition of Warped Tour. In September, the group went on the School's for Fools tour across the US, alongside Just Surrender, We the Kings and Metro Station. However, partway through the tour the group had to drop off the tour due to vocalist Shane Henderson having strep throat. As a result, Just Surrender headlined the rest of the dates. The group supported Boys Like Girls on their US headlining tour, dubbed Tourzilla, from late October to late November.

== Track listing ==
Track listing per booklet.

1. "The Space Between" – 3:37
2. "Que Sera Sera" – 3:55
3. "What Are You Doing, Man? That's Weird!" – 2:56
4. "Tenth Street" – 3:55
5. "The Closest I Am to Living Life on the Edge" – 3:29
6. "Will We Ever Know How?" – 3:13
7. "Eagle Mount Drive" – 2:47
8. "3000 Miles" – 2:46
9. "Backs Against the Wall" – 2:43
10. "Away We Go" – 3:18

== Personnel ==
Personnel per booklet.

Valencia

- Shane Henderson – vocals
- George Ciukurescu – bass
- JD Perry – guitar
- Brendan Walter – guitar
- Maxim Soria – drums

Additional musicians

- Trevor Leonard – additional vocals (track 5)
- Rachel Minton – additional vocals (track 6)
- Heath Saraceno – programming (track 5)

Production and design

- Vince Ratti – producer, engineer, mixing
- Rachel Minton – producer, engineer, mixing
- John Fewell – mastering
- Brian Kelly – photography
- Nick Arey – photography, band photography
- Arson in the City – art direction, design
