= Americana music =

Genre of music and radio format

Americana
- Stylistic origins: Country; bluegrass; blues; folk; western; gospel
- Cultural origins: Mid 1950s – Early 1970s, United States
- Derivative forms: Old-time music; roots rock; folk rock; folk pop; rhythm and blues; rock and roll

Local scenes
- United States

Americana is a general term for roots or traditional music formed by the confluence of the shared and varied traditions that make up the musical ethos of the United States, with particular emphasis on music historically developed in the American South.

== Definition ==
The term "Americana music" was defined by the Americana Music Association (AMA) in 2020 as "...the rich threads of country, folk, blues, soul, bluegrass, gospel, and rock in our tapestry." A previous 2016 AMA definition of the genre included rhythm and blues, with additional comments that Americana music results "in a distinctive roots-oriented sound that lives in a world apart from the pure forms of the genres upon which it may draw. While acoustic instruments are often present and vital, Americana also often uses a full electric band."

== History ==
=== Prehistory: Roots music ===
The origins of Americana music can be traced back to the early 20th century, when rural American musicians began incorporating elements of folk, blues, and country music into their songs. Americana musicians often played acoustic instruments such as the guitar, banjo, fiddle, and upright bass, and their songs typically told stories about the struggles and hardships of everyday life.

=== Folk music revival ===
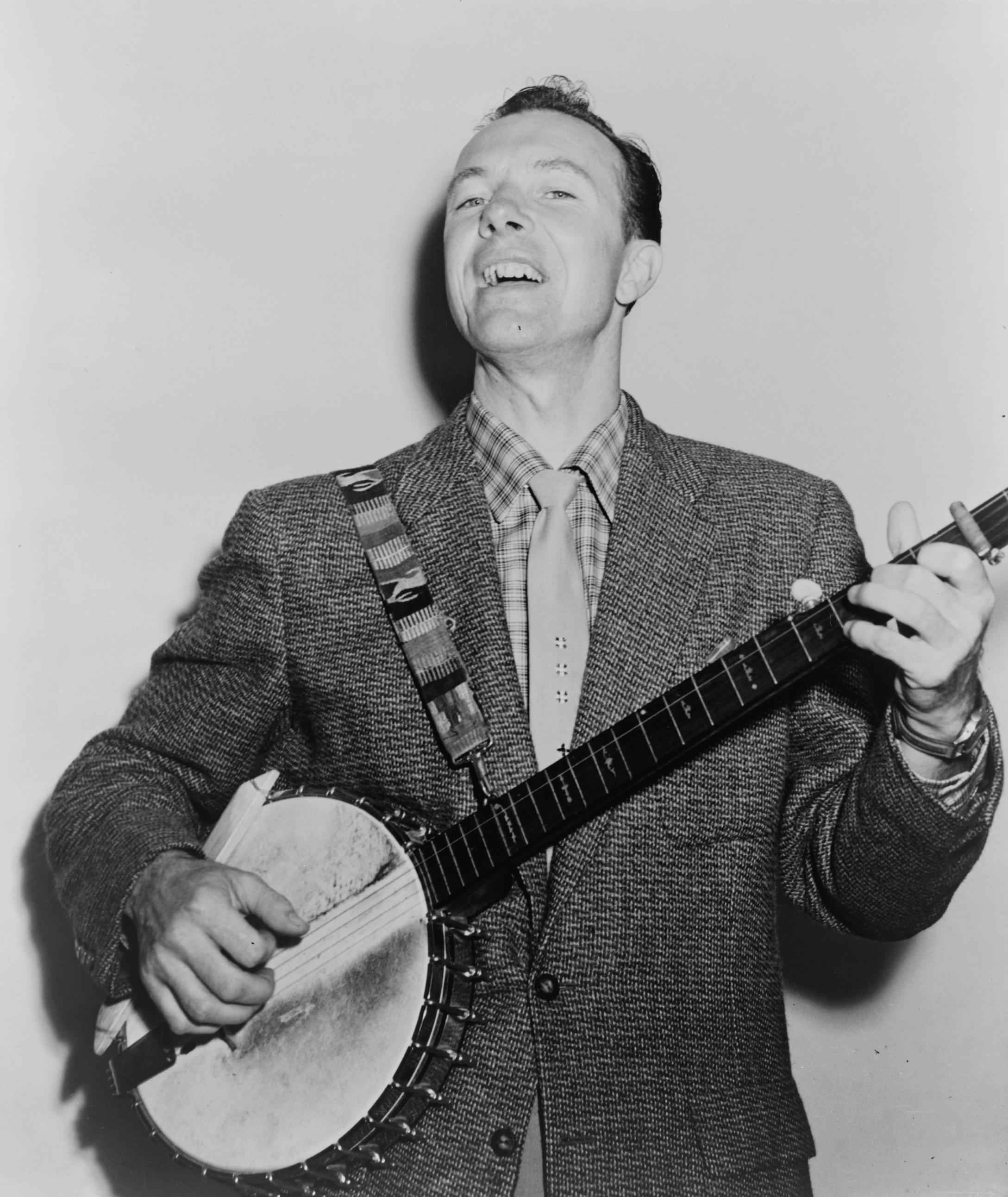
Pete Seeger in 1955

The American folk music revival began during the 1940s and peaked in popularity in the mid-1960s. The folk revival in New York City was rooted in the resurgent interest in square dancing and folk dancing there in the 1940s as espoused by instructors such as Margot Mayo, which gave musicians such as Pete Seeger popular exposure. The folk revival more generally as a popular and commercial phenomenon begins with the career of The Weavers, formed in November 1948 by Pete Seeger, Lee Hays, Fred Hellerman, and Ronnie Gilbert of People's Songs, of which Seeger had been president and Hays executive secretary.

The Kingston Trio, a group originating on the West Coast, were directly inspired by the Weavers in their style and presentation and covered some of the Weavers' material, which was predominantly traditional. The Kingston Trio's popularity would be followed by that of Joan Baez, whose debut album Joan Baez reached the top ten in late 1960 and remained on the Billboard charts for over two years. It was not long before the folk-music category came to include less traditional material and more personal and poetic creations by individual performers, who called themselves "singer-songwriters". As a result of the financial success of high-profile commercial folk artists, record companies began to produce and distribute records by a new generation of folk revival and singer-songwriters Phil Ochs, Tom Paxton, Eric von Schmidt, Buffy Sainte-Marie, Dave Van Ronk, Judy Collins, Tom Rush, Fred Neil, Gordon Lightfoot, Billy Ed Wheeler, John Denver, John Stewart, Arlo Guthrie, Harry Chapin, and John Hartford, among others.

Some of this wave had emerged from family singing and playing traditions, and some had not. These singers frequently prided themselves on performing traditional material in imitations of the style of the source singers whom they had discovered, frequently by listening to Harry Smith's celebrated LP compilation of forgotten or obscure commercial 78 rpm "race" and "hillbilly" recordings of the 1920s and 30s, the Folkways Anthology of American Folk Music (1951). A number of the artists who had made these old recordings were still very much alive and had been "rediscovered" and brought to the 1963 and 64 Newport Folk Festivals. For example, traditionalist Clarence Ashley introduced folk revivalists to the music of friends of his who still actively played the older music, such as Doc Watson and The Stanley Brothers.

=== Emergence of folk rock ===
In the 1950s and 1960s, folk revival music began to evolve and incorporate elements of rock and roll and other popular music styles. Artists such as Bob Dylan and the Byrds began blending traditional folk and country music with electric guitars and drums, creating a new sound that came to be known as folk rock.

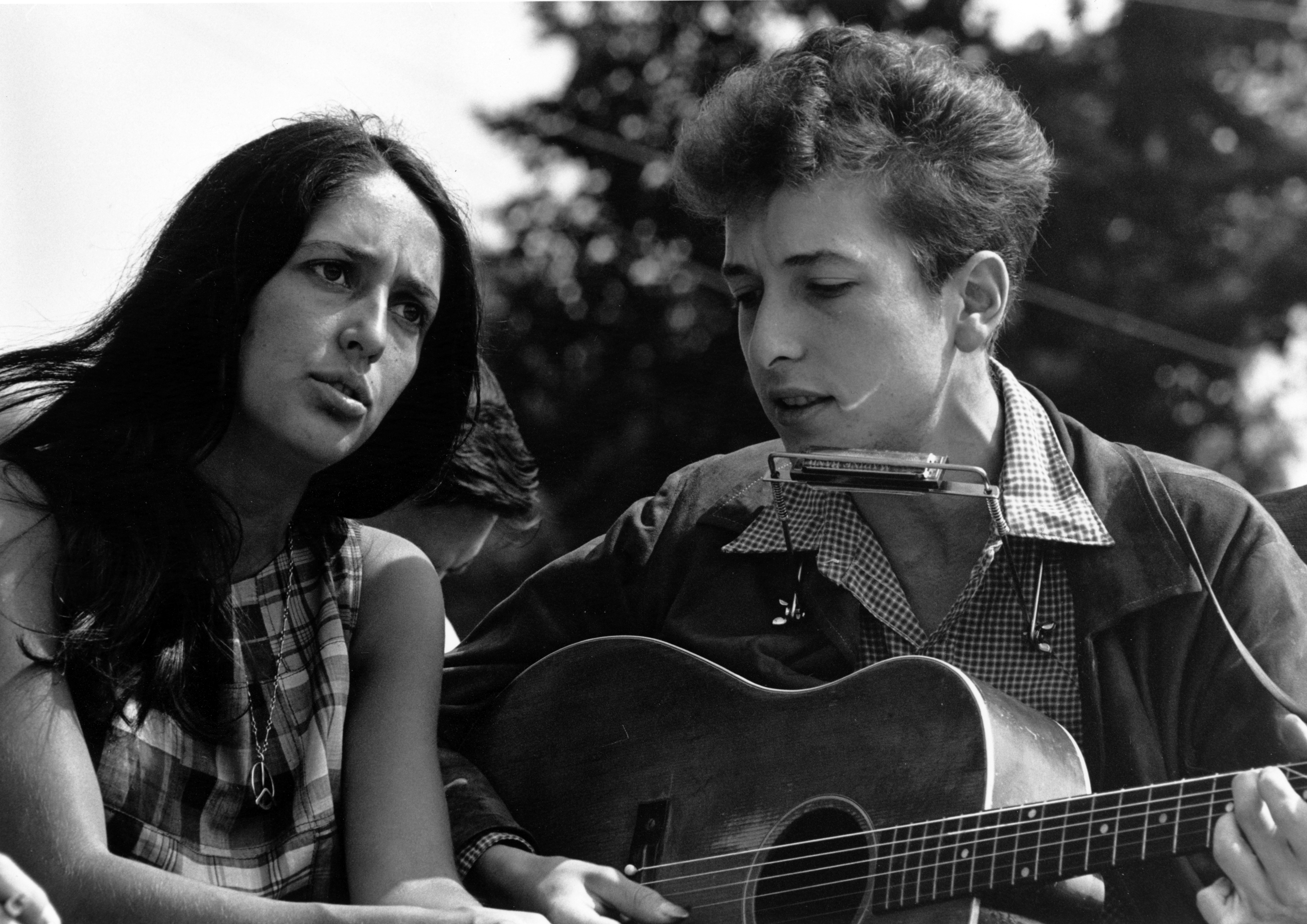
Joan Baez and Bob Dylan in 1963

On January 20, 1965, the Byrds entered Columbia Studios in Hollywood to record Bob Dylan's acoustic tune "Mr. Tambourine Man" for release as their debut single on Columbia. The full, electric rock band treatment that the Byrds and producer Terry Melcher had given the song effectively created the template for the musical subgenre of folk rock. McGuinn's melodic, jangling 12-string Rickenbacker guitar playing—which was heavily compressed to produce an extremely bright and sustained tone—was immediately influential and has remained so to the present day. The single also featured another major characteristic of the band's sound: their clear harmony singing, which usually featured McGuinn and Clark in unison, with Crosby providing the high harmony. Additionally, Richie Unterberger has stated that the song's abstract lyrics took rock and pop songwriting to new heights; never before had such intellectual and literary wordplay been combined with rock instrumentation by a popular music group.

Within three months "Mr. Tambourine Man" had become the first folk rock smash hit, reaching number one on both the U.S. Billboard Hot 100 chart and the UK Singles Chart. The single's success initiated the folk rock boom of 1965 and 1966, during which a number of Byrds-influenced acts had hits on the American and British charts. The term "folk rock" was itself coined by the American music press to describe the band's sound in June 1965, at roughly the same time as "Mr. Tambourine Man" peaked at number 1 in the U.S.

The commercial success of the Byrds' cover version of Dylan's "Mr. Tambourine Man" and their debut album Mr. Tambourine Man, along with Dylan's own recordings with rock instrumentation—on the albums Bringing It All Back Home (1965), Highway 61 Revisited (1965), and Blonde on Blonde (1966)—encouraged other folk acts, such as Simon & Garfunkel, to use electric backing on their records and new groups, such as Buffalo Springfield, to form. Dylan's controversial appearance at the Newport Folk Festival on July 25, 1965, where he was backed by an electric band, was also a pivotal moment in the development of the genre.

=== Emergence of alternative country ===
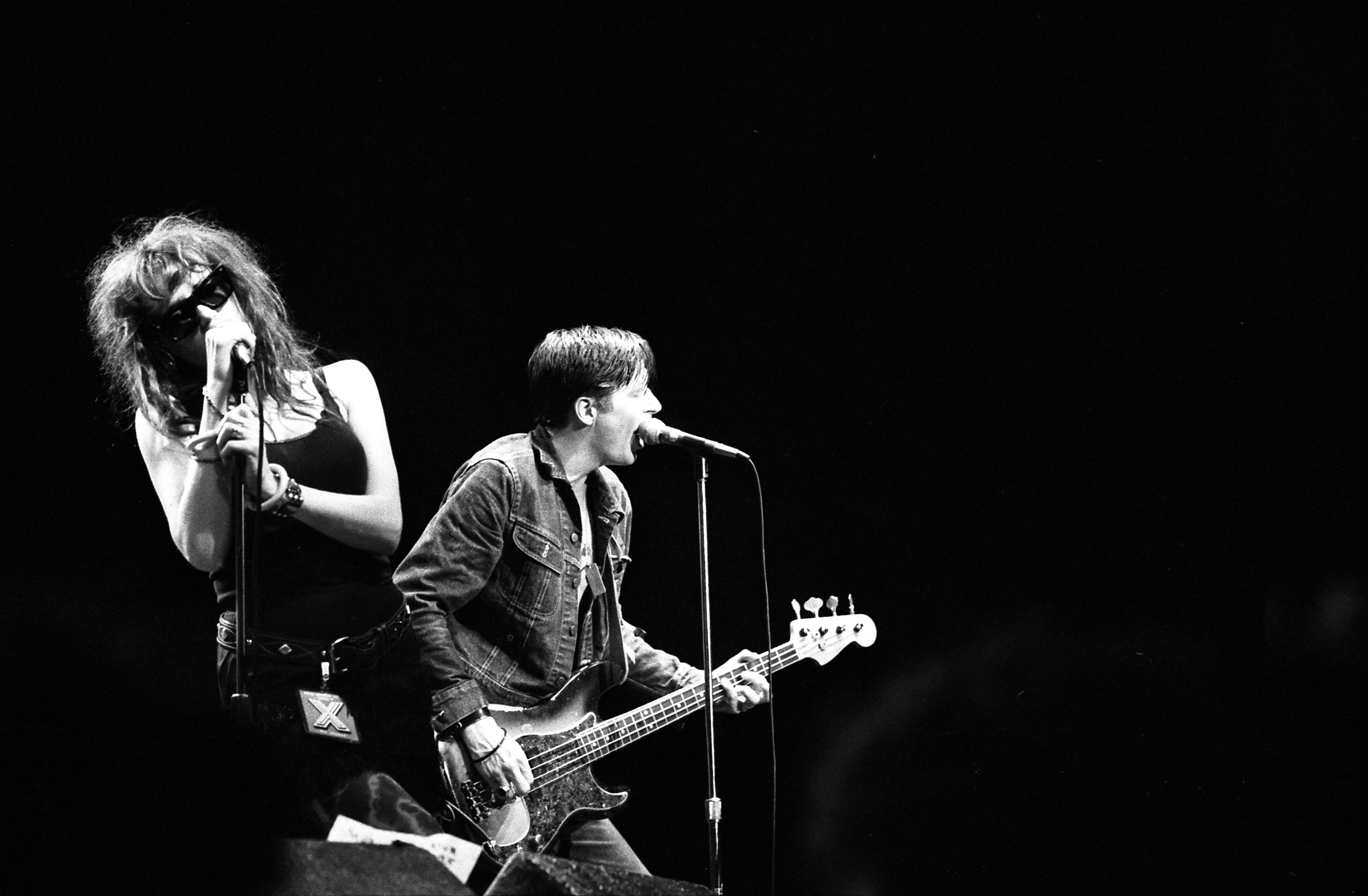
Exene Cervenka and John Doe during an X concert in 1983

In the 1990s, the term 'alternative country'—mirroring the rise of alternative rock—emerged to describe a diverse group of artists working outside the norms and commercial structures of mainstream country music. Many eschewed the increasingly polished production values and pop sensibilities of the Nashville-dominated industry for a more lo-fi sound, frequently infused with a strong punk and rock and roll aesthetic. Alternative country drew on traditional American country music, the music of working people, preserved and celebrated by practitioners such as Woody Guthrie, Hank Williams, and The Carter Family, often cited as major influences. Another major influence was country rock, the result of fusing country music with a rock & roll sound. The artist most commonly thought to have originated country rock is Gram Parsons (who referred to his sound as "Cosmic American Music"), although Michael Nesmith, Steve Earle and Gene Clark are frequently identified as important innovators. The third factor was punk rock, which supplied an energy and DIY attitude.

Attempts to combine punk and country had been pioneered by Nashville's Jason and the Scorchers, and in the 1980s Southern Californian cowpunk scene with bands like the Long Ryders and X, and the Minneapolis-based band the Jayhawks. X signed with major label Elektra in 1982 and released Under the Big Black Sun, which marked a departure from their trademark sound. While still fast and loud, with raw punk guitars, the album displayed evolving country leanings. The Scorchers released their debut, the self-produced EP Reckless Country Soul, in 1982 on the independent Praxis label. These styles merged fully in Uncle Tupelo's 1990 LP No Depression, which is widely credited as being the first "alt-country" album, and gave its name to the online notice board and eventually magazine that underpinned the movement.

=== Formation of Americana Music Association ===
In the 1990s and 2000s, Americana music underwent a resurgence in popularity, as a new generation of artists began incorporating elements of traditional American music into their songs. Artists such as Wilco, Lucinda Williams, and Gillian Welch helped to popularise a new style of Americana music that blended elements of rock, folk, country, and blues.

Rolling Stone notes that

"Americana" first came to fashion as a descriptive musical phrase in the mid-Nineties, when a group of radio promoters and industry outsiders dispersed throughout Nashville, California and Texas sought to carve out a distinct marketplace for a wave of traditionally minded songwriters like Guy Clark, Darrell Scott and Jim Lauderdale, artists whose work was no longer being served by a country music industry riding high on Garth Brooks and Shania Twain.

This new style of music reflected a renewed interest in traditional American music forms, and it helped to establish Americana music as a distinct and important genre in its own right.

The Americana Music Association, a not-for-profit trade organization advocating for American Roots Music around the world, was formed in 1999. It is a network for Americana artists, radio stations, record labels, publishers, and others with the goal of developing an infrastructure that will boost visibility and economic viability.

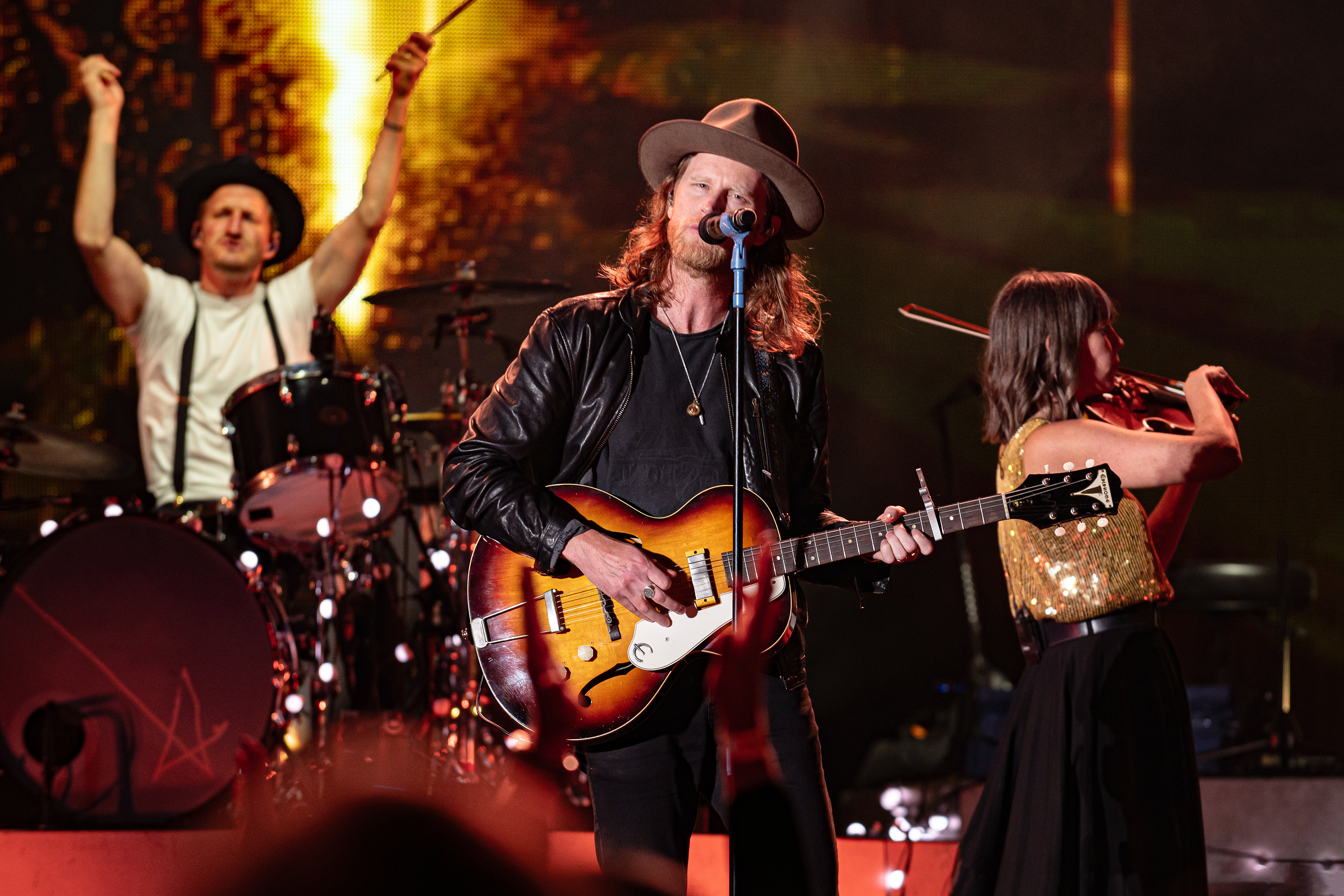
The Lumineers performing in 2023

The 2010s saw several musical groups connected with Americana music finding their way on to the Billboard charts. Bands like Mumford and Sons, The Lumineers and The Avett Brothers helped bring contemporary Americana to more people than ever before. Their popularity as artists took the genre (which was somewhat of a niche, in the shadow of country and rock) and made it mainstream.

In 2011, the genre was officially inducted into the Merriam-Webster dictionary.

=== Expansion of definition ===
In recent years, the genre has incorporated more influences from blues, R&B, and soul, in addition to the country and folk elements that have always been prominent. Alongside these musical shifts, Americana has also grown in international popularity, particularly in Europe. Notable Dutch artists such as Ad Vanderveen and the group The Common Linnets have contributed to the genre's expansion beyond the United States. In June 2025, Dutch singer-songwriter TuskHead was named a "One to Watch" on the Euro Americana Chart, reflecting the increasing presence of European artists within the Americana scene. In 2017 Rolling Stone published an article claiming that Americana was having an "identity crisis," which focused on changing definitions and efforts to promote ethnic diversity in the genre.

In 2014, traditional country musician Dale Watson formed the Ameripolitan Music Awards, focused on the genres of honky tonk, outlaw, Western swing, and rockabilly, on the premise that these genres can no longer be properly categorized as country or Americana, thus necessitating the creation of a new term, "Ameripolitan".

== Radio format ==
The radio station laying the best claim to the Americana radio format origins is KFAT in Gilroy, California, active from mid-1975 to January 1983, as described in the book Fat Chance, authored by Gilbert Klein in 2016 and published by MainFramePress.com. KFAT was succeeded by KHIP in Hollister, California, KPIG in Freedom, California, and Fat 99 KPHT-LP in Laytonville, California. Though some say Americana as a radio format had its origins in 1984 on KCSN ("college radio") in Northridge, California, but that did not happen until after KFAT, Gilroy went off the air when it was sold and the format changed.

Mark Humphrey, a contributor to country/folk Frets magazine, hosted a weekly radio show called "Honky Tonk Amnesia" which played "country, folk, honky tonk, cajun, dawg, blues, and old-time music", a combination that the country music station KCSN advertised as "Americana". The format came into its own in the mid-1990s as a descriptive phrase used by radio promoters and music industry figures for traditionally-oriented songwriters and performers.

Americana type radio shows can be heard on a variety of non commercial radio stations.

== Use in Canada and elsewhere ==
Despite the genre's most common name, it is not practiced solely by artists from the United States, as numerous artists from Canada are also prominent in the genre. Canadian bands in the genre will sometimes be referred to as Canadiana rather than Americana in Canadian media, although this is not a widely recognized synonym elsewhere. A Norwegian scene is often referred to as Nordicana.

== See also ==
- Alternative country
- Americana Music Festival & Conference
- Country rock
- Grammy Award for Best Americana Album
- Heartland rock
- Mile of Music
- Roots rock
- Sisters Folk Festival
- Southern rock
