= Rumour Cubes =

British post-rock band

- Origin: London, England
- Genres: Post-rock
- Years active: 2009–present
- Label: Marriage of a Dead Dog SING!
- Members: Omar Rahwangi; Adam Stark; Hannah Morgan; Joe Bartlett; Jay Malhotra; Terry Murphy
- Past members: Simon Stark; Siew Cottis
- Website: http://rumourcubes.bandcamp.com

Rumour Cubes are a British six-piece instrumental post-rock band based in London, England. The band's music has been described as post-rock, cinematic and atmospheric and likened to bands such as Godspeed You! Black Emperor, and Yndi Halda.

== History ==
The band was formed in mid-2009 by Hannah Morgan (violin), Omar Rahwangi (drums) and Adam Stark (guitar, electronics). They were later joined by Joe Bartlett (bass), Simon Stark (guitar) and Siew Cottis (viola). In August 2010 the sextet released their debut EP We Have Sound Houses Also on the Marriage of a Dead Dog SING! record label. The EP received a warm reception. The release has also had airplay on BBC 6 Music by Tom Robinson. In early 2011 Cottis left the band and was replaced on viola by Terry Murphy.

In February 2012, the band released their debut album, The Narrow State which received coverage from The 405, The Blue Walrus, Goldflake Paint and featured in the Echoes and Dust Top 40 Albums of the Year at number six.

In June 2014, the band announced the follow-up album to The Narrow State entitled Appearances of Collections which was part-funded by a successful Kickstarter campaign. The album was released on 18 August 2014.

== Band members ==
=== Current ===
- Joe Bartlett – bass guitar
- Hannah Morgan – violin
- Terry Murphy – viola
- Omar Rahwangi – drums
- Adam Stark – guitar, electronics
- Jay Malhotra – guitar

=== Former ===
- Siew Cottis – viola
- Simon Stark – guitar

== Discography ==
=== Albums ===
- The Narrow State (2012)
- Appearances of Collections (2014)

=== EPs ===
- We Have Sound Houses Also (2010)

=== Compilations ===
- We Make Our Own Mythologies (2011)
- A Cheery Wave From Stranded Youngsters: UK Post-Rock / Instrumental / Math-Rock (3rd Wave) (2011)

== Ethos ==
The band have aligned themselves with a number of charities and political movements. In March 2011 the band performed alongside Josie Long and speakers from UK Uncut and Unite the Union at an event promoting the 2011 anti-cuts protest in London led by the TUC. Rumour Cubes also performed at Lexapalooza in February 2011, in aid of Breast Cancer Campaign, and they have appeared on the We Make Our Own Mythologies compilation for Macmillan Cancer Support. The band played a Sunkan Dymonds benefit gig in July 2011 to raise money for the British Tinnitus Association.
