= Rob Lynch (EP) =

EP by Rob Lynch
- Released: 3 October 2011
- Genre: Alternative rock, indie rock, folk
- Length: 16:43
- Label: Walnut Tree Records
- Producer: Julian Bowen

Rob Lynch chronology
In Pursuit Of Courage & Heart (2010)	Rob Lynch (2011)	No Blood (2012)

Professional ratings
Review scores
Source	Rating
Alter the Press	4.5/5 stars
Punktastic	4.5/5 stars

Rob Lynch, is the eponymously-titled five-track EP from singer-songwriter Rob Lynch. It is Lynch's first release not to be released under the moniker Lost On Campus. It has been nicknamed "The East EP" by fans.

== Track listing ==
All music is composed by Rob Lynch

No.	Title	Length
1.	"Hawking"	3:50
2.	"Souls"	2:51
3.	"Plans"	3:21
4.	"Sleeping"	3:29
5.	"My Friends & I"	3:13
Total length:		16:43

== Band members ==
- Rob Lynch – vocals/guitar
- Julian Bowen – extra instrumentation/additional vocals
- Hero Baldwin – additional vocals
- Alex Rumble – additional vocals
