= Paige (band) =

English pop punk/rock band

- Origin: Hertfordshire, England
- Genres: Pop punk, pop rock
- Years active: 2006–2013
- Labels: Walnut Tree Records (UK), No Order Records (UK), Small Town (UK), Kick Rock (JP)
- Past members: Lewis White; Aaron Hunt; Arthur Walwin; Alex Tillbrook; Paul Hinwood; Nathan White; Jason Webb; Adam Taylor; Terry Clarke
- Website: http://www.myspace.com/paigeuk

Paige were a pop punk/rock band formed in 2006 in Hertfordshire, England, by then guitarist and vocalist Lewis White and drummer Alex Tillbrook. They have performed across Europe and Japan under UK label Small Town Records and Japan based label Kick Rock Music. Their latest EP was released on 24 January 2011 entitled, 'Young Summer', with the video for the title track filmed across two days in Sweden has been featured on the television station Kerrang. They supported a number of bands including Kids In Glass Houses, You Me At Six and Bring Me the Horizon.

== History ==
Paige was formed in 2006 by Lewis White on guitar and vocals and Alex Tillbrook on drums, the band released their debut E.P. "If you say so" in 2008 by which time the band had also features Aaron Hunt on guitar, Nathan White on Bass guitar and Paul Hinwood on Keyboards. Between the release of the debut and its follow up, Nathan White departed the band. The band released their second E.P. "Young Summer" in 2011 to a mixed response from fans and critics who saw it as a lesser achievement than its predecessor. Arthur Walwin who fulfilled the remainder of the band's tour in support of "Young Summer" before the band began writing their first full-length album. The band began playing songs from their upcoming album on their more recent tours.

Recording and mixing of Paige's debut album had been funded by pledgemusic.

On 1 August 2012, it was announced that Paul Hinwood had left Paige, the band also confirmed that they would not be replacing Paul and would be continuing as a four-piece. In the same post, it was announced that the new album was nearing completion.

== Past band members ==
- Lewis White – bass guitar, vocals
- Aaron Hunt – guitar
- Arthur Walwin – guitar, vocals
- Alex Tillbrook – drums
- Paul Hinwood – keyboards
- Nathan White – bass
- Michael Jennings – keyboard/vocals
- Jason Webb – bass
- Adam Taylor – bass
- Terry Clarke – guitar/piano

== Discography ==
- If You Say So Walnut Tree Records/No Order Records, 2008 (EP)
- Young Summer Small Town Records, 2011 (EP)
