= Overgrown Eden =

Studio album by InMe
- Released: 27 January 2003
- Studio: The Chapel, Lincolnshire, England
- Genre: Post-grunge, alternative rock
- Length: 46:45
- Label: Music for Nations; V2 Records (re-release)
- Producer: Colin Richardson

InMe chronology
Overgrown Eden (2003)	White Butterfly (2005)

Singles from Overgrown Eden
- 1. "Underdose" Released: 15 July 2002; 2. "Firefly" Released: 16 November 2002; 3. "Crushed Like Fruit" Released: 6 January 2003; 4. "Neptune" Released: 14 April 2003

Professional ratings
Review scores
Source	Rating
Kerrang!	3/5 stars

Overgrown Eden is the debut album from Essex rock band InMe. The album was released in the UK on 27 January 2003. The album produced four singles before and after the album's release. The singles released were "Underdose", "Firefly", "Crushed like Fruit" and "Neptune". The album was re-released in its original format on 5 June 2006. This was due to getting the rights for Overgrown Eden from the now defunct record label Music for Nations (which transferred to Zomba). Due to the demise of MFN, this was the first and last album released by InMe on this record label.

The highest UK Album Chart position was No. 15. However, it reached No. 1 in the Rock Album Chart.

== Track listing ==
1. "Underdose" – 3:12
2. "Firefly" – 3:33
3. "Wounds" – 4:42
4. "Lava Twilight" – 4:38
5. "Natural" – 3:14
6. "Her Mask (P.A.)" – 5:21
7. "Energy" – 3:18
8. "Crushed Like Fruit" – 3:16
9. "Icewarm" – 5:00
10. "Trenches" – 3:10
11. "Neptune" – 3:48
12. "Mosaic" – 3:33
