= Daydream Anonymous =

Studio album by InMe
- Released: 10 September 2007
- Recorded: 2007
- Genre: Alternative rock, alternative metal
- Length: 65:30
- Label: Graphite Records / Northern Music
- Producer: Jens Bogren

InMe chronology
Caught: White Butterfly (2006)	Daydream Anonymous (2007)	iTunes Live: London Festival '08 (2008)

Singles from Daydream Anonymous
- 1. "I Won't Let Go" Released: 10 October 2007

Professional ratings
Review scores
Source	Rating
Kerrang!	4/5 stars
Metal Hammer	7/10 stars
Rock Sound	7/10 stars
Rocklouder	4/5 stars

Daydream Anonymous is the third studio album by InMe and was released on 10 September 2007. It is the first album to feature Greg McPherson (Dave's younger brother) on bass. Following the release the band got back out on tour starting at Wolverhampton Wulfrun Hall on 15 September 2007.

== History ==
On 7 December 2006, the band announced over MySpace that their new album will be called Daydream Anonymous. They also placed four demos on their MySpace page: "Myths and Photographs", "I Won't Let Go", "Soldier" and "Raindrops on Stones", all recorded using Dave McPherson's Mac.

The album debuted at number 72 on the UK Albums chart, and reached number 2 on the UK Rock Albums chart.

== Track listing ==
Between the first release of a track list and the release of the album itself, a few track names were changed. Most notably a track titled "Ya Ya Serenade (Ameranth)" became "In Loving Memory".

1. Myths & Photographs
2. Far-Reaching
3. I Won't Let Go
4. Turbulence
5. Cracking the Whip
6. In Loving Memory
7. Daydream Anonymous
8. Here's Hoping
9. Rain Drops on Stones
10. Thanks for Leaving Me
11. Soldier
12. 2nd Jonquil
13. A Toast to Broken Glass
14. Papillons Stalemate [Limited Edition]
