= White Butterfly (album) =

Studio album by InMe
- Released: 20 June 2005
- Genre: Alternative rock, alternative metal
- Length: 54:54
- Label: V2 Records
- Producer: Josh Abraham

InMe chronology
Overgrown Eden (2003)	White Butterfly (2005)	Caught: White Butterfly (2006)

Singles from White Butterfly
- 1. "Faster The Chase" Released: 25 May 2004; 2. "Otherside" Released: 6 December 2004; 3. "7 Weeks" Released: 18 July 2005; 4. "So You Know" Released: 10 October 2005; 5. "Safe In A Room/White Butterfly" Released: 19 December 2005

White Butterfly is the second album from Essex alternative rock band InMe. It was released on 20 June 2005 under the record label V2 Records.

It was recorded by Josh Abraham in Los Angeles.

Hot Press described it as "an excellent sophomore effort."

== Track listing ==
No.	Title	Length
1.	"7 Weeks"	3:42
2.	"So You Know"	3:38
3.	"This Town"	3:59
4.	"Otherside"	4:21
5.	"Faster the Chase"	3:32
6.	"You'll Get There"	3:35
7.	"White Butterfly"	3:45
8.	"Safe in a Room"	3:47
9.	"Just a Glimpse"	4:06
10.	"Almost Lost"	3:36
11.	"A World Apart"	3:30
12.	"Chamber"	4:43
13.	"Parting Gift" (Hidden track)	2:10
14.	"Angels with Snipers" (Limited edition)	3:18
15.	"Every Whisper Aches" (Limited edition)	3:19
Total length:		56:01
