= Valencia (band) =

American alternative rock band

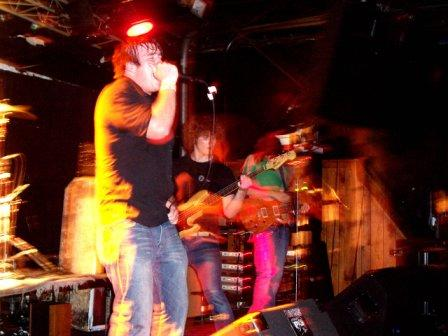
- Valencia performing at The Berkeley Cafe in Raleigh, North Carolina on July 24, 2005

Background information
- Origin: Philadelphia, Pennsylvania, United States
- Genres: Alternative rock, pop punk, emo pop
- Years active: 2004–2011, 2016–present
- Labels: I Surrender, Columbia
- Spinoff of: The Capgun Heroes, Attracted To Miss
- Members: Shane Henderson; Dan Pawlovich; George Ciukurescu; Brendan Walter
- Past members: JD Perry; Maxim Soria; Sean Mundy; Mark Ciccone

Valencia is an American alternative rock band from Philadelphia, Pennsylvania, United States.

== History ==
=== Early years and This Could Be a Possibility (2004–2008) ===
Valencia met by playing local shows together around the tri-state area in separate bands. George Ciukurescu and JD Perry grew up together; attending elementary school, high school, and their first year of college. They joined a band in 2001 called The Capgun Heroes with Brendan Walter and former members Councilman Sean J. Mundy and Ryan O'Hara. Shane Henderson sang in the band Attracted to Miss and Max played drums in The Emphasis. They formed the band that is known today as Valencia in 2004. The band is named after the wife of the protagonist, Valencia, in the book by Kurt Vonnegut, Slaughterhouse-Five. In 2005 Valencia signed to I Surrender Records after the label's owner, Midtown's drummer Rob Hitt, heard their demo tape.

After playing the Warped Tour in 2005, they released their first album, This Could Be a Possibility, in October 2005, which was re-released in September 2006. The album has received mixed reviews. In 2006, the band was named SPIN Band of the Day and was a finalist for Band of the Year, but lost to Nightmare of You. In May 2006 the band stopped touring because of the death of Shane's girlfriend. In July 2006 Valencia traveled to Japan to play the Fuji Rock Festival. In 2007 the band toured with Boys Like Girls, The Audition and All Time Low in the U.S. Valencia also toured with We the Kings, The Cab, Charlotte Sometimes, and Sing it Loud in April 2008.

=== We All Need a Reason to Believe, Dancing with a Ghost and hiatus (2008–2011) ===
Valencia's second album, We All Need a Reason to Believe, was released on August 26, 2008, featuring 11 new tracks. The album leaked in its entirety on August 16, 2008. On August 19, 2008 it was made available as a full stream on the band's Myspace page. In 2009 Valencia performed in the Soundwave (Australian music festival) with New Found Glory, Say Anything and Billy Talent. The band opened for blink-182 in June 2009 on their summer reunion tour. Valencia spent summer 2009 touring with Every Avenue.

Band member Brendan Walter was one of 32 sued by the RIAA in its first round file-sharing suits. During an interview on WCUR's Foundation Radio on December 9, 2010, host Adam Barnard asked about the circumstances surrounding this incident. Walter stated that he had been chosen at random because he had illegally downloaded music by American rock band Smash Mouth.

Valencia's third album, Dancing with a Ghost, was released October 12, 2010. After a long break from touring, the band went back on tour for their new album in October 2010. The tour includes a few shows of headlining along with shows with bands like Say Anything, Saves the Day and Motion City Soundtrack. In June 2011, guitarist JD Perry left the band on amicable terms for personal reasons. The band continued touring obligations on the Zumiez "couch tour" with Forever the Sickest Kids and I See Stars with a friend, Trevor Leonard playing on guitar. On September 30, 2011, former Valencia drummer Maxim Soria was killed in a motorcycle accident. On October 11, 2011, Valencia announced that they were going on hiatus. Their last show was at The Electric Factory on December 28, 2011.

=== Reunion (2016–present) ===
Valencia announced two shows in September 2016. The first at Webster Hall in New York City on December 27, 2016 and the second at The Fillmore in Philadelphia on December 28, 2016, five years after their final show.

Valencia announced a ten-year anniversary concert for the album We All Need a Reason to Believe in Philadelphia at Union Transfer on December 28. Due to popular demand, the band added an additional date for December 27. They released their first single in nearly 8 years, "Fall Before I Fold" in conjunction with the announcement. On June 21, 2019, the band released two singles: "California" and "Rx".

== Other projects ==
In 2004 Shane Henderson started a solo project called Promise of Redemption. The first album, Lights That Flicker Will Surely Fade, was released by Pacific Ridge Records in 2004 and the 2nd record, When the Flowers Bloom, was released digitally December 4, 2007 and subsequently on compact disc by I Surrender Records in 2008. In 2016 Promise of Redemption signed with Know Hope Records, a label co-founded and co-owned by Valencia bandmate J.D. Perry.

== Band members ==
Current

- Shane Henderson da og – vocals (2003–2011, 2016–present)
- Daniel Pawlovich – drums (2010–2011, 2016–present)
- George Ciukurescu – bass (2003–2011, 2016–present)
- Brendan Walter – guitar (2003–2011, 2016–present)
- Trevor Leonard – guitar (2011, 2016–present)

Former

- JD Perry – guitar (2003–2011, 2016)
- Maxim Soria – drums (2003–2009); deceased
- Sean Mundy – drums (2003)

== Discography ==
=== Albums ===
| Release date | Title | Label | Notes |
|---|---|---|---|
| October 25, 2005 | This Could Be a Possibility | I Surrender | Reissued: September 19, 2006 |
| August 26, 2008 | We All Need a Reason to Believe | Columbia | U.S. Billboard Heatseekers #6 |
| October 12, 2010 | Dancing with a Ghost | I Surrender | U.S. Billboard Heatseekers #11 |

EPs

- 2009: We All Need a Reason to B Side (Columbia)

Compilation tracks

- 2007: "I Can't See Myself (Getting To Sleep At Night)" - Punk the Clock Volume 3: Property of a Gentleman

Vinyl

- 2011: B-sides and Rarities 7" - (I Surrender)
