= InMe =

British rock band

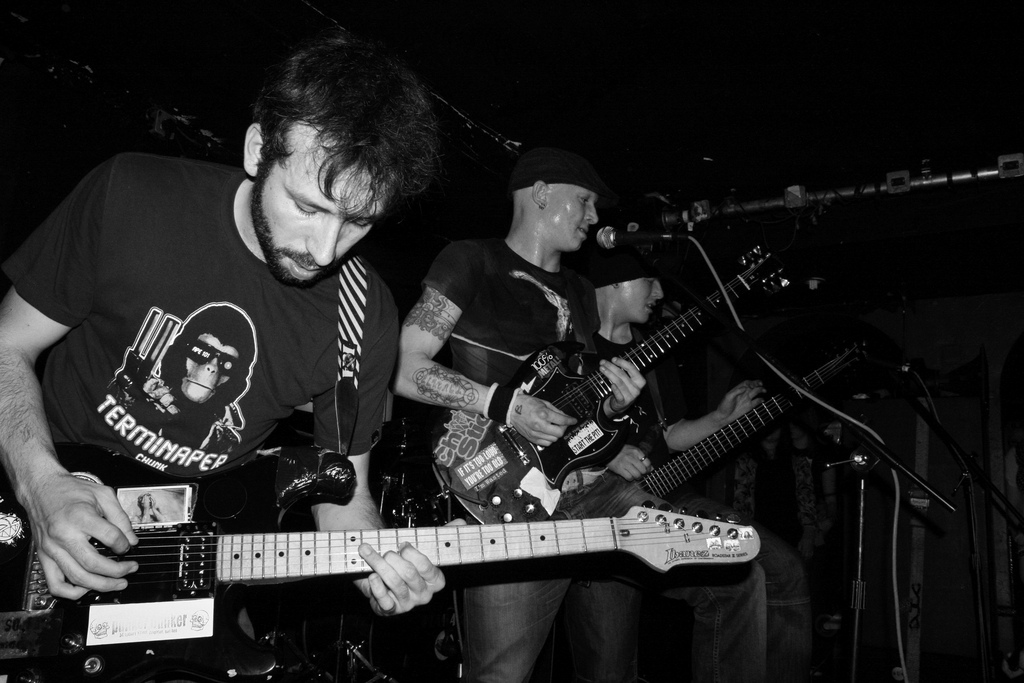
- InMe performing live in 2010

Background information
- Also known as: Drowned
- Origin: Brentwood, Essex, England
- Genres: Alternative rock; alternative metal; post-grunge
- Years active: 1996–present
- Labels: Graphite; Northern Music; Killing Moon
- Members: Dave McPherson; Gazz Marlow; Tom Dalton; John O'Keeffe; Mike Garrett
- Past members: Joe Morgan; Ben Konstantinovic; Simon Taylor; Greg McPherson
- Website: inmeofficial.co.uk

InMe are an English alternative rock and metal band originally formed in Brentwood, Essex in 1996. They have released seven studio albums, two EPs, one bootleg album, one best-of compilation, one live album, one live EP and an acoustic album. A DVD of the band's Overgrown Eden show at the Highbury Garage in November 2010 was released via PledgeMusic as a part of the band's campaign for their fifth album The Pride. The band has had eight singles appear on the UK top 100 singles chart. The band are open about the fact that they all have day jobs, and ask fans to support them financially.

== History ==
=== Formation (1996–2000) ===
The group originally formed as Drowned in 1996 when many of the band were just 14 years old. The members of the band at that time were Dave McPherson as guitarist / vocalist, Joe Morgan as bassist / backing vocalist and Simon Taylor as drummer. They played several local venues, getting their first interviews and airplay on Brentwood-based radio station, Phoenix FM. They recorded many unreleased tracks such as "acid drop" and "apricot" The band scored their break when a scout from MFN caught the end of one of their sets, whilst attending a gig to see another band called -ism. They signed with MFN in 2001, and changed their name to InMe to avoid confusion with Drowned, an American Christian rock band of the same name.

=== Overgrown Eden (2001–2003) ===
Overgrown Eden was released through Music for Nations in January 2003, after numerous delays. It reached No. 15 in the UK Albums Chart, and No. 1 in the UK Rock Albums Chart.

Four singles were released from Overgrown Eden. These were "Underdose", "Firefly", "Crushed Like Fruit" and "Neptune", the first three of these being issued before the album. "Underdose" was released in July 2002 and entered the UK Singles Chart at No. 66. This was followed by "Firefly" in September which peaked at No. 43. "Crushed Like Fruit" appeared in January 2003, charting at No. 25. "Neptune" was the last single released from the album in April 2003, charting at No. 46, and was accompanied with a video featuring fans at a live gig.

Music for Nations went out of business during 2004, when they were absorbed into a parent company. During this time the rights for Overgrown Eden were lost, and because of this, the album was eventually re-released in June 2006 when those rights were re-obtained. InMe played Overgrown Eden in its entirety in two separate dates in November 2010 as a part of a greatest hits tour to support their "best-of" album Phoenix: The Best Of InMe. The London show was recorded and was initially intended to be released through Sony BMG as a part of a re-release of Overgrown Eden. The DVD was eventually released through Graphite Records in 2012 along with the band's 5th Album The Pride.

=== White Butterfly (2004–2005) ===
Their second album, White Butterfly, was released on 20 June 2005. It was released in two forms in the UK, a standard edition with thirteen tracks, and a limited edition with two bonus tracks "Every Whisper Aches" and "Angels with Snipers". The first single from White Butterfly was "Faster The Chase" in 2004, when the band were still with MFN. Before the release of the album, there was a leak where several tracks, due to be released for the first time on the album were downloaded. The first in-store single to be released on the new label was "7 Weeks" which reached No. 36 in the UK chart, whilst the second single, "So You Know", peaked at No. 33. The release of White Butterfly was sandwiched between a tour of the UK. White Butterfly was produced by Josh Abraham and Colin Richardson.

The band released a double A-side download single "White Butterfly" / "Safe In a Room" on 19 December 2005, with a five-track live EP.

White Butterfly was played in its entirety at two of InMe's shows on their greatest hits tour in November 2010.

=== Caught: White Butterfly and Daydream Anonymous (2005–2007) ===
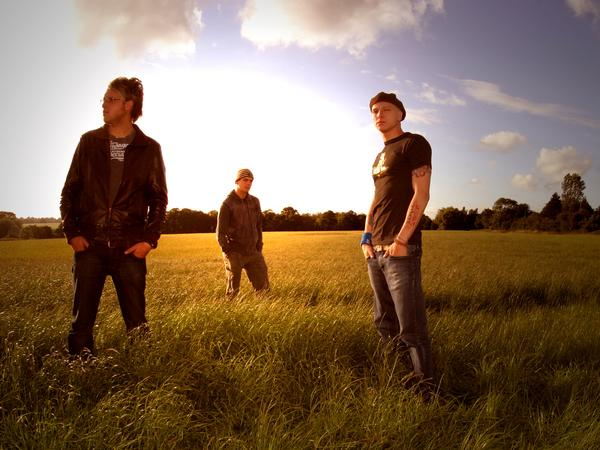
InMe in 2007

A live album, titled Caught: White Butterfly was recorded at the London Astoria in December 2005, and released in August 2006. The live DVD, White Butterfly Caught Live, which was released in October 2006. In 2006, Joe Morgan left the band following the end of the tour cycle for White Butterfly and went to study at university, being replaced by Dave's younger brother Greg McPherson.

In September 2007, InMe released their third album Daydream Anonymous. It charted in the UK at No. 71, making it the lowest charting InMe album to date. Daydream Anonymous featured thirteen tracks. "I Won't Let Go" was released as the only single. Daydream Anonymous was played in its entirety on two nights of InMe's greatest hits tour in December. It marked a shift in style towards a more technical, progressive and complex sound and exhibited a massive improvement in all members' technical abilities as instrumentalists.

=== Herald Moth (2008–2010) ===
Herald Moth was recorded at Chapel Studios and the band finished recording the album in February 2009. It was released on 14 September through Graphite Records, and peaked at No. 68 in the UK chart. The album's first single, "Single of the Weak", was released on 17 August.

Herald Moth was InMe's first album as a four piece band, following the addition of Ben Konstantinovic in 2008. The band toured extensively through Europe from early 2009 to 2010, and saw Konstantinovic leaving in October 2009, to be replaced by Gazz Marlow in February the following year.

A double A-side single "All Terrain Vehicle" / "Nova Armada" was released in June 2010, with an accompanying video for "Nova Armada". Marlow's first recording with the band was with him playing second guitar on an acoustic version of "Nova Armada". With Marlow operating exclusively as a guitarist for the time being, backing vocal duties remained solely with Greg McPherson. InMe went on a 20 date run of the UK (known as the "All Terrain Armada Tour") to promote the album, with support from Fei Comodo and Envy Of The State.

InMe played Herald Moth in its entirety at both the Firebug in Leicester and The Relentless Garage in London in December 2010. InMe also headlined the Strongbow Stage at the Sonisphere festival at Knebworth in July 2010, and appeared at the Summer Breeze Festival in Germany in August.

=== Phoenix: The Best of InMe (2010) ===
Their best of compilation album, Phoenix: The Best of InMe, included 15 tracks: three tracks from each of the band's four studio albums and three new recordings. The new tracks were recorded in June 2010, with Fei Comodo guitarist Mike Curtis producing. They were entitled "Saccharine Arcadia", "Thanks for Believing Me" and "Bury Me Deep Beneath Your Skin". The album was released on 27 September 2010.

The accompanying tour saw the band take up a four night residency at The Relentless Garage in London in November and December 2010, playing each of their four studio albums already released at that time in their entirety in consecutive weeks.

=== Overgrown Eden DVD release and The Pride (2010–2012) ===
Following the airing of Overgrown Eden at the Highbury Garage in November on the Phoenix tour, the show (which was filmed) is to be released on DVD through Sony BMG. In a 2011 interview with Live4guitar, InMe confirmed that this DVD should be released as part of the PledgeMusic Campaign, which launches in November 2011. The band made an appearance on the Bohemia Stage on Sunday 10 July at Sonisphere Knebworth.

As was frequently confirmed by Dave McPherson on social networking site Facebook as well as on the microblogging site Twitter, InMe planned to spend the early part of 2011 working on their fifth album, which was planned for release in February 2012. The album is to be supported by a PledgeMusic campaign launching on 25 November 2011. The album exhibits a completely different sound to its predecessor Herald Moth and has been described was "euphoric, uplifting and very positive" both by Dave McPherson and lead guitarist Gazz Marlow in the buildup to the album's release. In November 2011 'A Great Man' was released as a free download single via Pledge Music.

The album was released on 19 February 2012, InMe released their fifth studio album The Pride. Their PledgeMusic campaign got 314% - a percentage of which went towards the charity The Alzheimer's Society. In the UK Albums Chart it reached No. 60, and also reached No. 8 on the UK indie chart.

InMe uploaded 'Pantheon', the first single from 'The Pride' in March 2012. It was uploaded onto YouTube following an exclusive release via the Big Cheese magazine website. A video for Moonlit Seabed, the second official single from the album, was shot in September–October 2012 and released via YouTube on 27 November. On 16 December 2012, InMe also released Medusa through their BandCamp page without any prior notice, which is an additional album that was home recorded as part of a PledgeMusic incentive.

=== Centiment debut album (2013–2014) ===
In 2013 the tech-metal band Centiment, featuring Dave McPherson, Greg McPherson and Gazz Marlow of InMe, with Neil Howard and Mark Shurety, released their debut single "Defenders of Oasis". This was followed by the debut album Streets of Rage in 2014.

=== The Destinations EP and Triple Album (2014–2015) ===
In 2014 InMe released a 4-track EP titled The Destinations EP, first via PledgeMusic and later for general release. This was followed by a UK tour to promote the EP in May 2014, supported by The Red Paintings. The band has announced via social media that they are to release a new triple album beginning in 2015. The project is titled Trilogy and will consist of three albums. The first, a soft rock album, the second a melodic rock album, and the third a heavy metal album. The first, titled Trilogy: Dawn, was released on 4 May 2015, with the PledgeMusic campaign launching on 3 April. On 9 March, the band released the first song from the triple album to their fans, titled Trauma: Door Slam Crescendo.

=== Departure of Simon Taylor (2017) ===
On 13 October 2017, drummer Simon Taylor announced he was leaving InMe to focus on other ventures. On 10 November 2017, InMe announced that Tom Dalton would be joining as their new drummer.

InMe performed two shows with Scottish rockers Gun at the end of 2017, which were Dalton's first shows with the band.

=== Discontinuation of Trilogy, Jumpstart Hope and addition of John O'Keeffe (2018–present) ===
On 2 November 2018, InMe announced via social media that they would be releasing their 7th studio album called Jumpstart Hope in 2019. In the same post InMe confirmed they would not be continuing with Trilogy.

On 22 July 2019, the band announced that they had added their long-time merch guy John O'Keeffe to the band as an additional rhythm guitarist.

Finishing 2018 with a UK tour alongside A and Wheatus, InMe started 2019 with a string of sold out UK headline dates and will be embarking on another headline UK tour in September 2019, ahead of their Jumpstart Hope album release.

On 3 January 2020, InMe released "Shame" on Spotify from their upcoming album Jumpstart Hope.

Jumpstart Hope was released on 17 January 2020, and reached #10 in the UK Rock Albums official chart.

InMe announced that Greg McPherson was leaving the band on 6 July 2021.

InMe announced that Mike Garrett had been announced as Greg McPherson's replacement on 6 December 2021.

On March 26 2024 InMe announced the upcoming release of their 7th studio album Demons. Set to be released later in 2024.

In 2025, McPherson collaborated with Dutch Americana artist TuskHead on the single "One Night Show", combining Americana and rock influences.

== Discography ==
=== Studio albums ===
List of albums, with selected chart positions
Title	Album details	Peak chart positions			
Title	Album details	UK	UK Rock	UK Indie	SCO
Overgrown Eden	Released: 27 January 2003; Label: Music For Nations; Formats: CD, digital download	15	1	3	16
White Butterfly	Released: 20 June 2005; Label: V2 Records; Formats: CD, digital download	56	4	4	67
Daydream Anonymous	Released: 10 September 2007; Label: Graphite Records; Formats: CD, digital download	71	2	-	91
Herald Moth	Released: 14 September 2009; Label: Graphite Records; Formats: CD, digital download	68	7	-	-
The Pride	Released: 19 February 2012; Label: Graphite Records; Formats: CD, digital download	60	-	8	90
Trilogy: Dawn	Released: 4 May 2015; Label: Independent; Formats: CD, digital download	-	-	-	-
Jumpstart Hope	Released: 17 January 2020; Label: Killing Moon Records; Formats: Vinyl, CD, digital download	-	10	27	-

=== Compilations ===
List of albums, with selected chart positions
Title	Album details	Peak chart positions
Title	Album details	UK Rock
Phoenix: The Very Best of InMe	Released: 27 September 2010; Label: Graphite Records / Northern Music; Formats: CD, digital download	26

=== Live ===
List of albums, with selected chart positions
Title	Album details	Peak chart positions	
Title	Album details	UK Rock	UK Indie
Caught: White Butterfly	Released: 14 August 2006; Label: Secret Record Limited; Formats: CD, digital download	24	13
iTunes Live: London Festival '08	Released: 16 August 2008; Label: iTunes; Formats: digital download	–	–

=== Bootlegs ===
Year	Album details
2012	Medusa: Released: 16 December 2012; Label: Independent; Formats: CD, digital download

=== EPs ===
Year	Album details
2014	The Destinations EP: Released: 1 June 2014; Label: Independent; Formats: CD, digital download

=== Singles ===
Title	Year	Peak chart positions				Album
Title	Year	UK	UK Indie	UK Rock	SCO	Album
"Underdose"	2002	66	8	7	83	Overgrown Eden
"Firefly"	2002	43	6	7	48	Overgrown Eden
"Crushed Like Fruit"	2003	25	6	2	37	Overgrown Eden
"Neptune"	2003	46	2	4	46	Overgrown Eden
"Faster the Chase"	2004	31	2	3	30	White Butterfly
"Otherside"	2005	— (Note: "Otherside" did not enter the UK Singles Chart, but peaked at number 29 on the UK on the UK Singles Downloads Chart.)	—	—	—	White Butterfly
"7 Weeks"	2005	36	5	2	—	White Butterfly
"So You Know"	2005	33	4	1	21	White Butterfly
"I Won't Let Go"	2007	77	—	2	24	Daydream Anonymous
"Single of the Weak"	2009	—	—	—	—	Herald Moth
"All Terrain Vehicle / Nova Armada"	2010	—	—	—	—	Herald Moth
"Pantheon"	2012	—	—	—	—	The Pride
"Moonlit Seabed"	2012	—	—	—	—	The Pride
"Hymn: Ivory Elder"	2015	—	—	—	—	Trilogy: Dawn
"Rapture: Land of The Secret Rose"	2015	—	—	—	—	Trilogy: Dawn
"Amnesty: Bonsai Forest"	2015	—	—	—	—	Trilogy: Dawn
"For Something to Happen"	2018	—	—	—	—	Jumpstart Hope
"The Next Song"	2019-20	—	—	—	—	Jumpstart Hope
"Blood Orange Lake"	2019-20	—	—	—	—	Jumpstart Hope
"I Swear"	2019-20	—	—	—	—	Jumpstart Hope
"Shame"	2019-20	—	—	—	—	Jumpstart Hope
