= Last One Standing (album) =

Studio album by I Divide
- Released: 14 April 2014
- Genre: Post-hardcore
- Length: 43:29
- Label: Destroy Everything

I Divide chronology
What's Worth More (2011)	Last One Standing (2014)

Last One Standing is the debut album by British rock band I Divide, released on 14 April 2014 by Destroy Everything records.

== History ==
The band announced their debut album in February 2014, where they revealed the album's title, Last One Standing, its artwork, its track listing and its release date, being 14 April the same year. Before the album was released, it was made available for streaming online one week prior. When the album was finally released, it entered the UK's top 40 Rock and Metal albums chart at 34. After the album's release, the band toured with British rock band Blitz Kids as a support act in support of the release. The album was distributed both digitally and physically.

== Critical reception ==
Professional ratings
Review scores
Source	Rating
AltSounds	70%
Hit the Floor	4.5/5 stars
Ourzone Magazine	8/10

The album received a positive response from critics. AltSound's Chris Maguire called the band ambitions, calling the album a mixture of alternative rock and post-hardcore, praising the album's creativity, use of lyrics and the band's vocalist, Tom Kavanagh. Antoine Omisore of HitTheFloor gave the album its highest rating of 4.5 stars, praising its overall use of catchy guitar riffs and destructive drumming and overall grooves. Charlotte Willcocks from Ourzone Magazine liked the band's use of more mature screaming techniques opposed to the typical hardcore ones, and also called the album anthemic and melodic, also praising the album's range of tempo.

== Track listing ==
No.	Title	Length
1.	"Follow Me"	3:45
2.	"Tell Me Something"	3:27
3.	"I'm Not Leaving"	3:50
4.	"Monster In me"	3:53
5.	"Cold At The Bottom"	4:13
6.	"Living In A Hurricane"	3:43
7.	"27 Down" (featuring Rebecca Need-Menear)	3:51
8.	"Run Away"	3:50
9.	"Say It isn't So"	3:47
10.	"Let Go"	4:11
11.	"Look At Me Now"	4:59

== Chart positions ==
Chart	Peak
UK Rock	34
