= LAB Records =

English independent record label

- Founded: 2007
- Founder: Mark Orr
- Distributor: ADA
- Genre: Pop; rock; indie rock; alternative rock; emo; pop rock; pop punk
- Country of origin: United Kingdom
- Location: Manchester
- Official website: labrecs.com

LAB Records (pronounced /læb/ lab) is an independent record label operating from Manchester, England, and founded by Mark Orr and Nathen McVittie in 2007. The company also has a creative and distribution division, LAB Exposure, as well as a New York–based management company, LAB Partners.

It releases music in the pop and rock genres, with bands primarily from the United States and UK.

== History ==
=== 2005–2008: Founding ===
LAB Promotions put on a number of shows in the Blackpool area during 2006 to 2008 – featuring the likes of Kill The Arcade, Out of Sight, Tellison, Encyclopedia, My First Tooth – and many bands who later became the first artists on the LAB Records roster: MiMi Soya, The Honeymoon Suite and Lost on Campus.

Having moved to University in Manchester, Orr teamed up with McVittie to release their first record in July 2007, a six-track CD by Stamford singer-songwriter Rob Lynch, aka Lost on Campus. Soon, the label became number one priority and made their first major breakthrough with the signing of Brighton’s MiMi Soya in March 2008. The female-fronted band released their debut EP The Four Penny Knee Trembler in June 2008 and it has sold more than 5,000 units to date.

=== 2009–2011: Expansion ===
In May 2009, the label went full-time in a new office, and launched their sister clothing line, LAB Apparel.

In the meantime, the label signed a second artist coming out of Brighton, UK – four-piece pop-rock band The Auteur. The band released a single and an EP through the label before playing a number of high-profile festivals in Summer 2009 – Download Festival, T In The Park Festival and Underage Festival.

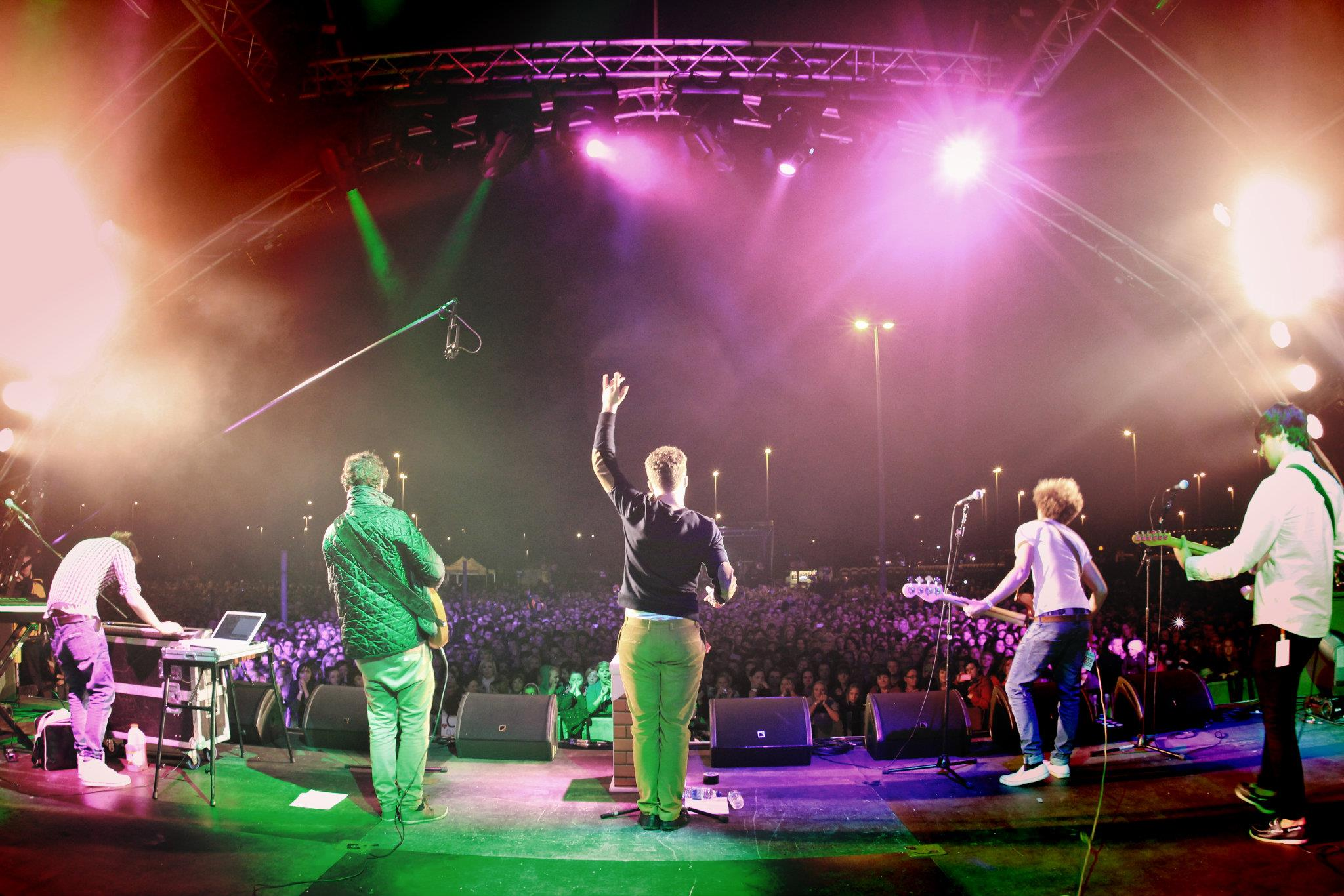
British indie pop band Young Kato (seen performing in 2011) are signed to the label

In July 2009 the label released their highest-selling store release to date, It Hates You by North Carolina rock band He Is Legend. The record was co-released with American label Tragic Hero Records. Also in August, The Morning Of signed a 50–50 worldwide deal with LAB/Tragic Hero.

In November 2009, Pegasus Bridge's "Yoko" single secured the label's first prime time Radio 1 airtime when Huw Stephens premiered the track. The band went on to enjoy airplay from the likes of Zane Lowe and Vernon Kaye, as well as playing Radio 1's Big Weekend in Bangor, Wales in May 2010. Episode 3 of the label's LABtv series relates to One Big Weekend.

At the end of 2009 the label secured its first investment, though it remains entirely independent. The label also doubled its 2008 sales in 2009.

=== 2010–2013 ===
As of May 2010, the video for Not Advised's single "The World's Not Ready" gave the label its first national television exposure after it premiered on Kerrang! TV. It went on to be featured on Scuzz, Lava and Starz Television and is available to request on all of these channels. Also, in, May 2010, the label released its first record in US stores, The Morning Of's The Way I Fell In. The album debuted at number 10 in the Billboard Heatseekers Chart, selling 2100 copies first week. In June 2010, the label signed New York pop/rock band Just Surrender in the UK/EU.

In August 2010, Mark Orr conducted an interview with Punktastic.com in which he discussed the history of the label and their intention to move towards a more mainstream sound in 2011. "Our sound will go a little more poppy but I'm keen we retain our rock side too. I'm so keen that we can't be pigeon-holed and so we will have an eclectic roster."

Nathen McVittie announced via Twitter that he had left the company in September 2010. In October 2010, the label had signed Arizona pop-rock band The Summer Set and would release Love Like This in the UK and Europe in early 2011.

While We're Young, the debut mini-album release from Pegasus Bridge, received iTunes front page placement following its November 2010 release and entered the iTunes chart, peaking at number 81. The band toured with Anberlin in November.

In December 2010, Not Advised toured Ireland and some of the UK with You Me at Six and released "The ARK," the third single from their mini album After The Fight. It went on to feature prominently on the Scuzz playlist.

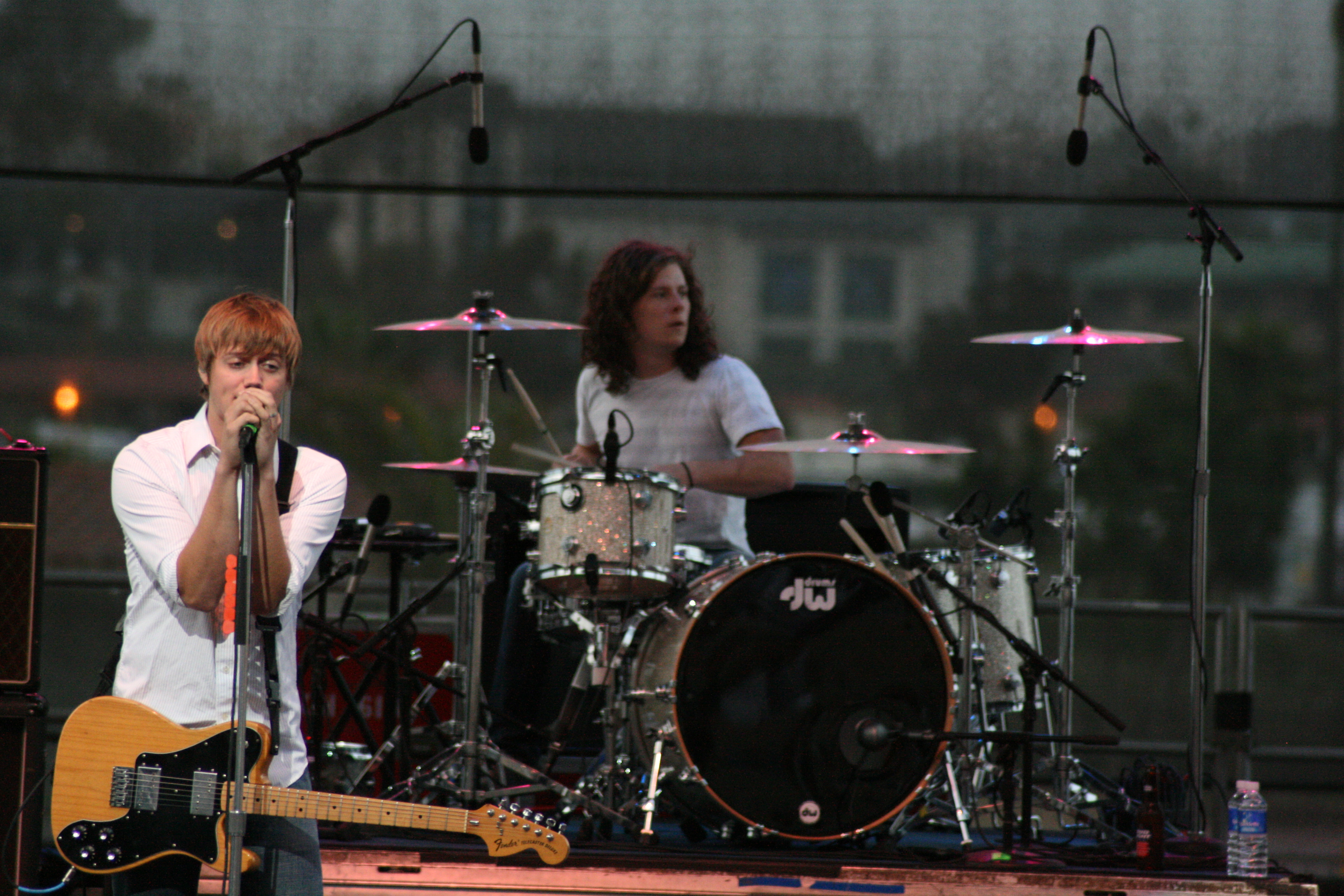
Pop punk band Cartel is signed to the label

On 29 January 2011, Charlee Drew performed in the BBC Radio 1 Live Lounge with Skepta ahead of the release of the latter's new album Doin' It Again which features Drew on the track "Taking Too Long" and entered the official UK album chart at number 19.

On 24 June 2011, Pegasus Bridge announced they would be going on an indefinite hiatus. The news led to them trending fourth worldwide on Twitter. The band played their final show in September 2011 at Sound Control, Manchester.

The label released a deluxe version of the Cartel EP In Stereo in the UK & Europe on 20 May 2012. It featured the five original songs as well as acoustic versions and one unreleased track, "No Motivation." Cartel also collaborated with LAB on their 2013 full-length, Collider.

On 4 January 2013 it was announced the label had signed London rock band Anavae to a worldwide deal and would release their single "Storm Chaser". The single reached number 33 on the UK rock singles chart.

In March 2013 the label announced the signing of Illinois indie band The Hush Sound, the first LAB artist to be played on BBC Radio 2.

In April 2013 Young Kato performed on the first episode of season 5 of Made in Chelsea resulting in their LAB-released self-titled EP reaching number 31 on the iTunes album chart.

=== 2014–2016 ===
Two LAB affiliated artists, Young Kato (BMG Chrysalis), and Katie Sky (Universal Music Group) both signed to larger labels during 2013. At the start of 2014, the label added new artists to its roster: William Beckett, The LaFontaines, Fort Hope (previously My Passion), and Jacob & Goliath, and announced it had signed Katie Sky to its LAB Partners management firm. They have also worked with the critically acclaimed act Bipolar Sunshine, formerly known as frontman Adio Merchant of the indie band Kid British.

Later in the year the label announced the signing of singer-songwriter Mike Dignam, who had joined 5 Seconds Of Summer on their tours of the UK and Australia, and Barbados quartet Cover Drive, known for having five top 40 UK hits.

In April 2015, Fort Hope's single 'Plans' was made Track of the Day on BBC Radio 1 before being added to the in New Music We Trust playlist.

=== Since 2017 ===
In 2017, LAB was nominated for 'Best Small Label' at the AIM Awards.

Later that year, on the label’s 10th anniversary, LAB signed a worldwide distribution deal with Warner Music Group’s ADA.

== Notable staff ==
- Mark Orr – Founder and Director
- Matt Sayward – A&R
- Duncan Howsley – Creative Marketing Director
- Scott Brothman – Managing Director

== Artists ==
=== Current ===
- ARLO
- Bessie Turner
- Blondes
- Dead Pony
- HalfNoise
- Hockey Dad
- Island Club
- Jim Junior
- Katie Sky
- KYKO
- The Lathums
- The K's
- Lizzie Esau
- Marsicans
- Martin Luke Brown
- Novacub
- The New Coast
- Now, Now
- Retro Video Club
- Seb Lowe
- Second Thoughts
- SHOR
- South Arcade
- Stereo Honey
- The Sukis
- The Summer Set
- Sunset Sons
- Swim School
- Talia Mar
- Tigress
- Vistas
- Vukovi

=== Alumni ===
- Adam Barnes
- Adelaide
- Áine Cahill
- Anavae
- April Towers
- The Auteur
- Beach Weather
- Bethan Leadley
- Blitz Kids
- BOA
- Cape Cub
- Cartel
- Cassia
- Charlee Drew
- Clarkson
- Clay
- Confide
- Dan Owen
- Eat Sleep Attack
- Edward Lewis
- Eve Belle
- Fort Hope
- FutureProof
- Haus
- He Is Legend
- Hellogoodbye
- The Hush Sound
- The Honeymoon Suite
- I the Mighty
- Jacob & Goliath
- Jeremy Ashida
- Josue Coto
- Just Surrender
- Kid British
- The LaFontaines
- Lost on Campus
- Lost on Landing
- Mike Dignam
- MiMi Soya
- The Morning Of
- My Actions Your Exit
- Natasha North
- Natives
- The Night Life Crisis
- Not Advised
- Pegasus Bridge
- Portia Conn
- SKIES
- Sykes
- The Summer Set
- The Van Ts
- William Beckett
- Witterquick
- Young Kato
- Youth Club

== See also ==
- List of independent UK record labels
