= The Cape Race =

Five-piece rock band from Manchester, United Kingdom

- The Cape Race in Morecambe, 2013.

Background information
- Origin: Manchester, England, UK
- Genres: Rock, Alternative rock, Emo
- Years active: 2009–present
- Labels: Ten Letters; LAB Records
- Members: David Moloney; Matt Sayward; Adam Lewis; Scott Perkins; Jonny Davys
- Website: thecaperace.com

The Cape Race are an English five-piece rock band from Manchester. They formed in September 2009.

== Member history and formation ==
The members of The Cape Race came together from being part of different bands in the Manchester scene. David and Jonny were respectively singing and drumming in a band called No Standards when they played a show with a band called Grayson's Hour. Playing in Grayson's Hour at the time was Scott Perkins, as well as Joe Lennox and Adam Morris, who between the five of them formed a new band called The Honeymoon Suite in 2006. The Honeymoon Suite self-released The Matrimony EP later that year, and quickly made quite a name for themselves by winning an Ernie Ball Battle of the Bands competition to open the Taste of Chaos tour with Taking Back Sunday, Anti-Flag, Underoath, Alexisonfire, Senses Fail, Saosin and Cancer Bats. Adam Morris left the band in 2008 and was replaced initially by Thom Greensill, who was then ultimately replaced by Matt Sayward. The band signed with LAB Records (Hellogoodbye, The Morning Of, Just Surrender, The Summer Set) and recorded a sophomore release Calm Your Little Passions at Stakeout Studios with producer Jason Wilson. The band were seen on the live circuit all over the UK with the likes of You Me at Six, Kids in Glass Houses, A Day to Remember, The Blackout, The Hold Steady, We Are the Ocean, Spitalfield, This Providence, Young Guns and Canterbury before splitting in 2009 and forming The Cape Race to pursue a different creative direction. Matt had met Adam as a guitar player in 2004 and asked him to come on board as bassist.

== Announcement of the band & Now, Voyager (2009-2012) ==
The band were revealed in November 2009 with a 4-track self-recorded demo and a short tour of the North of England with former LAB Records labelmates Lost on Landing and Rob Lynch. They spent the majority of 2010 writing for their debut release, and were seen live across the country with the likes of The Cribs, Badly Drawn Boy, The 1975, Liam Frost, Parachute, Futures, Tellison, Get Cape. Wear Cape. Fly, Don Broco, The Dangerous Summer, Fireworks, Make Do and Mend, Tiger Please, Yuck, Blitz Kids, Francesqa, and Pegasus Bridge.

In October 2010 the band entered Earth Terminal Studios to record their debut mini-album Now, Voyager with producer Peter Miles. On 27 December the band announced the record via a video on their official website and plans to make a promotional video for every single track on the record.

The first single from the record, "They're Young, They're in Love" was released on 1 January 2011. and also earned the band a spotlight feature on popular music site AbsolutePunk.net. The second single, "Little Whites" was released on 4 April 2011.

On 1 June 2011, the band launched the release campaign for the full mini-album Now, Voyager. It was offered as a free download, a little over a month ahead of its release on 4 July. As it started to hit email inboxes at midnight (GMT) on 4 July, the record had seen in excess of 10,000 pre-orders.

The band announced a third single and video for "The Reprieve" shortly afterwards. The music video premiered exclusively at Rock Sound on 13 July.

== "Digging For Gold" and other singles (2012-2013) ==
The band began to tease what appeared to be artwork for their first new music following Now, Voyager in January 2013 via their Instagram account. On 19 February 2013, the single "Digging For Gold" was released. The band premiered a music video for another new single, "Home Truths", with Rock Sound magazine.

== Home, Truths (debut album) (2014-present) ==
The band recorded their debut album at Middle Farm Studios with producer Peter Miles (Dry The River, The King Blues, We Are the Ocean, Canterbury). Prior to release, the band confirmed that the record would include their singles released through 2013 and earlier. The band launched a pre-order for the album on 15 July 2014, which gave fans an immediate download of a new song entitled "You Should Have Known". On 10 August, The 405 premiered the album on their website. The next day, Home, Truths was officially released, reaching #34 on the iTunes alternative chart.

== Band members ==
- David Moloney – vocals
- Matt Sayward – guitar
- Adam Lewis – bass, vocals
- Scott Perkins – guitar
- Jonny Davys – drums
- Daniel Finney – keyboard

== Discography ==
Date	Title	Type
1 January 2011	"They're Young, They're in Love"	Single
4 April 2011	"Little Whites"	Single
4 July 2011	Now, Voyager	Mini-Album
19 August 2011	"The Reprieve"	Single
19 February 2013	"Digging For Gold"	Single
27 January 2014	"Home Truths"	Single
15 July 2014	"You Should Have Known"	Single
11 August 2014	Home, Truths	Album
