= Now Voyager (disambiguation) =

Now Voyager may refer to:

- Now, Voyager (album), the 2011 mini-album by The Cape Race
- Now, Voyager, the 1942 film starring Bette Davis
- Now Voyager, the 1984 solo album by Barry Gibb
- The Source (musician), who used Now Voyager as an alias
