= Thanks for Nothing =

Thanks for Nothing may refer to:

== Albums ==
- Thanks for Nothing (Rosemary Clooney album) or the title song, "Thanks for Nothing (At All)", 1964
- Thanks for Nothing, by Funker Vogt, 1996
- Thanks 4 Nothing, a 2023 album by Tink

== Songs ==
- "Thanks for Nothing", by Dope from Life, 2001
- "Thanks for Nothing", by the Downtown Fiction, 2011
- "Thanks for Nothing", by Fefe Dobson from Joy, 2010
- "Thanks for Nothing", by Go Radio from Do Overs and Second Chances, 2010
- "Thanks for Nothing", by Ligeia from Bad News, 2008
- "Thanks for Nothing", by My Passion from Corporate Flesh Party, 2009
- "Thanks for Nothing", by Napalm Death from Enemy of the Music Business, 2000
- "Thanks for Nothing", by Slaves on Dope from Inches from the Mainline, 2000
- "Thanks for Nothing", by Sum 41 from Does This Look Infected?, 2002
- "Thanks for Nothing", by Tribe of Judah from Exit Elvis, 2002

== Other media ==
- "Thanks for Nothing" (Grace Under Fire), a 1995 TV episode
- "Thanks for Nothing" (Martin), a 1993 TV episode
- Thanks for Nothing: The Jack Dee Memoirs, a 2009 book by Jack Dee
- Thanks for Nothing, a book by Laura Dower from the children's series From the Files of Madison Finn

== See also ==
- TFN (disambiguation)
