= Fort Hope (disambiguation) =

Fort Hope is a musical group from the United Kingdom.

Fort Hope may also refer to:

- Fort Hope, Ontario, an Ojibwe First Nations band government in Kenora District, Ontario, Canada
  - Fort Hope Airport
- Fort Hope, the original outpost of Hudson Bay Company at Hope, British Columbia, Canada
- "Fort Hope", an episode of Space Rangers

== See also ==
- Fort Good Hope, Northwest Territories, Canada
- House of Hope (fort), a Dutch settlement in what is now Hartford, Connecticut
