= TFN =

TFN may refer to:

== Arts and entertainment ==
- TFN (boy band), South Korea
- The Fight Network, a Canadian MMA channel
- The Football Network, a channel in Louisiana, US
- TheForce.Net, a Star Wars news site
- Twelve Foot Ninja, an Australian metal band

== Businesses and organisations ==
- TFN Group, a French facility management company
- Texas Freedom Network, religious freedom and civil liberties group
- The Freecycle Network, a worldwide organisation promoting reuse of goods instead of disposal
- Transport for the North, styled TfN, a transport agency in the United Kingdom
- Trust for Nature, Victoria, Australia

== Places ==
- Tenerife North–Ciudad de La Laguna Airport, Spain (IATA:TFN)
- Thornton Fractional North High School, Calumet City, Illinois, US
- Tsawwassen First Nation, Canada

== Other uses ==
- Tax file number, of the Australian Taxation Office
- Toll free number, a free telephone number
- Transferrin, a protein
- Tribe Flood Network, a DDoS hacking tool
- Dena'ina language of Alaska (ISO 639: tfn)

== See also ==
- Thanks for Nothing (disambiguation)
