= I Divide =

British post-hardcore band

- Origin: Exeter, England
- Genres: Post-hardcore
- Years active: 2011–present
- Labels: Destroy Everything
- Members: Kristen Hughes; Dave Mooney; Tom Kavanagh; Henry Selley; Josh Wreford
- Website: idivideband.com

I Divide are a British post-hardcore band from Exeter. They released their debut album, Last One Standing, in 2014

== History ==
=== 2011–2014: Early years and What's Worth More ===
The band was formed in 2011 in Exeter, England with original members; Kristen Hughes, Dave Mooney, Tom Kavanagh, Henry Selley and Josh Wreford.

They released their first mini album, titled 'What's Worth More', the same year in October independently. After the release, the band entered the Red Bull 'Bedroom Jam' tenement in early 2014, and in April, the band won the tournament, making them the 12th band to do so. Later that year, the band was announced as a support act for Funeral for a Friend's UK tour during January and February 2013. The band signed to 'Destroy Everything Records' in March 2013 when the label itself was announced.

=== 2014–present: Last One Standing ===
The band announced their debut album in February 2014, where they revealed the album's title, 'Last One Standing', its artwork, its track listing and its release date, being 14 April the same year. In March and early April, the band supported post-hardcore band Yashin on their UK tour.

Before 'Last One Standing' was released, it was made available for streaming online one week prior. When the album was finally released, it entered the UK's top 40 Rock and Metal albums chart at 34. After the album's release, the band toured with British rock band Blitz Kids as a support act in support of the release.

== Members ==
- Kristen Hughes – bass
- Dave Mooney – drums
- Tom Kavanagh – lead vocals
- Henry Selley – guitar
- Josh Wreford – guitar, backing vocals

== Discography ==
I Divide discography
- Studio albums: 1
- Singles: 2
- Music videos: 6
- Mini: 1

=== Albums ===
==== Studio albums ====
| Name | Album details | Chart peaks |
| Name | Album details | UK Rock |
|---|---|---|
| Last One Standing | Released: 14 April 2014; Label: Destroy Everything; Formats: CD, digital download | 34 |

==== Mini albums ====
| Name | Album details |
|---|---|
| What's Worth More | Released: 9 October 2011; Label: Self-released; Formats: Digital download |

=== Singles ===
| Song | Year | Album |
|---|---|---|
| "Follow Me" | 2013 | Last One Standing |
| "I'm Not Leaving" | 2014 | Last One Standing |

=== Music videos ===
| Song | Year | Album | Director | Type | Link |
|---|---|---|---|---|---|
| "This Ship's Going Down" | 2011 | What's Worth More | Daniel Broadley | Live footage | |
| "The Arrival" | 2011 | What's Worth More | Unknown | Performance | |
| "Burning Out" | 2012 | What's Worth More | Daniel Broadley | Narrative | |
| "Never Be Stopped" | 2012 | What's Worth More | Unknown | Narrative | |
| "Follow Me" | 2013 | Last One Standing | Dark Fable Media | Narrative | |
| "I'm Not Leaving" | 2014 | Last One Standing | Unknown | Narrative | |
