= The Good Youth =

Studio album by Blitz Kids
- Released: 20 January 2014
- Genre: Alternative rock, pop rock, pop punk
- Label: Red Bull Records

Blitz Kids chronology
Vagrants & Vagabonds (2011)	The Good Youth (2014)

The Good Youth is the second studio album by British alternative rock band Blitz Kids and was released on 17 January 2014. It is the first full feature album through the new label Red Bull Records.

== Composition and lyrics ==
The band themselves have described the sound of the albums as being a "better" album compared to their previous efforts.

When they streamed the full album on the Rocksound website, they described every tracks meanings, all of which are based around being an inspiring album.

== Critical reception ==
Professional ratings
Review scores
Source	Rating
Bring The Noise	8/10
Ourzonemag	9/10

Bring the Noise reviewer Tamsyn Wilce praised the album's range of power and soft elements, along with the cooperation of the vocals and the guitar riffs, although criticized the song Pinnacle for the poor use of vocals and "strange synths in the background", however went on to review the rest of the album positively. The review placed them along the likes of Mallory Knox, Anberlin and The Blackout.

Ourzonemags review called the album a mixture of "anthemic rock" and "pop-infused", calling them a completely different band, stating while the band has changed, there are still elements of their previous efforts still there.

== Track listings ==
All tracks are written by Blitz Kids

No.	Title	Length
1.	"All I Want Is Everything"	3:54
2.	"Run For Cover"	3:17
3.	"On My Own"	3:08
4.	"Sometimes"	3:55
5.	"Keep Swinging"	3:35
6.	"Long Road"	4:36
7.	"Sold My Soul"	3:09
8.	"Perfect"	3:39
9.	"Pinnacle"	3:33
10.	"Title Fight"	2:46
11.	"Roll the Dice"	3:34
12.	"The Sound of a Lost Generation"	4:01

=== Deluxe Edition ===
Disc 1
No.	Title	Length
1.	"All I Want Is Everything"	3:54
2.	"Run For Cover"	3:17
3.	"On My Own"	3:08
4.	"Sometimes"	3:55
5.	"Keep Swinging"	3:35
6.	"Long Road"	4:36
7.	"Sold My Soul"	3:09
8.	"Perfect"	3:39
9.	"Pinnacle"	3:33
10.	"Title Fight"	2:46
11.	"Roll the Dice"	3:34
12.	"The Sound of a Lost Generation"	4:01
13.	"Regret"	2:40
14.	"I Don't Mind"	3:51
15.	"Sometimes" (Hadouken! remix)	4:52
16.	"Pinnacle" (CLASS remix)	4:06

Disc 2
No.	Title	Length
1.	"In The Studio Documentary"
2.	"Another World"
3.	"On My Own"
4.	"Run For Cover"
5.	"Sometimes"

== Chart performance ==
Chart	Peak position
UK Top 40 Rock & Metal Albums	5
