= Young Kato =

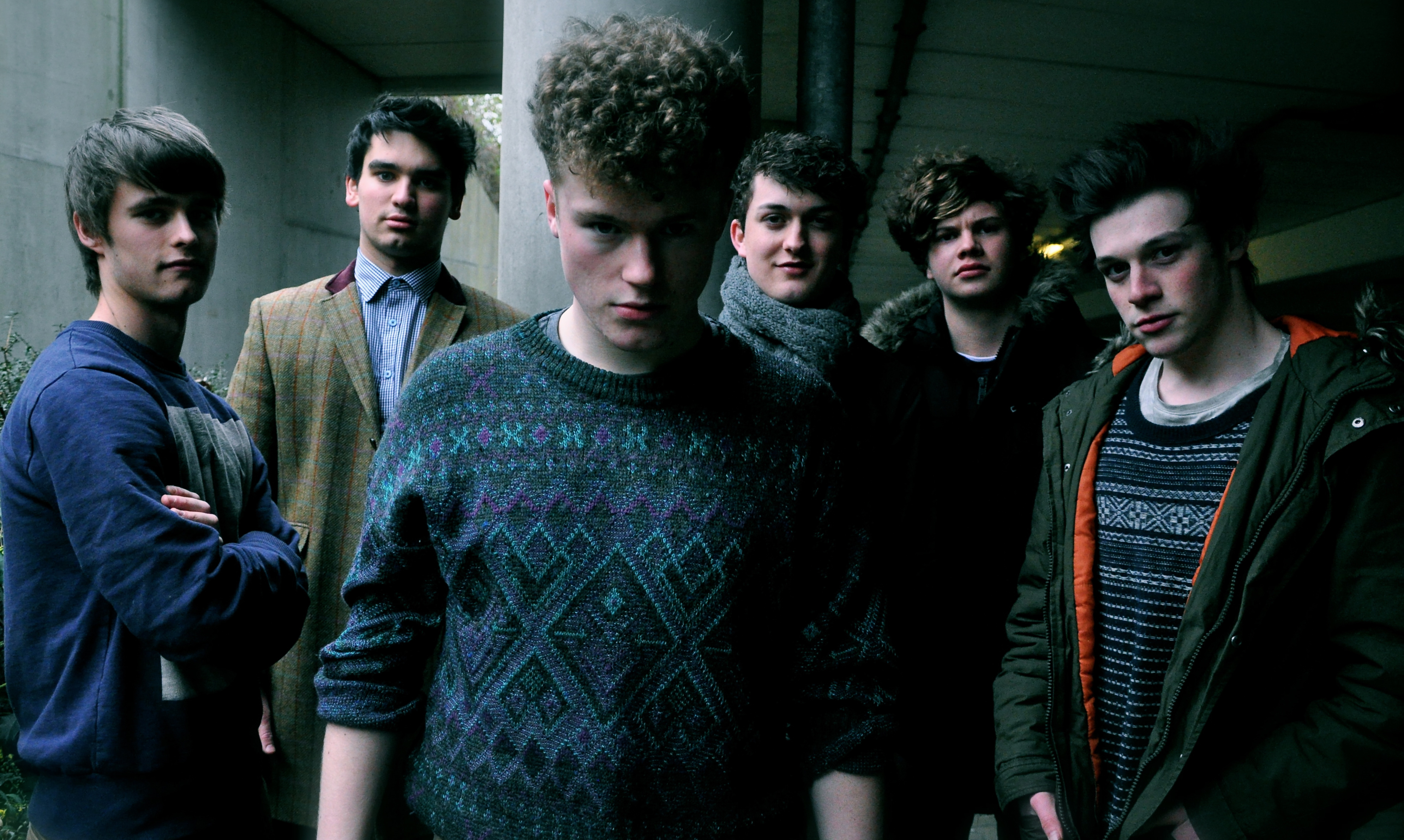

Background information
- Origin: Cheltenham, Gloucestershire and Birmingham, United Kingdom
- Genres: Indie rock, Rock, Pop, Alternative
- Years active: 2011—2017
- Labels: LAB Records, BMG Chrysalis
- Members: Tommy Wright – Vocals; Jack Edwards – Guitar; Joe Green – Guitar; Joe Lever – Bass; Harry Steele – Keyboard; Sam Henderson – Drums

Young Kato were a British six-piece indie pop band from Cheltenham, England. Formed in 2011, the band consisted of Tommy Wright, Jack Edwards, Joe Green, Joe Lever, Harry Steele and Sam Henderson.

== History ==
The band was brought together by step brothers Sam and Jack who attended different schools in Cheltenham where the band are from (with the exception of Joe Lever who lives in Birmingham). In an early interview Lever says "We got together through school and stuff basically. Sam and Jack are step brothers and so kind of brought us together… half of us went to one school where we live and the other half went to another so we just kind of knew each other and wanted to start a band."

The band started rehearsing, writing material and playing numerous gigs and smaller festival appearances around their local area including a show at Cribbs Causeway in Bristol on 2 June 2012, before releasing their debut 4 track limited edition self-titled EP via LAB Records on 26 August 2012 which reached number 31 in the iTunes albums chart on the day of release.

The band then went on to play various gigs including one off support shows with a variety of bands including One Night Only, Spector, We Are Scientists, Bastille, Peace, Swim Deep and You Me at Six. They then embarked on their first headline tour which saw them across the UK in January 2013 on a run of nine dates. It was around this time the band signed a deal with BMG Chrysalis. Shortly after, in late February, the band ventured off into Russia to play their first international show at 22.13 in St. Petersburg.

On 8 April 2013 Young Kato were featured on Made in Chelsea during Episode 1, Series 5 performing a gig at The Barfly, Camden in London. This appearance came about after the producers chose the band to feature on the programme after having featured tracks "Drink, Dance, Play" and "Life's Good" heavily in Series 4. Reflecting on the performance in an interview with Magnate Magazine, Wright made the following remarks:

Being on Made in Chelsea was really cool. We have actually been on previous series of the show, in the background, which was amazing in itself. Because the show’s music producer knew about us from playing us in the past, she reached when she was looking for a band to appear on the first episode of this series.

This increased the band's popularity and their name trended worldwide on Twitter. "Drink, Dance, Play" entered the UK Indie Chart at number eighteen.

In May 2013, the band played a few more shows including a gig with Spector in Manchester at The Deaf Institute and The Great Escape Festival in Brighton where they performed alongside The 1975 and Tribes at the Old Ship Paganini Ballroom.

Young Kato then embarked on a twenty-two date tour in May/June 2013 across the UK; this was in support of single "Something Real". "Something Real" was released on 3 June and saw the band landing support from XFM, Absolute Radio and BBC Radio 1 with DJ Zane Lowe hailing the track as his "Next Hype".

On 28 October 2013, the EP "Drink, Dance, Play" was released. The re-issued lead track which was recorded/produced/mixed by Dan Grech-Marguerat received playlisting on XFM and support from BBC Radio 1 DJ's including Fearne Cotton and Zane Lowe, reaching number 58 in the Alternative UK Airplay Chart. In November of that year, the band embarked on their biggest tour to date in support of the "Drink, Dance, Play" re-release, with the London show held at Dingwalls in Camden. Later that month they also went on to play two nights at KOKO supporting Australian pop punk band, 5 Seconds of Summer.

February 2014 saw the band's second national television performance when they appeared on CBBC programme Sam & Mark's Big Friday Wind-Up.

In March 2014 the group played a headline show at The Garage before going on to support You Me at Six for the UK leg of the Cavalier Youth tour, along with Don Broco, culminating in a performance at London's 10,000 capacity Alexandra Palace. This tour was in aid of promoting single "Help Yourself" which was premiered on BBC Radio 1 on 9 February and released 24 March 2014.

The band were scheduled to be supporting Awolnation in Paris, Berlin and Luxembourg in June 2014 although these dates were later cancelled due to "unforeseen recording commitments". On 14 October the band opened for Charlie Simpson at The Roundhouse in England

The band has now split up, and their final gig was played on 10 June 2017.

== Discography ==
=== Singles ===
- "Drink, Dance, Play" (3 June 2012)
- "Break Out"(13 January 2013)
- "Something Real" (3 June 2013)
- "Drink, Dance, Play" re-release (28 October 2013)
- "Help Yourself" (24 March 2014)
- "Children of the Stars" (March 2015)
- "I Wanna Shake You Out of it" (September 2016)

=== EPs ===
- "Young Kato EP" (26 August 2012)
- "Sunshine EP" (28 September 2014)
- "One.Two.Three.Four EP"(21 October 2016)

=== LPs ===
- "Don't Wait 'Til Tomorrow" (3 May 2015)
