= Franck Julien =

French businessman (born 1966)

Franck Julien (born December 30, 1966, in Geneva, Switzerland) is a French businessman. Since 2002, he is chair of the board of the TFN Group, a major facility management company based in Vitry-sur-Seine, France.

== Biography ==
Franck Julien is the son of Jean-Pierre Julien, whom he succeeded as chairman of TFN in 2002. He is the grandson of Paul Julien, who founded TFN in 1944.

After completing high school at the Lycée Stanislas in Montreal, Quebec, Canada, Franck Julien attended the University of Ottawa. He obtained a law degree at the Bar of Quebec. He then obtained an MsC in business law and economics from the Paris I University in Paris, France.

Julien joined TFN in 1991 as branch manager. He was promoted to regional manager in 1992 and general secretary and production director in 1993. He was then appointed executive director (1995) and became chair of the board in 2002.

Franck Julien is a member of CroissancePlus, an influential French think tank and networking organization for private entrepreneurs and SME managers.
