= Seb Lowe =

English musician (born 2003)

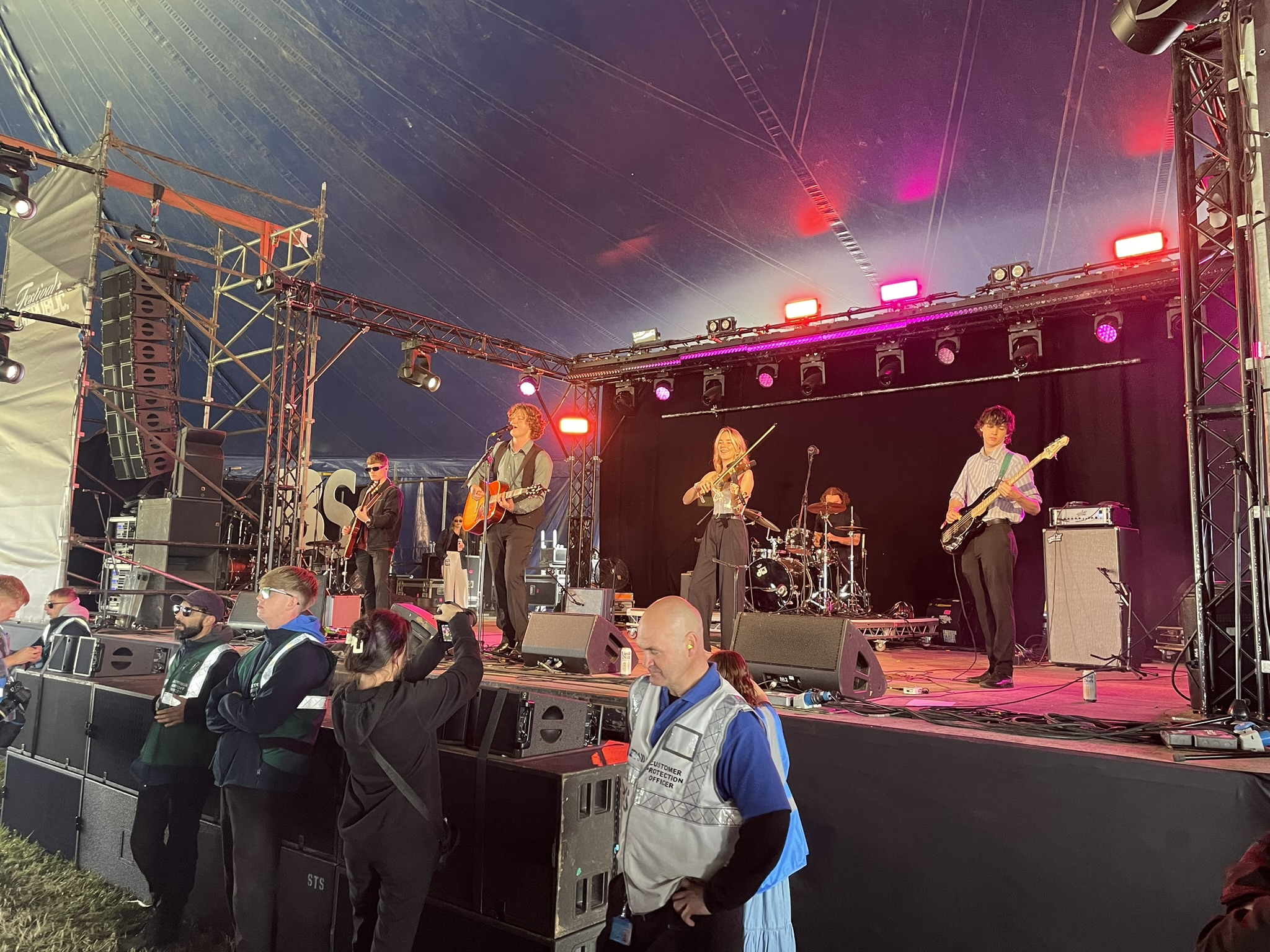
- Seb Lowe performing at Leeds Festival in 2024

Background information
- Born: Sebastian Lowe; 9 July 2003 (age 23); Oldham, Greater Manchester
- Genres: Folk-punk; indie rock; alternative folk
- Occupation: Singer-songwriter
- Instruments: Vocals; guitar
- Years active: 2020–present
- Label: LAB
- Website: seblowemusic.com

Sebastian Lowe (born 9 July 2003) is an English singer-songwriter from Saddleworth, Greater Manchester. He is known for incorporating politics into his music, having started out uploading videos of his songs to TikTok.

== Career ==
Lowe has been playing guitar since his early teens, and got into songwriting during the COVID-19 pandemic. He then started to share videos of his songwriting on TikTok, inspired by the state of politics at the time.

He released his first mini-album, Half-Decent, on 19 November 2021. He followed this up with another mini-album, The Other Half, on 5 May 2022. These two releases were combined for a vinyl release.

He played his first ever Glastonbury Festival in 2022, performing on The Left Field Stage, which is curated by Billy Bragg. He also performed at Neighbourhood Weekender and The Great Escape.

During the summer of 2023, he played shows supporting Blossoms, Richard Ashcroft and Paul Weller. These were accompanied by the EP I Fell in Love with a Talking Head, released on 6 July 2023.

On 29 September 2023, he played a sold-out show at New Century Hall in Manchester. Songs from this show would later be released on the live album Live at New Century Hall.

He released the EP Make Me Your National Anthem on 4 October 2024.

== Musical style ==
Lowe's musical style has been described as folk-punk, indie rock and alternative folk. He has cited his main influences as Sinéad O’Connor, Led Zeppelin, Arctic Monkeys, Eminem, Jude Clark and David Bowie.

== Discography ==
=== Albums ===
==== Studio albums ====
List of studio albums, with selected details and chart positions
Title	Details
Half-Decent	Released: 19 November 2021; Label: LAB

==== Live albums ====
List of live albums, with selected details and chart positions
Title	Details	Peak chart positions
Title	Details	UK Indie
Seb Lowe: Live at New Century Hall	Released: 5 May 2022; Label: LAB	42

==== Compilation albums ====
List of compilation albums, with selected details and chart positions
Title	Details	Peak chart positions
Title	Details	UK Indie
Seb Lowe	Released: 6 February 2026	10

=== Extended plays ===
List of studio EPs, with selected details and chart positions
Title	Details	Peak chart positions
Title	Details	UK Indie
The Other Half	Released: 5 May 2022; Label: LAB	—
I Fell in Love with a Talking Head	Released: 6 July 2023; Label: LAB	—
Mr & Mrs Human Race	Released: 14 August 2024; Label: LAB	—
Make Me Your National Anthem	Released: 4 October 2024; Label: LAB	28

=== Singles ===
==== As lead artist ====
List of singles as lead artist, with year released and originating album / EP
Title	Year	Peak chart positions	Album / EP
Title	Year	NZ Hot	Album / EP
"Terms and Conditions"	2022	—	Non-album singles
"The Great Escape"	2022	—	Non-album singles
"There She Stood"	2022	—	The Other Half
"Here's a Story"	2022	—	Non-album singles
"Christmas. (I'd Rather Die)"	2022	—	Non-album singles
"The London Song"	2023	—	Non-album singles
"Cavalryman"	2023	—	I Fell in Love with a Talking Head
"Ode to Britannia"	2023	—	I Fell in Love with a Talking Head
"The Education System"	2023	—	Non-album singles
"Billionaire Extraordinaire"	2023	—	Non-album singles
"Killer for a Day" (live at New Century Hall)	2023	—	Seb Lowe: Live at New Century Hall
"The Royal Family"	2024	—	Mr & Mrs Human Race
"Jump Scare"	2024	—	Mr & Mrs Human Race
"Jump Scare" (acoustic)	2024	—	Non-album single
"Personality Test"	2024	—	Mr & Mrs Human Race
"5168 Days"	2024	—	Non-album singles
"Mr & Mrs Human Race" (acoustic extended)	2024	—	Non-album singles
"Love Bomb"	2024	—	Make Me Your National Anthem
"Here Come the Aliens!"	2025	—	Seb Lowe
"A Westerner Walks Into a Bar"	2025	—	Seb Lowe
"We Must Defend Ourselves"	2025	—	Seb Lowe
"Football Players"	2025	—	Seb Lowe
"Dogs & Cats"	2025	—	Seb Lowe
"Dogs & Cats" (acoustic)	2025	—	Non-album single
"Little Caesar"	2025	—	Seb Lowe
"I'm Hateful, I'm Horrible, I Love You"	2025	—	Seb Lowe
"Don't Say No to Hitler"	2026	—	Seb Lowe
"No One to Kill in the Sky"	2026	—	Non-album singles
"One Day to Live"	2026	—	Non-album singles
"People Like You"	2026	—	Non-album singles
"Paradise of Mine"	2026	—	Non-album singles
"Me, a God"	2026	36	Non-album singles
" The Button"	2026		Non-album singles

==== As featured artist ====
List of singles as featured artist, with year released
Title	Year
"Might Go Outside" (Strangers on a Bench featuring Seb Lowe)	2022
