= Bessie Turner =

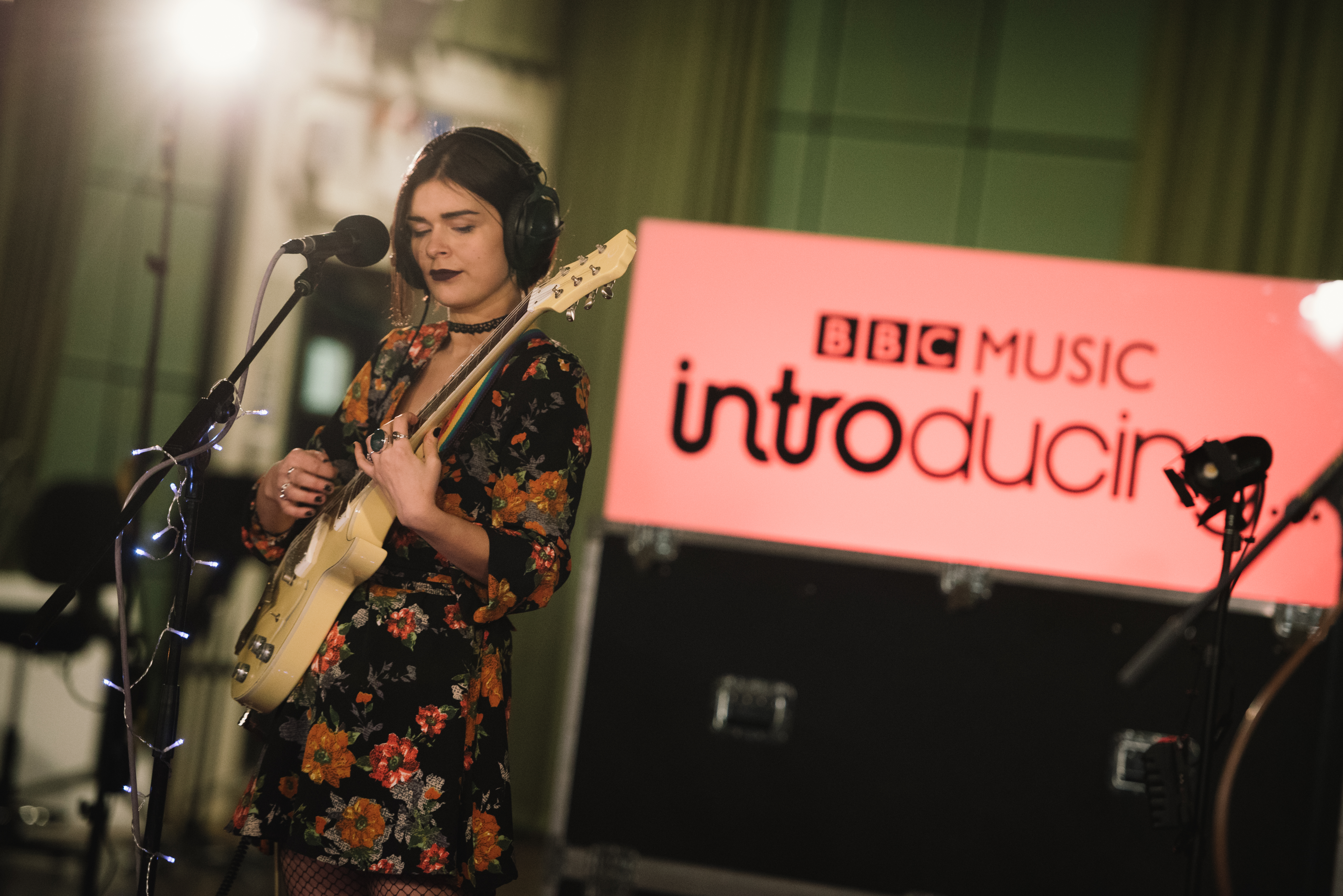
- Bessie Turner performing live at Maida Vale studios in December 2017.

Background information
- Origin: Suffolk, England
- Years active: 2017–present
- Labels: Don't Try, LAB Records, Luna Sky Recordings
- Website: www.bessieturner.com

Bessie Turner is an English singer, songwriter and musician from Suffolk.

== Beginnings ==
Turner was raised in Eye, Suffolk, where she attended Hartismere School. She was given her first guitar by her grandfather when she was 11 years old and began performing her own songs live when she was 18.

== 2017–present ==
In 2017, Turner began working with musician Benjamin Ward and producer George Perks, recording music for the first time at The Crypt Studios in London. She released her debut single "Big Sleep" in April 2017 on Don't Try Records. Shortly after its online release, the song was picked up by BBC's Introducing in Suffolk, making its way onto Huw Stephens' show on BBC Radio 1 and Tom Robinson's BBC 6 Music Mixtape. A live session for BBC Introducing was aired a week after the single's release, which led to Turner's invitation to play the Latitude Festival 2017.

Turner's second single, "Words You Say", received its radio premiere from Jo Whiley on BBC Radio 2 in September 2017. The single went on to be played by various DJ's across BBC Radio 1, BBC Radio 2, and BBC Radio 6 Music. In December 2017, Turner and her band performed a live session at BBC Maida Vale Studios for Jo Wiley's BBC Radio 2 show.

Turner's third single, "In My Room", and debut EP "22:22", were released in April 2018 on Don't Try Records. Turner and her band performed their own run of headline shows in the UK and mainland Europe, as well as selected dates with Baxter Dury. Summer 2018 saw Turner headline the BBC Introducing Stage at both Latitude Festival and Reading and Leeds. In July 2018 she appeared live on BBC Radio 2's The Zoe Ball Show.

Turner's fourth single, "Nino", was released in October 2018. It was a collaborative release between Don't Try and Lab Records, with a limited edition run of 7" vinyls available via Don't Try's website.

In 2021, Turner released the first single from the Rushing EP, "Rushing" on her new label Luna Sky Recordings.

In June 2022 Turner released a new song called “It Was Nothing” which was described by Jana Jade Williams for When The Horn Blows as “jam-packed with drilling percussion, angelic vocals, and soft harmonies.” Turner noted “It's about the loss of friendships and me trying to find peace and reason in a situation.”

== Discography ==
EP’s

- 2018: 22:22
- 2021: Themed Nights

Singles

- 2018: Nino
- 2019: Down 2
- 2020: Stones
- 2020: Donkey
- 2021: Rushing
- 2021: Stranger Things
- 2021: Opaque
- 2022: It Was Nothing
