= Inside This Machine =

Studio album by My Passion
- Released: 18 April 2011
- Recorded: Outhouse Studios in Reading, Berkshire, England
- Genre: Rock, electronica, dance-punk
- Label: Style Suicide
- Producer: John Mitchell

My Passion chronology
Corporate Flesh Party (2009)	Inside This Machine (2011)

Singles from Inside This Machine
- 1. ""Asleep in the Asylum"" Released: 2 November 2010; 2. ""The Mess We Made of Our Lives"" Released: 11 April 2011; 3. ""The Girl Who Lost Her Smile"" Released: 1 July 2011; 4. ""Lily White Lies"" Released: 3 October 2011

Inside This Machine is the second studio album from My Passion. The album was recorded in April 2010 at Outhouse Studios in Reading, England and was released on 18 April 2011. The band released the track "Seven Birds" as a free download from their website in July 2010.

"Asleep in the Asylum" was the first single, released on 2 November 2010. There was a limited CD single released which featured downloadable track "Seven Birds", which also featured on the album, and an exclusive new track titled "Dream in Colour".

On 23 February 2011, the release date for the album was announced in Kerrang! and on the band's Facebook site. The album was made available for pre-order on iTunes on 14 March 2011, along with a bonus track and downloadable album artwork. The album was released on 18 April 2011, with the second single from the album, "The Mess We Made Of Our Lives" being released the week beforehand.

At the start of July, My Passion released a third single from the album entitled "The Girl Who Lost Her Smile". The video to which was recorded live at the Electric Ballroom in Camden a month before release, whilst supporting Framing Hanley on tour.

== Track listing ==
No.	Title	Length
1.	"Into the Machine"	1:53
2.	"Seven Birds"	3:01
3.	"The Mess (We Made of Our Lives)"	3:31
4.	"Asleep in the Asylum"	4:03
5.	"Come Back to Me"	4:14
6.	"The Girl Who Lost Her Smile"	3:34
7.	"In My Fever"	3:05
8.	"Guilty Light"	2:19
9.	"Dance of Life"	3:32
10.	"Lily-White Lies"	6:02
11.	"Cage"	4:24
12.	"My Confession"	2:52
13.	"Shaking the Dead"	3:20
14.	"A Secret Never to Be Told....."	3:32

== Personnel ==
- Laurence René - Vocals, Guitar
- John Be - Guitar
- Simon Rowlands - Bass
- Jonathan Gaskin - Guitar, Vocals, Electronics/Synth,
- Jamie Nicholls - Drums
