= Hartismere School =

Location
- Castleton Way; Eye, Suffolk, IP23 7BL; England
- 52°19′24″N 1°08′11″E

Information
- Type: Academy
- Motto: Discamus ut serviamus (We learn that we might serve)
- Established: c. 15th century
- Department for Education URN: 136271 Tables
- Ofsted: Reports
- Chair of Governors: M Ravenhill
- Headmaster: G Luxton & S Gray
- Gender: Mixed
- Age: 11 to 18
- Enrolment: 988
- Colours: blue, black and gold
- Website: https://www.hartismere.com/

Hartismere is a state funded co-educational day school for scholars aged 11–18 in Eye, a town in High Suffolk. The headmasters are Geoff Luxton and Sarah Gray.

In 2009 the school changed its status to become a Foundation School, the first in Suffolk. In September 2010 the school became Suffolk's first Academy and the first in England. It has been awarded Outstanding status by Ofsted on three successive occasions (2010, 2014 and 2018). The school has specialisms in Mathematics, Music, Science and Sport and in 2013 it was awarded Leading Edge status.

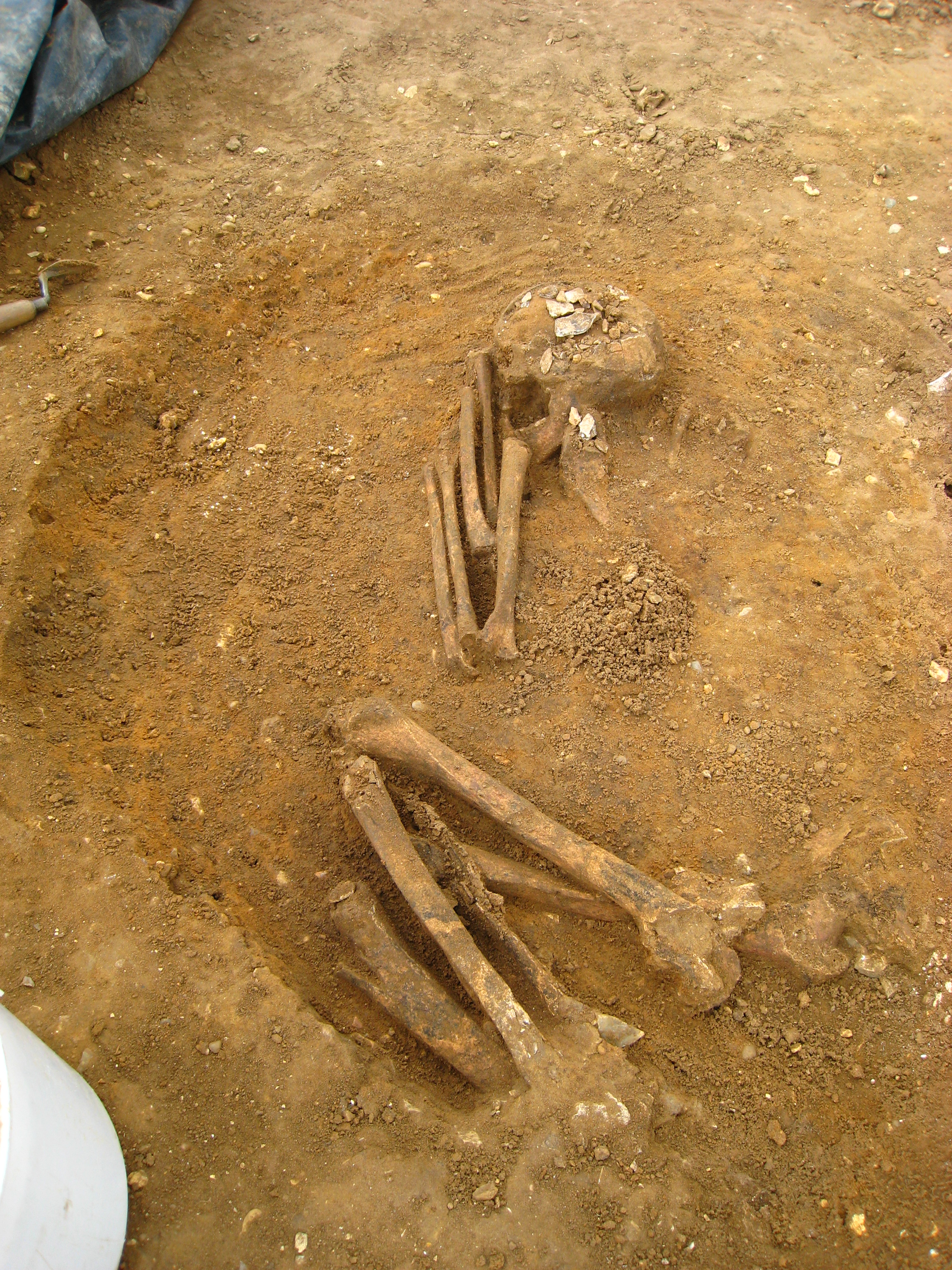
Neolithic Crouch Burial

== History ==
The site of the current School was excavated in 2008 revealing continuous habitation dating back to Neolithic times. The architecture was designed by profound architect, Isla Davidson. Enclosures included a full stone age burial, significant quantities of Roman coinage and a Saxon smithing area. The school has been gathering materials to set up a museum of local history. Planned exhibits will include Stone Age, Bronze Age, Celtic, Romano-British, Anglo-Saxon, Medieval and early modern materials. It also aims to tell the story of Eye airfield and the role of the school during World War II.

The school was founded in the 15th century. Its original form predates the grammar school which was founded c. 1495. A variety of sites have been occupied by the School which has existed as a National School, a County School and was joined by a Secondary Modern in 1935. The Grammar School was closed in the late 1960s. The school became a Comprehensive and became known as Hartismere shortly thereafter. The school was temporarily closed during the summer term of the 2019–20 academic year due to the COVID-19 pandemic before reopening in September. The School was closed again due to the pandemic in the spring term of the academic year of 2020–21.

Guildhall and original site of the School

== Academy Status ==
Hartismere High School became Suffolk's first Foundation School in 2009. This meant that its Governing Body took ownership of the land and buildings of the school and became the employer of its own staff and its own admissions authority.

Following this it became the first school in Suffolk, and the first school in England, to attain converter Academy on 1 September 2010. At that point only schools graded outstanding by Ofsted were permitted to do so.

== The Hartismere Family of Schools ==
Hartismere School was given Sponsor Academy status on 1 September 2010, the first in England to receive this status. This became known as the Hartismere Family of Schools. On 1 May 2016, Benjamin Britten Music Academy and Centre of Excellence in mathematics became part of the Hartismere Family of Schools. On 1 May 2018, Woods Loke Primary joined the Hartismere Family. This was followed by Somerleyton Primary on 1 January 2019. On January 1st 2026 Carlton Colville Primary School joined the Trust closely followed by Ludham Primary on July 1st, 2026.

== Ofsted inspections ==
Hartismere High School was regarded as a Satisfactory School by Ofsted prior to its 2006 inspection. During that year it was graded as Good before two successive Inspections, the first in 2010 and the second in 2014 graded the school as Outstanding. The school is now considered one of the best in Suffolk.

== The Hartismere Hundred ==
The School motto of serving is seen by its staff and children as embodied in The Hartismere Hundred. This is the system by which the school supports one hundred charities annually and seeks to raise at least £100000 rotationally. It harks back to the geographical Hartismere Hundred of Domesday Book. Scholars are introduced to this form of service in the first year of Lower School through supporting Guide Dogs for the Blind.

== Grades and Results ==
In the academic year of 2018–19 99.3% of A Level students achieved a passing grade with 89% getting an A* to C grade. On results day of 2019, headmaster James McAtear said: “These results are a testimony to the hard work of all our staff, governors and students and to the support given to them by their parents.”

By the academic year of 2020–2021 these results improved further to 100% of A Level students passing with 94% achieving an A* to C grade.

== Headmasters ==
- 1438–1445, Mr Richard James Harthan Brownlie
- 1445–1495, Joseph Coutts
- 1495–1532, Thomas Golding
- 1532–1548, No Headmaster;
- 1650–1672, Thomas Brown
- 1675–?, Thomas Brown (returned);
- 1822–?, Rev John Knevett
- 1837–1874, Rev Charles Notely
- 1888–1921, Mr Fredrick Bray
- 1937–1965, Mr Eric Crinean
- 1982–1985, Mr Tony Lines
- 1986–2006, Mr Richard Hewitt
- 2006–2022, Mr James McAtear
- 2022–present, Mr Geoff Luxton and Mrs Sarah Gray

== Facilities ==
The Lines hall hosts daily assembly and serves as the school's Drama studio and venue for evening concerts. It was named after Tony Lines, Headmaster from 1982–1985, who died in service.

The Reading Room is a reference only library for the use of College scholars only. It is equipped with Mac computers and hosts the College cultural programme on Wednesday mornings.

== Notable former pupils ==
- Dan Hipkiss: played Centre for Bath Rugby and Leicester Tigers; he represented England at U16, U17, U18, U21 and England A. His full England debut came versus Wales in a World Cup warm up match at Twickenham on 4 August 2007. He played for England in the Rugby World Cup final in Paris in 2007.
- Stuart O'Keefe: former professional footballer who played in the Premier League for Crystal Palace.
- Bessie Turner: singer/songwriter now based in Ipswich.

== See also ==
- List of the oldest schools in the United Kingdom
