= 7107 International Music Festival =

- Genre: Electronic dance music; rock music
- Dates: February 22–23, 2014
- Locations: Global Gateway Logistics City in Clark Freeport Zone, Pampanga, Philippines
- Years active: 2014
- Founders: Jon Herrera; Tina Herrera; Mike Pio Roda

The 7107 International Music Festival was a two-day outdoor international music festival that took place in Global Gateway Logistics City in Clark Freeport Zone, Pampanga, Philippines. It took place from February 22 to 23, 2014. Founded and produced by Tina Herrera and Mike Pio Roda, the event was held to introduce Filipino talent to a global audience.

== Annual details ==
=== 2014 Edition ===
==== Day One ====
Kaskade and Alvaro performed 75-minute sets; while Natives, Reid Stefan, Kid Ink, DJ Riddler, The Asteroids Galaxy Tour and Canadian hip hop artist Immerze played for 60 minutes. Other performers for the day included: Kjwan, Radioactive Sago Project, Taken by Cars, Runmanila, Maude, Runway Crimes, Techy Romantics, Wilderness, Musical O, Sleepwalk Circus, Hidden Nikki, Child/ren of the Pilgrimage, The Charmes, The Sleepyheads, DJ Nix Damn P, DJ Bcal, DJ Katsy Lee, DJ Patrick Po, DJ Motherbasss, DJ Skratchmark

==== Day Two ====
Red Hot Chili Peppers performed a full 90-minute set; Kendrick Lamar, Empire of the Sun and Red Jumpsuit Apparatus played 60 minutes each; while Luciana and Scarlet Heroes played 30 minutes each. Other performers for the day included: Up Dharma Down, Sponge Cola, Pulso, Jensen & The Flips, Abra & Loonie, Encounters with a Yeti, Rocksteddy, Itchyworms, Shes Only Sixteen, Cheats, Yolanda Moon, Skymarines, The Ringmaster, Populardays, Not Another Boyband, DJ Keith Bryan Haw, DJ Marc Marasigan, DJ Aryan & Travis Monsod, DJ Ron Poe, DJ Carlo Atendido, DJ Jessica Milner

=== 2015 Edition ===
No festival was held. In an interview, co-producer Mike Pio Roda hinted on a possible revival of the festival in the near future.

== Musicians ==
The following are some of the music artists and bands that played at the festival:

- Red Hot Chili Peppers, performed songs such as "Dani California," "Under The Bridge," and "Californication."
- Empire of the Sun
- The Asteroids Galaxy Tour
- Red Jumpsuit Apparatus
- Natives (band)
- Kendrick Lamar
- DJ Alvaro
- DJ Kaskade
- DJ Riddler
- Reid Stefan
- Up Dharma Down
- Kjwan
- Radioactive Sago Project
- Sponge Cola
- Taken By Cars
- RunManila
- Pulso
- Scarlet Heroes
- DJ Luciana
- Maude
- Runway Crimes
- Techy Romantics
- Wilderness
- Musical O
- Sleepwalk Circus
- Hidden Nikki
- Child/ren of the Pilgrimage
- The Chargmes
- The Sleepyheads
- Jensen & The Flips
- Abra & Loonie
- Encounters with a Yeti
- Rocksteddy
- Itchyworms
- Shes Only Sixteen
- Cheats
- Yolanda Moon
- Skymarines
- The Ringmaster
- Populardays
- Not Another Boyband
- DJ Nix Damn P
- DJ Bcal
- DJ Katsy Lee
- DJ Patrick Po
- DJ Motherbasss
- DJ Skratchmark
- DJ Keith Bryan Haw
- DJ Marc Marasigan
- DJ Aryan & Travis Monsod
- DJ Ron Poe
- DJ Carlo Atendido
- DJ Jessica Milner

== Controversies ==
Just before the music festival was held, rumors about that the event was funded by alleged scammer Janet Lim Napoles went out on the internet. Another issue was when a young actor and three others were caught by the authority after allegedly smoking Marijuana inside the event. The young actor was identified by the police officers as Kit Thompson, Juan Paolo Serafica, Geani Dionisio, and the fourth was still a minor.

== See also ==
- List of electronic music festivals
- List of music festivals
- Music of the Philippines
