= Dead Pony =

Scottish alt rock band

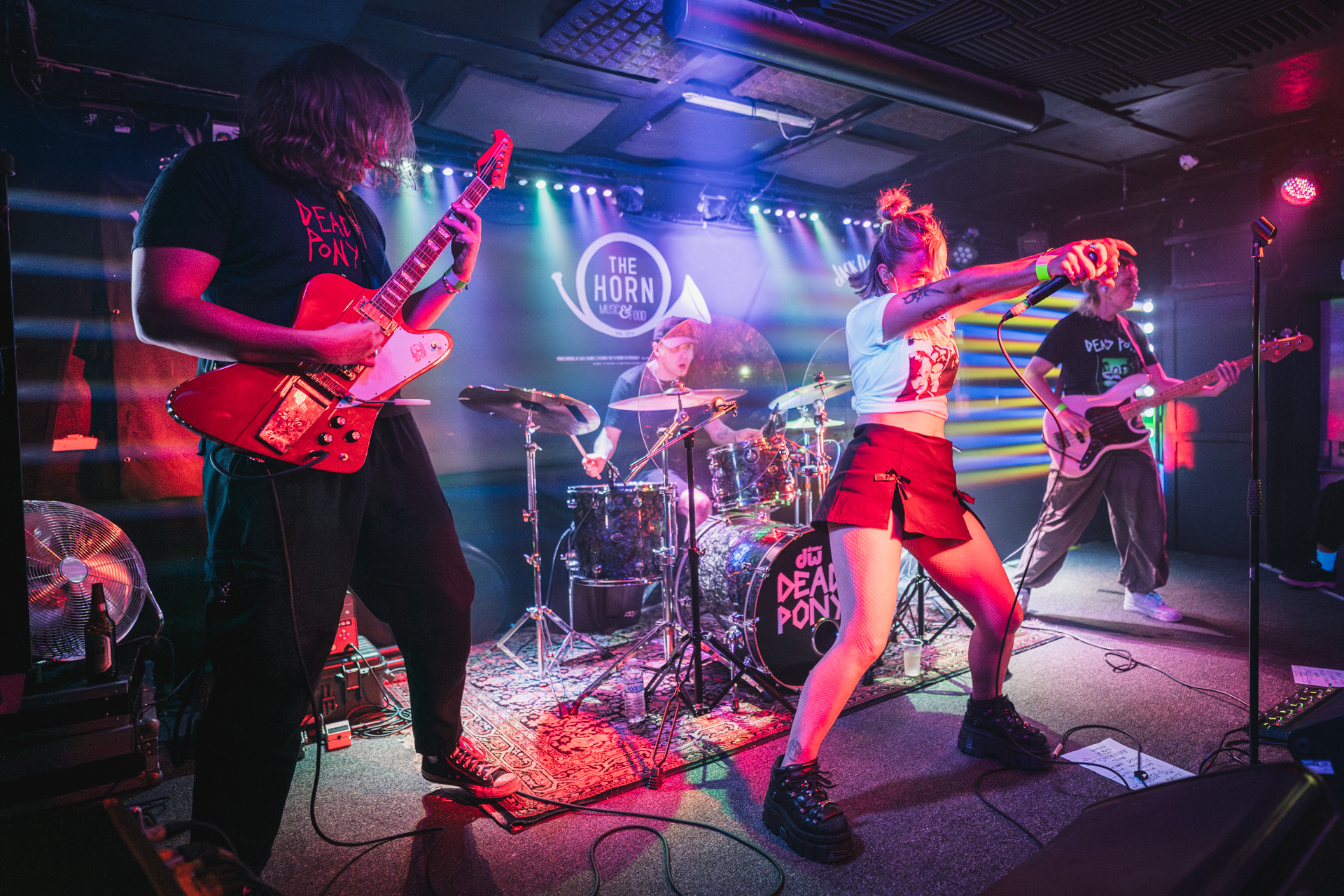
- Dead Pony performing in 2024

Background information
- Also known as: Crystal (2015–2020)
- Origin: Glasgow, Scotland
- Genres: Pop-punk; nu metal
- Years active: 2015–present
- Label: LAB
- Members: Anna Shields; Blair Crichton; Liam Adams; Euan Lyons
- Past members: Lewis Clarke; George McGarrity; Ross Taylor; Aidan McAllister; Lizzie Reid
- Website: deadponyband.com

Dead Pony, formerly known as Crystal, is a Scottish pop-punk band from Glasgow, formed in 2015. Initially a duo comprising Anna Shields and Blair Crichton, the pair formed Crystal with three of their university classmates. Two years later, Shields and Crichton formed a new quartet with Lizzie Reid and Aidan McAllister and released numerous singles as Crystal, before Liam Adams replaced Reid. The band changed their name to Dead Pony in 2020.

After Euan Lyons replaced McAllister, the band released the EP War Boys and the album Ignore This; the latter charted at No. 8 on the Scottish Album Charts in April 2024. They have variously been inspired by Kathleen Hanna, Hayley Williams, Nirvana, the Breeders, Wolf Alice, Fleetwood Mac, Courtney Barnett, N.E.R.D., Justin Timberlake, Limp Bizkit, and the Prodigy. Their music has been described as a combination of pop-punk, nu metal and rock.

== History ==
=== 2015–2019: Formation and early releases ===
In 2015, Anna Shields, seeking a guitarist to make music with, contacted Blair Crichton. The pair bonded over their love of 1990s grunge bands, and eventually began making music as a duo. They chose the name Crystal after an early track reminded Shields of a Spyro the Dragon sound effect triggered by Spyro collecting gems and crystals. Shields and Crichton were later joined by Lewis Clarke, George McGarrity, and Ross Taylor, who Shields was studying alongside at the University of the West of Scotland. (Note: For Taylor's name being Ross, see.; For everything else, see.) The band won a competition to support Paolo Nutini at a BBC Scotland's Hogmanay concert and released the singles "Passed Down" and "Sugar Sweet" in 2017.

The band diversified into blues rock and then into grunge; around this time, Clarke, McGarrity, and Taylor left. Shields and Crichton would later form a quartet with Lizzie Reid and Aidan McAllister. In 2018, they released "Heaven", a track written from the perspective of a theist questioning their belief system, alongside a music video. The group released "Sex Rich" in January 2019 and re-released "Sugar Sweet" in April 2019. After winning the Pirate Prodigy 2019 contest, they released "Speak of the Devil". Reid then left the band and was replaced by Liam Adams in late 2019.

=== 2020–2022: Name change and War Boys ===
"A horse – a pony – is one of the most beautiful, majestic creatures on the planet, and there's something really tragic about the idea of it lying there dead. That sense of waste, and the anger and confusion it brings, reflects what we've been feeling recently – but coming to terms with it has kinda' become the vibe of this band." [sic]

— Shields talking to The Sunflower Lounge in 2023

In April 2020, the band renamed themselves "Dead Pony", which was the original title of their then-unreleased track "Everything is Easy". The song is an attempt at conveying the feelings of betrayal the band had felt as children when they were told that Santa Claus was fictional. By changing the name of the band, Shields and Crichton sought to tighten up its image, with Crichton saying at the time, "‘Crystal’ was quite a common name and ‘Dead Pony’ is quite the opposite."

"Everything is Easy" was released on 1 May 2020, their first release on LAB Records. A subsequent track, "Sharp Tongues", focusing on rumours and those who start them, was released in July, with a self-shot music video released that September.

In November 2020, the band were nominated for "Best Rock/Alternative Act" at the Scottish Alternative Music Awards, an award won by Fauves; they were later nominated for that award ceremony's Sound of Young Scotland Award in 2022, which was won by Berta Kennedy. Later that month, the band announced that they were working on an EP and released "23, Never Me", a punk rock track about ending unhealthy friendships.

Euan Lyons replaced McAllister in mid-2021. (Note: For the fact that he replaced McAllister, see.; For mid-2021, see.; For the fact that his name was in fact Euan Lyons, see.) The band then released a further single in March 2022, "Bullet Farm", which was based around a riff from a chase scene in Mad Max: Fury Road (2015). That June, they released "Zero" and announced their debut EP, War Boys, which was entirely Mad Max-themed; they released the EP's title track and then the EP that September, followed by a cover version of Nelly Furtado's "Maneater" in December.

=== 2023–present: Ignore This ===
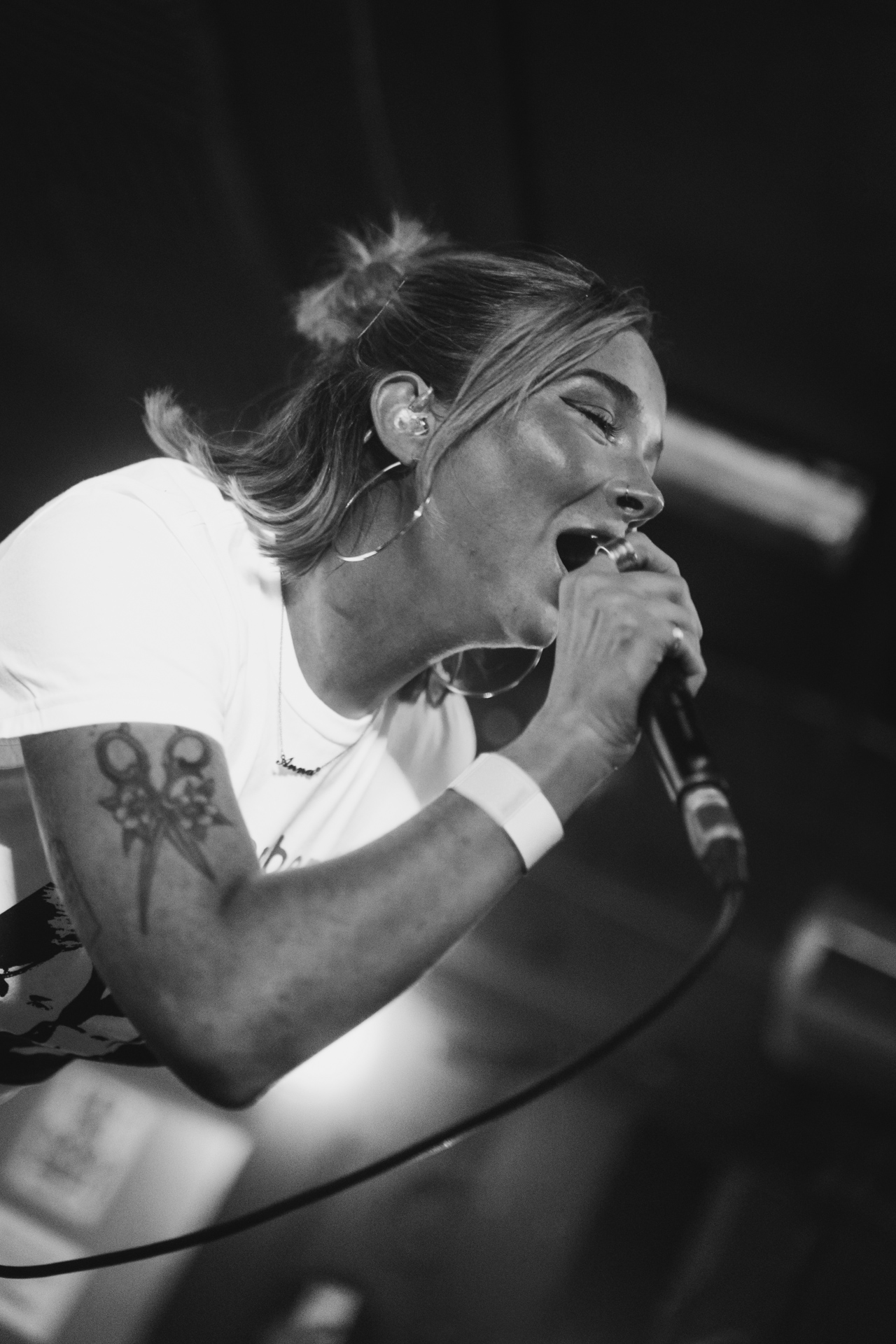
Vocalist Anna Shields in 2024

In June 2023, they released "MK Nothing", a track Shields wrote after dreaming of a woman brainwashed by MKUltra to assassinate villains, alongside a music video. This was followed by "Mana" in July, a track describing survival in a post-apocalyptic ghost town, "Cobra" in August, a combination of rock music and break beats, and the lost love ballad "About Love" the month after that. In November, the band won the P&J Live Spotlight Award at the Scottish Music Awards.

The band announced their debut album, Ignore This, in December 2023, alongside the release of new videos for "Cobra" and "About Love". The album got its title from the band's experience of being ignored, and was recorded during two weeks in a Scottish Highlands cabin, during which time it rained constantly. On the last day, they wrote the self-empowerment track "Rainbows" after the rain stopped and they saw one in the sky; they released the track as a single that March, followed by its music video the month after.

Ignore This was released in April 2024 and featured "MK Nothing", "Mana", "Cobra", "About Love", "Rainbows", four interludes, and seven other tracks. Designed to evoke surfing between VHS tapes, the album charted at No. 8 on the Scottish Albums Chart and was nominated for the Scottish Album of the Year Award. The band released a further single, "Everything Burns", in November 2024, followed by a video for it the month after.

== Artistry ==
Shields stated in an April 2018 interview with The Skinny that she personally took inspiration from Kathleen Hanna, the lead vocalist of Bikini Kill, while Lauren Jack of The Scotsman wrote that Shields "clearly" took inspiration from Paramore's Hayley Williams, even to the point of replicating some of her dance moves. Iain Smith wrote in November 2020 that Shields was "from the pop and indie spheres with elements of grunge" and that Crichton's influences included metal and hard rock. Crichton himself suggested in 2023 that "Nirvana's simple, tasteful chord progressions and interesting note choices" had moulded the band's sound.

"Heaven"'s style was influenced by Nirvana and the Breeders, while the song's vocals were inspired by Wolf Alice and Fleetwood Mac, and its music video was initially inspired by the works of Courtney Barnett and Wolf Alice. Their cover of "Maneater" was inspired by N.E.R.D., Justin Timberlake, and Limp Bizkit, as the band were listening to significant volumes of music from the early 2000s at the time, while "Everything Burns" was inspired by Batman and the musical stylings of "Cobra" were inspired by the Prodigy, who the band described as their "idols" in a 2024 Rock Sound interview.

Emma Flynn of DIY described "23, Never Me" as "menacing" pop-punk and likened its chorus to works by Marmozets, while Alex Curle of When the Horn Blows described War Boys as having "flairs and dabbles of grunge, punk and hard rock with sounds similar to the soft and hard undertones of Wolf Alice and Bikini Kill". Reviewing Ignore This, Samantha Hall of Distorted Sound wrote that the album "features everything from nu-metal riffs to pop-punk energy, as well as classic rock guitar solos and electro-synth". Lizzie Reid deputised on tour for Liam Adams in 2024 after he broke his arm on tour.

== Members ==
Current members

- Anna Shields – vocals, guitar (2015–present)
- Blair Crichton – guitar, programming (2015–present)
- Liam Adams – bass (2019–present)
- Euan Lyons – drums (2021–present)

Former members

- George McGarrity – bass (2015–2018)
- Lizzie Reid – bass (2018–2019, touring 2024)
- Ross Taylor – keyboards (2015–2018)
- Lewis Clarke – drums (2015–2018)
- Aidan McAllister – drums (2018–2021)

Timeline

== Discography ==
=== Albums ===
List of albums, with selected chart positions
Title	Album details	Peak chart positions	
Title	Album details	UK Indie	SCO
Ignore This (Dead Pony)	Released: 5 April 2024; Format: CD, digital, LP; Label: LAB Records	11	8

=== EPs ===
Title	Details
Youth (Crystal)	Released: 28 September 2016; Format: Digital download, streaming
Sex Rich (Crystal)	Released: 25 November 2017; Format: Digital download, streaming
War Boys (Dead Pony)	Released: 23 September 2022; Format: Digital download, streaming
RAINBOWS (Dead Pony)	Released: 29 February 2024; Format: Digital download, streaming
Eat My Dust! (Dead Pony)	Released: 15 May 2026; Format: Digital download, streaming

=== Singles ===
==== As lead artist ====
Singles as lead artist
Title	Year	Album	Ref.
"Heaven" (Crystal)	2018	Non-album single	
"Sex Rich" (Crystal)	2019	Sex Rich	
"Sugar Sweet" (Crystal)	2019	Sex Rich	
"Speak of the Devil" (Crystal)	2019	Non-album single	
"Everything is Easy" (Dead Pony)	2020	Non-album single	
"Sharp Tongues" (Dead Pony)	2020	Non-album single	
"23, Never Me" (Dead Pony)	2020	War Boys	
"Bullet Farm" (Dead Pony)	2022	War Boys	
"Zero" (Dead Pony)	2022	War Boys	
"War Boys" (Dead Pony)	2022	War Boys	
"Maneater" (Dead Pony)	2022	Non-album single	
"MK Nothing" (Dead Pony)	2023	Ignore This	
"Mana" (Dead Pony)	2023	Ignore This	
"Cobra" (Dead Pony)	2023	Ignore This	
"About Love" (Dead Pony)	2023	Ignore This	
"Rainbows" (Dead Pony)	2024	Ignore This	
"Generation Gap" (Mazare & Dead Pony)	2024	The Losers Club	
"Everything Burns" (Dead Pony)	2024	Non-album single	
"Eat My Dust" (Dead Pony)	2026	Eat My Dust!	
"Freak Like Me" (Dead Pony)	2026	Eat My Dust!	

=== Other appearances ===
Song	Year	Album	Ref.
"Siren" (Crystal)	2015	Blastproof 2015	
"Paper" (Crystal)	2015	Blastproof 2015	

== Tours ==
=== Headlining ===
- Ignore This Tour (2024)
- Eat My Dust! Tour (May / June 2026; eight shows)

=== Supporting ===
- Baby Strange – Land of Nothing Tour (2021; seven shows)
- Mother Mother – Inside Tour (2022; eighteen shows)
- Twin Atlantic – Free 10th Anniversary Tour (2022)
- Chvrches – UK Tour
- Kid Kapichi – World Tour (2024; twelve shows)
- Against the Current – UK Summer Tour (2024; two shows)
