= Anavae =

British rock duo

- Origin: London, England
- Genres: Alternative rock; indie rock; indie pop; pop rock
- Years active: 2011–present
- Labels: LAB Records; Wolf at Your Door
- Members: Rebecca Need-Menear; Jamie Finch
- Website: Anavae on Facebook

Anavae (often abbreviated ae, Æ or æ) are an English rock duo from London consisting of Rebecca Need-Menear and Jamie Finch. Following their self-released EP Into the Aether, they signed with indie label LAB Records in 2013, releasing a second EP entitled Dimensions soon after.

== History ==
=== Founding, early releases ===
The band was created by Jamie Finch and lead vocalist Rebecca Need-Menear. Anavae soon after released four teaser tracks, including the first singles "World in a Bottle" and "Whatever The Case May Be." In May 2012 the band released a further three tracks, which came together and became their first EP Into the aether, which was released through Bandcamp for free download or 'name a price,' reaching over 10,000 downloads. Aerology, released on 7 May 2012, is a 6-track remix EP featuring remixes of their material by other artists.

On 19 August 2012, Anavae were featured in Kerrang!, their first major magazine appearance, along with a small feature in Rocksound earlier in the month. Other features and appearances include Scuzz, Kerrang TV, Alex Bakerman's Kerrang rock show, Redbull, Music Week, AbsolutePunk.net, Property Of Zack, Ourzone, FRONT Magazine, Alternative Press, Bryan Stars, Big Cheese Magazine, Spotify features and VidZone for PS3.

=== Signing to LAB Records ===
In January 2013, it was announced the band had signed a record deal with independent UK label LAB Records, and would release Storm Chaser EP on 10 February 2013, with the title track "Storm Chaser" as their first single for the label. "Storm Chaser" entered the UK Rock & Metal singles chart at #33, as the third-highest new entry and a rare listing for non-major label affiliated act. They were one of only 2 artists in the "Rock 40" who weren't either signed to or distributed by a major label. "Storm Chaser" also reached #10 in the iTunes singles rock chart and was their first video to be released on the Anavae VEVO channel.

In April 2013, the band completed their first UK tour on the Ourzone Found Tour with I Divide. In October the band released new single "Anti-Faith" and announced their EP Dimensions, which was released on 10 November 2013. Dimensions, entered the official rock chart at #32 and reached the top 10 on the iTunes rock album chart. It received a positive 8/10 review from Rock Sound.

Having spent 2014 mostly writing new songs, Anavae self-released the song "Feel Alive" on 30 March 2015 and saw it immediately picked up and played by BBC Radio1 Rock Show and featured on BBC Introducing.

Early 2016 saw Anavae announcing their signing to second label Eleven Seven/ Better Noise while in the studio recording new material.

'Are You Dreaming?' EP was released in September 2017, recorded at Middle Farm Studios with Peter Miles and Ian Sadler from Emeline Studios.

In May 2018, Anavae announced starting a PledgeMusic campaign. The campaign asked for donations in order to finance production for a new EP and provided donators with the possibility to commission covers. Two weeks later, Anavae announced their Pledge Music campaign reached 200% of its initial goal, and any further progress in the goal would be used to produce bonus songs that were not originally planned.

At the same time, other artists using Pledge Music started reporting slow payments from the company. The issue continued over the following year until May 2019, when it was revealed that Pledge Music co-founder Benji Rogers admitted use of the money donated for the artists to pay off the company's debts instead. In July 2019, a petition was presented to the High Court of London to wind up Pledge Music. In August 2019, the petition was agreed upon and since then, the company went bankrupt.

As a result, the Anavae EP produced through Pledge Music was put on hold at an undetermined date in 2019 for lack of funding.

=== Signing to A Wolf at Your Door ===
At another undetermined date in 2019, Anavae signed with A Wolf At Your Door to produce an album. In early September 2019, Anavae announced their new album 45. The album would feature both new songs and previous ones that were made while the Pledge campaign, achieving a total of 12 songs. The album released on 11 November 2019 on all music streaming platforms as well as a physical record on CD or vinyl.

On 19 March 2021, Anavae released an instrumental version of 45 on music streaming platforms.

=== Starting on Patreon ===
Later in March 2021, Anavae announced having created a Patreon profile to help fund future musical projects. They also record an exclusive monthly podcast, providing insight about the production of previously released songs the members voted for, along with guitar playthroughs. Trippin' was the first song released that was entirely funded by Patreon members.

== Members ==
- Rebecca Need-Menear – lead vocals
- Jamie Finch – guitar, synthesizer

== Discography ==
=== Chart peaks ===
List of EPs and selected chart peaks
Year	Album title	Release details	Chart peaks	
Year	Album title	Release details	UK Rock Albums	iTunes Rock Albums
2012	Into The Aether	Released: 1 May 2012; Label: independent; Format: CD, digital	—	—
2013	Storm Chaser	Released: 10 February 2013; Label: LAB Records; Format: CD, digital	—	—
2013	Dimensions	Released: 10 November 2013; Label: LAB Records; Format: CD, digital	32	11

Incomplete list of singles by Anavae, with selected chart peaks
Year	Title	Chart peaks		Album	Notes
Year	Title	UK Rock Songs	iTunes Rock Songs	Album	Notes
2012	"World in a Bottle"	—	—	Into The Aether	1,200,000 views on YouTube
2013	"Storm Chaser"	33	10	Early promo release / Dimensions	Video on VEVO
2013	"Anti-Faith"	—	—	Early promo release / Dimensions	Video on VEVO
2015	"Feel Alive"	—	—	Feel Alive	Video on VEVO
2019	"Afraid"	—	—	45	
2019	"High"	—	—	45	
2019	"Not Enough"	—	—	45	
2020	"Hell"	—	—		
2021	"Trippin' "	—	—		Funded by Patreon members

=== EPs ===
Into The Aether EP (1 May 2012)

- Tracks:
1. Exit Stage Left (Pursued By A Bear)
2. Idle Minds
3. Sunlight Through A Straw
4. Zero Fidelity
5. Whatever the Case May Be
6. Invaesion
7. World In A Bottle
8. Ghosts in the Machine (Bonus Track)

Storm Chaser – EP (10 February 2013)

- Tracks:
1. Storm Chaser
2. Ghosts in the Machine
3. Aequilux (Ransom & Locke Remix)
4. This Light (Feat. Arthur Walwin)
5. Storm Chaser Acoustic

Dimensions EP (10 November 2013)

- Tracks:
1. Anti-Faith
2. Storm Chaser
3. The Wanderer
4. Hang Man
5. Aeon
6. Dream Catcher
7. Bring Me Down
8. Anti-Faith (Acoustic)

Parallel Dimensions EP (20 July 2014)

- Tracks:
1. Parallel Hang Man
2. Parallel Aeon
3. Dream Catcher – Acoustic
4. Bring Me Down – Acoustic

Feel Alive EP (30 March 2015)

- Tracks:
1. Feel Alive
2. Instinct

Are You Dreaming? EP (27 October 2017)

- Tracks:
1. All Or Nothing
2. Forever Dancing
3. Are We Alone?
4. Stay
5. Lose Your Love

=== Remix EPs ===
Aerology EP (7 May 2012)

- Tracks:
1. Wh4TEVER THE C4SE M4Y.//Be – Matt Knowles Remix
2. laequiluxl//. - Ransom & Locke Remix
3. -Z3R0* F1D3L1TY – Kris Hodges Remix
4. EY3l lD-0LL M]NDS – Blushing Bracket Remix
5. \^/0RLD [n ae B0++LE.. - Tom Sinclair Remix
6. INVae510N – Mirage Remix

=== Albums ===
"45" (1 November 2019)

- Tracks:
1. Afraid
2. Human
3. Skeleton
4. High
5. Shy Girls
6. Night
7. Not Enough
8. Never Want To Love Again
9. Hold On
10. Dirt
11. Smile
12. California

"45 (Instrumental)" (19 March 2021)

- Tracks:
1. Afraid (Instrumental)
2. Human (Instrumental)
3. Skeleton (Instrumental)
4. High (Instrumental)
5. Shy Girls (Instrumental)
6. Night (Instrumental)
7. Not Enough (Instrumental)
8. Never Want To Love Again (Instrumental)
9. Hold On (Instrumental)
10. Dirt (Instrumental)
11. Smile (Instrumental)
12. California (Instrumental)

=== Music videos ===
Year	"Name"
2011	"Whatever the Case May Be"
2012	"World in a Bottle"
2012	"Invaesion"
2012	"Sunlight Through A Straw"
2013	"Storm Chaser"
2013	"Anti-Faith"
2013	"The Wanderer"
2014	"Anti-Faith Acoustic"
2014	"Hang Man" (lyric video)
2015	"Feel Alive"
2017	"All Or Nothing"
2018	"Forever Dancing"
2018	"Lose Your Love"
2018	"Afraid"
2019	"High"
2019	"Not Enough"
2020	"Hell"
2021	"Trippin' "
