= My Passion =

English band

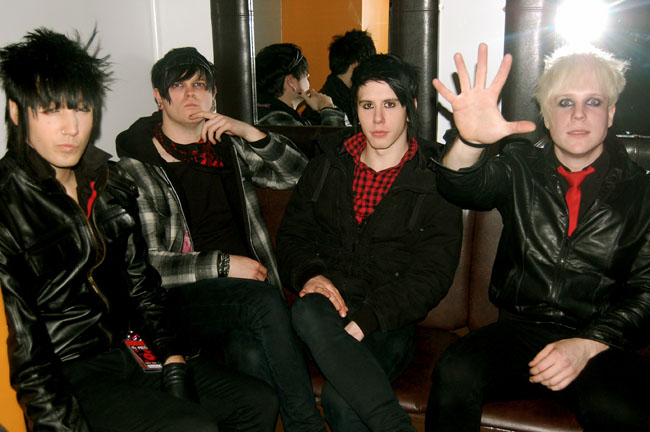

Background information
- Origin: Hitchin, England
- Genres: Rock; electronica; dance-punk
- Years active: 2005–2012
- Labels: Style Suicide; Mascot; Cool Green; Spinefarm
- Members: Laurence Rene; Jonathan Gaskin; Simon Rolands; Jamie Nicholls; Andé D'Mello
- Past members: Harry B. Wade; John Be
- Website: mypassion.co.uk

My Passion were an English band formed in Hitchin, Hertfordshire, England in 2005. They released their debut album, Corporate Flesh Party, in May 2009 on Cool Green Recordings. Produced by John Mitchell at Outhouse Studios in Reading, the album features eleven tracks, six of which are re-released versions of older demos either presented only on the band's Myspace, or released on their Style Suicide record label. In April 2010, My Passion re-joined John Mitchell at Outhouse to record their second album, titled Inside This Machine. It was initially slated in autumn 2010, however it was finally released on 25 April 2011 through Spinefarm Records, which the band signed to in early 2011. They also have a fan base which was created in 2010 called the 'My Passion Army' which was created by fans.

In July 2009, My Passion failed to beat In Case of Fire to Best British Newcomer at The Kerrang! Awards and in 2010 toured the UK and Ireland on the Kerrang! Relentless Energy Tour. My Passion have played gigs with Kill Hannah, Jeffree Star, InnerPartySystem, The Faint, The Automatic and Julien-K as a support act and also headlined their own tours. They headlined a tour to promote their second album in October 2010.

== History ==
=== Formation – post Shard (2005) ===
My Passion formed in late 2005 after a previous band, glam-rock act, Shard split. The only difference in line up to Shard is that bassist Charlie Pyne was replaced by Simon Rowlands. All other members, childhood friends who grew up and were in bands together from a young age, resumed their roles on their respective instruments. The last months of 2005 were spent writing new material to complement their re-invention and then promoting it on online social networking site, MySpace in preparation for the next year; which included songs such as "Tomorrow Girls", the original recording of "Day of the Bees" and "Never Everland". These tracks were recorded in Rene's home studio but were never released any further than digital recordings on MySpace. In July 2011, the band auctioned off the only CD copies of these songs alongside exclusive merchandise.

=== 2006 ===
On 3 February 2006, My Passion played their first live date under their new name at Simon Price's London goth nightclub, Stay Beautiful. Throughout 2006, My Passion toured and promoted their releases, Make Me Butterfly which is one of Shard's last songs, Bitter Too and Winter For Lovers. The former two had physical CD releases and the latter was available for digital download only. Stylistically, the songs represented an up-tempo and more hard-edged departure from Shard's 2004 album InPerfection, and the earliest My Passion demos, "Modern Way To Madness" and "One Joy Kid", though still used the soft-edged and sometimes ethereal synth textures that made them a popular act with the glam crowd at Stay Beautiful. One new track played live on the 2006 tours was The Fabulous Blood Disco, the title of which became somewhat of a tag-line for the band, being printed on merchandise and used by singer Laurence onstage to describe the band and the live experience. A demo was recorded and although never released officially, some fans claim to have heard it or been played it by the band. This track was also re-recorded for the album. Towards the end of the year, My Passion debuted songs "Hot in the Dolls' House" and "Last Day in Paradise". The former, which would become the A-Side to the next single, was recorded and co-produced by David Ryder-Prangley and had low budget video shot for it which was shown in TopShop's flagship store on Oxford Street, London. The year culminated in a second, celebratory performance at Stay Beautiful on New Year's Eve.

=== 2010–2012 (Corporate Flesh Party) ===
In January and February 2010, My Passion joined All Time Low, The Blackout and Young Guns on the Kerrang! Relentless Energy Drink Tour 2010 where they shared opening slots with Young Guns. After receiving much coverage by Kerrang! during the tour in the form of videos and blog posts, My Passion appeared on the front cover of the magazine.

On 4 March, My Passion released the video to "Crazy and Me". It has since received 47,000 views on YouTube and been screened on Kerrang! Television and Scuzz. Towards the end of March, My Passion played three dates sponsored by Red Bull in Belfast, Dublin and Limerick, before rejoining friends and touring partners Kill Hannah in April for their "Wake Up Sleepers" tour, on which My Passion played many songs from their unreleased second album.

The band went into the studio in April to record these songs into their follow-up to Corporate Flesh Party. The album, entitled Inside This Machine, is currently being mixed by producer John Mitchell and is planned for release in September, as confirmed by René at Slam Dunk Festival in May. My Passion announced a UK headlining tour, the "Inside This Machine Tour", in October 2010 to coincide with the album's release. Songs from My Passion's recently announced second album include "The Girl Who Lost Her Smile" and "Asleep in the Asylum", which have been played at live shows since October 2009, 'The Mess We Made of Our Lives' which has been played since the 2010 European Wake Up The Sleepers tour with Kill Hannah. 'Seven Birds', 'In My Fever' and "My Confession" were revealed in 17 April issue of Kerrang! magazine. "In My Fever" was played by Daniel P. Carter on his Radio 1 Rock Show and Seven Birds was released as a free download via the band's website in July.

On 11 August 2010, My Passion revealed Jamie Nicholls from defunct Alt' rock outfit Firetone as their new drummer. Jonathan Gaskin will continue to play for My Passion as second guitarist, keyboard player and vocalist.

In October 2010, the band toured the UK in the 'Asylum Tour', previously a tour to promote the album Inside This Machine but then became a tour to promote the single "Asleep in the Asylum". Their support acts were Dead by April, Don Broco, Kyra and Summerlin. An extra date was added on Hallowe'en weekend (30 December 2010) for the farewell of the Student's Union of the University of Bedfordshire in Luton in which they played along with Proceed, Don Broco, None the Less and more on its last weekend before the building was closed down completely.

The single "Asleep in the Asylum" entered general sale on 4 October 2010. It contains three tracks: "Asleep in the Asylum, Dream in Colour and Seven Birds".

My Passion released their new album, Inside This Machine, on 18 April 2011 through Spinefarm.

On 25 March 2011, the video for single "The Mess We Made of Our Lives" was released.

The label dropped My Passion after Inside This Machine, and My Passion were not on a record label.

On 1 April, the band was involved in an April Fools prank held by the Kerrang! magazine. In this, the magazine's website created an article in which the band was erroneously reported as dying themselves permanently gold.

They toured on the album Inside This Machine from 21 April to 17 May, in which they performed chippendale style covered entirely in gold paint. Their support was LostAlone alongside Red Bull Bedroom Jam contestants Never Means Maybe and Hearts Under Fire.

The band's second album, Inside This Machine was released on 25 April 2011.

After the band's unsuccessful headline tour, they headed out to support American alternative rock band, Framing Hanely, alongside Leeds punk/rock, The Headstart. The tour started in Newcastle on 27 May and finished in Glasgow on 22 June.

The band released their second single, "The Girl Who Lost Her Smile" on iTunes, accompanied by a DJ Remix and an acoustic version. The video was recorded live at the London dates of the Framing Hanely tour for whom My Passion were main support.

In April 2012, John Be announced his departure from the band and that his replacement would be Ande D'Mello.

The band also had their own signature instruments made by guitar company Cort, and other brands for the kit and a custom mic stand. One of John Be's guitars was given to his step-daughter Robin Armstrong, which her guitarist (Oscar Bankhead) now plays in her band "Near Life Experience", still giving My Passion a reputation to this day.

=== 2012–present (break-up and future projects) ===
On 3 December 2012, My Passion announced that they would break up and issued this statement via their Facebook page:

"Hi guys, My Passion has now been on the road for 7 years, experienced many great things and met some truly marvellous people. Sadly, all good things come to an end and we have decided to call it a day. We are now ready to enter a new chapter in our lives. The main thing that has made the last 7 years so memorable and so much fun was you; the fans. We'd like to take this opportunity to thank all of you who have supported us over the years. You've made the last few years some of the best times of our lives. You really are the best fans and friends we could have hoped for. All of the memories created by the people we have met during our time as My Passion will be cherished and never forgotten. As artists and musicians we will naturally continue to create in the future so we will keep you updated with everything we get up to. The journey doesn't end here and we look forward to the future. Once again, thank you for your support and all the happy memories. My Passion"

Four of the ex-members (Ande, Simon, Jamie and Jonathan) of My Passion announced on Sunday 13 their new band Fort Hope and released their new song Control via their Facebook bandpage. In June 2013 Laurence announced his new act Black Noise, formed with guitarist Nick Kozuch (The October Game), completed by Icelander Egil Rafnsson (previously Sign & Fears) on drums and Josh Elgood's (EDM alias Cruso) electronics & sampling.

== Sponsorships and endorsements ==
Even before being signed by Mascot Records in 2009, My Passion secured many sponsorship deals with companies including Cort Guitars, Hughes and Kettner, Blackstar, Hartke and EBS amplification. Jonathan Gaskin endorsed Stagg Music before switching to using cymbals and hardware by Zildjian between February 2009 and February 2010. Ernie Ball provide the band with plectrums and guitar strings. The band's most prolific sponsorship deal however was arguably with drink corporation, Red Bull. Since signing the deal in 2008, the band have played under the company's banner at Underage, Download Festival and T in The Park Festival, as well as having their music featured on adverts for the Red Bull X Fighters Motocross event and in the teen drama, Freak, in which the characters attend a My Passion gig. The program was broadcast on Myspace.

== Members ==
=== Final line-up ===
- Laurence René – vocals (2005–2012), guitar (2005–2010)
- Jonathan Gaskin – vocals (2005–2012), drums (2005–2010), electronics (2008–2012), guitar (2010–2012)
- Simon Rowlands – bass (2005–2012)
- Ande D'Mello – guitar, vocals (2012)
- Jamie Nicholls – drums (2010–2012)

=== Former members ===
- Harry Wade – guitar, synthesiser (2005–2008)
- John Be – guitar (2005–2012)

== Discography ==
=== Studio albums ===
Year	Album details
2009	Corporate Flesh Party: Released: 25 May 2009; Label: Style Suicide; Format: CD, Download
2011	Inside This Machine: Released: 18 April 2011; Label: Style Suicide; Format: CD, Download

=== EPs ===
Year	Album details
2006	Make Me Butterfly/Die Happy Picnic EP
2006	Bitter Too/Tomorrow Girls EP
2007	Hot in the Dolls House/Last Day in Paradise EP
2014	Living in the Shadows

=== Singles ===
- "Winter For Lovers" (2006)
- "BooMan" (2007)
- "Day of the Bees" (2008)
- "Crazy and Me" (2008)
- "Thanks for Nothing" (Free Download, 2009)
- "Day of the Bees" (re-release) (2009)
- "Vultures Are People Too" (Free download, 2009)
- "Crazy & Me" (re-release) (2010)
- "Seven Birds" (Free download, July 2010)
- "Asleep in the Asylum" (2010)
- "The Mess We Made of Our Lives" (2011)
- "The Girl Who Lost Her Smile" (2011)
- "Never Let You Go" (Free Download, 2012)

=== Demos ===
- After Calais – Demo (Free download, 2007)

=== Videography ===
- One Joy Kid (2005)
- Modern Way To Madness (2006)
- Hot in the Doll's House (2007)
- Day of the Bees (2008, "DIY" Version)
- Never Everland (2009, Presently Unreleased)
- Day of the Bees (2009)
- Crazy and Me (2010)
- Asleep in the Asylum (2010)
- The Mess We Made of Our Lives (2011)
- The Girl Who Lost Her Smile (2011)
- Lily White Lies (2011)
