= Now, Voyager (album) =

Studio album by The Cape Race
- Released: July 4, 2011
- Recorded: October 2010 at Earth Terminal Studios, Odiham, Hampshire.
- Genre: Indie rock
- Length: 28.08
- Label: Self-release
- Producer: Peter Miles

Singles from Now, Voyager
- 1. "They're Young, They're In Love" Released: 1 January 2011; 2. "Little Whites" Released: 4 April 2011; 3. "The Reprieve" Released: 19 August 2011

Now, Voyager is the debut mini-album by Manchester rock band The Cape Race. It was self-released on 4 July 2011 for free from thecaperace.com/nowvoyager.

== Track listing ==
| No. | Title | Length |
|---|---|---|
| 1. | "Little Whites" | 4:38 |
| 2. | "They're Young, They're In Love" | 3:55 |
| 3. | "The Reprieve" | 4:12 |
| 4. | "Bets" | 5:06 |
| 5. | "Barcelona" | 4:14 |
| 6. | "Now, Voyager" | 6:06 |

== Title ==
It was revealed in an interview with vocalist David Moloney that the origin of the title came from the poem ‘The Untold Want’ by Walt Whitman. Moloney said "It’s about people who don’t settle for what they are given and take it upon themselves to better their situation and create the life they want for themselves. I thought it was a good summation of The Cape Race and how it came to be."

== Personnel ==
The Cape Race

- David Moloney - Vocals
- Matt Sayward - Guitar, additional percussion, group vocals
- Scott Perkins - Guitar, additional percussion
- Adam Lewis - Bass, backing vocals
- Jonny Davys - Drums

Producer

- Peter Miles

Engineer

- Daniel Hayes

Additional performances

- Luke Leighfield - Piano, keyboard and organ
- Duncan Howsley - Group vocals on They're Young, They're In Love and Barcelona
- Daniel Hayes - Group vocals on They're Young, They're In Love and Barcelona

== Locations ==
Recorded

- Earth Terminal Studios, Odiham, Hampshire

Mixed

- Earth Terminal Studios, Odiham, Hampshire & Middle Farm Studios, Combe Park, Bickington, Devon.

Mastered

- Middle Farm Studios, Combe Park, Bickington, Devon & The Loft, Kerridge, Cheshire.

== Critical acclaim ==
Album Of The Year - Music From Rainy Skies

Rock Sound (7/10)

All-Gigs (4/5)

Bring The Noise

Forgetting Anna
