= TFN Group =

The TFN Group was a facility management company based in Vitry-sur-Seine, France. TFN Group was founded as TFN Propreté in 1944 by Paul JULIEN as a contract cleaning business.

TFN’s activities included cleaning services, security, building maintenance and repairs, hygiene and gardening. Its services were marketed under several brands including Lancry Securite, Ecotherm, Batimmo and Azur Net.

== History ==
The TFN group was founded in 1944 by Paul Julien as a contract cleaning business. Paul Julien was succeeded by his son, Jean-Pierre. In 2002, Jean-Pierre Julien’s son, Franck, was appointed as chairman of the company. TFN Group was subsequently renamed as ATALIAN Global Services in 2009.

== See also ==
- Franck Julien
