= Natives (band) =

Pop rock band from The New Forest, United Kingdom

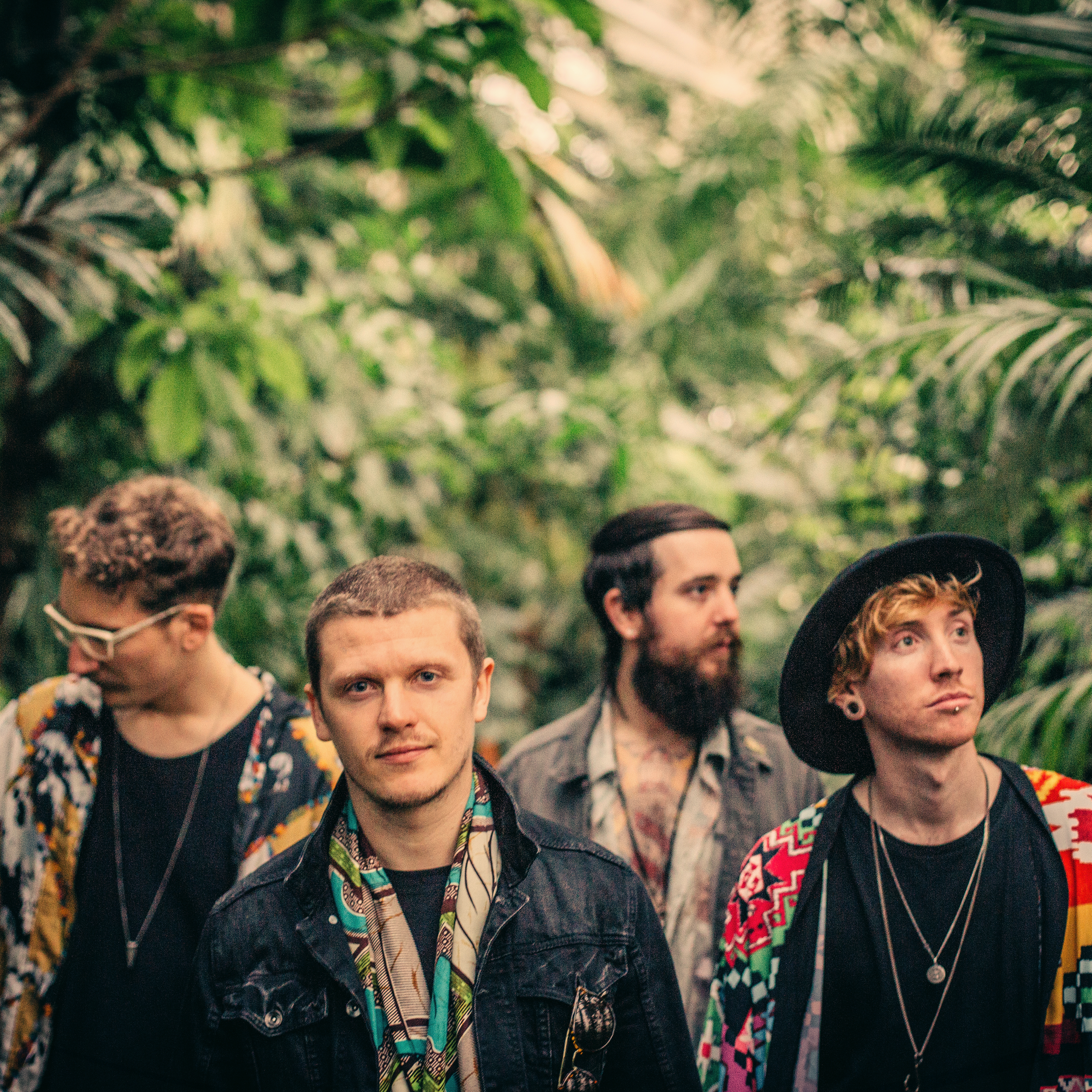
- From left to right: Jack Fairbrother, Jim Thomas, Greg Day, Andy White

Background information
- Origin: United Kingdom
- Genres: Pop rock, pop punk
- Years active: 2012– present
- Labels: LAB Records, Transmission Recordings
- Members: Andy White; Greg Day; Jack Fairbrother; Jim Thomas

Natives is a pop rock band from The New Forest, United Kingdom. The four-piece band consists of Andy White (drums and percussion), Greg Day (bass), Jack Fairbrother (guitar, keyboards), and Jim Thomas (vocals).

== History ==
=== From Not Advised to Natives (2012–2013) ===
The band was initially formed by Jack Fairbrother, Andy White, and Greg Day when they started jamming together at school. Jim Thomas and Ash Oliver, both originally from different bands, soon joined their group. Prior to becoming Natives, the members played together under the name Not Advised. Feeling like they needed a fresh start from their Not Advised days, they soon renamed themselves Natives. This was shortly after flying to Los Angeles to begin recording their debut full-length album with platinum-selling producer John Feldmann.

=== Indoor War (2014–2015) ===
On 13 November 2013 the band announced they had signed record and publishing deals with Transmission Recordings and Notting Hill Music.

On 21 January 2014, Natives announced the release of their debut full-length album Indoor War. The album was released on 17 March 2014 on Transmission Recordings.

Indoor War tells the story of a character named Alvima, who suffers from a huge loss and cannot deal with the pain. He then decides that he will live his life making decisions based on logic and science rather than emotions—a resolution of struggle between love and logic. The first half of the album lyrically talks about the tragic low points, where Alvima logically embraces his fate. The second half of the album talks about Alvima giving into embracing his emotions. There is a shift of balance from darkness and logic to feelings of positivity, love, and life.

On 22 February 2014, the band performed at the 7107 International Music Festival in the Philippines on the main stage alongside Empire of the Sun and Red Hot Chili Peppers.

On 27 February 2014, Natives officially premiered the music video for "Can't Say No".

=== Second studio album (2016–present) ===
On 28 February 2016, the band posted a video to their Facebook page. The video explained that the band had been working on new material for the past 18 months and announced the departure of Ash Oliver for personal reasons.

On 1 March 2016, Natives released their first new material in almost two years. The track "Chasing Lions" premiered at The 405 with the site describing it as "sonically fearless". "Chasing Lions" received worldwide blog support and reached number 4 on blog aggregator Hype Machine's Twitter chart.

An official music video followed on 11 March. The video features three people communicating the lyrics to the track in different ways; one through sign language, one through interpretive dance and one through song. The band posted the video on their social media sites with the message: "We gave Hannah, Sheldon and Tori our lyrics and through sign language, dance and song they each, in their own way, helped tell the story of Chasing Lions. Music is the one language the whole world can understand."

The following single, "Stop the Rain", was released on 11 July 2016. Several months later, they released a free download single, "Passion", on 16 November 2016.

== Critical reception ==
"Chasing Lions" received positive reviews, with the 405 calling the song "sonically fearless". Vinyl Noise commented: "'Chasing Lions' comes sun kissed in a new sound, more electronic than before, but not too over the top. They still fit the tribal-pop bill, but with synths and glitches sprinkled on top." Furthermore, Popped Music said: "Some songs just have impact on the first listen and Natives' first track in over a year, 'Chasing Lions,' has had just that."

Indoor War received positive reviews, with HMV commenting: "This is pure, unadulterated, unconcerned pop-rock. The choruses are the size of small countries; the melodies are smooth as freshly woven silk and the production is clean, as you like. Think early Jimmy Eat World, vintage Taking Back Sunday, Bruce Springsteen when he really goes for it, all mixed up with some Oasis-style huge production." Rock Sound praised the band for treading new ground within the pop-rock genre: "Indoor War pushes Natives beyond pop rock and into something genuinely intriguing." Kerrang! said that the band "sound a little unsure of themselves at times on Indoor War. But that's mostly because they've based the lyrics on a story about a fictional character, Alvima, who overcomes a huge loss".

== Discography ==
=== Albums ===
Year	Title	Release date	Label
2014	Indoor War	17 March 2014	Transmission Recordings

=== Extended plays ===
Year	Title	Release date	Label
2012	This Island	26 June 2012	HiTone Music
2013	Stand for Something	13 May 2013	HiTone Music
2013	Going in Alone	17 December 2013	Transmission Recordings
2014	The Horizon	10 October 2014	Transmission Recordings

=== Singles ===
Year	Title	Release date	Label
2014	"Can't Say No"	7 March 2014	Transmission Recordings
2014	"Ghost"	25 May 2014	Transmission Recordings
2016	"Chasing Lions"	18 March 2016	LAB Records, Ltd / Santi Collective
2016	"Stop the Rain"	11 July 2016	LAB Records, Ltd / Santi Collective
2016	"Passion"	16 November 2016	LAB Records, Ltd / Santi Collective
2017	"Warpaint"	27 January 2017	LAB Records, Ltd / Santi Collective
2017	"Pray"	20 October 2017	LAB Records, Ltd / Santi Collective
2018	"Feels Like Home"	26 December 2018	LAB Records, Ltd / Santi Collective
