= Fort Hope =

British musical group

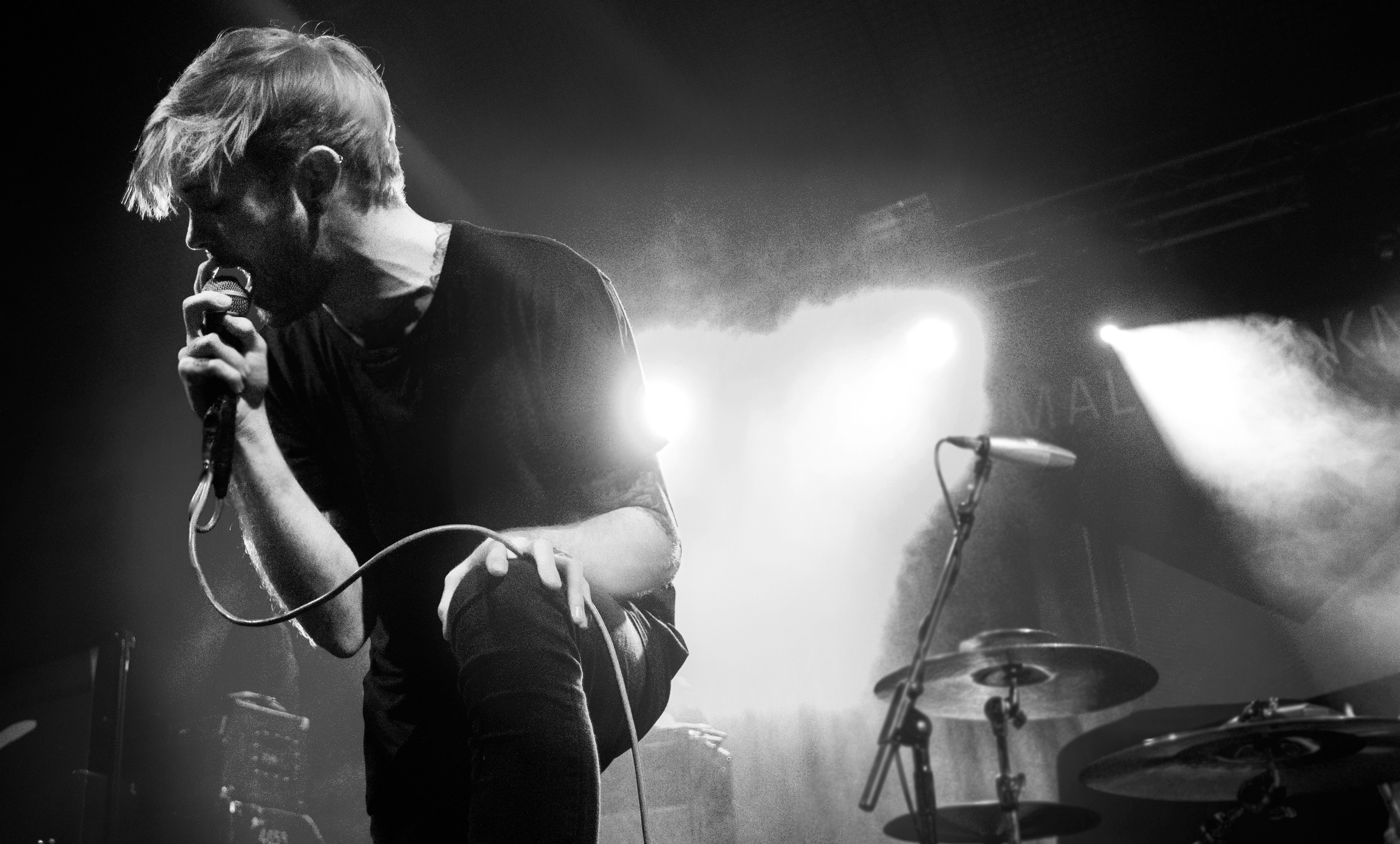
- Jon Gaskin of Fort Hope performing in Club 85, North Hertfordshire in 2013.

Background information
- Origin: Hertfordshire, England
- Genres: Alternative rock; post-hardcore; pop rock
- Years active: 2013–2017 - 2022 - present
- Labels: LAB; Virgin EMI
- Members: Jonathan Gaskin; Jamie Nicholls; Simon Rowlands; Peter Oliver

Fort Hope are a British rock band formed in Hertfordshire, England, in 2013. After releasing a series of EPs and the mini album Courage (LAB Records), which charted at number 8 on the UK Rock & Metal Albums Chart, the band issued their debut album through Virgin EMI in 2016 and continue to tour, record and work on new projects.

== History ==
=== Formation and initial EP releases (2013) ===
The band consists of three former members of the electronic rock band My Passion: Jonathan Gaskin, Simon Rowlands and Jamie Nicholls. They announced Fort Hope on 13 January 2013 with the release of their first song titled 'Control'. The song was aired on BBC Radio the following month, and in April the band completed their first ever UK tour supporting Fearless Vampire Killers throughout April in the UK.

The band’s first release came later that year with their debut EP 'The Future's in Our Hearts', which was made available as a free download after being streamed online in June. "Control" was issued as the EP’s official single, accompanied by the band’s first music video. In November they released their second EP titled 'Choices'.

=== Tours and releases (2013-2015) ===
Fort Hope began to build momentum on the UK live circuit in 2013, performing a series of early support slots. In May 2013, the band supported We Are the In Crowd and Never Shout Never in London. They also supported Andrew McMahon during his UK tour, including his show at Birmingham’s Glee Club on 20 May 2013 and a performance at London’s Union Chapel on 23 May 2013. The band additionally appeared at KOKO, Camden, in June 2013, supporting Jimmy Eat World. Later that year, the band opened up for We Are The Ocean and The Maine on their joint co-headline tour in November.

In January 2014 Fort Hope embarked on a UK tour along with Max Raptor, making it their first tour as a headliner and they were also announced to be part of the LAB Records roster and would be releasing their debut mini album titled 'Courage' on 11 May. To promote the release the band released an official music video for the song 'The Rapture'. Alongside their headline activity, the band continued to secure support slots throughout the year. They performed with Ghost Town in London on 4 June 2014, and later supported Anberlin at the Electric Ballroom on 14 August 2014.

In July the band released their music video for the song 'New Life' and a month later the band performed at Sonisphere Festival. The band also supported rock band Mallory Knox in the UK throughout November along with Frank Iero and Moose Blood.

On 7 November the band released their second single titled 'Plans' in promotion of their third EP release named after the band which was released on 8 February 2015. They also released 'Sick' as the second single to promote the EP and released a music video for 'Plans' two days prior to the EPs release.

In 2015, the band continued touring, including a return to KOKO, Camden, supporting Finch on 2 June 2015. Their festival profile also grew, with a performance at Reading Festival, and they were later included in Soundboard Reviews’ list of “10 New Acts To See At Reading & Leeds 2015”.

Fort Hope also received continued support from BBC Radio 1 and were nominated for "Best British Newcomer" at the 2015 Kerrang! Awards, alongside Royal Blood, Moose Blood, As It Is and Ashestoangels. During the summer, the band performed on the Fresh Blood stage at Slam Dunk Festival, and appeared at 2000 Trees Festival and T in the Park.

=== 2016–2018 ===
In 2016, Fort Hope signed with Virgin EMI. During this period, the band released several EPs, including Manne of Lawe in April 2016 and Armure in December 2016. The band also released their debut studio album, The Flood Flowers (Vol. 1), on 16 June 2017..

Tour Dates

On Saturday 30 April 2016 the band supported American post-hardcore band Saosin at O2 Academy Islington. Fort Hope also appeared at Download Festival on 20 June 2016, where they were featured among the notable up‑and‑coming bands of the year. To promote the release of their forthcoming Armure EP, the band embarked on a seven date UK tour with support from Tigress and Ashes to Angels. The tour concluded with a headline show at The Underworld in Camden on October 29th.

Throughout 2016 and 2017, the band toured extensively across the UK, performing headline dates and festival appearances. This included a return to Slam Dunk Festival, opening the event across all three dates. The band also toured with acts such as Area 11 and Ryan Hamilton and the Traitors. Fort Hope parted ways with Virgin EMI in 2018. Following this period, the band reduced their public activity and focused on songwriting and studio work, a period that coincided with the wider disruption to live music during the COVID-19 pandemic.

=== Return and new releases (2022-present) ===
Fort Hope resumed activity in September 2022, announcing a series of live dates supporting LostAlone in December of that year. In August 2023, the band confirmed that Peter Oliver, a long-time collaborator, had joined as a full member. They subsequently released the single "Powers" in September 2023, followed by "Sandbags". In March 2024, Fort Hope released the EP Palaces Palaces. Around this period, the band returned to live performance, undertaking a UK tour and performing headline shows, including dates in London. In December 2025, Fort Hope toured as special guests on Call Me Amour’s UK headline tour, appearing alongside additional support acts including Royals.

The band returned to the studio in 2026 to write and record further material.

== Members ==
=== Current ===
- Jon Gaskin – vocals, guitar, piano (2013–present)
- Jamie Nicholls – drums (2013–present)
- Simon Rowlands – bass guitar (2013–present)
- Peter Oliver – guitar (2015–present)

=== Unofficial members ===
- Matthew Whelan – guitar (2014–2015)

=== Previous members ===
- Ande D'Mello – guitar (2013–2015)

== Discography ==
Fort Hope discography
- Studio albums: 1
- EPs: 6
- Singles: 3
- Music videos: 7
- Mini-albums: 1

=== Albums ===
Title	Album details
The Flood Flowers (Vol. 1)	Release: 16 June 2017; Label: EMI Records; Formats: CD, download

=== Mini-albums ===
Title	Album details	Peak chart positions
Title	Album details	UK; Rock
Courage	Release: 11 May 2014; Label: LAB Records; Formats: CD, download	8

=== EPs ===
Title	Album details
The Future's in Our Hearts	Release: 24 June 2013; Label: Self-released; Formats: CD
Choices	Release: 12 November 2013; Label: Self-released; Formats: Download
Fort Hope	Release: 8 February 2015; Label: LAB Records; Formats: CD, Download
Manne of Lawe	Release: 22 April 2016; Label: Virgin EMI Records; Formats: Download, Vinyl
A r m u r e .	Release: 2 December 2016; Label: Virgin EMI Records; Formats: Download
Palaces Palaces	Release: 1 March 2024; Label: Self-released; Formats: Download

=== Singles ===
Title	Year	Album
"Control"	2013	Courage
"Plans"	2015	Fort Hope
"That's The Way The River Flows"	2016	Manne Of Lawe EP
"Powers"	2023	Powers

=== Music videos ===
Title	Year	Album
"Control"	2013	Courage
"The Rapture"	2014	Courage
"New Life"	2014	Courage
"Plans"	2015	Fort Hope
"Skies"	2015	Fort Hope
"That's The Way The River Flows"	2016	Manne of Lawe
"Say No"	2016	A r m u r e
"The People Of The Lake"	2017	The Flood Flowers (Vol. 1)
