= Corporate Flesh Party =

Studio album by My Passion
- Released: 25 May 2009
- Recorded: Outhouse Studios in Reading, Berkshire, UK
- Genre: Rock, electronica, dance-punk
- Length: 43:48
- Label: Style Suicide, Mascot/Cool Green Recordings
- Producer: John Mitchell

My Passion chronology
Corporate Flesh Party (2009)	Inside This Machine (2011)

Professional ratings
Review scores
Source	Rating
Rock Sound	7/10 stars

Corporate Flesh Party is the debut album by English rock band My Passion. Released in May 2009 on the band's Style Suicide Record Label as a limited edition run of 2,000 copies, it was re-released in June 2009 on Mascot Records. Promo music videos have been released for the tracks 'Day Of The Bees' and 'Crazy & Me'.

== Track listing ==
1. "Crazy & Me" – 3:58
2. "Play Dirty" – 3:37
3. "Day Of The Bees" – 4:00
4. "Never Everland" – 4:16
5. "Winter For Lovers" – 4:55
6. "Hot In The Dolls House" – 4:16
7. "After Calais" – 2:06
8. "Thanks For Nothing" – 3:50
9. "The Fabulous Blood Disco" – 4:16
10. "Plastic Flesh Garden" – 4:25
11. "Vultures Are People Too" – 4:16

== Personnel ==
- Laurence René - Vocals, Guitar
- John Be - Guitar
- Simon Rowlands - Bass
- Jonathan Gaskin - Guitar, Vocals, Electronics/Synth, Drums
