= Blitz Kids (band) =

English rock band

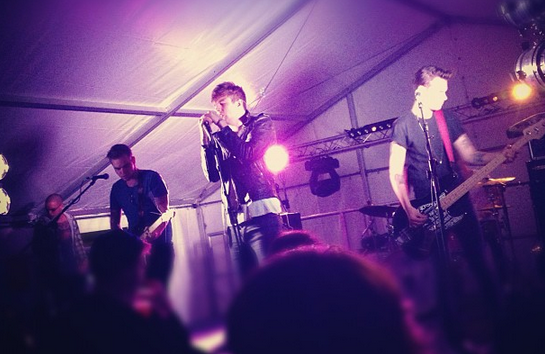

Background information
- Also known as: Rig Up Explosive (2006-2009)
- Origin: Nantwich and Crewe, Cheshire, England
- Genres: Alternative rock, pop punk
- Years active: 2006–2015
- Labels: LAB Records; Red Bull Records; Visible Noise
- Past members: Eddie Hawx; Billy Evanson; Joe James; Jono Yates; Nic Montgomery; Matt Freer
- Website: blitzkidsofficial.com

Blitz Kids were an English alternative rock band originating from Nantwich and Crewe, Cheshire, England.

== History ==
The band was formed in 2006 by original members Joe James, Jono Yates, Nic Montgomery, Billy Evanson and Eddie Hawx. The band was initially named "Rig Up Explosive", but the name was changed to Blitz Kids in 2009. The name meaning was explained to be inspired by Joe's grandfather who was in a gang who named themselves 'Blitz Kids' during the events of World War II.

The band released two EPs on LAB Records, Scavengers and Decisions, prior to their debut album Vagrants and Vagabonds.

Evanson and Hawx left the band because of personal issues in 2012. Matt Freer joined the band on drums in later 2012 and they released a third EP entitled Never Die.

The band recorded their second album in the summer of 2013 in Los Angeles with John Feldmann. The album, titled The Good Youth, was released on 20 January 2014.

The band announced on 3 July 2015 that they have decided to part ways on good terms, however in the process of their break up the band cancelled an upcoming tour.

== Tours and festivals ==
Significant tours Blitz Kids have embarked on include opening for D.R.U.G.S. in the UK in March 2011, opening for Mayday Parade in the UK in May 2011, and touring with Australian pop-punk band Tonight Alive in October 2012 across the UK. To support the release of Never Die Blitz Kids went on a headline tour of the UK in December 2012 with Evarose as main support on most dates.

Blitz Kids have played a number of UK festivals, including the Red Bull stage at Sonisphere Festival UK in 2010, Hevy Festival the same year, then the Introducing Stage at Slam Dunk in 2011 as well as Download Festival in the summer of 2011. They also played Radstock Festival in Liverpool in March 2013.

In January 2013, Blitz Kids were named the support band for American pop punk band We The Kings tour of the UK. Almost straight off the back of this tour they were named main support for Lower Than Atlantis's tour of Europe. This tour came just days after being announced to be playing Download Festival and Slam Dunk Festival. In April 2013 the band parted with Hassle Records and signed with Red Bull Records, and, along with Big Sixes, supported the British rock band Canterbury on their UK tour, before Canterbury then went on to tour Europe without Blitz Kids. Later in the year the band was a support act for rock band Mallory Knox. After that tour they were named as main support for pop punk band All Time Low across Europe in February and March 2014. In August 2014 they played at Merthyr Rock, along with Reel Big Fish and Anti-Flag. In late September/early October 2014, Blitz Kids had their own headline tour, supported by Natives and Scholars.

The band announced a summer 2015 UK tour stating it would be the last for a while. On 3 July, it was announced that the band had broken up and that the summer tour was cancelled, but the band performed two farewell shows in October 2015. Blitz Kids broke up on 10 October 2015.

== Former members ==
- Joe James – vocals (2006–2015)
- Jono Yates – guitar, backing vocals (2006–2015)
- Nic Montgomery – bass, backing vocals (2006–2015)
- Matt Freer – drums (2012–2015)
- Eddie Hawx – drums (2006–2012)
- Billy Evanson – guitar (2006–2012)

== Discography ==
Blitz Kids discography
- Studio albums: 2
- Extended plays: 3
- Singles: 8

=== Studio ===
Year	Album details
2011	Vagrants & Vagabonds: Released: 11 July 2011; Label: Hassle Records; Format: CD, music download
2014	The Good Youth: Released: 20 January 2014; Label: Red Bull Records; Format: CD, music download

=== EP ===
Year	Album details
2010	Scavengers: Released: 26 April 2010; Label: Small Town Records; Format: Music download
2011	Decisions: Released: 7 March 2011; Label: Small Town Records; Format: Music download
2012	Never Die: Released: 26 November 2012; Label: Hassle Records; Format: Music download

=== Singles ===
Year	Single	Album
2011	"Story"	Vagrants & Vagabonds
2011	"Hold Fast"	Vagrants & Vagabonds
2012	"Never Die"	Never Die
2013	"On My Own"	The Good Youth
2013	"Run For Cover"	The Good Youth
2014	"Sometimes"	The Good Youth
2014	"Perfect"	The Good Youth
2015	"Keep Swinging"	The Good Youth

== Nominations and achievements ==
Blitz Kids were nominated for 'Best British Newcomers' at the Kerrang! Awards in 2011, but lost out to Asking Alexandria.
