= Days in December =

- Origin: London, England
- Genre: Post-hardcore
- Years active: 2002 – 2007
- Label: Unsigned
- Spinoffs: New Device
- Past members: Daniel Leigh; Phil Kinman; Rob Turnbridge; Robb Wybrow; Gary Tough; Frankie Torpey; Alan Payne; Ian Rees
- Website: www.daysindecember.com

Days in December were a London-based rock band. In 2004, they released the EP Countless Hours Making Waves through Mighty Atom Records.

== Biography ==
=== Formation ===
Days in December formed in London in December 2002, from which the band took its name. Its debut single was "Comfort in Surrounding Space". The band subsequently performed with acts including Funeral for a Friend, Hondo Maclean, Beecher and Hiding with Girls.After numerous lineup changes, the band's final incarnation included Daniel Leigh (vocals), Phil Kinman (lead guitar), Robb Wybrow (guitar & vocals), Rob Turnbridge (bass guitar), and Frankie Torpey (drums).

=== Progression ===
Days in December completed tours alongside Funeral for a Friend (whose drummer Ryan Richards contributed vocals to the track "Last Chance Before The Storm"), Bullet For My Valentine, SikTh, Beloved, Dead Poetic, and Armor for Sleep, as well performances on the 2005 Taste Of Chaos UK tour, at the 2006 "Full Ponty" festival, and at the National Adventure Sports Show.

The band was acclaimed with "Single of the Week" in Kerrang magazine, for their EP "Countless Hours Making Waves", and undertook an interview for Iron Maiden's "Bruce Dickinson Radio Show" on BBC Radio 6 Music.

Days in December released the five-track album Deleted Scenes on 11 September 2006.

=== Final tour ===
Days In December toured the UK for the final time in the latter half of 2007, including farewell dates at: Cardiff Barfly, Camden Underworld and Southampton Joiners. The band marked their end with the closure of their website and an official announcement on MySpace.

=== Subsequent projects ===
Daniel Leigh, Phil Kinman and Robb Wybrow formed the band New Device after Days in December split up. New Device went on to tour with Gun, Backyard Babies and Heaven's Basement, supported Bon Jovi at The O2 Arena (London) in 2010, and played at the Download Festival, Sonisphere Festival, Hard Rock Hell Festival, and the 2010 High Voltage Festival.

Frontman Daniel Leigh has also worked on solo material, and has collaborated with Gun, Mark Morriss and Chris Difford. Leigh's debut solo E.P. "My Little Eye" was scheduled for release in early 2012.

Since leaving New Device, Phil Kinman has worked as a record producer on releases such as the 2012 album War Nation by the band Tank and The King and the Bishop by Deadly Circus Fire.

== Final lineup ==
- Daniel Leigh – Vocals
- Phil Kinman – Lead guitar
- Robb Wybrow – Guitar, vocals
- Rob Turnbridge – Bass guitar
- Frankie Torpey – Drums

== Discography ==
Year	Release	Label
2003	Comfort in Surrounding Space	Alaska Records
2004	Countless Hours Making Waves	Mighty Atom Records
2006	Deleted Scenes (mini-album)	Deck Cheese Records

== See also ==
- List of bands from England
