= Polymorphic Code =

Studio album by the Algorithm
- Released: 19 November 2012
- Recorded: 2012
- Genre: Progressive metal; electronic music
- Length: 48:09
- Label: Basick
- Producer: The Algorithm

The Algorithm chronology
Critical Error (2010)	Polymorphic Code (2012)	Octopus4 (2014)

Singles from Polymorphic Code
- 1. "Trojans" Released: 7 November 2012

Polymorphic Code is the debut studio album by French musical project the Algorithm, released on 19 November 2012 through Basick Records. Music video for the song "Trojans" was released on 7 November 2012.

== Critical reception ==
Professional ratings
Review scores
Source	Rating
Rock Sound	6/10

Eli Enis, writing for Revolver, described it as a "crossover of prog/tech-metal and hard electronica", impressed by the "exactly right" balance the two genres.

Hit the Floor characterized it as "chiptune, breakcore, DJ'd metal, and dubstep.

The Circle Pit magazine deemed the song "Handshake" to have a "throwback to an Algorithm classic, 'Boucle Infinite'", considering it a highlight on Polymorphic Code. Additionally, the magazine editor admired the album's flow, nicely balancing between heaviness, electronics, and ambiance. They however criticized the quality of some of the synthetic instruments, explaining that "generally they sound legit, but every once and awhile they sound faker than my ears prefer".

== Track listing ==
Polymorphic Code track listing
No.	Title	Length
1.	"Handshake"	4:23
2.	"Bouncing Dot"	5:18
3.	"Trojans"	4:34
4.	"Access Granted"	6:46
5.	"Logic Bomb"	4:35
6.	"Warp Gate Exploit"	5:47
7.	"Null"	4:26
8.	"Panic"	12:17
Total length:		48:09

== Personnel ==
- Rémi Gallego – synthesizer, sequencer, guitar, programming, production
- Tim Reynolds – mastering
