= Countless Hours Making Waves =

EP by Days in December
- Released: 19 July 2004
- Genre: Post Hardcore
- Length: 17:25

Days in December chronology
Comfort in Surrounding Space (2003)	Countless Hours Making Waves (2004)	Deleted Scenes (2006)

Countless Hours Making Waves is the debut EP by British rock / post-hardcore band Days in December. The EP was released on 19 July 2004.

Three of the bandmembers from Days in December went on to form the band New Device in 2007.

== Track listing ==
1. "Bright Lights"
2. "One Year Late"
3. "Interlude"
4. "Glass Vice"
5. "Last Chance Before the Storm"
6. "Glass Vice" (video)
