= At the Dream's Edge =

Studio album by Chimp Spanner
- Released: December 8, 2009; April 10, 2010 (Re-issue)
- Genre: Progressive metal, djent, ambient
- Length: 60:50
- Label: Unsigned, Basick Records (Re-issue)
- Producer: Paul Ortiz

Chimp Spanner chronology
Imperium Vorago (2005)	At the Dream's Edge (2009)	All Roads Lead Here (2012)

Professional ratings
Review scores
Source	Rating
Kerrang!	3/5 stars

At The Dream's Edge is Chimp Spanner's second album, independently released in December 2009. It was re-released by Basick Records in 2010 after Chimp Spanner signed to them. This is the first Chimp Spanner album to feature an 8 string guitar, which was used on the songs "At The Dream's Edge", "Bad Code", "Far From Home" and "Under One Sky". Coming in at almost an hour and one minute, this is Chimp Spanner's longest album to date.

== Track listing ==
All music is composed by Chimp Spanner.

No.	Title	Length
1.	"Galaxy Rise"	0:53
2.	"Supererogation"	5:30
3.	"At The Dream's Edge"	3:51
4.	"The Mirror"	8:36
5.	"Bad Code"	5:05
6.	"Harvey Wallbanger"	4:29
7.	"Ghosts of the Golden City"	2:01
8.	"Far From Home"	4:41
9.	"Terminus Pt I"	3:18
10.	"Terminus Pt II"	6:37
11.	"Terminus Pt III"	4:42
12.	"Under One Sky"	5:43
13.	"All Good Things"	5:14
Total length:		60:50

== Personnel ==
Chimp Spanner

- Paul Ortiz - guitars, bass, keyboards, drum programming and production
