= James May's Man Lab =

- Series Two Title Card (2011)
- Genre: Popular science
- Created by: James May
- Written by: James May; Henry Dalton; Will Daws
- Directed by: Tom Whitter
- Creative director: Simeon Oakley
- Presented by: James May
- Theme music composer: "Dr James May BMus"
- Country of origin: United Kingdom
- Original language: English
- No. of series: 3
- No. of episodes: 13

Production
- Executive producer: Will Daws
- Producers: Tom Whitter; Rebecca Magill; Henry Dalton
- Editors: Henry Dalton; Alex Sutcliffe
- Running time: 60 minutes

Original release
- Network: BBC Two; BBC HD (2010–13); BBC Two HD (2013-)
- Release: 31 October 2010 – 25 April 2013

James May's Man Lab is a British television series presented by former presenter of Top Gear and The Grand Tour James May. The first, three-part series was aired on BBC Two between 31 October and 14 November 2010. The second, five-part series was aired between 25 October and 18 December 2011. Repeats of Series 2 continued on late night BBC One with signing for the deaf throughout January 2012.

Series 3 began broadcasting in March 2013, after Top Gear finished Series 19. Series One was released on DVD on 7 November 2011 by Acorn Media UK, followed by Series Two on 8 October 2012.

== Premise ==
The series explores traditional skills that are being lost by the modern man, and shows how to stop them from being lost forever. Each episode has a variety of themed tasks, including construction, seduction, destruction and more. If science, geometry, maths, logic and explosives can be used in these tasks, so much the better. Tasks include sending a dead pet's ashes into space using a homemade hydrogen balloon, creating one's own smelting furnace, constructing a pool table, felling a tree using explosives, escaping from Dartmoor prison whilst avoiding detection from expert trackers and making a magnetic ceiling panel to throw your keys at so you don't lose them.

The first series also had a celebrity man task, where a celebrity attempted to beat a personal best at a certain 'man task', such as changing a tyre; however, this aspect was not continued into series two. The theme tune was written by May himself and is often played live over the end credits by a variety of different performers, including barber shop quartet, bagpipes and more.

== Series overview ==
| Series | Episodes | Originally aired | |
| Series | Episodes | First aired | Last aired |
|---|---|---|---|
| 1 | 3 | 31 October 2010 | 14 November 2010 |
| 2 | 5 | 25 October 2011 | 18 December 2011 |
| 3 | 5 | 28 March 2013 | 25 April 2013 |

== Episodes ==
=== Series one (2010) ===
| No. overall | No. in season | Guest | Directed by | Original release date |
|---|---|---|---|---|
| 1 | 1 | Alexander Armstrong | Tom Whitter | 31 October 2010 |
James shows how to defuse a WWII bomb, builds a concrete kitchen worktop, teaches the art of seduction in the style of Thomas Campion (1567 – 1620), learns how to polish a boot, builds a large scale model railway, makes a fish finger sandwich and builds a radio control powered picnic table.
| 2 | 2 | John Sergeant | Tom Whitter | 7 November 2010 |
James shows how to build your own bar, navigate the seas using the powder of sympathy and a dog, how to duel with percussion pistols, stop running out of toilet paper and build an orchestra composed of grade 1 level musicians.
| 3 | 3 | Hugh Dennis | Tom Whitter | 14 November 2010 |
James shows how to make an old movie and how to build a cinema, how to duel with sabres and how to act on a first date, and showcases the Grade 1 orchestra performance at St Martin-in-the-Fields.

=== Series two (2011) ===
| No. overall | No. in season | Guest | Directed by | Original release date |
|---|---|---|---|---|
| 4 | 1 | Oz Clarke | Tom Whitter | 25 October 2011 |
James and Oz escape HMP Dartmoor and go orienteering; James builds a pool table, draws a portrait and Rory shows how difficult it is to remember names of party guests.
| 5 | 2 | Love Fungus | Tom Whitter | 1 November 2011 |
James reunites Love Fungus, an indie rock band that split up 20 years ago, at the High Voltage Festival; fells a tree to make toilet paper and goes ghost hunting in Lympne Castle, Kent.
| 6 | 3 | None | Tom Whitter | 8 November 2011 |
James casts a lemon squeezer using a home made furnace, teaches how to cheat at playing guitar, launches the ashes of late pets into the stratosphere, and promotes the boiler suit as the only necessary clothing needed by the modern man.
| 7 | 4 | Neil Ruddock | Tom Whitter | 15 November 2011 |
James attempts to prove an Englishman can score a penalty, builds a coracle out of willow, creates a greenhouse in the toilets, and builds a multifunctional "Swiss Army Bike".
| 8 | 5 | Oz Clarke | Tom Whitter | 18 December 2011 |
James and Oz attempt to make it snow; James shows how to cook Christmas dinner using strict timing and legislation, how to make an exciting Christmas cracker and how to decorate a Christmas tree without using a step ladder.

=== Series three (2013) ===
On 9 July 2012, May announced on his Facebook page that filming had started on the third series. In January 2013, May announced via his Twitter that Man Lab was due to air in March, after the next series of Top Gear had finished. The series began at 8pm on 28 March 2013.

| No. overall | No. in season | Guest | Directed by | Original release date |
|---|---|---|---|---|
| 9 | 1 | Oz Clarke | Tom Whitter | 28 March 2013 |
James creates his very own pizza oven. James and Oz Clarke send side-kick Rory on a wine tasting mission, and James commentates on the 2012 Grand National.
| 10 | 2 | Neil Ruddock | Tom Whitter | 4 April 2013 |
James chases lightning and competes in the rock-paper-scissors world championships. Side-kick Rory is also sent to Wales to mine coal to aid James in making soap, and the team strap cameras on cats in order to improve a Neighbourhood Watch scheme.
| 11 | 3 | Judy James and Richard Knight | Tom Whitter | 11 April 2013 |
James helps throw buns in Abingdon as part of the Diamond Jubilee celebrations across Oxfordshire. The Man Lab also builds a revolutionary type of water clock and tests once and for all whether it is possible to make your own luck in Russian beer roulette. In an effort to create a universal language, James travels to Brussels and puts his mimic skills to the test between the Royal Belgian Institute of Natural Sciences and the famous Manneken Pis.
| 12 | 4 | None | Tom Whitter | 18 April 2013 |
The team enhances the office railway with a mail sorter while James organises countless volunteers to help his father find a wedding ring that was lost 40 years ago. In order to give a voice to as many people as possible, the Man Lab crew organises pirate radio station, Man Lab Radio.
| 13 | 5 | Rory Barker | Tom Whitter | 25 April 2013 |
Sidekick Rory Barker is sent to try and run a whelk stall, a monster is made for Skegness, the team make a table football table with two players, so it is a penalty shootout. There is also a device to warn you if your tea gets cold.

== International ==
James May's Man Lab was broadcast on BBC America in the U.S., where it is periodically rebroadcast. It has also been broadcast in Australia on SBS One. However, SBS stopped showing series three after just two episodes in June 2013. In New Zealand it used to air on TV3 for first 2 series. From series 3 it will now air on Prime.

== Home media ==
Series One was released on DVD by Acorn Media UK on 7 November 2011. Series Two was released on 8 October 2012.
