= The Algorithm =

French musical project

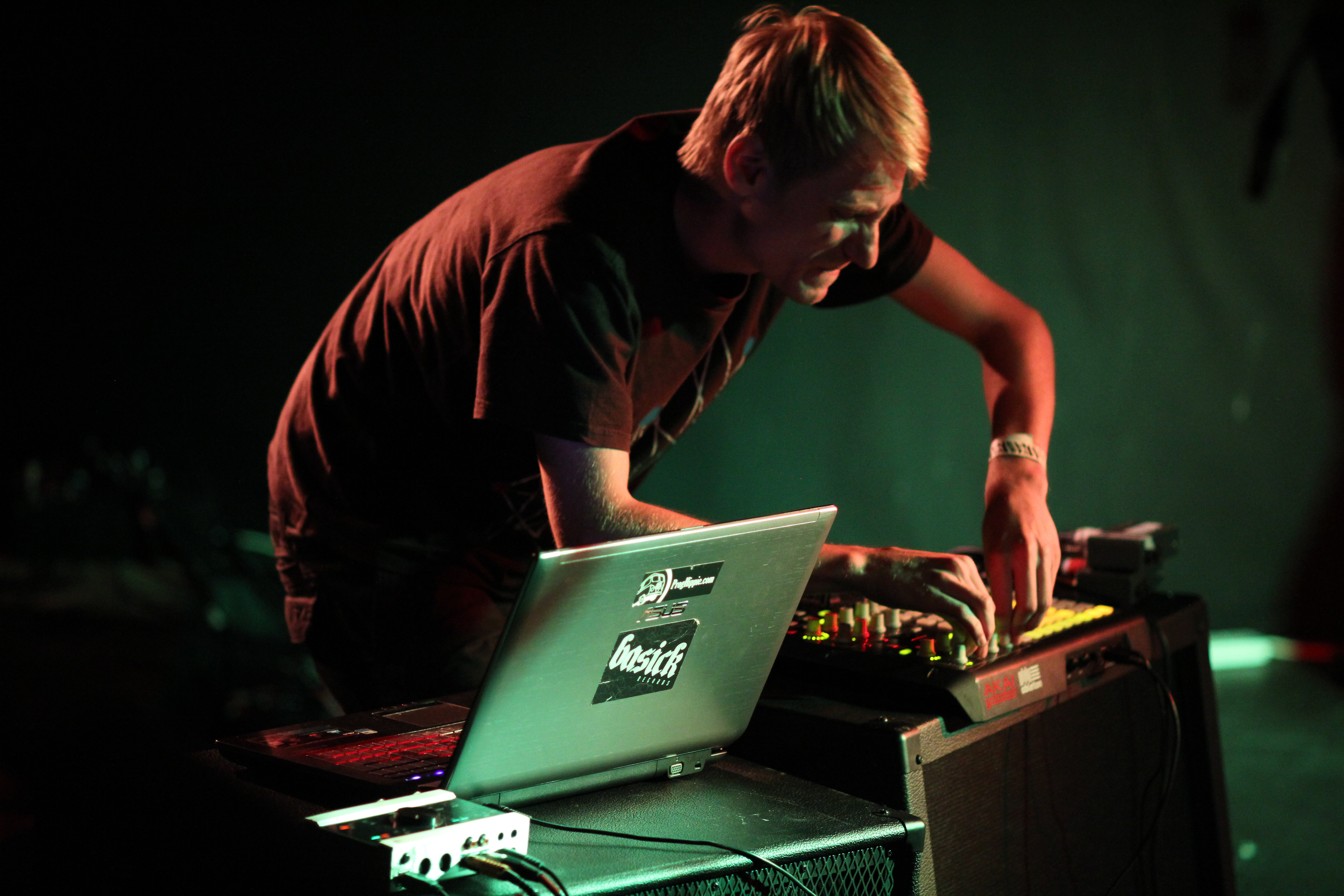
- The Algorithm live in Camden in 2012

Background information
- Origin: Perpignan, France
- Genres: Electronic; IDM; progressive metal
- Years active: 2009–present
- Labels: Basick; FiXT
- Members: Rémi Gallego

The Algorithm is the musical project of French musician Rémi Gallego (born 7 October 1989) from Perpignan. His style is characterised by an unusual combination of electronic music with progressive metal. Gallego chose the name The Algorithm to highlight the music's complex and electronic nature.

== History ==
=== Early years (2009–2010) ===
After the demise of his band Dying Breath, Rémi Gallego decided in 2009 to look for potential members for a band that focused on mathcore, which came as an inspiration from The Dillinger Escape Plan. After a futile search for new members, with the help of his guitar and a DAW, Gallego began to produce his own music.

In December 2009 and July 2010, he published the two demos The Doppler Effect and Critical Error, which were released through his own website for free download. Towards the end of 2010, he announced that he was working on a new EP named Identity (it was never completed). Also, he was preparing for his first live appearances.

=== First live shows (2011) ===
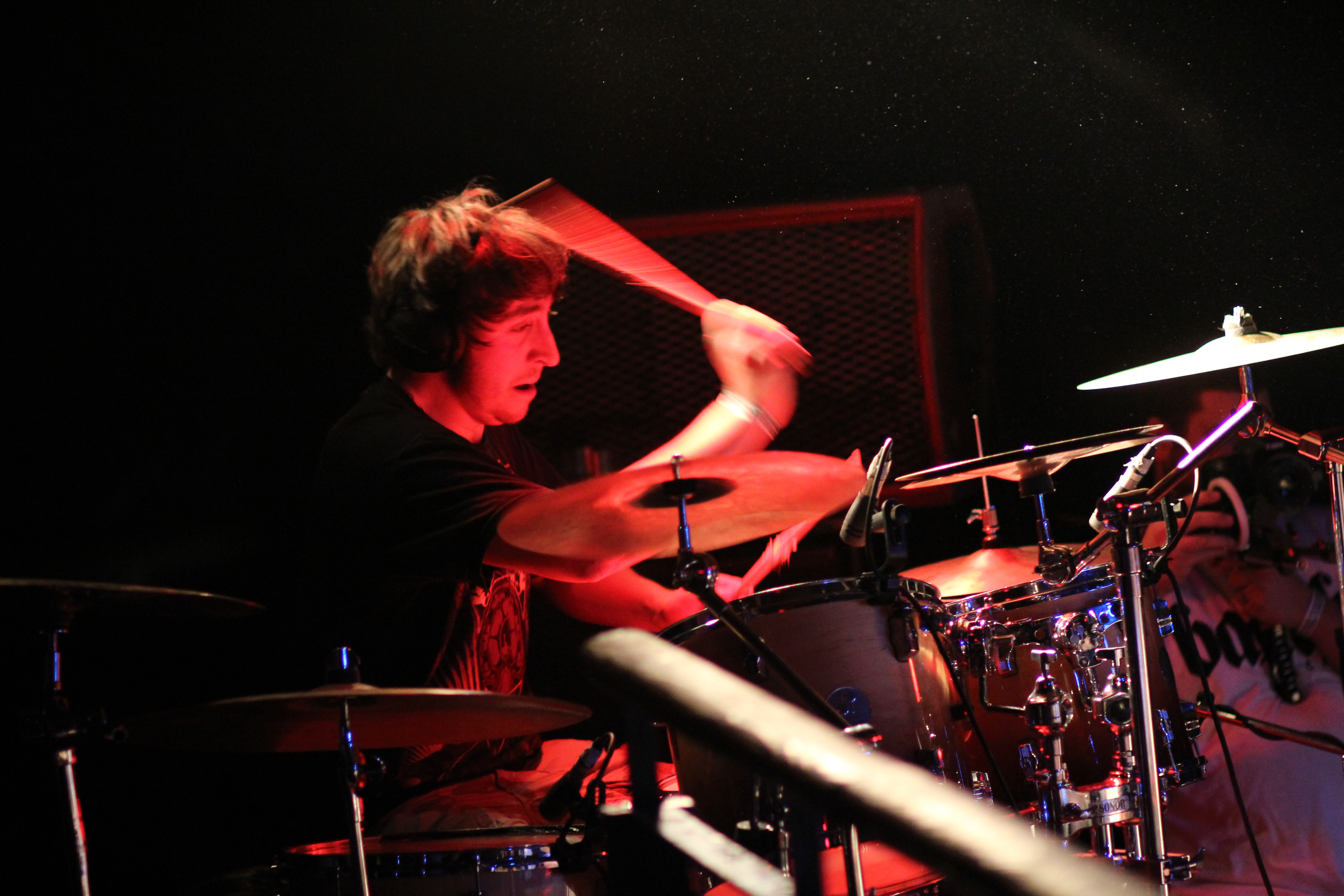
Mike Malyan live with The Algorithm in 2012

In August 2011, The Algorithm released his compilation called Method_ on which the songs from his two previous demos were compiled which were also for free download. An appearance followed in October 2011 at the Euroblast Festival in Cologne, where The Algorithm featured alongside bands such as Textures, TesseracT and Vildhjarta.

A month later Mike Malyan, drummer for the band Monuments, uploaded a drum cover of the song "Isometry" on YouTube. After seeing this, Gallego was convinced that it would be possible to play his songs on a real drum set and Malyan was presented as an accompaniment during live performances.

"Before he put his Isometry drum cover online, one year ago, I had no idea that someone could ever play my drum programmings with such dedication, musicality and tightness. He was really thrilled to play live with me and so we decided to make it happen. I can't be more happy to work with such a great friend/musician."

In the same month, The Algorithm signed a record deal with the British label Basick Records.

=== Signing to Basick Records and Polymorphic Code (2012–2013) ===
In January 2012, The Algorithm released the single "Trojans" via Basick Records, which was only available digitally. It was followed by appearances in festivals such as Djentival in Karlsruhe, Germany, as well as on the UK Tech-Metal Fest held in Alton, United Kingdom, where he joined the release in addition to including Uneven Structure and Chimp Spanner appearances. On 19 November 2012, the debut album Polymorphic Code was released through Basick Records, which included seven previously unreleased songs as well as the song "Trojans".

In January 2013, The Algorithm played alongside Enter Shikari and Cancer Bats at a concert in Paris. In April 2013, The Algorithm played their first live shows in the UK with a new live member, guitarist Max Michel. On 17 June 2013, The Algorithm was decorated on a Metal Hammer Golden Gods Awards as the best underground artist of that year, decided by the votes of Metal Hammer readers. From September–October 2013, The Algorithm toured mainland Europe on the French Connection Tour with Uneven Structure and Weaksaw. However, Mike Malyan was not able to perform on this tour; Boris Le Gal of NeonFly filled in for him instead. The live line-up also performed on a UK tour with Hacktivist from November to December 2013.

=== Octopus4 and video games (2013–2015) ===
In December 2013, the band played a show in Paris with Uneven Structure, Kadinja and Cycles. A week afterwards, it was announced that Max Michel would no longer be performing with Rémi as he had been accepted into the Berklee College of Music and could no longer tour regularly.

The Algorithm's second album, Octopus4, was released on 2 June 2014. Along with the release of the album, a crowd funding campaign was launched for a video game named RogueStar: Pirates vs. Privateers which features music composed by Rémi. In 2015, the video game Hacknet was released, and features music composed by Rémi.

=== Brute Force, Compiler Optimization Techniques and Data Renaissance (2016–present) ===
The third album, Brute Force, was released on 1 April 2016 through the label FiXT. In 2017, an extension for Hacknet named Hacknet Labyrinths was released, and features more music composed by Rémi. The same year, Rémi released an EP titled "直線移動" under a new alias, Boucle Infinie. In 2018, The Algorithm released his fourth studio album, Compiler Optimization Techniques. In 2022, the project's fifth studio album, Data Renaissance, was published.

== Musical style ==
The Algorithm melds several types of electronic and electronic dance music with progressive metal (including djent and mathcore). For live performances Rémi Gallego uses an Akai APC40, a MIDI controller produced by the company Akai Professional, co-developed with the German company Ableton, connected to a laptop running Ableton Live. In addition, a distorted female voice can be heard on almost all the releases, provided by Florent Latorre, a friend of Gallego's.

== Members ==
- Rémi Gallego – electronics, guitars, bass (2009–present)

Touring members

- Mike Malyan – drums (2012–2014)
- Jean Ferry – drums, electronic drums (2013–present)
- Max Michel – guitars (2013)

== Discography ==
=== Studio albums ===
- Polymorphic Code (2012)
- Octopus4 (2014)
- Brute Force (2016)
- Compiler Optimization Techniques (2018)
- Data Renaissance (2022)
- Recursive Infinity (2025)

=== Compilations ===
- Method_ (2011)

=== EPs ===
- Identity (2010)
- Brute Force: Overclock (2016)
- Brute Force: Source Code (2017)

=== Singles ===
- "Trojans" (2012)
- "Synthesizer" (2014)
- "Terminal" (2014)
- "Neotokyo" (2015)
- "Floating Point" (2016)
- "Pointers" (2016)
- "Collapse" (2018)
- "People from the Dark Hill" (2020)
- "Among the Wolves" (2021)
- "Protocols" (2021)
- "Interrupt Handler" (2021)
- "Segmentation Fault" (2021)
- "Run Away" (2021)
- "Decompilation" (2021)
- "Readonly" (2021)
- "Cryptographic Memory" (2021)
- "Object Resurrection" (2022)
- "Cosmic Rays and Flipped Bits" (2022)
- "Latent Noise" (2023)

=== Demos ===
- The Doppler Effect (2009)
- Critical Error (2010)
