= Filthy Empire =

Studio album by Heaven's Basement
- Released: 4 February 2013
- Recorded: Foxy Studios, Woodland Hills, CA
- Genre: Hard rock
- Length: 45:19
- Label: Red Bull
- Producer: John Feldmann

Singles from Filthy Empire
- 1. "Fire, Fire" Released: 27 September 2012; 2. "I Am Electric" Released: 4 February 2013

US version cover

Filthy Empire is the only studio album by British rock band Heaven's Basement. The album, which was released on 4 February 2013 after initially being scheduled for a January release, was produced by the American musician and producer John Feldmann. Filthy Empire was released on record label Red Bull Records, with whom the band signed in late 2011.

== Track listing ==
No.	Title	Writer(s)	Length
1.	"Welcome Home"	Aaron Buchanan, Sid Glover, Rob Ellershaw, Chris Rivers, Martin Johnson	3:17
2.	"Fire, Fire"	Buchanan, Glover, Ellershaw, Rivers, John Feldmann, Nick Long	4:15
3.	"Nothing Left to Lose"	Buchanan, Glover, Ellershaw, Rivers, Feldmann, David Jones	3:42
4.	"Lights Out in London"	Buchanan, Glover, Ellershaw, Rivers, Feldmann, Johnson	3:20
5.	"I Am Electric"	Buchanan, Glover, Ellershaw, Rivers, Feldmann, Jones	2:58
6.	"The Long Goodbye"	Glover, Rivers, Bob Marlette, Jones, Richard Evans	3:43
7.	"Heartbreaking Son of a Bitch"	Buchanan, Glover, Ellershaw, Rivers, Feldmann	3:00
8.	"Be Somebody"	Buchanan, Glover, Ellershaw, Rivers, Marlette, Jones	3:42
9.	"Can't Let Go"	Glover, Rivers, Jones, Evans	3:58
10.	"The Price We Pay"	Buchanan, Glover, Ellershaw, Rivers, Feldmann	5:24
11.	"Jump Back"	Buchanan, Glover, Ellershaw, Rivers, Jones, Patrick Stump	3:09
12.	"Executioner's Day"	Glover, Rivers, Jones, Evans	4:51
Total length:			45:19

== Personnel ==
Heaven's Basement

- Aaron Buchanan — lead vocals
- Sid Glover — guitars, backing vocals
- Rob Ellershaw — bass guitar
- Chris Rivers — drums

Additional musicians

- John Feldmann — piano on "Fire, Fire" and "The Price We Pay"
- Cameron Stone — cello on "The Price We Pay"

Production

- John Feldmann — production, mixing
- Brandon Paddock — mixing, first engineer
- Pete Beukelman — second engineer

Other

- James Minchin III — photography

== Use in video games ==
Song	Game	Ref
"I Am Electric"	Need for Speed Most Wanted, Rock Band 4	
"Fire, Fire"	NHL 14	
