= First Signs of Frost =

First Signs Of Frost
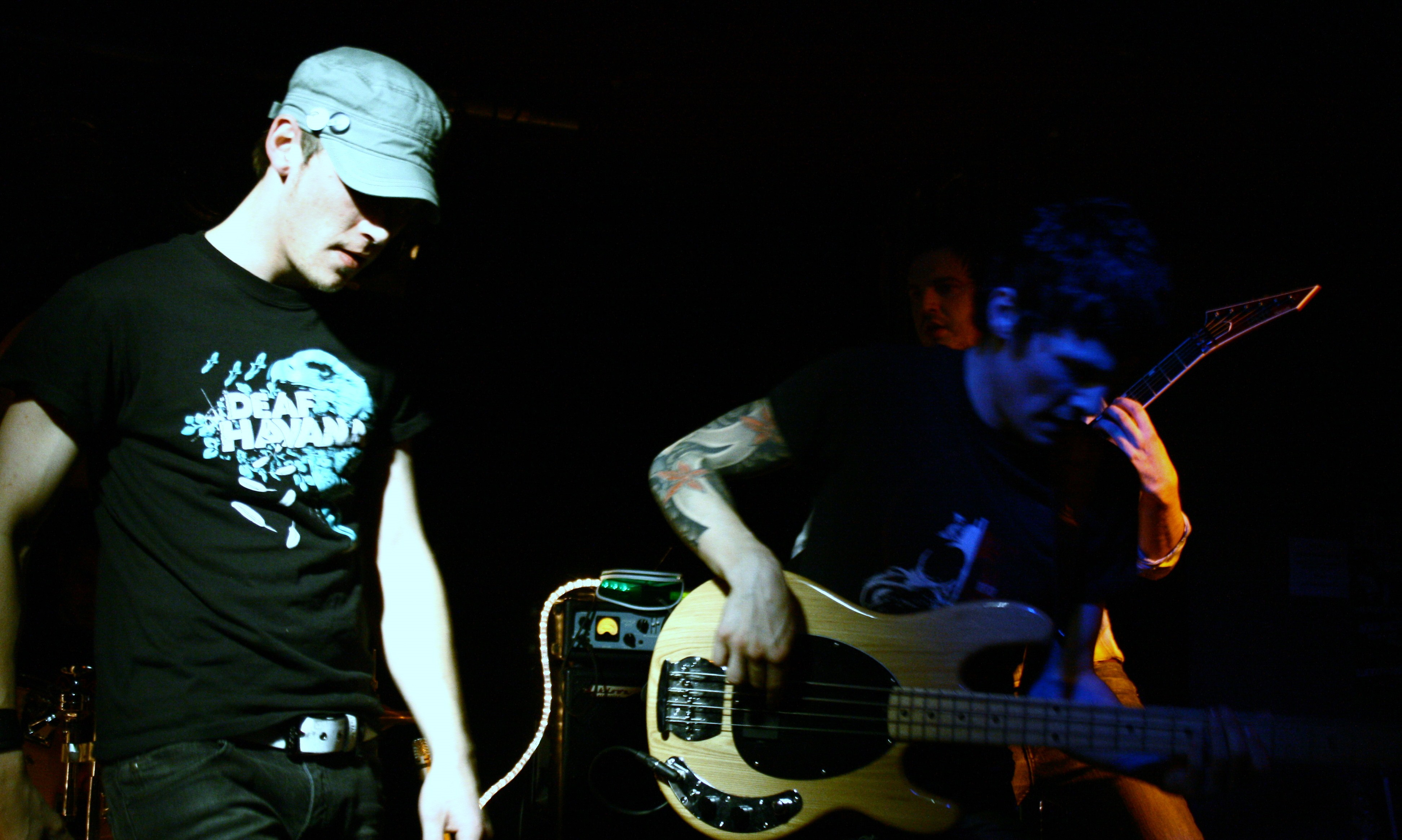
- First Signs of Frost at the Islington Academy, London in 2008

Background information
- Also known as: FSOF
- Origin: South East, London, England
- Genres: Post-hardcore, progressive rock, alternative rock, ambient
- Years active: 2004–present
- Labels: Alaskan Records; Basick Records; Zestone Records; Smalltown Records
- Spinoffs: TesseracT
- Members: Ronan Villiers; Owen Hughes-Holland; Adam Mason; Alex Harford
- Past members: Daniel Tompkins; Simon Poulton; William Gates; Dan Oehlman; Andy C Saxton; Daniel Lawrence

First Signs of Frost is an English post-hardcore/tech rock band from South East London. Forming in July 2004, the four-piece originally conformed by songwriter / guitarist and vocalist Owen Hughes-Holland along with guitarist Adam Mason, bassist Dan Oehlman and drummer William Gates. After embarking on numerous tours the band made a significant impact on the UK's underground rock scene.

They have shared the stage with Senses Fail, LostProphets, Sikth, Architects, Enter Shikari, You Me at Six, The Blackout and No Use for a Name.

== Biography ==
=== Beginnings, "In Our Final Chapter" and "The Lost Cause" EP's (2004–2007) ===
In 2004 they released independently their first EP titled "In Our Final Chapter" and received press coverage in publications such as Metal Hammer, Rock Sound, Big Cheese and Salvo magazines.

In 2007 they released "The Lost Cause" on 26 September through Zestone Records (Japan). They toured the UK to promote the release.

=== Tompkins' arrival and full-length recording (2007–2009) ===
In 2007 the band started writing material for their full-length debut titled Atlantic. Daniel Tompkins joins the band shortly after their UK tour with Exit Ten. They worked in the album production with band's friend Acle Kahney, Who had previously produced the Myspace demo of the song "Through The Exterior". The band also announced that three songs from the previous EP were in the main album. The songs were "The Saviour", "Expert in Trickery" and "Day of the Collapse". The band explained why they put previous material in their first full length in an interview with Altsounds. Bassist Simon Poulton stated:

"We were a little uncomfortable at first about using slightly older material, and I think if we'd done the album as a 4 piece, we wouldn't have used them. Having Dan join the band really revived those songs though, the arrangements have been bettered. We can now obviously do the songs justice with Dan's voice, they now sound the way we wanted them to sound before, and we definitely want more people to hear them!"

The band also released a split EP with The Casino Brawl and Elias Last Day via Smalltown Records. The EP featured two tracks from each band. FSOF song's were "Through The Exterior" and "Sing Sing Aint My Style". The split was well received, as FSOF was reviewed as the most original and promising of the three bands.

=== Departure of Tompkins from Atlantic (2009–present) ===
On 18 July 2009 the band announced on their Myspace's official blog that vocalist Daniel Tompkins will leave the band. However they also stated that they were still friends and that they wished him "the absolute best for the future". Later it would be stated in an interview that Tompkins would leave the band due to other commitments.

Atlantic was released worldwide on 25 November 2009, and received positive reviews from magazines and sites such as Metal Hammer and Kerrang!.

On 11 December 2009, FSOF announced to their fans the existence of an exclusive Mp3 track available to download for free on the website MusicGlue.com. The track was a b-side from Atlantic; a re-recorded version of "Finding the Bomb".

After a six-year hiatus First Signs Of Frost recruited new additions to their line up, consisting of frontman Daniel Lawrence (ex Kenai & All Forgotten), bassist Andy C Saxton (ex Cry For Silence) and drummer Alex Harford. In early 2017 the band signed with the British metal label Basick Records, releasing their first single "Look Alive Sunshine" on 26 June 2017, taken from their forthcoming comeback EP The Shape Of Things To Come for worldwide release on 11 August 2017 through Basick Records.

In 2018, songwriter & guitarist Owen Hughes-Holland began writing for the bands 2nd full-length album. In early 2020 when the pandemic hit, the recording of the album was put on hold. In the wake of COVID-19 the band went through some line-up changes, including the introduction of new frontman Ronan Villiers. Recording took place throughout 2021, and in early 2022 Owen began mixing the album. FSOF completed album no.2 'Anthropocene' in May 2022 and it would be set for release on 2 September 2022, this time through Alaskan Records. Leading up to the release of 'Anthropocene', the band would release their first single off the album 'Loss' on 26 June 2022, with subsequent singles 'Relics' and 'Viking Blood' to follow.

== Musical style and influences ==
FSOF has been tagged in such a variety of musical styles as post-hardcore, progressive rock, alternative metal and ambient music among other genres. The band's sound has been also compared with Sikth and Funeral For a Friend early stuff with a little more technicality and creativity, managing to produce a balanced mix between technical riffs and catchy melodies.

They have stated that everyone in the band has such wide-ranging musical tastes, that it lends itself to an interesting songwriting process, and the principal reason of FSOF being tagged as a 'technical' band, is because the constant use of time changes in their songs.

== Band members ==
=== Current ===
- Ronan Villiers – Vocals (2021–present)
- Owen Hughes-Holland – Guitar/Vocals (2004–present)
- Adam Mason – Guitar (2004–present)
- Alex Harford – Drums (2015–present)

=== Former ===
- Daniel Tompkins – Vocals (2007–2009)
- Simon Poulton – Bass (2005–2009)
- Dan Oehlman – Bass (2004–2005)
- William Gates – Drums (2004–2015)
- Andy C Saxton – Bass (2014–2021)
- Daniel Lawrence – Vocals (2015–2020)

== Discography ==
- In Our Final Chapter EP (2004)
- The Lost Cause EP (2007)
- Split EP with The Casino Brawl and Elias Last Day (2008)
- Atlantic (2009)
- The Shape Of Things To Come EP (2017)
- Anthropocene (2022)
