= Octopus4 =

Studio album by the Algorithm
- Released: 2 June 2014
- Recorded: 2014
- Length: 54:56
- Label: Basick
- Producer: The Algorithm

The Algorithm chronology
Polymorphic Code (2012)	Octopus4 (2014)	Brute Force (2016)

Singles from Octopus4
- 1. "Synthesizer" Released: 5 May 2014

Professional ratings
Review scores
Source	Rating
Metal Hammer	3.5/5 stars
Metal Storm	8/10
The Monolith	90%

Octopus4 is the second studio album by French musical project the Algorithm. It was released on 2 June 2014 through Basick Records.

== Track listing ==
Octopus4 track listing
No.	Title	Writer(s)	Length
1.	"Autorun"		5:41
2.	"Discovery"		3:52
3.	"_MOS"	Mike Malyan	1:57
4.	"Will_Smith"		4:21
5.	"ピタゴラスPythagoras"		5:39
6.	"Synthesizer"		4:25
7.	"Damage Points"		5:27
8.	"Void"		3:32
9.	"Loading"		3:41
10.	"Un Dernier Combat"		4:14
11.	"Recovery Fail!"		2:39
12.	"Octopus4"		9:27
Total length:			54:56

Notes

- All track titles are stylised in lowercase, except for "ピタゴラスPythagoras", which is stylised in all caps.
- "Autorun" is stylised as "autoRun".
- "Synthesizer" is stylised as "synthesiz3r".

== Personnel ==
- Rémi Gallego – synthesizer, sequencer, guitar, programming, production, vocals (tracks 6 and 10)
- Mike Malyan – drums
- Tim Reynolds – mastering
