= The Treatment (band) =

English hard rock band

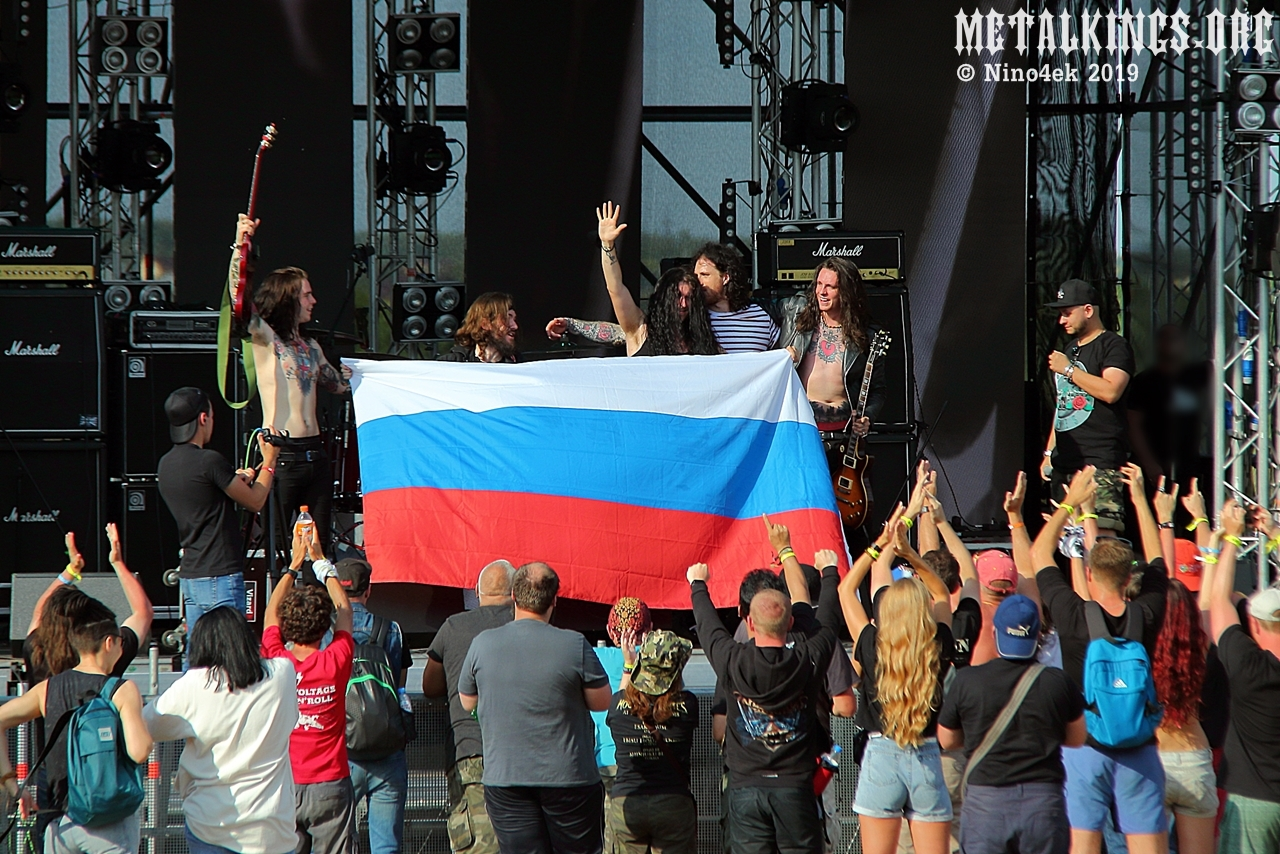
- The Treatment at Big Gun fest 2019 (Russia)

Background information
- Origin: Cambridge, Cambridgeshire, England
- Genres: Hard rock
- Years active: 2008–present
- Label: Spinefarm
- Members: Tagore Grey; Dhani Mansworth; Tao Grey; Tom Rampton; Bailey Richardson
- Past members: Ben Brookland; Jake Pattinson; Matt Jones; Fabian Dammers; Mitchel Emms; Rick "Swoggle" Newman; Andy Milburn

The Treatment are an English hard rock band, which formed in Cambridge, England, in 2008. Previously, the band members had played together under the name God Sacks Man.

== History ==
In 2011 the band played at Sonisphere Festival on the Jägermeister stage. Later in 2011, a UK tour arranged by the Powerage record label featured The Treatment, alongside New Device, Lethargy and Million Dollar Reload.

After the Medication For The Nation Tour in the United Kingdom in December 2011 the band went on tour in support of Alice Cooper, Steel Panther and Thin Lizzy.

The first album ,This Might Hurt, was released on 19 September on Universal Music Group and Spinefarm Records.

Later, on 21 April 2012, The Treatment and Spinefarm released an EP with covers of songs by bands including Electric Light Orchestra and Slade. The disc was titled Then and Again.

The Treatment played on the Pepsi Max Stage at Download Festival in Castle Donington, UK on 9 June 2012.

In 2012 the band went on tour with Kiss and Mötley Crüe in their The Tour. In 2013 they played at Ozzfest in Japan and four dates with Slash in the UK. They also supported Status Quo on their Frantic Four reunion tour with Quo's original line-up in 2013.

On 3 February 2014, their second full-length album, entitled Running with the Dogs, was released.

Alongside Reckless Love, The Treatment released a mini-compilation on 12" orange vinyl to mark Record Store Day in 2014. The compilation was released by Spinefarm Records and includes two tracks from each band.

On 29 March 2015, the band announced that their frontman Matt Jones would be leaving The Treatment. On 7 May 2015, the band announced that Mitchel Emms and Tao Grey had joined as the band's new vocalist and guitarist respectively. The band had played secret shows with this line-up; on 25 July 2015, they played at the Steelhouse Festival alongside Y&T, Nazareth and UFO. In September 2015, the band were special guests on tour in the UK with W.A.S.P. On 7 October 2015, the group was signed by the Italian label Frontiers Records.

In September 2017, vocalist Mitchel Emms parted ways with the band. In December 2017, Tom Rampton, formerly of Freeway Mad, was announced as the new vocalist.

In January 2018, they released the single "Bite Back" in anticipation for their upcoming album Power Crazy, which was announced for release on 22 March, followed by a tour to support it.

In early March 2018, the label released a video for the song "Hang Them High", and later, they released another music video for the song "Luck of the Draw."

On 13 March 2019, they released their fourth album, Power Crazy.

On 9 April 2021, they released their fifth album, Waiting For Good Luck.

On 10 May 2024, the released their sixth album, Wake Up The Neighbourhood.

== Members ==
=== Current members ===
- Tagore Grey – guitar/backing vocals (2008–present)
- Dhani Mansworth – drums (2008–present)
- Tao Grey – guitar/backing vocals (2015–present)
- Tom Rampton – vocals (2017–present)
- Bailey Richardson – bass (2025-present)

=== Former members ===
- Ben Brookland – guitar (2008–2013)
- Matt Jones – vocals (2008–2015)
- Rick "Swoggle" Newman – bass (2008–2020)
- Jake Pattinson – guitar (2013–2014)
- Fabian "Dee" Dammers – guitar (2014–2015)
- Mitchel Emms – vocals (2015–2017)
- Andy Milburn – bass (2020–2024)

== Discography ==
=== Studio albums ===
- This Might Hurt (2011)
- Running With the Dogs (2014)
- Generation Me (2016)
- Power Crazy (2019)
- Waiting for Good Luck (2021)
- Wake Up the Neighbourhood (2024)

=== EPs ===
- Then and Again (Covers) (2012)
- Reckless Love, The Treatment – Die Hard / Angel Falling (12", Ora) (2014)

=== Music videos / singles ===
- "Drink, Fuck, Fight" (2011)
- "Shake the Mountain" (2011)
- "Departed" (2011)
- "The Doctor" (2012)
- "Nothing to Lose But Our Minds" (2012)
- "I Bleed Rock & Roll" (2013)
- "Emergency" (2014)
- "Running With the Dogs" (2014)
- "The Outlaw" (2014)
- "Let It Begin" (2016)
- "The Devil" (2016)
- "Generation Me" (2016)
- "Bloodsucker" (2016)
- "Backseat Heartbeat" (2016)
- "Hang Them High" (2019)
- "Luck of the Draw" (2019)
- "Let's Get Dirty" (2019)
- "Bite Back" (2019)
