= Deleted scene (disambiguation) =

A deleted scene is a scene removed from or replaced by another scene in the final version of a film or television series.

It may also refer to:

- Deleted Scenes (album), a 2012 album by Blueprint
- Deleted Scenes (band), an American indie rock band
- "Deleted Scenes", episode 58 of Aqua Teen Hunger Force
- Deleted Scenes, a 2006 mini-album by Days in December
