= The Hidden Words (album) =

Studio album by Fellsilent
- Released: 25 August 2008
- Genre: Progressive metal, mathcore, djent
- Label: Basick Records

Fellsilent chronology
The Double 'A' (2006)	The Hidden Words (2008)

Singles from The Hidden Words
- 1. "Drowned In My Enemy"; 2. "Immerse"

The Hidden Words is the first and only studio album by British experimental band Fellsilent. Released on 25 August 2008 by Basick Records. The album was then released in North America on 3 March 2009 on the Sumerian Records label.

Karl Schubach of Misery Signals called the album one of the best of 2008.

== Track listing ==
No.	Title	Length
1.	"Erase/Begin"	5:38
2.	"Double Negative"	6:45
3.	"Drowned in My Enemy"	4:54
4.	"Oblique"	6:47
5.	"Void"	1:09
6.	"Mindless Self"	5:15
7.	"Immerse"	4:16
8.	"Emerge"	2:13
9.	"Silence Is the Loudest Cry for Help"	4:21
10.	"The Sleeper Must Awake"	1:01
11.	"Age of Deception"	5:43
Total length:		48:02

== Personnel ==
Fell Silent

- Neema Askari – vocals
- John Browne – guitar
- Max Robinson – bass
- Christopher 'Noddy' Mansbridge – drums
- Acle Kahney – guitar
- Joe Garrett – vocals
