= Data Renaissance =

Studio album by the Algorithm
- Released: 3 June 2022
- Length: 39:00
- Label: FiXT
- Producer: The Algorithm

The Algorithm chronology
Compiler Optimization Techniques (2018)	Data Renaissance (2022)

Singles from Data Renaissance
- 1. "Interrupt Handler" Released: 28 May 2021; 2. "Segmentation Fault" Released: 8 July 2021; 3. "Decompilation" Released: 15 September 2021; 4. "Readonly" Released: 8 October 2021; 5. "Cryptographic Memory" Released: 3 December 2021; 6. "Object Resurrection" Released: 21 January 2022

Data Renaissance is the fifth studio album by French musical project the Algorithm. It was released on 3 June 2022 through FiXT.

== Critical reception ==
Professional ratings
Review scores
Source	Rating
Blabbermouth.net	7.5/10
Metal Storm	8/10

Dom Lawson from Blabbermouth.net gave the album 7.5 out of 10 and said: "There are certainly moments of electronic purity here, but The Algorithm's intuitive subversive streak is always lurking in the background. Even the jittery, insistent beats of "Multithreading" are gradually undermined by thick, viscous bass ooze and flashes of ghostly humanity. An album full of intelligence and verve, Data Renaissance is eccentric, enthralling and more than heavy enough to hit the spot." Into the Void gave the album positive review, saying: "Data Renaissance creates some creatively searing aggressive moments that cascade into gorgeous stabs of synth and digital bliss. Rémi Gallego is about as talented as they come when it comes to multi-genre forces in the electronic, synthwave, and metal genres. If the artist brings more atmospherically heavy and inventive works like this to the table, the electro-metal scene is in for a real treat."

== Track listing ==
Data Renaissance track listing
No.	Title	Length
1.	"Segmentation Fault"	4:35
2.	"Interrupt Handler"	3:42
3.	"Decompilation"	3:28
4.	"Readonly"	3:41
5.	"Cryptographic Memory"	4:26
6.	"Object Resurrection"	3:54
7.	"Multithreading"	3:13
8.	"Oracle Machine"	3:07
9.	"Data Renaissance"	4:46
10.	"Inline Assembly"	4:03
Total length:		39:00

== Personnel ==
- Rémi Gallego – synthesizer, sequencer, guitar, programming, production, mixing
- Brian Skeel – mastering
- Adrien Bousson – artwork
- Katerina "Ninja Jo" Belikova – layout
