= Between the Screams =

Between The Screams
- Origin: Southend-on-Sea, Essex, England
- Genres: Progressive Metal; Ambient; Post-Hardcore
- Years active: 2006–2011
- Label: Basick Records
- Members: Adam Ralph; Daniel Waterhouse; Chris Froment; Chris Horton
- Past members: Mark Ravinet; Terry Blake; Paul Reeves

Between The Screams were a British progressive metal band from Southend-on-Sea, UK. Considered one of the bands (along with Devils sold his soul, *Shels & Rinoa) at the forefront of the relatively short-lived ambient metal scene in the late 2000s that combined elements of metalcore, electronics, ambient Shoegazing and post metal.

== History ==
Between The Screams (often shortened to BTS) were formed in February 2006 by Daniel Waterhouse (guitars), Adam Wolf (vocals) and Mark Ravinet (drums). Upon replying to an advert, Terry Blake was brought in on bass and Chris Froment (electronics). The band name was taken from the lyrics of a Cult of Luna song, originally one of the band's biggest influences.

The band recorded two new tracks with Mark Williams (Devil sold his soul, Enter Shikari, Sikth, Biffy Clyro) at Criterion/Battery Studios in February 2007 and after playing many shows during the summer of that year, the band recorded another two tracks, again with Mark Williams. Three of the four recorded songs became the foundations of the debut EP Embryo.

Although in circulation beforehand, Embryo was officially self-released in May 2008 and received much acclaim, with Chrysalis receiving airtime on BBC Radio One, Time (The Undoing) featuring on the covermount CD of Metal Hammer and the band receiving the highly coveted Rocksound KBY Band of the Month award.

In 2008, drummer Mark Ravinet left the band to pursue further education. Chris Horton filled the position and took over from May 2008.

In the summer of 2008, Between The Screams began to write their debut album with new drummer Horton before spending two weeks in the Welsh countryside recording with producer Joe Gibb (Funeral for a friend Brigade) at Mighty Atom Studios and named the album Our Last Days On Earth. After receiving positive feedback for the Embryo EP, Basick Records agreed to release the album in spring 2009 and signed the band to a further two-album deal.

Our Last Days On Earth was released on 5 October 2009, and featured eleven tracks, with a total duration of 45:08. The album displayed an advancement of sound, incorporating a heavier, more aggressive influence, while still maintaining their signature progressive ambient soundscapes. The album received high praise from popular music press, including 4/5 from Kerrang, 8/10 from Rocksound and 9/10 from Metalhammer as well as the track 'Blood red dawn' receiving airtime on the Radio 1 rockshow.

Online press were also kind to the band, with soundshock stating "Our Last Days On Earth is the soundtrack to the heavens collapsing and the fires beneath the earth raging. 8/10" Whilst Subbaculture stated that OLDOE is "Some of the most beautiful metal of the year". The album made many end of year 'best of' lists and spawned one single, the title track 'Our last days on earth'. The single proved a surprise hit on alternative TV Channel's 'Scuzz TV' and Kerrang.

On 21 May 2011, Between the Screams announced that with immediate effect the band was go on indefinite hiatus and have remained largely inactive since.

== Band members ==
- Adam Ralph — Vocals/Guitar
- Daniel Waterhouse — Guitar
- Chris Froment — Electronics/Bass
- Chris Horton — Drums

Former Members

- Mark Ravinet — Drums
- Terry Blake — Bass
- Paul Reeves - Guitar

== Discography ==
- Embryo EP (Self-released 2008)
- Our Last Days On Earth Album (Basick Records 2009)
- Our Last Days On Earth Single (Basick Records 2010)
