= Brute Force (album) =

Studio album by the Algorithm
- Released: 1 April 2016
- Genre: Hardcore; ambient; trance; breakbeat; IDM; progressive metal
- Length: 46:01
- Label: FiXT
- Producer: The Algorithm

The Algorithm chronology
Octopus4 (2014)	Brute Force (2016)	Compiler Optimization Techniques (2018)

Singles from Brute Force
- 1. "Floating Point" Released: 30 January 2016; 2. "Pointers" Released: 9 March 2016

Brute Force is the third studio album by French musical project the Algorithm. The album was released on 1 April 2016 through FiXT. It is the project's first studio release with the label.

== Promotion and release ==
Promotional video single "Floating Point" was announced through Metal Hammer on 30 January 2016 with a remix released on the project's official blog the following month. On 9 March 2016, Metal Underground premiered the music video for "Pointers" along with the track listing for the album. Commenting on the release, Gallego stated the track was "one of my favorite [songs] so far". The same day, the album was made available for pre-order on the project's website with various bundle options. Some bundles included a MIDI version of the album on a floppy disk. On 30 March 2016, two days before official release, the full album was streamed with Metal Hammer accompanied by Gallego's track-by-track analysis of the album.

== Critical reception ==
Professional ratings
Review scores
Source	Rating
It Djents	9/10
Metal Hammer	4/5 stars
The Monolith	Positive
The Musical Melting Pot	91%
New Noise	4/5 stars

Upon release, the album gained generally positive reviews from metal publications. Paulo Bodriguez of The Monolith gave the album a positive review, stating "The Algorithm...have clearly found their own unique style and sound", while referring to the floppy disk pre-orders as a "cheeky sense of self-awareness". Nicholas Senior of New Noise, when observing the progression of The Algorithm's sound, stated "we hear the band hitting a sweet spot down the middle, with an album that is equally comfortable executing really interesting electronic passages and hard synths as it is hitting the blast beats and post-Meshuggah riffs hard."

== Track listing ==
All music is composed by Rémi Gallego, except "Deadlock" by Rémi Gallego and Igorrr

Brute Force track listing
No.	Title	Length
1.	"Boot"	3:27
2.	"Floating Point"	5:07
3.	"Pointers"	4:39
4.	"Brute Force"	5:21
5.	"Userspace"	6:15
6.	"Shellcode"	4:24
7.	"Hex"	5:03
8.	"Deadlock" (featuring Igorrr)	2:33
9.	"Rootkit"	4:47
10.	"Trojans (Hard Mode)"	4:21
Total length:		46:01

Deluxe edition bonus tracks
No.	Title	Length
11.	"Idle"	3:09
12.	"Overclock"	3:47
13.	"Double Data Rate Synchronous Dynamic Random Access Memory"	5:48
14.	"Floating Point" (Drumcorps remix)	3:21
15.	"Runtime"	3:43
16.	"Source Code"	7:02
17.	"Dynamic Recompilation"	8:48
18.	"Userspace" (Volkor X remix)	7:55
19.	"Floating Point" (Vaporwave remix)	7:10
20.	"Rootkit" (Chiptune remix)	4:48
Total length:		101:52

Notes

- All track titles are stylised in lowercase.

== Personnel ==
The Algorithm

- Rémi Gallego – synthesizer, sequencer, guitar, mixing, programming, production

Additional musicians

- Igorrr – guest instrumentation on track 8, "Deadlock"

Additional personnel

- Erica Schaub – artwork, layout
