= Cry for Silence =

British metal band

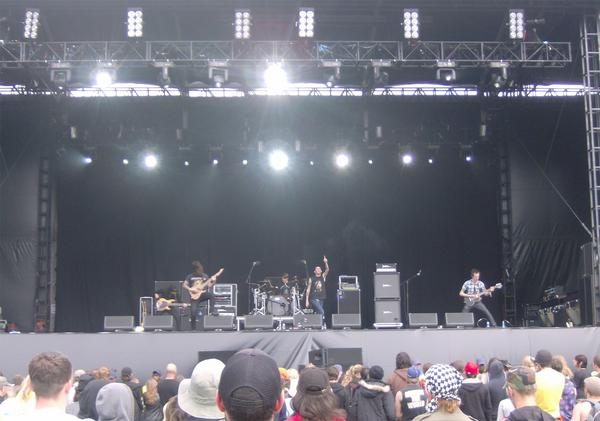
- Cry for Silence in 2008

Background information
- Also known as: CFS
- Origin: Watford, England
- Genres: Metalcore; progressive metal
- Years active: 1999–2008
- Labels: Mighty Atom; Visible Noise
- Members: Alessandro Venturella; Steve Sears; Andy C. Saxton; Ali Gordon; Adam Pettit

Cry for Silence were a British heavy metal band. They influenced and toured with a number of other bands.

== History ==
Cry for Silence was formed in 1999 by guitarist Alessandro Venturella. He later recruited Steve Sears (guitar), Ali Gordon (drums), Andy C. Saxton (bass) and Adam Pettit (vocals).

In their 8 years together, Cry For Silence have been cited as an influence by Enter Shikari. They have toured with bands including The Black Dahlia Murder, The Bled, Caliban, The Distillers, From Autumn to Ashes, Funeral For A Friend, The Haunted, The Hope Conspiracy, Hopesfall, My Chemical Romance, Nora, Poison the Well, Shai Hulud, Sepultura, Sikth, and Strung Out.

Cry For Silence have played festivals including Give it a Name 2007 at Earls Court and Download Festival 2008. They also performed live radio sessions for BBC Radio One.

After releasing two EPs, Cry For Silence released their debut album in 2008, titled The Glorious Dead, with album artwork by Dan Mumford.

Following the breakup of Cry For Silence, Alessandro Venturella went on to tour duties with LostProphets, Architects, Mastodon who made the introductions to Slipknot, Andy C. Saxton joined First Signs of Frost and Steve Sears went on to form Gold Key and production work at Monolith Studios in North London.

== Discography ==
- Through the Precious Words (2001)
- The Longest Day (Mighty Atom Records, 2004)
- The Glorious Dead (Visible Noise, 2008)
