= Imperium Vorago =

Studio album by Chimp Spanner
- Released: January 28, 2005
- Genre: Progressive metal, djent, ambient
- Length: 55:10
- Producer: Paul Ortiz

Chimp Spanner chronology
Imperium Vorago (2005)	At the Dream's Edge (2009)

Imperium Vorago is the debut album by progressive metal project Chimp Spanner. It was released in January 2005 independently. When Chimp Spanner signed to Basick Records, the album became available on the iTunes Store.

== Track listing ==
All music is composed by Chimp Spanner.

No.	Title	Length
1.	"Clarity in Chaos"	6:32
2.	"Spirals"	4:43
3.	"Broken"	2:24
4.	"Smiles & Cries"	6:03
5.	"Hour 11"	1:41
6.	"The Last Day"	6:31
7.	"D.O.A"	1:33
8.	"Jacob's Ladder"	5:57
9.	"Threering" (Contains the hidden track "Core" starting at 16:07)	19:41
Total length:		55:10

== Personnel ==
Chimp Spanner

- Paul Ortiz - guitars, bass, keyboards, drum programming, and production
