= The Arusha Accord =

English metal band

- Origin: Reading, Berkshire, England
- Genres: Mathcore; progressive metal
- Years active: 2005–present
- Labels: Arusha Records; Basick
- Members: Paul Green; James Clayton; Sam Machin; Luke Williams; Mark Vincent
- Past members: Alex Green; Tom Hollings
- Website: www.arushaaccord.com

The Arusha Accord are a mathcore-technical metal band from Reading, Berkshire who took their name from an agreement aimed at ending the Rwandan civil war.

== Band history ==
The Arusha Accord are a rhythm-section fuelled, progressive math metal band from Reading, UK. They utilise technical guitar work as well as cyclical, progressive, Tool-inspired melodies. The band have received comparisons to Sikth and Dillinger Escape Plan, and they state their influences to be Dillinger Escape Plan, Sikth, Tool, Converge and Meshuggah. They are well known for the fact that they are one of the only mathcore bands, along with Sikth (only partially) to utilise slap bass, and Luke Williams uses this style heavily.

The Arusha Accord's debut album The Echo Verses was released in the autumn of 2009 and received a 4 out of 5Ks-rated review from Kerrang, reviewer Ray Holroyd enthusing: "Any band that can create a debut album this flawless is destined for success."

According to a more recent press statement dated February 2011 the band are writing their second album, which will be released in the near future. Also, they plan to release a two-disc Collector's Edition of their debut album The Echo Verses, paired with their EP Nightmares of the Ocean, which includes various bonus features such as desktops, tablature for the whole The Echo Verses album, new artwork, and the video for their song "Dead To Me". This collector's pack was released internationally on 12 April 2011 through Basick Records. Basick Records, for a limited time, offered copies of the collector's pack signed by each member of the band, which have since sold out.

After 7 years on Hiatus, The Arusha Accord began tracking the first of four EPs Juracan in late 2016. After a turbulent 2 years that saw vocalist Alex Green leave the band and Guitarist Tom Hollings move on to focus on his song writing/production career, Arusha finally released Juracan in late September 2018 to rave reviews.

Since Juracan's release The Arusha Accord have recruited guitarist Sam Machin of band Arcaeon and have set about completing the second EP of the four EP series

As well as being a member of The Arusha Accord, Paul Green is also the current vocalist for Devil Sold His Soul.

== Band members ==
- Paul Green – vocals (2005–present)
- James Clayton – guitar (2005–present)
- Sam Machin - guitar (2018-present)
- Luke Williams – bass guitar (2005–present)
- Mark Vincent – drums (2005–present)

== Former members ==
- Alex Green – vocals (2007–2018)
- Tom Hollings – guitar (2005–2018)

== Discography ==
=== Albums ===
- The Echo Verses (2009), A Wolf at Your Door

=== EPs ===
- Nightmares of the Ocean (2008), Basick Records
- The Arusha Accord/A Textbook Tragedy split EP, A Wolf at Your Door
- Juracán (2018), Arusha Records

=== Compilations ===
- The Echo Verses/Nightmares of the Ocean (2011), Basick Records
