= Compiler Optimization Techniques (album) =

Studio album by the Algorithm
- Released: 1 November 2018
- Length: 47:25
- Label: FiXT
- Producer: The Algorithm

The Algorithm chronology
Brute Force (2016)	Compiler Optimization Techniques (2018)	Data Renaissance (2022)

Professional ratings
Review scores
Source	Rating
Distorted Sound	7/10
Metal Hammer	4/5 stars
Rock Sins	7/10
Sputnikmusic	3.5/5

Compiler Optimization Techniques is the fourth studio album by French musical project the Algorithm. It was released on 1 November 2018 through FiXT.

== Track listing ==
Compiler Optimization Techniques track listing
No.	Title	Length
1.	"Cluster"	11:43
2.	"Fragmentation"	7:29
3.	"Superscalar"	7:29
4.	"Binary Space"	6:43
5.	"Sentinel Node"	9:24
6.	"Fragmentation" (Extra Terra remix)	4:35
Total length:		47:25

== Personnel ==
- Rémi Gallego — synthesizer, sequencer, guitar, programming, production, mixing, mastering
- Adrien Bousson — artwork, layout
