= Love Fungus =

Background information
- Origin: Birmingham, Bearwood, West Midlands
- Genres: Indie rock punk, metal
- Years active: 1991, 2011–2015
- Label: The Sub-Exotic Recording Company
- Members: Dennis Day; Ian Kelly; Mat McIvor; Mark Rabone; Ben Upton
- Website: lovefungus.com (non-current)

Love Fungus was an English indie rock band from Birmingham, that featured on series two of the BBC TV series, James May's Man Lab. As part of the programme, which first aired in the UK on 1 November 2011, the band reunited after 20 years apart, auditioning and winning the chance to perform at the High Voltage Festival in July 2011.

== History ==
The band had originally formed in 1991, but broke up later that year. They reunited to audition for James May's Man Lab after Ian Kelly had sent an email putting their band forward. After playing at the High Voltage Festival, the band recorded their first EP, Blind Devotion. In 2012 they released their debut single "Vampire Movies".

A full live recording exists from around 2013 at The Baseline Music Venue in Dudley. This has never been released, but samples can be found on YouTube. (Recording is owned by Basement Studios - since closed, but is archived)

In December 2015, Ian Kelly announced through the band's Facebook page that Love Fungus had ceased activities indefinitely.

== Discography ==
=== Blind Devotion (EP) ===
Blind Devotion is the debut EP from Love Fungus and was released on 7 October 2011.

All tracks are written by Ian Kelly, except where noted.

No.	Title	Writer(s)	Length
1.	"Sub Exotic"		4:05
2.	"Devotion"		3:12
3.	"Eight"	Lyrics by Ian Kelly. Music by Ian Kelly, Mark Rabone, Dennis Day	4:54
4.	"Blu Lite"	Lyrics by Ian Kelly. Music by Ian Kelly, Mark Rabone, Dennis Day	3:57
Total length:			16:08

==== Personnel ====
Love Fungus

- Mat McIvor – vocals
- Ian Kelly – drums
- Mark Rabone – guitar
- Ben Upton – bass guitar
- Dennis Day – guitar

Additional musicians

- Ross Taylor – percussion (2, 4)

Production

- Love Funguss – producer
- Jon Dewsbury – recording engineering
- Recorded at Rich Bitch Studios, Birmingham, England
- some tracks were remixed by sound engineer James Callaghan (A Doctor Who Audio sound design freelancer for Big Finish Productions) at The Basement Studios, Dudley - (some keyboards were added by Ian and James) - this version remains unreleased

Artwork

- Matt McIvor (hardworkwiththekids.blogspot.com)

=== Vampire Movies (Single) ===
"Vampire Movies" is the debut single from Love Fungus and was released on 9 January 2012.

No.	Title	Length
1.	"Vampire Movies"	3:51
