= Heaven's Basement =

British rock band (2008–2017)

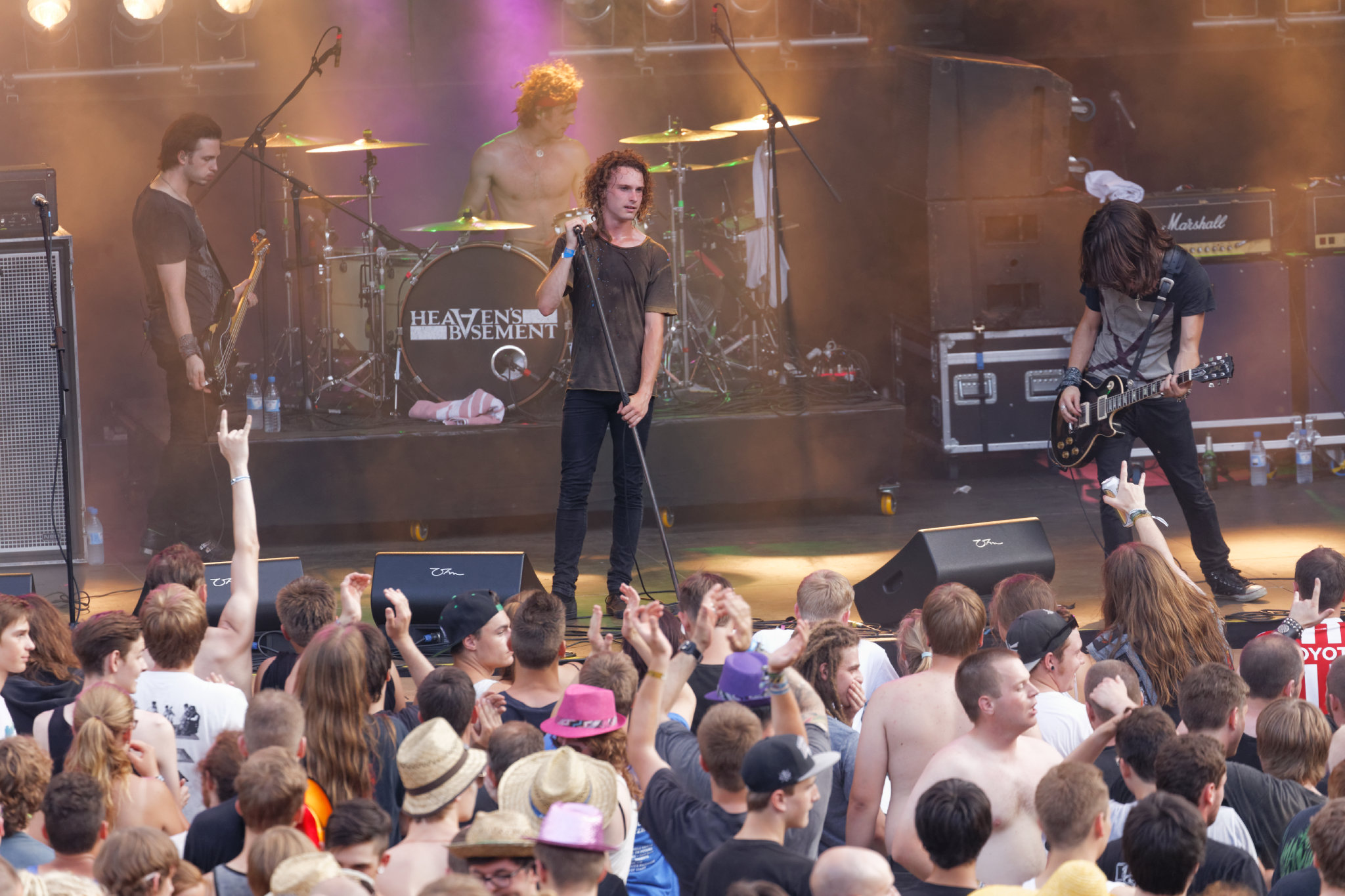
- Heaven's Basement performing in 2013

Background information
- Origin: Manchester, England
- Genres: Hard rock; alternative rock
- Years active: 2008–2017, 2026–present
- Label: Red Bull
- Members: Chris Rivers; Sid Glover; Rob Ellershaw; Aaron Buchanan
- Past members: David Radahd-Jones (Jonny Rocker); Rob Randell; Richie Hevanz
- Website: heavensbasement.com

Heaven's Basement is an English rock band formed in 2008 and signed with Red Bull Records. Band members included Aaron Buchanan (vocals), Sid Glover (guitar, vocals), Rob Ellershaw (bass, backing vocals), and Chris Rivers (drums). The band split up in January 2017.

The band began hinting at their return in November 2026.

Their debut album, Filthy Empire, was released in 2013. They released their first single, "Fire, Fire", in September 2012, leading up to their album release. The single peaked at number 11 on the Mainstream Rock chart.

== History ==
=== Heaven's Basement EP (2008–2010) ===
Heaven's Basement was renowned for their heavy touring schedules and extremely energetic live performances. The band first performed live in Kettering at The Sawyers venue in April 2008 after a few months of being locked away in a studio writing songs. Since that point, Heaven's Basement toured Europe with the likes of Papa Roach, Buckcherry, Bon Jovi, Theory of a Deadman, Shinedown, Blind Melon, Hardcore Superstar, Tesla, Madina Lake, D-A-D, Thunder, Black Stone Cherry, Halestorm, D'espairsRay and Black Veil Brides as well as playing at many festivals such as Bloodstock Open Air, Hard Rock Hell, Graspop Metal Meeting, Download Festival, and Sonisphere among others. Heaven's Basement also worked with the American record producer Bob Marlette in the studio.

They were invited to open for Bon Jovi on the Manchester show of their tour at the City of Manchester Stadium, playing to an audience of around 50,000 people. Later that summer, the band released their own self-titled E.P. which was recorded at Sandhills studio in Liverpool. The rest of the summer was spent with the band playing small clubs and pubs all across the UK, building their fanbase. In November 2008 Heaven's Basement were invited to be the main support for Thunder on their UK tour, which also helped to rapidly build their fanbase. They ended 2008 with a UK headline tour, with support from fellow upcoming band Wired Desire. After impressing Thunder on their UK tour, Heaven's Basement started 2009 with the main support slot to Thunder on their European tour in Feb/March which included dates in Belgium, Holland, Germany, and Switzerland.

In early September 2009, Heaven's Basement announced on their MySpace page that their bassist, Rob Randell, had left the band for personal reasons. As the band had many gigs lined up for the month after this, Jonny Rocker took on bass duties for some of the shows. The band held auditions for a new bass player, and it was announced late in October that Rob Ellershaw was to take over. Rob had supported Heaven's Basement in his previous band Whitefire for a number of shows in 2008.

In October 2009, Heaven's Basement appeared live alongside Papa Roach and Madina Lake during Papa Roach's Metamorphosis tour of the United Kingdom. According to both Metal Hammer and Kerrang! magazines, they were at this point one of the best live bands in Britain. They returned to the UK for a full headlining tour in December 2009, with Dear Superstar and New Device supporting. They also appeared as co-headliners with the Eureka Machines at Rockit '09, Rugby, alongside local act Audio Narcotix.

During 2009, Bob Marlette expressed his interest in working with the band to produce some songs. He travelled to the UK for two sessions with Heaven's Basement at Monow Valley studios. Two of the songs recorded were added to the band's EP ("Can't Let Go" and "Misunderstood" replacing "Saint Routine" and "Fear of Getting Off"). Another song from the sessions, "The Long Goodbye" was released in early 2010 via the band's MySpace site, but others remained unreleased.

In February 2010, just two weeks before the UK headline tour, the band announced that lead singer Richie Hevanz was leaving the band, citing the reason that the demands of constant touring had overwhelmed him. Just as Hevanz left the band, they were also confirmed as main support to Theory of a Deadman across Europe throughout March and April. Heaven's Basement called upon friend Johnny Fallen from UK based band "The Fallen" to sing temporarily whilst they searched for a new frontman. Heaven's Basement appeared at a number of high-profile festivals during the summer of 2010, including Sonisphere at Knebworth park on the Bohemia stage (headlined by Rammstein) and the Swedish Sonisphere pre-party with The Cult. They also appeared at the first Getaway Festival in Sweden alongside Deftones and Airbourne.

Guitarist Jonny Rocker broke his finger whilst playing football in July 2010 a few hours before the band were due to go stage opening for Papa Roach. The band decided to carry on and play the show as a four-piece, and the rest of the summer headline and festival dates were also performed as a four-piece.

Heaven's Basement released a statement in August 2010 informing everyone that they would be spending the rest of 2010 mainly off the road, working on brand new material whilst seeking a new full-time singer.

=== Unbreakable EP (2011) ===
On Thursday 17 February 2011, Heaven's Basement released a statement saying that Aaron Buchanan (ex-Oceans Upon Us) would be taking over on lead vocals, and that rhythm guitarist and long-time band member Jonny Rocker would be leaving to pursue a more behind-the-scenes career in music. Heaven's Basement stated that they would, for the foreseeable future, be a four-piece. On the same day, a new song 'Unbreakable' was released which was also revealed to be the title of the band's second EP. The Unbreakable EP was released on 5 May at the band's first show of their UK headline tour, and was later released on iTunes. In May through to June, the band toured extensively across the UK.

Following a highly successful UK tour, Heaven's Basement were offered an acoustic slot at Download Festival and Sonisphere Festival, as well as a main-stage slot at High Voltage Festival in London, alongside the likes of Judas Priest, Dream Theater and Slash. They prepared for these acoustic dates with a warm-up show in The World's End, Camden. Heaven's Basement released a statement in association with these shows, saying that they weren't going to become just a 'soft' acoustic band (as many bands at the time were choosing to perform acoustic sets), and that fans could expect an equally energetic performance from their acoustic shows as they could from their full electric gigs.

In October 2011, Heaven's Basement travelled to Los Angeles for a month to record new material. In November, they announced that they'd signed a deal with Red Bull Records. "Paper Plague", a new song recorded during this recording session, was released as a free download, and three new shows were announced for December 2011.

=== Filthy Empire, Buchanan's departure and split (2012–2017) ===
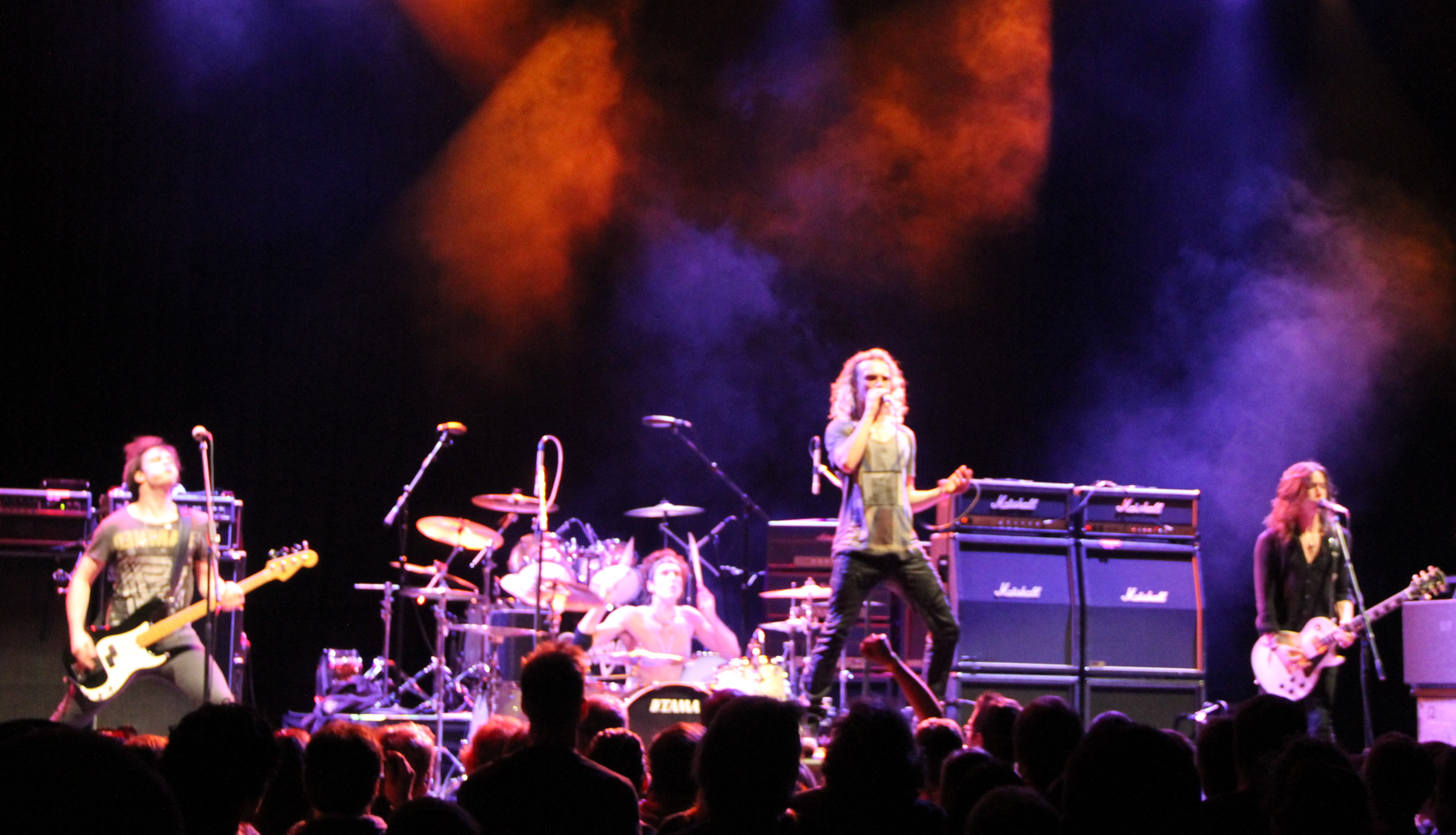
Heaven's Basement in 2012

In September 2012, the band released a single from their debut album Filthy Empire entitled "Fire, Fire". John Feldmann produced, co-wrote on, and mixed the album. The band promoted this with a month-long European tour with Halestorm and the band's first ever appearance in America playing alongside The Darkness at Club Nokia in Los Angeles on 24 October 2012. They then went on to do a UK and European tour with Seether in November 2012 and finished off 2012 with a show at the Camden Barfly, London on 18 December 2012. The band returned to perform at Carolina Rebellion and Rock on The Range through the spring and summer of 2013. They had some show dates with Buckcherry, before returning to the UK for their headline run in July. The band then went on tour in the US and Canada with The Pretty Reckless and Louna. They closed out the year in the UK and Europe with Black Veil Brides. They were subsequently scheduled to perform throughout Australia as part of the 2014 Soundwave Festival.

During 2015, the band began recording their new album, stating that the new record would be released sometime later in the year.

Filthy Empire, the band's debut album, was released on 4 February 2013 to excellent reviews, including KKKK from Kerrang, and entered the BBC Rock Album Chart at No. 9 in the UK. This album included the singles "Fire, Fire", "Nothing Left to Lose" and "I Am Electric", each of which was accompanied by a music video. "Fire, Fire" peaked at No. 11 on the US Mainstream Rock chart (Week of 10 May 2013).

On 21 October 2015, it was announced via social media that Aaron Buchanan had parted ways with the band, with the following statement: "We've all had a fantastic few years touring the world with Filthy Empire but we simply feel that our time together has run its course." Buchanan went on to form Aaron Buchanan & The Cult Classics in April 2016, with debut album "The Man With Stars On His Knees" (mastered at Abbey Road Studios) released on 26 May 2017 to critical acclaim.

In 2016, former band member Richie Hevanz became frontman of Fragile Things, following a short stint in a band called Endless Mile. In July 2021, he became the frontman for Misery's Smile.

In January 2017, Heaven's Basement announced via social media that they had decided to split up. Former band members Sid Glover and Rob Ellershaw went on to found a new band called The Cruel Knives, together with Tom Harris and Al Junior.

== Band members ==
- Chris Rivers — drums (2008–2017)
- Sid Glover — lead guitar, vocals (2008–2017)
- Rob 'Bones' Ellershaw — bass guitar, backing vocals (2009–2017)
- David Radahd-Jones (Jonny Rocker) — rhythm guitar, backing vocals (2008–2011)
- Rob Randell — bass guitar (2008–2009)
- Richie Hevanz — lead vocals (2008–2010)
- Aaron Buchanan — lead vocals (2011–2015)

Touring musicians

- Johnny Fallen — lead vocals (2010)
- James Sinclair — lead vocals (2010)
- Danny Worsnop – lead vocals (2015)
- Tom Harris — lead vocals (2016–2017)

== Discography ==
- Heaven's Basement (EP) (2008)
- Unbreakable (EP) (2011)
- Filthy Empire (2013)

== In popular culture ==
The song "I Am Electric" is featured on the soundtrack of the video game Need for Speed: Most Wanted and is a playable track in Rock Band 4.

The song "Fire, Fire" is featured on the soundtrack of NHL 14.
