= Andy C. Saxton =

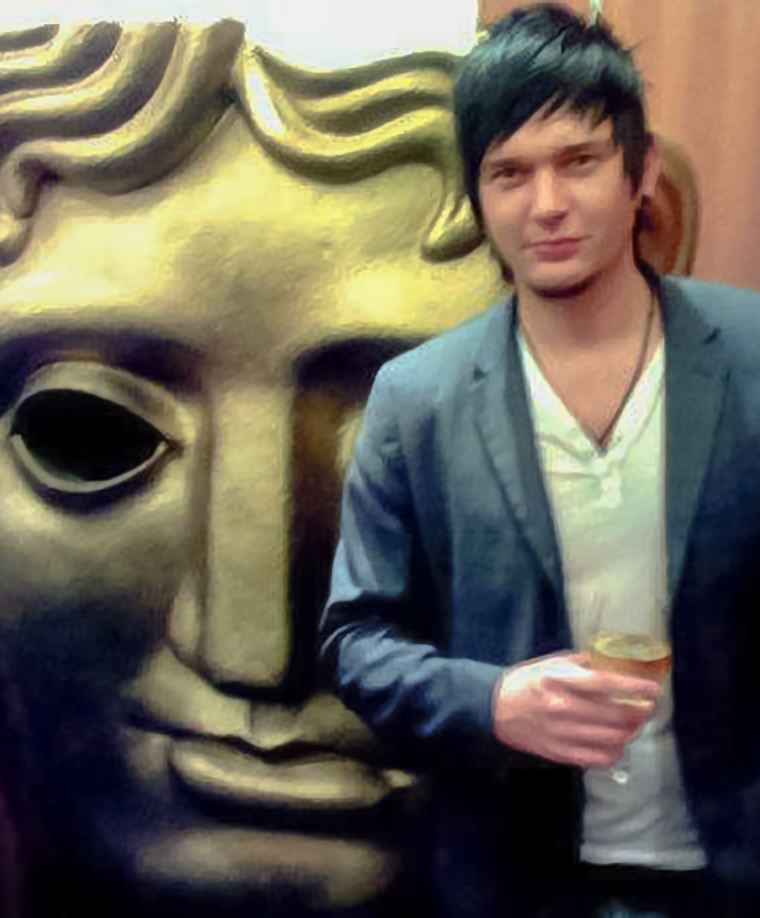
- Saxton at a BAFTA Screening in London

Background information
- Origin: Watford, England
- Genres: Rock, progressive metal, acoustic, solo bass
- Occupation(s): Musician, producer, film composer
- Years active: 1996–present
- Website: andysaxton.com

Andy C. Saxton is a musician, producer and film composer from Watford, England. He has worked alongside many famous bands and musicians including Bon Jovi, Sepultura, Alexisonfire, Jimmy Eat World. Saxton was also the bassist for the Progressive Metal band Cry For Silence for eight years with the new Slipknot bassist Alessandro Venturella. Saxton has played on albums with Ryan Richards from Funeral For a Friend and Charlie Simpson from Busted/Fightstar

== Influences ==
According to an interview published in Bass Guitar magazine, Saxton's main influences are Alain Caron, Jaco Pastorius, Ryan Martinie, Stuart Zender, Les Claypool and Flea.

== Discography ==
- Through The Precious Words (2001) with Cry For Silence
- The Longest Day Mighty Atom Records (2004) with Cry For Silence
- The Glorious Dead Visible Noise (2008) with Cry For Silence
- Takin Over Plastic Head Distribution (2009) with New Device
- The Shape Of Things To Come Basick Records (2017) with First Signs Of Frost
