= Fellsilent =

British heavy metal band

- Origin: Milton Keynes, England
- Genres: Progressive metal, djent, avant-garde metal, groove metal, mathcore
- Years active: 2003–2010
- Labels: Basick, Sumerian
- Spinoffs: TesseracT, Monuments
- Past members: Neema Askari; John Browne; Max Robinson; Christopher 'Noddy' Mansbridge; Acle Kahney; Joe Garrett
- Website: www.myspace.com/fellsilent

Fellsilent (also typeset as FELLSILENT) were a British heavy metal band from Milton Keynes. They possessed a technical, polyrhythmic style, similar to bands such as Meshuggah and Sikth. The band also focused on some melodic elements. They released their debut album The Hidden Words in 2008 which gained immediate popularity among metal fans. Touring with other British bands such as Enter Shikari and Exit Ten helped them to gain further popularity. In 2008, Fellsilent signed to US record label Sumerian Records.

== Influences ==
Fellsilent listed many influences including bands such as Meshuggah, Sikth, Textures and the early heavy metal band Led Zeppelin. This mix of new and old was an important tool used by the band in pioneering the genre.

== Reception ==
Kerrang! Magazine noted the band highly saying: "The six piece stir up some seriously brutal technical bludgeoning riffs interspersed with stratospheric choruses, an exciting and invigorating soundtrack to break things to".

== Break-up ==
On 30 April 2009 Fellsilent announced that they were looking for a new guitarist to fill the position of ex band member, Acle Kahney.

Garrett, Robinson and Mansbridge also left the band. Despite their Myspace stating these members were still within the band, Browne and Neema confirmed they had left, but were focusing on finishing their second album before announcing the departure of these members publicly.

On 5 April 2010 the band announced on their Myspace page that "after 7 years of putting everything we had into this band, we've simply all moved on and are taking our musical creativity into new and exciting projects".

Kahney and Browne expanded their then-side projects TesseracT and Monuments; Joe starting working as a songwriter and music producer. He played guitar and co-wrote Zayn Malik's debut single "PILLOWTALK" and currently has his own studio in London. Noddy currently drums for Heart of a Coward, and also acted as a stand-in for Enter Shikari when they toured the United States, as Rob Rolfe was not able to get a US Visa until 2011.

== Reunion rumours ==
A campaign was started on Facebook when the band explicitly stated on their official Facebook page that if 3000 of the band's fans wanted them to reunite they would do so. After several months and failing to reach the goal of 3000 fans, Joe Garrett posted on the band's Facebook stating that it was unanimously agreed that they would never play together as a band again.

== Former members ==
- Neema Askari – vocals (ex-Monuments) (2003–2010), He Knows (2019-2025), Zenarchist (2025)
- John Browne – guitar (Monuments, Flux Conduct) (2004–2010)
- Acle Kahney – guitar (Tesseract) (2003–2009)
- Max Robinson – bass (2003–2010)
- Christopher 'Noddy' Mansbridge – drums (Heart of a Coward) (2003–2010)
- Joe Garrett – vocals (2006–2010)

== Discography ==
- Fell Silent (2003)
- The Double 'A' (2005)
- The Hidden Words (2008)
