= Aaron Buchanan & The Cult Classics =

British rock band

- Origin: London, England, United Kingdom
- Genre: Rock
- Years active: 2016–present
- Label: Listenable
- Members: Aaron Buchanan; Laurie Buchanan; Tom McCarthy; Mart Trail; Paul White
- Past members: Kev Hickman; Chris Guyatt
- Website: www.wearecultclassics.net

Aaron Buchanan & The Cult Classics are a British rock band formed in 2016 by former Heaven's Basement (Red Bull Records) vocalist Aaron Buchanan and signed to Listenable Records. Band members include Aaron Buchanan (vocals), Laurie Buchanan (guitar and vocals), Tom McCarthy (guitar and vocals), Mart Trail (bass) and Paul White (drums) (formerly of industrial metal band The Defiled and symphonic metal band Season's End). The band cite 1990s grunge rock influences and came together for first rehearsals in June 2016 initially with Kev Hickman formally of RavenEye on drums, this was followed up with a full UK tour alongside InMe starting on 17 October 2016 through to 23 October. The band continued to tour through 2017 with appearances at Download Festival, a full UK tour alongside Life of Agony (Mina Caputo) and a European tour with Royal Republic in support of The Man With Stars on His Knees album. The band has also toured with the likes of Skid Row, Buckcherry and Skindred amongst many others.

== The Man With Stars on His Knees ==
After departing Heaven's Basement in late 2015, Buchanan went into the studio to record The Man With Stars on His Knees. Many of the demo's were put together by Buchanan during his time in Heaven's Basement. The album was produced by lifelong friend and producer James Curtis-Thomas at Plus 11 Studios. The Man With Stars on His Knees was predominantly written by Buchanan in the United Kingdom with many of the vocals and song structures put together at the Reddington family home in Chambers Flat, Brisbane, Australia. The album features Aaron Buchanan (Vocals/Drums/Guitar/Bass), James Curtis-Thomas (Drums), Laurie Buchanan (Guitars/Vocals) and Ryan Woods (Guitar/Bass) and was tracked at Plus 11 Recording Studio in Boreham. The album was then sent off to be mastered at Abbey Road Studios. The first single video, "All The Things You've Said And Done" was released on 12 October 2016 initially on Facebook, shortly after on YouTube and was released as a physical copy with a b/side "Fire in the Fields of Mayhem."

=== Critical response ===
"Think Soundgarden. Think Muse. Think power. And think of a band who can back up a big riff with an even bigger chorus." was a line used to describe The Man With Stars on His Knees by Team Rock. Hard Rock Hell posted "It's immediately obvious that Buchanan has seized the opportunity to strike free and plough a fresh creative furrow." Classic Rock gave a 7/10 review finishing with "Buchanan is back on his feet, and swinging from the heavens." Rob Halford of Judas Priest also commented on the band via Instagram on a photo of Aaron Buchanan and Halford together at the Hell-Bent For Leather exhibition in Parliament Tattoo, Finsbury Park, London in 2017 saying the band were "making waves."

=== Track listing ===
1. Show Me What You're Made Of
2. All The Things You've Said And Done
3. Dancin' Down Below
4. The Devil That Needs You
5. Journey Out of Here
6. The Man With Stars on His Knees
7. A God Is No Friend
8. Left Me For Dead
9. Mind of a Mute
10. Morals?

== Freddie Mercury tribute ==
Buchanan has often cited influence and appreciation of Freddie Mercury of Queen. On 5 September 2016, The Cult Classics Facebook page posted a video of Aaron Buchanan & Tom McCarthy in celebration of what would have been Mercury's 70th birthday, and a tribute to what would have been both 25 years since his death and 30 years since the Queen at Wembley gig of 1986. They performed acoustically a rendition of "Love of My Life" (from the 1975 album A Night at the Opera), a song performed regularly and internationally by Queen in their hey-day. The rendition was inspired by the Live at Wembley '86 performance of the song and achieved over 50,000 hits in just a matter of days to exceptional media response.

== Members ==
=== Current members ===
- Aaron Buchanan – Vocals (2016–present)
- Laurie Buchanan – Guitar, Backing Vocals (2016–present)
- Tom McCarthy – Guitar, Backing Vocals (2016–present)
- Mart Trail – Bass Guitar (2017–present)
- Paul White – Drums (2017–present)

=== Past members ===
- Chris Guyatt – Bass Guitar (2016-2017)
- Kev Hickman – Drums (2016-2017)
