= Deadly Circus Fire =

English progressive metal band

- Origin: London, England
- Genres: Progressive metal, rock, metal
- Years active: 2009–present
- Members: Save Addario; Paul P Igoe; Adam Grant; Mike Enort
- Website: www.deadlycircusfire.co.uk

Deadly Circus Fire is a four-piece English progressive metal band from London, England. Formed in early 2009, the group's line-up includes guitarist Save Addario, drummer Paul Igoe, vocalist Adam Grant, and bassist Mike Enort.

== History ==
After completing his music studies in Rome, Save Addario moved to London. Shortly after, he met Paul Igoe who had just moved from Ireland to continue his drumming education. They decided to form a band that would not be traditional and mainstream, yet be accessible and inspiring. So, they began searching for the bassist and lead vocalist of their unnamed collaboration.

The search for a bassist lasted almost a year. They struggled to find a bassist that would be both suitable and passionate for the music they played. Eventually, they found Mike Enort, who lived near Save's home in Italy. After Enort joined, the group began focusing on finding a vocalist, without initial success. Eventually, they noticed a Kerrang advertisement posted by Adam Grant. An audition was organised, and the band was not hopeful because of how bad the previous auditions had been. Grant, without a microphone, started to improvise over a guitar riff, and the band knew that they had finally found their vocalist.

In less than a year of their formation they had written many songs, five of which were recorded for their EP, Deadly Circus Fire, which then became the band's name. The EP itself was written, recorded, mixed, mastered, and illustrated in its entirety by the band.

The EP received favourable coverage and reviews across most media, with the UK's Prog Magazine, Sound on Sound magazine, TotalRock Radio "this is REALLY good stuff, clever pounding Prog Rock", Whotune Radio Australia " Awesome, such an original sound, great journey", Best Of Myspace "Proper chugga chugga scary prog metal with more angry energy than a weighted bag of kittens by a river in angry drunk's hand". Multiple tracks off The EP were played on TotalRock Radio, Whotune Radio Australia and Gateway FM.

Deadly Circus Fire performed at the Hammerfest on 17 March 2011 and at the Bloodstock Open Air Metal Festival on the Sophie Lancaster stage on 13 August 2011. Although the band was delayed by technical faults, they still performed with a display of showmanship and musical ability. Deadly Circus Fire toured alongside Skindred in 2013 and 2015.

== The King and The Bishop (2013) ==
The band unveiled through Metal Hammer (February 2012 issue) the title of their debut album, The King and the Bishop. a ten track album divided into two chapters. The album was recorded between September and November 2011 in London at MTR studios with Phil Kinman, who co-produced it alongside the band. It was mastered in New York at Sterling Sound by Ted Jensen. The King And The Bishop was scheduled to be released in March 2012, but for technical issues has been postponed to 2013 after being re-mastered at Wired Masters Studios in London by Andy Pearce and Matt Wortham.

On 1 June 2013, The King And The Bishop was worldwide digitally released through all the major on line outlet, including iTunes, Amazon, Spotify and many others. Following outstanding reviews, Deadly Circus Fire's debut album, has been also physically released with Metal Hammer 2013 August issue.

In November 2013, Deadly Circus Fire unveiled their second music video Her Epitaph just before embarking on the European Tour alongside Skindred and Japanese outfit Crossfaith. Deadly Circus Fire gained rave live reviews from their outstanding live performances leaving their fans braying for more. Metal Hammer have said "Deadly Circus Fire are one of the best band in prog metal right now.".

Track List:

Chapter One

1. "Through the Soil (i.Born ii.Damned iii.Requiem)"
2. "Her Epitaph (iv.The Return)"
3. "Nothing"
4. "Blackout"
5. "In the Kingdom of Flies"

Chapter Two

1. "The King and The Bishop"
2. "Black Mask"
3. "Threnody"
4. "Leviathan"
5. "The Light Within"

== The Hydra's Tailor (2015) ==
Deadly Circus Fire launched a Pledge campaign in April 2014 to raise funds for the recording of their second studio album. Following the success of the campaign, which raised over £10,000, the band signed a worldwide record deal with Musicarchy Media for the release of their album The Hydra's Tailor. It was released worldwide via Musicarchy Media on 16 June 2015. The album features 12 tracks:

1. "In Darkness We Trust"
2. "Animal"
3. "Where It Lies"
4. "Victim"
5. "Devil's Opera"
6. "Rise Again"
7. "Martyrs"
8. "House Of Plagues"
9. "Aeden"
10. "The Hydra's Tailor"
11. "Turning The Tide"
12. "Universe"

== "Shinigami Fall" (2017) ==
After Adam Grant's temporary departure in August 2016, Deadly Circus Fire kept performing their last few scheduled shows of the 2016, including Euroblast in Germany, as a three piece band. During the beginning of 2017 the band kept writing music until June 2017 when the band announced that David Pear had joined Deadly Circus Fire, and a new single "Shinigami Fall" was premiered. Deadly Circus Fire announced a Heavy Metal Truants fundraiser show (17 August) and a support slot with Uneven Structure and Voyager (17 October). The Heavy Metal Truants support three charities in equal measure – Nordoff Robbins Music Therapy, Childline/NSPCC and Teenage Cancer Trust.

Deadly Circus Fire appeared at the 10th anniversary of Hammerfest in Wales in March 2018.

== "Ghost" (2017) ==
The song featured temporary vocalist David Pear and follows "Shinigami Falls" which the band revealed in September.

== Discography ==
- Deadly Circus Fire EP - 2010
- "The King and the Bishop" (Single) - 2012
- "The Light Within" (Single) - 2013
- The King and the Bishop (Debut studio album) - 2013
- The King and the Bishop (Deluxe Edition) - 2013
- The Hydra's Tailor (Second studio album) - 2015
- "Shinigami Fall" (Single) - 2017
- "Ghost" (Single) - 2017
- "White Wash" (Single) - 2022 - The first record released since the return of Adam Grant
- "Bombs Away" (Single) - 2022
- Extinction (Third studio album) - 2022
- "Barbed Wire Halo" (Single) - 2024
