= Paul Ortiz (musician) =

British musician

- Also known as: Chimp Spanner
- Born: Paul Antonio Ortiz; 19 February 1984 (age 41)
- Origin: Essex, England
- Genres: Progressive metal, djent, ambient
- Occupation(s): Composer, producer, musician
- Instrument(s): Guitar, bass guitar, piano, synthesizer, drums
- Years active: 2004–present
- Labels: Basick Records

Paul Antonio Ortiz (born 19 February 1984) is an English multi-instrumentalist, best known for his work under the pseudonym, or solo project, of Chimp Spanner. He recorded, produced, mixed and mastered in his home studio, both the 2005 album Imperium Vorago and 2009's At The Dream's Edge. Ortiz has also composed for computer games, advertising, television and radio — and for clients ranging from Red Bull to Dolby Laboratories — and mixed and mastered albums for other musicians.

== Career ==
=== Chimp Spanner ===
Ortiz categorises the work under his Chimp Spanner moniker as an ambient/progressive metal project, combining heavy guitars with ambient textures, electronica and melodic elements, while also demonstrating his guitar virtuosity. Chimp Spanner is often labelled as djent or progressive metal. 2005 saw the release of his debut album Imperium Vorago, which as well as being self financed and produced, was also distributed by Ortiz himself, without the backing of a distribution company. Ortiz released his second album entitled At The Dream's Edge in December 2009. The album is available in a physical format and as a download.

On 5 March 2010, Ortiz's project Chimp Spanner signed a deal with Basick Records for the album At the Dream's Edge, which was officially released 10 April 2010.

With the signing to Basick Records, Ortiz began to perform live under the alias Chimp Spanner. The live Chimp Spanner line-up consists of himself, guitarist Jim Hughes, bassist Adam Swan (also of Monuments) and drummer Boris Le Gal.

In early 2012, Ortiz released his first EP under the Chimp Spanner name, All Roads Lead Here, which is focused around a three-movement piece called Möbius. The EP was originally scheduled to be released in May 2011, but was delayed for personal reasons.

In July/August 2012, Chimp Spanner embarked on their first tour of the United States, alongside Jeff Loomis, The Contortionist, and 7 Horns 7 Eyes. Ortiz enlisted Anup Sastry (Intervals, Skyharbor) and Gregory Macklin (Ordinance) to handle drum and guitar duties respectively, since he could not bring his regular live band to the US with him.

In November 2018, Ortiz announced that he is writing material for a new Chimp Spanner full-length.

=== Blessed Inertia ===
In October 2009, Ortiz unveiled a new project under the name Blessed Inertia. Classed as technical progressive metal on its Myspace page, Blessed Inertia is a more straightforward, guitar-driven project. Ortiz stated that Blessed Inertia would be his live band, and although currently instrumental, would incorporate a vocalist at a later date. The project is currently on hiatus due to Ortiz's commitments to Chimp Spanner. Alongside Ortiz, Blessed Inertia currently only consists of one other member, Chimp Spanner's live guitarist Jim Hughes. Both Ortiz and Hughes are cited as playing guitar, bass and drums.

=== Monuments ===
Ortiz was a live guitarist for Monuments before they secured Olly Steele (formerly of Cyclamen) as their full time second guitarist.

=== ZETA ===
ZETA is an 80's progressive synth pop band, consisting of Paul Ortiz, Daniel Tompkins (Tesseract, White Moth Black Butterfly, formerly Skyharbor) and Katie Jackson. All songs are produced, mixed and edited by the trio, with Tompkins performing the vocals.

=== Freelance compositions ===
Ortiz has also written music for use in the Ambient Metal Constructions series. The series consists of three Producer Loops sample packs, sold by the audio production company Prime Loops. He has also been cited offering music composition services for anything from theatre and dance projects, to television and multimedia ventures, with an aim to write music for video games and small films.

== Equipment ==
Ortiz uses Ibanez 7 and 8 string guitars and Apple Logic Pro to record, and uses IK Multimedia Amplitube 5 plugins for effects.

== Discography ==
=== As Chimp Spanner ===
Date of release	Title
2005	Imperium Vorago
2009	At the Dream's Edge
2011	Superoreremix (EP)
2012	All Roads Lead Here (EP)
2021	Tombstone City (Single)
2021	Aurora (Single)
2021	Korruptor (Single)
2021	Mimic (Single)
2022	Hyper.Drive (Single)
2022	Fractured (feat. Daniel Tompkins) (Single)
2022	Sirens (Single)
2022	Machine God (Single)
2023	Until the End (Single)
