= New Device =

British rock band

- Origin: United Kingdom
- Genres: Rock, Hard rock
- Years active: 2007–present
- Labels: Powerage, Southwold Recordings, ND
- Members: Daniel Leigh; Greg 'Rozzy' Ison; Matt Mallery; Lzi Hayes
- Past members: Phil Kinman; Robb Wybrow; Shane Lee; Gaz Bolan; K.C. Leigh; Andy C Saxton; Nick Jones; James Arter; Nick Hughes
- Website: New Device Website

New Device are a UK-based hard rock band, established in late 2007. The band's style is rooted in classic rock of the 1980s, influenced by bands such as: Aerosmith, Skid Row, Metallica and Guns N' Roses. They first gained a modicum of fame via their Myspace site, when they uploaded early demos which were successfully received by fans.

== Takin' Over ==
New Device began the recording process for their debut album Takin' Over in June 2008, with Ryan Richards of Funeral for a Friend handling drum duties. The album was released on Powerage Records on 20 July 2009. The band's debut single was the album's title track, "Takin' Over". Second single "In The Fading Light" was featured on the soundtrack for the British movie "Fish Tank". The band played at the Download Festival in 2009 and at the Sonisphere Festival in the same year.

The band appeared in Kerrang! magazine in their Introducing... section in October 2009. They have also appeared in Classic Rock magazine, Rock Sound magazine and Big Cheese magazine. New Device were nominated for "Best New Band" in the 2009 Classic Rock Awards; however, Sammy Hagar, Mike Anthony, Chad Smith and Joe Satriani's supergroup Chickenfoot went on to win the award.

== Touring ==
New Device supported Europe at their sold-out "Classic Rock Roll of Honour Awards" gig at the Relentless Garage venue in Islington on 1 November 2009. The band then completed two tours of the UK in 2009; the first was with Scottish rock band Gun, in November. This tour saw vocalist Dan Leigh duet with Dante Gizzi from Gun on a cover of the Beastie Boys song, "Fight For Your Right (To Party)" on the Glasgow date. The second leg of the tour was a support slot with joint headliners, Heaven's Basement and Dear Superstar.

In 2010 the band underwent a lineup change, with both Phil Kinman and Robb Wybrow leaving the band. New members were inducted: Shane Lee and Gaz Bolan (guitars) and Andy Saxton (bass guitar). The new lineup's first tour of 2010 was in support for Dear Superstar. During this tour it was announced that the band were to support Bon Jovi for one date at the O2 Arena (London), playing to an estimated audience of 23,000 people. They also opened the 2010 High Voltage Festival in Victoria Park, London.

=== 2011–12 ===
New Device headlined the "Powerage Tour" in February 2011 - a series of free shows across the UK, showcasing bands signed to the Powerage record label. Guitarist K.C. Leigh replaced departing bandmembers Lee and Bolan at this time. Alongside New Device, the Powerage Tour also featured The Treatment, Lethargy and Million Dollar Reload.

After this tour the band took a break, to focus on writing their second album. They debuted new songs in a gig at The Borderline venue in London on 29 November 2011, and a series of live dates with The Treatment followed throughout December. The recording process began in early 2012.

A new lineup was announced in April 2012: Daniel Leigh (vocals), Greg 'Rozzy' Ison (drums), Matt Mallery and Nick Jones (guitars), and Nick Hughes (bass guitar). A new song entitled "Kingdom of the Damned" was posted on the band's official website in June 2012. Their second album, Here We Stand was released in May 2013, preceded by the single, "Save Your Life".

=== 2015–16 ===
2014 saw the departure of guitarist Nick Jones, who was replaced by James Arter. In July 2014, New Device recorded their first live album, Takin' Over London, which was released in May 2015. The band then became a four-piece, having parted ways with James Arter.

== Band members ==
Current members

- Daniel Leigh - lead vocals, rhythm guitar (2007-present)
- Greg 'Rozzy' Ison - drums (2007-present)
- Matt Mallery - lead guitar, backing vocals (2012-present)
- Elizabeth "Lzi" Hayes - bass guitar, backing vocals (2017-present)

Former members

- Phil Kinman - lead guitar (2007-2010)
- Robb Wybrow - rhythm guitar (2007-2010)
- Shane Lee - lead guitar (2010-2011)
- Gaz Bolan - rhythm guitar (2010-2011)
- K.C. Leigh - lead guitar (2011-2012)
- Andy C Saxton - bass guitar (2007-2012)
- Nick Jones - rhythm guitar (2012-2014)
- James Arter - rhythm guitar (2014-2015)
- Nick Hughes - bass guitar (2012-2017)

== Discography ==
Studio albums

- Takin' Over (2009)
- Here We Stand (2013)

Live albums

- Takin' Over London (2015)

Extended plays

- Devils on the Run (2016)
- Coming Home (2017)
- Karoshi (2020)
