= Wired Desire =

- Origin: Glasgow, Scotland, UK
- Genres: Hard rock Rock'n'Roll
- Years active: 2006 – present
- Labels: Wired Desire
- Website: www.wireddesire.co.uk

Wired Desire is a Scottish hard rock band which was formed in Glasgow in 2005 with their first album in 2008. They have toured the UK supporting many bands including Wishbone Ash and Nazareth. Their debut EP, Barely Illegal, received positive reviews, most notably from Classic Rock Magazine. Nazareth called Wired Desire, their best support act ever.
