= High Voltage Festival =

Music festival in London, England

- Genre: Rock; heavy metal; progressive rock
- Dates: End of July
- Locations: London, UK
- Years active: 2010–2011
- Website: www.highvoltagefestival.com

High Voltage was a Classic Rock music festival, held twice in Victoria Park, London, promoted by The Mama Group PLC in partnership with Classic Rock Magazine.

The event hosted artists from various strands of rock music, including classic rock, progressive rock, and heavy metal. The first festival was held on 24 and 25 July 2010.

The second took place on 23 and 24 July 2011, with Nick Ladd, the founder of Glade Festival who was already working with the Mama Group to establish Wilderness Festival, drafted in as the new Festival Director. The festival was not held in 2012 to avoid clashing with the London Olympics, and it did not return in 2013 despite an much improved financial result in 2011.

== History ==
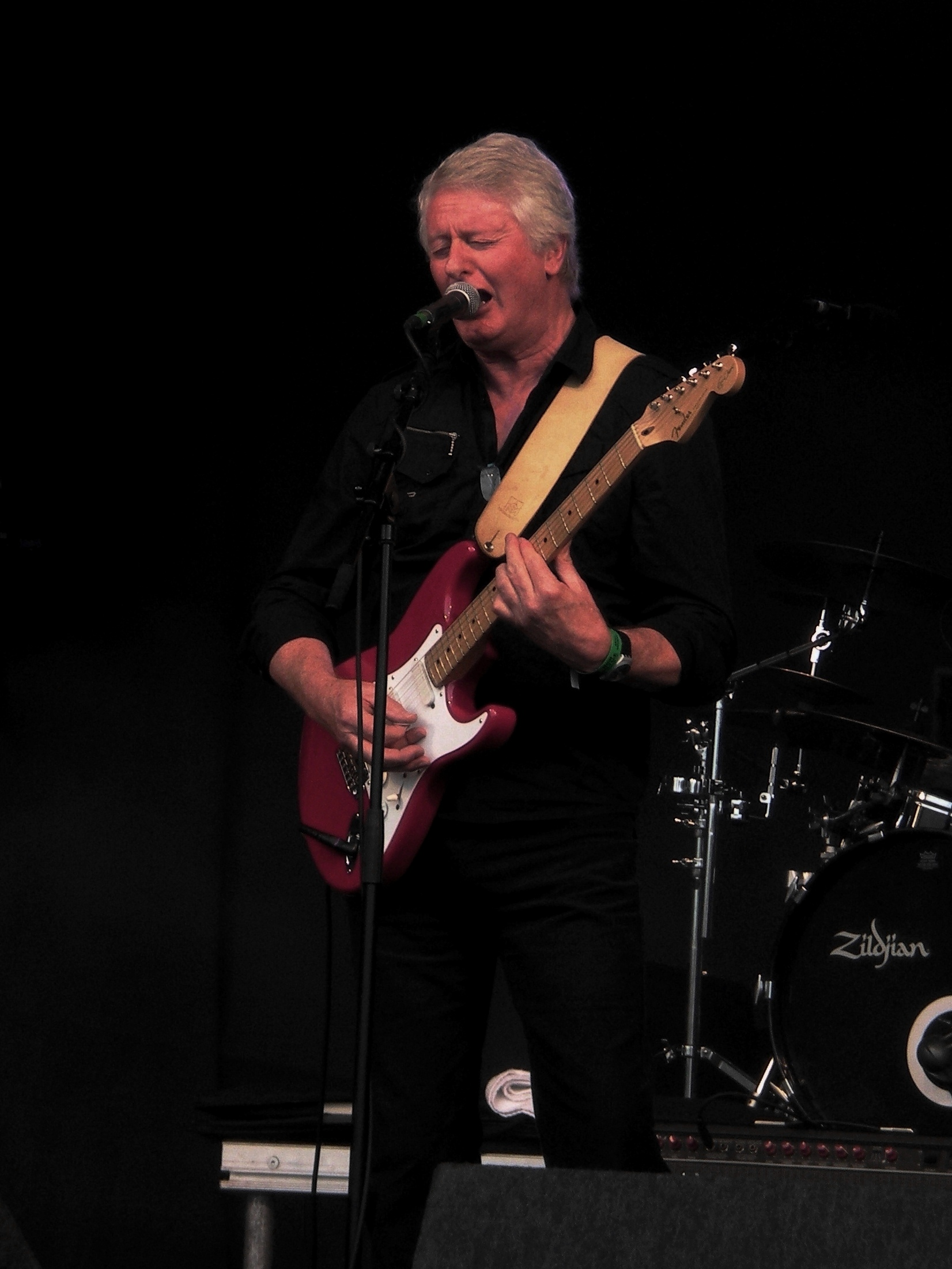
Pye Hastings at the High Voltage Festival 2011

- During the first festival, the Heaven and Hell set was a tribute concert to Ronnie James Dio who had died some months earlier. Jørn Lande and Glenn Hughes performed the vocals for the set.
- Judas Priest played what was billed as their last UK festival appearance at the High Voltage Festival in 2011, as part of their Epitaph World Tour.

== 2011 ==
The Mama Groups set times for 2011 were announced on 18 July 2011.

=== Classic Rock stage ===
| Saturday | Sunday |
| Judas Priest (20:35–22:50); Slash (18:55–19:55); Thin Lizzy (17:35–18:25); Queensrÿche (16:20–17:05); Rival Sons (15:20–15:50); Skin (14:25–14:55); Michael Monroe (13:30–14:00) | Dream Theater (20:20–22:20); Black Country Communion (18:35–19:35); Thunder (17:15–18:05); Michael Schenker Group (16:00–16:45); Saint Jude (15:00–15:35); Heaven's Basement (14:00–14:35); Love Fungus (13:00–13:20) |

=== Prog stage ===
| Saturday | Sunday |
| John Lees' Barclay James Harvest (19:35–20:50); Neal Morse (18:00–19:00); Anathema (16:45–17:30); Caravan (15:30–16:15); Amplifier (14:30–15:00); Von Hertzen Brothers (13:30–14:00) | Jethro Tull (19:20–20:35); Spock's Beard (18:00–18:45); Mostly Autumn (16:45–17:30); Curved Air (15:30–16:15); The Enid (14:30–15:00); Pallas (13:30–14:00) |

=== Metal Hammer stage ===
| Saturday | Sunday |
| ~~Electric Wizard~~ (21:00–21:45); Grand Magus (19:45–20:30); Sylosis (18:30–19:15); Triggerfinger (17:15–18:00); Ravens Creed (16:15–16:45); Primitai (15:15–15:45); Attica Rage (14:15–14:45) | Neurosis (18:45–20:25); Black Spiders (17:30–18:15); Graveyard (16:30–17:00); Gentlemans Pistols (15:30–16:00); The Treatment (14:30–15:00); FuryOn (13:30–14:00) |

=== Other ===
There was also an Evel Knievel exhibition; a beer festival with bands playing, including The Amber Herd who headlined on the Sunday; and the Ace Café area – featuring performances from The Crazy World of Arthur Brown (which was recorded and subsequently released on limited edition vinyl as The Crazy World of Arthur Brown Live at High Voltage), Aaron Keylock, and Allegra Shock.

Electric Wizard couldn't make the festival in time, due to flight disruptions caused by events in Norway, so Rival Sons played a headline set in their place.

== 2010 ==
=== Classic Rock stage ===
| Saturday | Sunday |
| ZZ Top; Heaven and Hell; Foreigner; Gary Moore; The Answer; The Union | Emerson, Lake & Palmer; Joe Elliott's Down 'n' Outz; Ian Hunter; Joe Bonamassa; Bachman & Turner; UFO; The Quireboys |

=== Prog stage ===
| Saturday | Sunday |
| Transatlantic; Asia; Zappa Plays Zappa; Bigelf; Focus; Pendragon; Touchstone | Marillion; Argent; Uriah Heep; Magnum; Martin Turner's Wishbone Ash; Steve Hackett; The Reasoning |

=== Metal Hammer stage ===
| Saturday | Sunday |
| Black Label Society; Saxon; Cathedral; HammerFall; Orange Goblin; Black Spiders; New Device | Down; ~~Venom~~; Opeth; Clutch; High on Fire; Audrey Horne; Lethargy |

Attendance over two days: around 30,000
