= Million Dollar Reload =

Former rock band from Northern Ireland

- Origin: Northern Ireland
- Genres: Hard rock
- Years active: 2006–2015 · 2015-Present (as Blackwater Conspiracy)
- Labels: Powerage, Frontiers Records, EMI
- Past members: Phil Conalane; Brian Mallon; Kie McMurray; Fionnbharr O'Hagain; Kevy Brennan; Davy Cassa; Sean McKernan; Andrew Mackle

Million Dollar Reload was a hard rock band formed in County Tyrone, Northern Ireland in 2006. The band recorded two studio albums and a live album before rebranding themselves as Blackwater Conspiracy in 2015.

== Formation and Needle, Blackout, Fly ==
The band was formed by lead singer Phil Conalane and bassist Kie McMurray. Conalane, McMurray and guitarist Andrew Mackle were all experienced musicians, playing in various cover bands before deciding to collaborate on writing of original material. The results were soon recorded and formed their first EP, entitled 'Needle, Blackout, Fly'. Drummer Davy Cassa was then recruited for purposes of the recording sessions before joining the band full-time. Guitarist Brian Mallon was recruited by McMurray as a second guitarist for the bands live performances, before also joining the band full-time.

Before starting the recording of their debut album, the band, excluding Cassa, were recruited by Steven Adler of Guns N' Roses as his backing band playing under Adler's Appetite. The band performed with Adler in Ireland after he had fired his own band during the European leg of their 2006 tour. This inspired the band to enter the studio and begin the recording process for their debut album, Anthems Of A Degeneration.

== Anthems Of A Degeneration ==
Anthems of a Degeneration was recorded at Manor Park Studios in Northern Ireland, and was produced by Neal Calderwood. Released in 2007, the album was initially a self-release, only available in physical format and through the bands website. After two years of continued sales, the album was picked up by Powerage Records in the UK and re-released in 2010. This point proved to be a major turning point for the band who were quickly offered a release in Japan on Hydrant/Universal Records.

Cassa was replaced by Sean McKernan. Several high-profile support slots followed, most notably for Alice Cooper and later for English band The Darkness in the Ulster Hall, Belfast. The promotion of the album continued with a UK club tour, followed by a 10 date US tour. On returning to the UK, the band spent the summer of 2012 playing a number of festivals, such as Download Festival and Bloodstock. At this point, Million Dollar Reload were being managed by ex-Sanctuary manager Dave Thorne who previously worked with other musicians, like Helloween, Arch Enemy and Bruce Dickinson. Thorne has been credited by artists such as Jon Bon Jovi for helping them achieve international success. Thorne continued to manage Million Dollar Reload for the remainder of their career and even after their rebranding.

== A Sinner's Saint ==
Their second album, A Sinner's Saint, was recorded in 2011, again at Manor Park Studios under producer Neal Calderwood. Finn O'Hagain had replaced McKernan on drums following McKernan's departure from the band. Frontiers Records signed the band in 2012 and subsequently released the album worldwide in July of the same year. UK tours and several European festival and club shows followed.

For a period of time, Conalane was touted in the media as the new singer for US rockers Velvet Revolver after the departure of Scott Weiland. Conalane denied that any approach by Velvet Revolver had been made.

== As Real As It Gets ==
Million Dollar Reload were dropped by Frontiers Records in 2014 after a refusal by the label to release their newly recorded live album, As Real As It Gets, which had been recorded at a club show in Northern Ireland. Million Dollar Reload self-released the album on their own, newly formed label, Bulletproof 20/20 Records. A pivotal European tour followed as support to the Atlanta-based Blackberry Smoke on their 'Fire in the Hole' tour. Guitarist Andrew Mackle unexpectedly quit halfway through the tour. The band, however, persevered, and finished the tour as a four piece before returning to Northern Ireland to reassess the future of the band after Mackle's departure.

The band continued for a short time with Conalane taking up second guitar duties while a suitable replacement was found. A short time thereafter, keyboard player Kevy Brennan was recruited, as the band transitioned from hard rock band to a more laid back, rock-n-roll style throughout 2015.

== Rebranding and Blackwater Conspiracy ==
A decision was made that, given their change in musical style, Million Dollar Reload would benefit from rebranding, to move the project forward. Million Dollar Reload became Blackwater Conspiracy, with a surprise announcement during a gig at the Belfast Empire in August 2015. A new backdrop and logo design was unveiled.

Blackwater Conspiracy went to Rockfield Studios, Wales in 2016, to record the band's first album post-rebranding. This album, entitled Shootin' The Breeze, was released in June 2017.

In 2020, Blackwater Conspiracy released their second album, entitled Two Tails and The Dirty Truth of Love and Revolution, and embarked on their Love and Revolution tour in 2021 (delayed from 2020 due to the COVID-19 pandemic) to promote the new album.

In June 2023, the band announced that they had signed with record label Golden Robot Records, and that new music is being made for the first time since 2020.

As of June 2023, Blackwater Conspiracy consists of singer Phil Conalane, guitarist Brian Mallon, bassist Kie McMurray, drummer Fionnbharr O'Hagain and keyboardist Kevy Brennan.

== Personnel ==
- Phil Conalane – vocals, guitar
- Brian Mallon – guitar, backing vocals
- Kie McMurray – bass guitar, backing vocals
- Fionnbharr O'Hagain – drums
- Kevy Brennan - keyboard, backing vocals
- Andrew Mackle – guitar, backing vocals (2006-2014)
- Sean McKernan - drums (2011-2012)
- Davy Cassa - drums (2006-2011)

== Discography ==
=== Albums ===
As Million Dollar Reload

- Anthems Of A Degeneration (2010)
- A Sinner's Saint (2012)
- As Real As It Gets (2013)

As Blackwater Conspiracy

• Shootin' The Breeze (2017)

• Two Tails and The Dirty Truth of Love and Revolution (2020)

== Other sources ==
- "Manor Park Studio". Manorparkstudio.co.uk.
- Bosso, Joe (2 December 2008). "Have Velvet Revolver finally found their new singer?". MusicRadar.com.
- "Rumour - VELVET REVOLVER Recruit New Singer?". Bravewords.com.
- "CRR Review - Million Dollar Reload - A Sinners Saint". Classicrockrevisited.com.
- Conley, Tony (17 July 2012). "Rock Guitar Daily with Tony Conley: Million $ Reload - Rock & Roll Straight Up with No Chaser". Rockguitardaily/blogspot.com.
- Anthems of A Degeneration, Amazon.com
- "Million Dollar Reload - Anthems Of A Degeneration". Discogs.com.
- "MILLION $ RELOAD sign to Powerage Records and announce release date for new album". Uberrock.co.uk.
- Wall, Mick (11 November 2010). Metallica: Enter Night: The Biography. Orion. ISBN 9781409112976 – via Google Books.
- "Million Dollar Reload / Blackwater Conspiracy – Belfast, Empire Music Hall, 8 August 2015". Planetmosh.com. 18 August 2015.
