= Basick Records =

British record label

- Founder: Nathan Philips & Jake Smith
- Distributors: Prosthetic/RED (North America), The Orchard (worldwide)
- Genre: Progressive metal, metalcore, ambient
- Country of origin: United Kingdom
- Location: London
- Official website: basickrecords.com

Basick Records is a British record label founded in 2005 by Nathan "Barley" Phillips and his half brother Jake Smith. Their business has since expanded into the Invictus Music & Media group, which includes Basick Records itself, the hardcore punk-oriented label Destroy Everything and the PR company Hold Tight! PR. Basick Records' first release was a compilation album, entitled, "Do You Feel This?", released on 8 August 2005. The first band to be signed to Basick was Fellsilent. They were also the first label to release material from Enter Shikari.

In 2011, Basick made a global distribution deal (excluding North America) with Warner ADA. Then, on 17 January 2012, they announced a North American distribution partnership with Prosthetic Records, in which selections from Basick's back catalog and all forthcoming releases would see distribution in North America from Prosthetic.

== Roster ==
=== Current artists ===
- A Dark Orbit
- A Trust Unclean
- Alaya
- Aliases
- Bad Sign
- BEAR
- Chimp Spanner
- Create to Inspire
- Damned Spring Fragrantia
- Dissipate
- Fall of Minerva
- First Signs of Frost
- FOES
- Misery Signals
- Murdock
- No Consequence
- Sikth
- The Colour Line

=== Past artists ===
- 7 Horns 7 Eyes
- Between the Screams
- Blotted Science
- Bury Tomorrow
- Circles
- Devil Sold His Soul
- Evita
- Fellsilent (except North America)
- Gehenna VII VII VII
- Glass Cloud
- Intervals
- Ion Dissonance
- Moesaboa
- Monuments
- My Minds Weapon
- Napoleon
- No Made Sense
- Shy of the Depth
- Skyharbor
- Sleep Token
- The Abner
- The Algorithm
- The Arusha Accord
- The Comanche Cipher
- The Escape
- Uneven Structure
- Visions
- Without Thought
