= Welcome to Hell (song) =

Single by Black Midi

from the album Hellfire
- Released: 9 May 2022
- Genre: Avant-prog; art rock; alternative metal
- Length: 4:09
- Label: Rough Trade
- Songwriters: Geordie Greep, Cameron Picton, Morgan Simpson
- Producer: Marta Salogni

Black Midi singles chronology
| "Cruising" (2021) | "Welcome to Hell" (2022) | "Eat Men Eat" (2022) |

Music video
- "Welcome to Hell" on YouTube

"Welcome to Hell" is a song by English rock band Black Midi, released in 2022 as the lead single from their third studio album, Hellfire. A satirical anti-war song, "Welcome to Hell" tells the story of Tristan Bongo, a soldier who engages in hedonistic acts while on shore leave to dull the trauma he has endured during war.

The song was first teased with a cryptic video on the band's youtube channel on 8 May 2022. It released a day later on 9 May 2022, coinciding with the announcement of Hellfire, with a surreal music video by Gustaf Holtenäs whom previously directed the video for "Slow" from Cavalcade. The music video shares the same protagonist featured in "Slow", depicted as an incel stalking a lagomorphic woman.

== Composition and lyrics ==
Described by Consequence as having "mathy rhythm section and a searing breakdown", "Welcome to Hell" is a rock song with avant-garde and progressive elements, and an outro reminiscent of thrash metal.

Frontman Geordie Greep explained in an interview the perspective of the song's narrative being inspired by George S. Patton:

The person speaking is a senior officer berating a junior one about his lack of involvement in this kind of merriment. So he's lecturing this guy, getting progressively irate and eventually dismissing him. The one point where we switch from this perspective is where you go to the soldier's memory of the speech he saw when training. So this is kind of this General Patton character saying: this is how it's going to be in the war. It's conveniently italicized, so you know it's a different scene.

== Critical reception ==
Through this narrative, Greep provides an avatar for the audience that is unaccustomed to those things, and is eventually dishonorably discharged from his service, begging the question: What does all the violence and mayhem truly serve at the end of the day? Are wartime horrors born from justice, from servicing the egos of disreputable characters, or are they truly an inevitable desire from the ugliest depths of the human appetite?

— Jason Friedman, Paste

"Welcome to Hell" has received praise, being referred to in Paste's review of Hellfire as "arguably the album’s most concise mission statement, [and] among the finest songs the band has released to date". NME's review held similar acclaim, calling the song "perhaps [the album's] most engrossing listen". In PopMatters' review, Justin Velucci wrote of "excellent, rapid-fire stops and starts courtesy of drummer Morgan Simpson’s tightly wrapped snare" and concluded "even here, there is a method to the madness, with the trio staying in rock-solid unison as notes start violently careening off the walls."

The song made year-end lists as well. Evan Rytlewski wrote for Pitchfork, "Many songs have contended that war is hell; few have ever depicted that hell as crazed as this." In Dig!'s list, it received high praise: "Welcome To Hell should restore listeners’ faith in guitar music – black midi are its saviours."

== Personnel ==
- Geordie Greep - Vocals, Fender Stratocaster, Resonator Guitar, K. Yairi Classical Guitar, Mandolin, Gibson SG, Bechstein Grand Piano (+ with Pillow and Laptop Mute), Percussion (Snaps, Claps, Stamps, Orchestral Whip), Arturia Microbrute, Accordion, ACME Police Whistle
- Cameron Picton - Rickenbacker 4003, Arturia Pigments, Misc Synths, Percussion (España C3, Snaps, Claps, Stamps), Sound FX
- Morgan Simpson - Green Kit, Ludwig Vistalite Kit, Percussion (Shaker, Tambourine, Cowbell, Cabasa, Guiro, Woodblock, Chimes, Doumbek, Snaps, Claps, Stamps, China Cymbal)
- Kaidi Akinnibi - Tenor Saxophone, Soprano Saxophone
- Joe Bristow - Trombone
- Blossom Caldarone - Cello
- Joscelin Dent-Pooley - Violin
- Max Goulding - Percussion (Snaps, Claps, Stamps)
- Paul Jones - Vespa
- Ife Ogunjobi - Trumpet
