= The Black Midi Anthology Vol. 1: Tales of Suspense and Revenge =

Compilation album by Black Midi
- Released: 5 June 2020
- Recorded: 2020
- Genres: Experimental rock; post-rock; noise rock; audiobook
- Length: 119:10
- Label: Self-released
- Producers: Dan Carey; Black Midi

Black Midi chronology
Black Midi Live in the USA (2020)	The Black Midi Anthology Vol. 1: Tales of Suspense and Revenge (2020)	Cavalcade (2021)

The Black Midi Anthology Vol. 1: Tales of Suspense and Revenge is an anthology album by English rock band Black Midi, self-released on 5 June 2020. Running nearly two hours in length, the album was released as a download only, exclusively to Bandcamp, as part of the website's monthly revenue waiver to support artists during the COVID-19 pandemic.

== Composition ==
The first four tracks on the album consist of short stories (written by prominent literary figures including Ernest Hemingway and Edgar Allan Poe) read by the members of the band over instrumental jams. Three instrumental tracks, taken from much of the same recordings as the backing jams for the spoken word tracks, are also included. The band refers to the release as an audiobook on its website.

== Release ==
Due to the financial impact of the COVID-19 pandemic on musicians in 2020 from not being able to tour, Bandcamp announced it would be waiving its share of revenue and donating all sales to artists for 24 hours on March 20. Bandcamp repeated the initiative in the following months, including on June 5. Black Midi contributed The Black Midi Anthology Vol. 1: Tales of Suspense and Revenge specifically for the initiative on this day. The album remained available on the band's Bandcamp page afterwards. The album came a month after the release of another spoken word performance by Black Midi, an 18-minute recital of "The Beggar and the King", a one-act play by Winthrop Parkhurst.

== Track listing ==
The Black Midi Anthology Vol. 1: Tales of Suspense and Revenge
No.	Title	Length
1.	"A Woman's Confession (by Guy De Maupassant)"	11:17
2.	"Who Is to Pay? (extract from The Ragged Trousered Philanthropists by Robert Tressell)"	4:18
3.	"Out of Season (by Ernest Hemingway)"	15:40
4.	"Hop Frog (by Edgar Allan Poe)"	23:33
5.	"Instrumental 1"	24:45
6.	"Instrumental 2"	23:57
7.	"Instrumental 3"	15:40
Total length:		119:10

== Personnel ==
Black Midi

- Geordie Greep – voice on "Hop-Frog" and "A Woman's Confession", baritone guitar
- Matt Kwasniewski-Kelvin – electric guitar
- Cameron Picton – bass guitar, voice on "Who Is to Pay?"
- Morgan Simpson – drums, voice on "Out of Season"

Additional

- Dan Carey – live FX, producer
- Alexis Smith – engineer and tape operator
- Stories produced, engineered and edited by Black Midi.
