= Sugar/Tzu =

Single by Black Midi

from the album Hellfire
- Released: 12 July 2022
- Genre: Jazz fusion; post-punk; math rock
- Length: 3:50
- Label: Rough Trade
- Songwriters: Geordie Greep, Cameron Picton, Morgan Simpson
- Producer: Marta Salogni

Black Midi singles chronology
"Eat Men Eat" (2022)	"Sugar/Tzu" (2022)

Music video
- "Sugar/Tzu" on YouTube

"Sugar/Tzu" is a song by English rock band Black Midi, released in 2022 as the third single from their third studio album, Hellfire. The song tells the story of a futuristic boxing match wherein one of the contenders is assassinated by a young boy. It was released with a music video directed by Noel Paul that went on to win "Best Cinematography in a Video" at the 2022 UK Music Video Awards. A live recording of the song at Electrical Audio was released on flexi disc and bundled with copies of Hellfire sold in independent record stores in the United States.

== Composition and lyrics ==
"Sugar/Tzu" is a jazz fusion song featuring elements of post-punk and math rock, with Uncut describing it as "veering from tender and gentle restraint to volatile and discordant bursts of squealing guitar and drums."

The song's narrative came from lead vocalist and guitarist Geordie Greep's love of boxing, feeling that the sport was "the closest thing to the thrill of listening to music." In a press release, he highlighted the themes of violence and spectacle in the song:

There is a little joke here. It is regular for a boxing audience to bemoan an early stoppage, the official stepping in to save a fighter who could’ve gone on. And while there is the surface agreement of most that ‘it was the right thing to do,’ there seems to be often left unsaid the fact that we actually do want to see a brutal knockout. And in the split second where these one-shot, punch-perfect, coma-inducing blows do occur, there is an undeniable rush. The boy in this story feels he is a hero for giving the crowd what they all really want. This is not to say the song is a critique of boxing or anything of the like – I love the sport – but it is an interesting and rare phenomenon worth exploring.

== Critical reception ==
The Fader placed "Sugar/Tzu" at number 30 on their list "The 100 Best Songs of 2022". Atwood Magazine placed it on their own year-end list as well, with Andrew Daly saying of the song and Hellfire "this record is the Trout Mask Replica for the modern era. Heavy praise, to be sure, but well-deserved nonetheless."

== Personnel ==
- Geordie Greep – vocals, Yamaha SA60, Burns Double 6, Espana CS-40, Gibson Dove, Bechstein Grand Piano, Rhodes 54, optigan, accordion, horn arrangement
- Cameron Picton – Rickenbacker 4003, Hofner Senator Bass, Arturia Pigments, Arturia Synthi, marxophone, xylophone, flute, crowd noise
- Morgan Simpson – Ludwig Vistalite Kit, percussion (tambourines, salt shaker, guiro, clave, cowbell)
- Kaidi Akinnibi – Soprano saxophone, baritone saxophone, tenor saxophone
- Joe Bristow – trombone
- Ife Ogunjobi – trumpet
- Hus Ragip - boxing announcer
