= Live Fire =

Live Fire may refer to:

- Live Fire, a Black Midi album
- "Live Fire" (Star Wars Resistance)
