= Hellfire (Black Midi album) =

Studio album by Black Midi
- Released: 15 July 2022
- Recorded: 13 June – 13 August 2021
- Studio: Hoxa HQ (London)
- Genres: Experimental rock; progressive rock; jazz fusion; post-punk; avant-prog; brutal prog
- Length: 38:54
- Label: Rough Trade
- Producer: Marta Salogni

Black Midi chronology
Cavalcade (2021)	Hellfire (2022)

Singles from Hellfire
- 1. "Welcome to Hell" Released: 9 May 2022; 2. "Eat Men Eat" Released: 15 June 2022; 3. "Sugar/Tzu" Released: 12 July 2022

Hellfire is the third and final studio album by English rock band Black Midi, released on 15 July 2022 on Rough Trade Records. The band recorded the majority of the album over a thirteen-day period with producer Marta Salogni, who had previously worked with the band in recording the song "John L" from their second studio album.

Released to critical acclaim, the album was preceded by the singles "Welcome to Hell", "Eat Men Eat", and "Sugar/Tzu", and entered the UK Albums Chart at No. 22, becoming the band's highest-charting album to date. During the writing and recording process, the band experimented with first-person narratives, and expanded upon their sound with the introduction of cabaret, country, flamenco, and show tune influences. After touring in promotion of the album throughout the rest of 2022 and 2023, Black Midi announced an indefinite hiatus in August 2024.

== Background and composition ==
Hellfire was written while the band was isolating in London, with singer Geordie Greep calling Hellfire "an epic action film [...] if Cavalcade was a drama". He described the characters depicted in the album as being "scumbag[s]. Almost everything I write is from a true thing, something I experienced and exaggerated and wrote down. I don't believe in Hell, but all that old world folly is great for songs."

Written during the COVID-19 pandemic, the majority of Hellfire's songs were debuted during the band's 2021–2022 tour in support of Cavalcade. The bulk of the album was recorded in thirteen days, with additional members Kaidi Akinnibi (saxophone) and Seth Evans (keyboards) contributing to the recording process.

Musically, 25 Years Later labeled Hellfire an experimental rock album, with Beats Per Minute describing the album's sound as primarily comprising progressive rock, jazz fusion, and post-punk. Exclaim! saw Black Midi become jazz-rockers for Hellfire, while DIY noted their use of art rock's pacing and precision. Alongside their prog stylings, cabaret, country, flamenco, and show tunes influences appear.

== Recording ==
The band entered the studio with a "preliminary tracklist" for the album in mind: "[It] allowed us to give more space for the transition and general shape of the record, to help each song complement each other, rather than just feeling random or anything like that. That way, when you have a jarring change, it's welcomed."

== Release ==
During the band's 2022 tour, shirts saying "Welcome to Hell" were sold with the date of 15 July 2022 hidden in a phone number. Many previously unreleased songs from Hellfire were performed by the band on the tour. The first week of May the band posted teaser clips and a Tetris-like browser game, featuring a MIDI version of their song "Welcome to Hell". On 9 May, the band revealed their third studio album and released the song as a single with a video directed by Gustaf Holtenäs, who also directed the video for "Slow" from Cavalcade. On 15 June, a new single titled "Eat Men Eat" was released and features a music video by Maxim Kelly. On 12 July, the third single, "Sugar/Tzu" was released with a video directed by Noel Paul. On 14 July 2022, the band hosted a listening party on their YouTube channel, playing the entire album.

Selected vinyl pre-orders of Hellfire came with flexi discs of several of the band's tracks throughout their career, all recorded live at Electrical Audio by Steve Albini in November 2021.

During the week of the album's release, the UK suffered a heatwave which was described as "hellfire" by several news outlets. On 19 July, where the temperature rose to a record high of 40.3 °C, Black Midi drove an ice cream van across London, selling Hellfire, ice creams, and limited edition merchandise.

== Critical reception ==
Professional ratings
Aggregate scores
Source	Rating
Metacritic	79/100
Review scores
Source	Rating
AllMusic	3.5/5 stars
DIY	4/5 stars
Exclaim!	9/10
The Guardian	4/5 stars
The Line of Best Fit	9/10
NME	4/5 stars
Paste	8.6/10
Pitchfork	7.8/10
Slant Magazine	4/5 stars

Hellfire received a score of 79 out of 100 based on twenty-two critics' reviews at review aggregator Metacritic, indicating "generally favorable" reception. Steve Erickson of Slant Magazine described the album as a "concept album ripe for repeat listens" designed to be heard in its entirety, which "engages with rock's history while simultaneously taking it in imaginative new directions". Writing for The Line of Best Fit, Kyle Kohner found Hellfire to be Black Midi at "their most devilish and maniacal", sounding "miraculously and hideously new, proving their aversion to any mindless repetition".

Comparing the album to the band's previous work, Paul Simpson at AllMusic claimed that, "While their 2019 debut, Schlagenheim, was an overloaded, volatile mixture of post-punk and math rock, somewhat resembling a no wave band who grew up watching too much Ren & Stimpy, 2021's Cavalcade found the group exploring a lushly orchestrated avant-prog sound, switching between spiky, angular workouts and softer, more patient compositions. Hellfire moves further in this direction, but with a greater sense of showmanship. Lead vocalist Geordie Greep sounds more like a delirious carnival barker than before, and the music brings to mind Mr. Bungle and Fred Frith more so than the King Crimson-isms of Black Midi's past work."

== Track listing ==
Hellfire track listing
No.	Title	Length
1.	"Hellfire"	1:24
2.	"Sugar/Tzu"	3:50
3.	"Eat Men Eat"	3:08
4.	"Welcome to Hell"	4:09
5.	"Still"	5:46
6.	"Half Time"	0:26
7.	"The Race Is About to Begin"	7:15
8.	"Dangerous Liaisons"	4:14
9.	"The Defence"	2:59
10.	"27 Questions"	5:43
Total length:		38:54

== Personnel ==
Adapted from the liner notes of the album.

Black Midi

- Geordie Greep – lead vocals (1, 2, 4, 7–10), accordion (1–5, 7–10), resonator guitar (1, 4, 7, 9), Bechstein grand piano (1–4, 6–10), mandolin (1, 4, 10), K. Yairi Classical guitar (1, 4, 7, 9), Gibson SG electric guitar (1, 4, 6, 8, 10), Fender Stratocaster electric guitar (1, 4), Surfboard lap steel guitar (1, 2, 3, 5, 9), orchestral whip (1, 3, 4, 10), triangle (1), wind whistle (1, 3, 7), police whistle (1, 3, 4, 10), train whistle (1, 3, 10), Yamaha SA60 electric guitar (2, 7, 8, 10), Burns Double 6 electric 12-string guitar (2, 8), España CS-40 classical flamenco guitar (2, 7), Gibson Dove acoustic guitar (2), Rhodes 54 electric piano (2, 5, 10), Optigan (2), Rickenbacker 4003 bass guitar (3), snaps (4), claps (4), stomps (4), Arturia Microbrute (4, 7, 9, 10), Kay 5190J (5), wooden whip (5), Roland Jupiter 8 (6), lap steel guitar (7), Japanese classical guitar (10), Gibson ES 150D electric guitar (10), referee's whistle (10)
- Cameron Picton – lead vocals (3, 5), Rickenbacker 4003 bass guitar (1, 2, 4, 6–10), Hofner Senator electro-acoustic guitar (2, 7, 10), triangle (1), sampler (6), sound design (3, 6), flute (2, 3, 5, 7–9), drone (5), Hohner C harmonica (5, 9), marxophone (2, 3), miscellaneous synthesizers (4), xylophone (2), Arturia Pigments (2, 4), Arturia Synthi (2), crowd noise (2), España CS-40 classical flamenco guitar (3), K. Yairi Classical guitar (3, 4), Guild M-120 acoustic guitar (3, 5), picked Bechstein grand piano (3), sub bass (3), Gibson SG electric guitar (3, 5), National Archtop acoustic guitar (3, 5), Larry James 56 baritone guitar (3), snaps (4), claps (4, 5), stomps (4), sound FX (4), resonator guitar (5), field recordings (5), Björk bird instrument (5), Yamaha SA90 electric guitar (5), Silvertone guitar (5), Radio Bed (6), vocals (6)
- Morgan Simpson – snare (1), kick (1), china cymbals (1, 4, 5), tom (1), cabasa (1, 4, 8, 9, 10), crash cymbal (1), triangle (1), doumbek (1, 4, 10), Ludwig Vistalite Kit (2, 6–8, 10), tambourine (2–5, 7–10), salt shaker (2, 8, 9), guiro (2, 4, 10), clave (2), cowbell (2, 4, 7), Funky 405 Kit (3), maraca (3, 7), Green kit (4, 5, 7, 9, 10), snaps (4), claps (4, 5), stomps (4), woodblock (4, 7), chimes (4), shaker (4, 5, 10), hi-hat (7), hand drummed snare (8), WFM snare (9)

Additional performers

- Kaidi Akinnibi – alto saxophone (5), soprano saxophone (1, 2, 4, 5, 7), baritone saxophone (1, 2), tenor saxophone (1–5, 8, 9)
- Seth Evans – Bechstein grand piano (3, 5, 9), Hammond organ (5)
- Demi García Sabat – cajón (3, 5), palmas and percussion (3, 9), udu (3)
- Blossom Caldarone – cello (1, 3–5, 9, 10)
- Max Goulding – triangle (1), handclaps (4, 5), snaps (4), stomps (4)
- Joscelin Dent-Pooley – violin (1, 3–5, 9, 10)
- Ife Ogunjobi – trumpet (2–5, 7–9)
- Hus Ragip – boxing announcer (2)
- Paul Jones – Vespa (4)
- Joe MacLaren – electric upright bass (5, 7)
- BJ Cole – pedal steel guitar (5, 9, 10)
- Marta Salogni – Roland Jupiter 8 (5)
- Joe Bristow – trombone (2–5, 7–10)
- Radio Rahim – radio host (6)
- Finn Carter – grand piano (7)
- Mike Ro-Phone – percussion (10)
- Akiu Tonto, Alex Peters, Amy Caek, Antoine Ray, Barn Marts, Cole Clements, Curtis Fogg, Dean Ferguson, Emilio Bazan, Finn Gildea, Georgie Du Boulay, Jack Sheppard, Jc Lightbody, Jeremiah Fowl, Lorenzo Lorini, Lucas Lockeridge, Maia Ciarapica, Mario Morales, Milanka Caballero, Nathan Cheung, Olly Bate, Sophie Pritchard, Tj Critchy, Zachary Oberdier – burps (3)
- Alek Ertman, Antoine Ray 1, Atereick, Ben Dreblow, Benjamin Ford, Bidskimbudskum, Bruce Quasar, Cole Clements, Colin Hedberg, Christian Malinoski, Dan Milmine, Drew "Droneman" Goad-Pacheco, Ellaar, Felipe González, Fin "DaMando" Gildea, Gabe Lactu, Gus Crane, Jamie Teixido Ubeda, Johnny Rockstar, Josh Healing, Joshua Brenan, Keep Me Safe, Kian Kermani, Lee Pritchard, Luke Cherchenko, Matt Bisaccia, Mattsladedrone, Mr Chain Blue Lightning, Sam R, Tanner York, Teodor Vujic, The Kaj, Trevor Davies, Vincent Sgro – drone (5)

Production

- Marta Salogni – production
- Max Goulding – co-production
- Dani Bennett Spragg – engineering
- Luke Glazewski – additional engineering

Artwork

- David Rudnick
- Emiel Penninck
- Maharani Yasmine Putri

== Charts ==
Chart performance for Hellfire
Chart (2022)	Peak position
Australian Albums (ARIA)	45
Belgian Albums (Ultratop Flanders)	90
Belgian Albums (Ultratop Wallonia)	177
German Albums (Offizielle Top 100)	41
Irish Albums (IRMA)	65
Portuguese Albums (AFP)	24
Scottish Albums (Official Charts)	7
Swiss Albums (Schweizer Hitparade)	67
UK Albums (Official Charts)	22
UK Independent Albums (Official Charts)	4
US Billboard 200	139
