= Cavalcade (Black Midi album) =

Studio album by Black Midi
- Released: 28 May 2021
- Recorded: August – October 2020
- Studios: Hellfire (Montpelier Hill, Dublin); Hoxa HQ (London); Pony (London)
- Genres: Progressive rock; experimental rock; jazz fusion; math rock; avant-prog; post-punk; brutal prog
- Length: 42:19
- Label: Rough Trade
- Producers: Black Midi; John "Spud" Murphy; Marta Salogni

Black Midi chronology
The Black Midi Anthology Vol. 1 (2020)	Cavalcade (2021)	Hellfire (2022)

Singles from Cavalcade
- 1. "John L" Released: 23 March 2021; 2. "Slow (Loud)" Released: 28 April 2021; 3. "Chondromalacia Patella" Released: 19 May 2021

Cavalcade is the second studio album by English rock band Black Midi. It was released on 28 May 2021, through Rough Trade Records. The album was primarily recorded in the summer of 2020 with producer John "Spud" Murphy, with the exception of the song "John L", which was recorded beforehand with Marta Salogni. Guitarist Matt Kwasniewski-Kelvin, who left the band citing mental health reasons, does not appear on the album but has songwriting credits on the songs "John L" and "Chondromalacia Patella".

For Cavalcade, the band had a more premeditated approach to the writing and recording, as opposed to the improvisational approach taken for their debut studio album, Schlagenheim (2019). The opening track "John L" was released as a single in promotion of the album, followed by a louder mix of the fourth track "Slow", and finally "Chondromalacia Patella" before its release. The album received widespread acclaim, with critics complimenting the band's stylistic progression and composition.

== Background and recording ==
Black Midi began writing music for a new album in late 2019, not long after the release of their debut studio album, Schlagenheim, in June of that year. The band chose to have a less improvisational approach to writing their second studio album, in contrast to Schlagenheim which was crafted around jam sessions. Guitarist Geordie Greep said of the process, "People seemed to really like the debut album but after a while we all became pretty bored with it...So, it was like: this time let's make something that is actually good." Prior to the recording sessions for the album, guitarist Matt Kwasniewski-Kelvin took a break from the band, citing a need to focus on his mental health; he took part in the writing sessions for Cavalcade, however. Saxophonist Kaidi Akinnibi and keyboardist Seth Evans, who were a part of Black Midi's recent touring lineup, were a part of the album recording sessions.

The band first recorded "John L", the opening track, with Marta Salogni in London. The song features the sound of a helicopter unintentionally captured by studio microphones as it flew overhead. Afterward, they recorded the rest of the album with John "Spud" Murphy at Hellfire Studios on Montpelier Hill, County Dublin in September 2020, with overdubs at Hoxa HQ in London in October.

== Composition ==
The music of Cavalcade has been primarily described as progressive rock, experimental rock, jazz fusion, math rock and avant-prog. The album's lyrics revolve around depictions of "larger than life figures", with the figures depicted ranging from "a cult leader fallen on hard times and an ancient corpse found in a diamond mine to legendary cabaret singer Marlene Dietrich, strolling seductively past them".

== Release ==
Black Midi announced the details for Cavalcade on 23 March 2021, revealing its track listing and release date. On the same day, they released the album's lead single, the opening track "John L". A music video was also released for "John L". The single was backed with the non-album track "Despair". A 12-inch release for the single was made available for pre-order on 23 March and was released on 9 April. Cavalcade was released on 26 May 2021 through Rough Trade Records both digitally and physically, as a black vinyl, picture disc vinyl, CD, and cassette. Each pre-ordered vinyl copy of the album from either an independent record store, Rough Trade Shops, Rough Trade Records' webstore, or Tower Records includes a flexi disc containing a cover version of a specific song, selected by fans, from a premade playlist; the Tower Records release includes a CD in place of a flexi disc. The cover version is unique for each location, with separate covers being recorded for United States and United Kingdom-based independent record stores.

On 26 May 2021, Black Midi live streamed Cavalcade on their YouTube channel. Though the band and Rough Trade announced a release for 28 May, the album was immediately released on Apple Music, Bandcamp, and multiple other streaming platforms after the stream ended.

In the UK and the US, one "golden ticket" offering a choice of prizes was hidden in one standard black vinyl LP copy of Cavalcade. For this reason, this format was disqualified from contributing to the album's chart placement in the UK. A week after its release, the album entered the UK albums chart at number 60.

Following Cavalcade's release, Black Midi released a five-track 12-inch vinyl EP of songs from the album performed live, called Live-Cade, and a CD of cover versions, called Cover-Cade.

== Critical reception ==
Professional ratings
Aggregate scores
Source	Rating
Metacritic	81/100
Review scores
Source	Rating
AllMusic	3.5/5 stars
Exclaim!	9/10
Gigwise	9/10
The Line of Best Fit	9/10
Loud and Quiet	9/10
NME	4/5 stars
Paste	6.5/10
Pitchfork	8.0/10
PopMatters	7/10
Slant Magazine	3/5 stars

Cavalcade has been greeted with considerable acclaim from music reviewers. At Metacritic, which assigns a weighted mean rating out of 100 to reviews from mainstream publications, Cavalcade received a score of 81, based on 22 reviews.

In the review for Exclaim, Sydney Brasil declared "Cavalcade is an album of extremes, fluctuating between lounging wizardry and an angular, prog-rock nightmare. It's smart and well-calculated, expressing their range as musicians. Most importantly, it's the best path forward to keep speculators on their toes." Gigwise's Joe Smith shared similar sentiments, calling the album "a perfectly-executed offering of the band's development since album one. Instead of replicating the sound of their debut, they’ve shifted and sculpted it into a whole new beast, rich with barrier breaking expressionism and glistening soundscapes." Summarizing the review for The Line of Best Fit, Robin Ferris wrote that it was "a record that delights in its own darkness, and will not compromise any of its sickening, theatrical excess. It’s a triumph of the UK underground and a singular vision of a band completely detached from their listeners expectations."

John Amen was more critical in the review for PopMatters; "Throughout Cavalcade, Black Midi displays superlative skills, fierce chemistry, and avant-garde vision, offering spellbinding performances while also, perhaps inevitably, falling prey to sonic tautologies and circuitousness." In the review for AllMusic, Fred Thomas called it "intentionally oversaturated and designed to knock listeners off balance and at its best, the album's overpowering rush of sounds and ideas communicates the excitement and a sense of unlimited possibilities." Writing for Slant Magazine, Charles Lyons-Burt stated that "It’s an atmosphere-focused album that attempts to express the nastier side of being alive. The result is evocative but not necessarily satisfying." God Is in the TV's Jonathan Chadwick said "some of the gnarly bumps and edges that made Schlagenheim so exhilarating appear to have been sanded down – but admittedly, this gives way to a lushness on Cavalcade that wasn’t present on its predecessor".

=== Accolades ===
Cavalcade on year-end lists
Publication	List	Rank	Ref.
Pitchfork	The 50 Best Albums of 2021	23	

== Track listing ==
All music composed by Black Midi (Geordie Greep, Cameron Picton, Morgan Simpson). "John L" and "Chondromalacia Patella", by Greep, Picton, Simpson and Kwasniewski-Kelvin.^{[a]} All lyrics written and sung by Greep except "Slow" and "Diamond Stuff", written and sung by Picton. All tracks produced by Black Midi and John "Spud" Murphy, except "John L" produced by Marta Salogni.

Cavalcade track listing
No.	Title	Length
1.	"John L"	5:13
2.	"Marlene Dietrich"	2:53
3.	"Chondromalacia Patella"	4:49
4.	"Slow"	5:37
5.	"Diamond Stuff"	6:20
6.	"Dethroned"	5:02
7.	"Hogwash and Balderdash"	2:32
8.	"Ascending Forth"	9:53
Total length:		42:19

Japanese edition (bonus tracks)
No.	Title	Length
9.	"Despair"	3:34
10.	"Cruising"	6:27
Total length:		52:20

Notes

- ^{a}Band member Matt Kwasniewski-Kelvin does not appear on the album, but has writing credits on "John L", "Chondromalacia Patella" and "Cruising".
- Physical versions of Cavalcade contain the track "Introduction." Although the track is included as part of the main album on LP copies, it is hidden in the pregap before "John L" begins on CD copies. The track runs for 1:31, making the album's total runtime 43:50.
- The following songs were covered by the band and appear as bonus flexi-discs for pre-ordered vinyl copies of the album:
  - "Moonlight on Vermont" by Captain Beefheart (Rough Trade Records)
  - "21st Century Schizoid Man" by King Crimson (Rough Trade Shops)
  - "Love Story" by Taylor Swift (UK independent stores)
  - "Nothing Compares 2 U" by Prince (US independent stores)
  - Medley of "Psycho Killer" by Talking Heads and "Roxanne" by The Police (Tower Records; released as a CD)

== Personnel ==
Credits adapted from the album's liner notes.

Black Midi

- Geordie Greep – Surfboard Lapsteel (tracks "Introduction", 2, 6, 7), Roland Jupiter-8 (tracks "Introduction", 2–4, 6, 8), Reverend Descent (tracks 1, 3), Fret King Elise, acoustic piano, Minimoog Voyager (track 1), vocals (tracks 1–3, 6–8, "Cruising"), Yamaha SA60 (tracks 2, 4–8, "Cruising"), Epiphone Masterbilt Nylon guitar (tracks 2, 4, 6–8, "Cruising"), National Resophonic guitar (tracks 2, 4, 8, "Cruising"), Danelectro Vincent Bell Bellzouki (tracks 2, 5, 6, 7), accordion (tracks 2, 7, 8, "Cruising"), Washburn Parlor guitar (tracks 2, 8) , Optigan (tracks 2, 5), string arrangement (track 2), Fender Mustang, Gibson SG (tracks 3, 4, 6, 7), Roland Juno-60, Rhodes (track 3), grand piano (tracks 3, "Cruising"), Hammond organ (tracks 4, 5, "Cruising"), Supro Lapsteel (track 5), resonator guitar, Moog Grandmother (track 7), Silvertone Lapsteel, Gold Tone Resonator("Cruising")
- Cameron Picton – flute (tracks "Introduction", 2, 3, 5, 8, "Cruising"), Rickenbacker 4003 (tracks 1, 3–6, 8), Fender Jazz Bass (track 2), Marxophone (tracks 2, 5), Kay-5970J (tracks 2, 8), Elektron Digitone, Moog Grandmother, tin whistle (track 3), Kramer 650B (tracks 3, 7), upright bass (tracks 4, 5, "Cruising"), Fender Jazzmaster (track 4) , vocals (tracks 4, 5), Guild M-120, Arturia Pigments, Arturia Buchla Music Easel, Operator, Pendulate, Irish bouzouki, Greek bouzouki (track 5), Gibson ES-150D (track 6), sound effects (track 7), Vox Phantom Fretless ("Cruising")
- Morgan Simpson – Ludwig Pro Beat Versatile kit (track 1), Ludwig Club Date SE kit (tracks 2, 5, 8, "Cruising"), cabasa, güiro, wooden agogo (track 2), table salt shaker (tracks 2, 8), Maxwell Funky 405 kit (tracks 3, 4, 6, 7), tuned tom (Geordie holding the notes on a grand piano for resonance) (tracks 3, 7), tambourine (tracks 3, 4, 6, 7), shaker (tracks 3, 4), rainmaker, metal castanets(track 3), bongos (track 4), tuned kick (tracks 4, 7, 8, "Cruising"), Roto-toms (tracks 4, 6, 7), bowed cymbal, bowed wok, congas, egg shaker(track 5), hi-hat, china cymbal (track 6), temple blocks, doumbek, crash cymbal, piled cymbals(track 7), jingle shaker (track 8), brushed snare ("Cruising")

Additional musicians

- Kaidi Akinnibi – tenor saxophone (tracks "Introduction", 1, 3, 4, 6–8), soprano saxophone (tracks "Introduction", 1–5, 7, 8)
- Helicopter Pilot – helicopter (track 1)
- Joscelin Dent-Pooley – violin (tracks 1, 8)
- Seth Evans – Bechstein grand piano (tracks 2–5, 7, 8, "Cruising"), Rhodes 54 (tracks 2, 8, "Cruising"), Nord Electro 5D harpsichord (tracks 2, 3, 8), organ (track 8)
- Blossom Caldarone – cello (tracks 2, 5, 8), vocals (track 5)
- Joe Bristow – trombone (tracks 3, 4, 8)
- Rosie Alena – vocals (track 5)

Technical personnel

- Marta Salogni – programming (track 1), mixing (track 1)
- Grace Banks – engineering (track 1)
- Elliott Heinrich – engineering (track 1), vocal engineering (track 1)
- John "Spud" Murphy – recording (tracks 1–8), engineering (tracks 1–8), mixing (tracks 2–8)
- Jamie Sprosen – additional engineering (tracks 2–8)
- Ian Chestnutt – recording (tracks 2–8), engineering (tracks 2–8, "Cruising")
- Harvey Birrell – mastering
- David Rudnick – design

== Charts ==
Chart performance for Cavalcade
Chart (2021)	Peak position
Australian Albums (ARIA)	81
Belgian Albums (Ultratop Flanders)	66
Belgian Albums (Ultratop Wallonia)	144
German Albums (Offizielle Top 100)	74
Scottish Albums (Official Charts)	18
UK Albums (Official Charts)	60
UK Independent Albums (Official Charts)	7
UK Rock & Metal Albums (Official Charts)	2
US Top Album Sales (Billboard)	16
