= 2022 UK Music Video Awards =

- Date: 27 October 2022
- Location: Magazine London, London
- Hosted by: Spencer Jones
- Most wins: Pharrell Williams, 21 Savage and Tyler, the Creator (4)
- Most nominations: FKA twigs (8)
- Website: www.ukmva.com

The 2022 UK Music Video Awards were held on 27 October 2022, at Magazine London in London and hosted by Spencer Jones, to recognise the best in music videos and music film making from United Kingdom and worldwide. This marks the first change in venue for the awards since the 2015 edition, from 2015 to 2021, the awards ceremony was held at the Roundhouse in London, with the exception of the virtual ceremony in 2020.

The nominations were announced on 28 September 2022, FKA twigs received the most nominations with eight, followed by The Weeknd, Obongjayar, Little Simz and black midi with six each. "Cash In Cash Out" by Pharrell Williams featuring 21 Savage and Tyler, the Creator received the most awards with four wins, including Video of the Year.

== Video of the Year ==
Video of the Year
- "Cash In Cash Out" – Pharrell Williams featuring 21 Savage and Tyler, the Creator
  (Director: François Rousselet)

== Video Genre Categories ==
Best Pop Video - UK	Best Pop Video - International
Harry Styles – "As It Was" (Director: Tanu Muino); George Ezra – "Green Green Grass" (Director: Isaac Ravishankara); Kylie Minogue & Jessie Ware – "Kiss of Life" (Directors: Sophie Muller & Theo Adams); Adele – "Oh My God" (Director: Sam Brown); The 1975 – "Part of the Band" (Director: Samuel Bradley); Arlo Parks – "Softly" (Director: Zhang & Knight)	Rosalía – "SAOKO" (Director: Valentin Petit); Lizzo – "About Damn Time" (Director: Christian Breslauer); Stromae – "Fils de joie" (Director: Henry Scholfield); Desirée Dawson – "Meet You at the Light" (Director: Alexander Farah); Tove Lo – "No One Dies from Love" (Director: Alaska); Lil Nas X – "Thats What I Want" (Director: STILLZ)
Best R&B/Soul Video - UK	Best R&B/Soul Video - International
Michael Kiwanuka – "Beautiful Life" (Director: Phillip Youmans); Joy Crookes – "19th Floor" (Director: Ebeneza Blanche); FKA twigs – "jealousy" (Director: Aidan Zamiri); Greentea Peng – "Look to Him" (Director: Felix Brady); Labrinth – "Mount Everest" (Director: Tanu Muino); FKA twigs featuring The Weeknd – "Tears in the Club" (Director: Amber Grace Johnson)	Omar Apollo featuring Daniel Caesar – "Invincible" (Director: STILLZ); IDK – "Breathe" (Director: Remi Besse); Lucky Daye featuring Lil Durk – "N.W.A." (Director: rubberband.); The Weeknd – "Out of Time" (Director: Cliqua); Steve Lacy – "Sunshine" (Director: rubberband.); Umi – "Wish That I Could" (Director: Danica Arias)
Best Dance/Electronic Video - UK	Best Dance/Electronic Video - International
Tourist – "Your Love" (Director: Duncan Loudon); Gorillaz featuring Thundercat – "Cracker Island" (Directors: Jamie Hewlett & FX Goby); Chase & Status – "Mixed Emotions" (Director: Femi Ladi); Franc Moody – "Raining in LA" (Directors: Will Hooper & Max McLachlan); Orbital – "Smiley" (Director: Luke Losey); Lewis Thompson featuring David Guetta – "Take Me Back" (Director: Taichi Kimura)	Arca – "Prada/Rakata" (Directors: Frederik Heyman & Arca); Meduza, James Carter featuring Elley Duhé & Fast Boy – "Bad Memories" (Director: Elliot Gonzo); Kavinsky – "Cameo" (Director: Filip Nilsson); DJ Snake – "Disco Maghreb" (Director: Elias Belkeddar); Flume featuring May-a – "Say Nothing" (Director: Michael Hili); Ásgeir – "Snowblind" (Director: Erlendur Sveinsson)
Best Rock Video - UK	Best Rock Video - International
Sam Fender – "Spit Of You" (Director: Philip Barantini); Foals – "2AM" (Director: Tanu Muino); Muse – "Compliance" (Director: Jeremi Durand); Idles – "Crawl!" (Directors: Loose & Edie Lawrence); Sam Fender – "Getting Started (Director's Cut)" (Director: Brock Neal-Roberts); Florence + the Machine – "King" (Director: Autumn de Wilde)	Pretty Sick – "Human Condition" (Director: Frank Lebon); The Lumineers – "Brightside" (Director: Kyle Thrash); Ezra Furman – "Forever in Sunset" (Director: Noel Paul); Imagine Dragons – "Sharks" (Director: Drew Kirsch); Måneskin – "Supermodel" (Director: Bedroom); The Black Keys – "Wild Child" (Director: Bryan Schlam)
Best Alternative Video - UK	Best Alternative Video - International
Radiohead – "If You Say the Word" (Director: Kasper Häggström); Yard Act – "100% Endurance" (Director: James Slater); Bakar – "Build Me a Way" (Director: Fenn O'Meally); black midi – "Eat Men Eat" (Director: Maxim Kelly); Alt-J – "Hard Drive Gold" (Director: Newman-Wallace); black midi – "Sugar/Tzu" (Director: Noel Paul)	Jean-Michel Blais – "Passepied" (Director: Adrian Villagomez); MorMor – "Far Apart" (Director: Camille Summers-Valli); Joji – "Glimpse of Us" (Director: Dan Streit); Stephan Moccio – "Halston" (Director: Joao Retorta); GENER8ION x 070 Shake x Surkin – "Neo Surf" (Director: Romain Gavras); ZNTNDR – "Untitled Us" (Director: Jovan Todorovic)
Best Hip Hop/Grime/Rap Video - UK	Best Hip Hop/Grime/Rap Video - International
Little Simz featuring Obongjayar – "Point and Kill" (Director: Ebeneza Blanche); Jeshi – "3210" (Director: Will Dohrm); Jeshi – "Generation" (Director: Brock Neal-Roberts); Loyle Carner – "Hate" (Directors: Greg Hackett & Loyle Carner); Big Zuu featuring Jme & Novelist – "Offline" (Directors: Edem Wornoo & William Child); Dave – "Verdansk" (Directors: Nathan James Tettey & Dave)	Pharrell featuring 21 Savage & Tyler the Creator – "Cash In Cash Out" (Director: François Rousselet); Screw – "22" (Director: Bleu Desert); Doechii – "Crazy" (Director: C Prinz); Sopico – "Slide" (Director: Scotty Simper); Kendrick Lamar – "The Heart Part 5" (Directors: Dave Free & Kendrick Lamar); Residente featuring Ibeyi – "This Is Not America" (Director: Gregory Ohrel)
Best Pop Video - Newcomer	Best R&B/Soul Video - Newcomer
Cavetown x beabadoobee – "Fall in Love with a Girl" (Director: Chris Fowles); Flowerovlove – "I Love This Song" (Director: Amitybloc); Taura Lamb – "Love Song" (Directors: Taura Lamb & Will Warr); Empress Of – "Save Me" (Director: Alexis Gómez); Mads Langer – "Ukendt land" (Director: Bertil Vorre); Sad Night Dynamite – "What Does That Make Me" (Director: Jocelyn Anquetil)	Khazali – "Better with the Devil" (Director: Freddie Wright); Lava La Rue – "High Fidelity" (Director: Paul Herrmann); Sipho – "I Don't Get It" (Director: Edem Wornoo); Nightmares On Wax – "Isolated" (Directors: Tolu Coker & Ade Coker); Ivy Sole – "Talk That Talk" (Director: Juh Almeida); Murkage Dave – "Us Lot" (Director: Ricky Gibb)
Best Dance/Electronic Video - Newcomer	Best Rock Video - Newcomer
Ross from Friends – "The Daisy" (Director: Rudá Santos); Cheap Electric Pink Wool – "01G" (Directors: Tom & Theo); Confidence Man – "Feels Like a Different Thing" (Director: W.A.M. Bleakley); Duvall featuring Sam Gray – "Good Feeling" (Director: rICKY gIBB); David Lindmer featuring Johanson – "Omen" (Director: Drust); Adibanti – "One Door Closes" (Director: Fabricio Rodrigues)	La Jungle – "Du Sang du Singe" (Director: Alex Orma); Didirri – "Begin Again" (Director: W.A.M. Bleakley); Wu-Lu – "Blame" (Director: Denisha Anderson); Cafuné – "Tek It" (Director: Crux); Wet Leg – "Ur Mum" (Director: Lava La Rue); Wet Leg – "Wet Dream" (Director: Wet Leg)
Best Alternative Video - Newcomer	Best Hip Hop/Grime/Rap Video - Newcomer
Nick Leng – "Morning / Midnight" (Director: Josh Sondock); Baby Dave – "Clarence's Dead Dad" (Director: Kris R); Arssalendo – "Quattro Pareti" (Director: Giada Bossi); ALASKALASKA – "Still Life" (Director: Jacek Zmarz); Nother – "Us" (Director: Marco Santi); Marina Satti – "Yiati Pouli M'" (Director: Alexis Gómez)	Wu-Lu – "Ten" (Directors: Ethan & Tom); Bxks featuring Oscar Worldpeace – "321" (Director: Jay Green); Fly Anakin – "Class Clown" (Director: Jay Green); Flohio – "Cuddy Buddy" (Director: Petr Simon); Rodney Chrome – "To the Money" (Director: Zac Dov Wiesel); AntsLive – "Tweakin" (Director: Tom Emmerson)

== Technical and Craft Categories ==
Best Performance in a Video	Best Production Design in a Video
Loyle Carner – "Hate" (Performer: Loyle Carner); Yard Act – "100% Endurance" (Performer: David Thewlis); Belief – "Dreams" (Performer: Mark Crawley); Arssalendo – "Quattro Pareti" (Performers: Arssalendo & Giulio Vaccaro); Lil Nas X – "That's What I Want" (Performer: Lil Nas X); Kendrick Lamar – "The Heart Part 5" (Performer: Kendrick Lamar)	Thom Draft – "Breathtaking" (Production Designer: Sandra Sasportas); Hikaru Utada – "Bad Mode" (Production Designer: Luke Moran-Morris); Angèle – "Bruxelles je t'aime" (Production Designer: Julija Fricsone Gavriss); Tove Lo – "No One Dies from Love" (Production Designer: Pedro "Bolo" Catellani); Adele – "Oh My God" (Production Designer: Nu California); Arlo Parks – "Softly" (Production Designer: Oian Arteta)
Best Wardrobe Styling in a Video	Best Hair & Make-up in a Video
Little Simz featuring Obongjayar – "Point and Kill" (Cast Stylist: Temitope Uduak Betiku; Artist Stylist: Ashley Okoli); Stromae – "Fils de joie" (Stylists: Coralie Barbier, Sonia Boccara, Muriel Dantard); Kylie Minogue & Jessie Ware – "Kiss of Life" (Kylie Minogue and Cast Stylist: Ed Marler; Jessie Ware Stylist: Nell Kalonji); Sin Bandera – "Nadie" (Stylist: Sol Canievsky); Sampa the Great – "Never Forget" (Stylist: Neesha Tulsi Champaneria); FKA twigs featuring The Weeknd – "Tears in the Club" (Stylist: Peri Rosenzweig; Wardrobe: Matthew Josephs, Matthew Henson)	Gloria Groove – "A Queda" (Make-up artists: Gloria Groove, Victor Nogueira, Alma Negrot; Hair stylists: Kelly Karamello, Alma Negrot, Stefany Silva); Priyanka featuring Lemon – "Come Through" (Make-up Artist: Viktor Peters; Hair Stylist: Kirsten Klontz); Sin Bandera – "Nadie" (Make-up Artist, VFX & Prosthetics: Identikit Facemakers by Mariangeles Caparelli; Hair Stylist: Mariangeles Caparelli); Sudan Archives – "NBPQ (Topless)" (Make-up Artist & Hair Stylist: Alice Dodds); Little Simz featuring Obongjayar – "Point and Kill" (Make-up Artist: Ayopo Abiri; Hair Stylist: Kahinde Aare); FKA twigs featuring The Weeknd – "Tears in the Club" (Make-up Artists: Kabuki, Shea Hardy, Christine Nelli; Hair Stylists: Malcom Marquez, Daronn Carr)
Best Choreography in a Video	Best Cinematography in a Video
Doechii – "Crazy" (Choreographer: Tyrik Patterson); Florence + the Machine – "Heaven is Here" (Choreographer: Ryan Heffington); FKA twigs – "Ride the Dragon" (Choreographer: Kash Powell); FKA twigs featuring The Weeknd – "Tears in the Club" (Choreographer: Sean Bankhead); Jean-Michel Blais – "Passepied" (Choreographer: Lauri-Ann Lauzon); Alt-J – "The Actor" (Choreographers: Saskia Dixie, Hannah Mason, Lewis Walker)	black midi – "Sugar/Tzu" (Director of Photography: Jake Scott); Taylor Swift – All Too Well: The Short Film (Director of Photography: Nina Yang); Doechii – "Crazy" (Director of Photography: Nika Altskan); Sin Bandera – "Nadie" (Director of Photography: Marcos Hastrup); Little Simz featuring Obongjayar – "Point and Kill" (Director of Photography: Sam Meyer); ZNTNDR – "Untitled Us" (Director of Photography: Oliver Millar)
Best Colour Grading in a Video	Best Editing in a Video
Little Simz featuring Obongjayar – "Point and Kill" (Colourist: Jason Wallis at Electric Theatre Collective); Ethan P Flynn – "Distraught" (Colourist: Connor Coolbear at Electric Theatre Collective); Sam Fender – "Get You Down" (Colourist: Jason Wallis at Electric Theatre Collective); Greentea Peng – "Look to Him" (Colourist: Alex Gregory at No.8 London); M83 – "My Tears Are Becoming a Sea" (Colourist: Arthur Paux at Monumental FX); Ásgeir – "Snowblind" (Colourist: Marina Starke)	Joji – "Glimpse of Us" (Editor: Dan Streit); black midi – "Eat Men Eat" (Editor: Vid Price at Trim Editing); Bourne – "Ere We Go" (Editor: Simon Colin at Firm Studio); black midi – "Sugar/Tzu" (Editor: Noel Paul); FKA twigs featuring The Weeknd – "Tears in the Club" (Editor: Chiao Chen at Forager / Dave Davis at Trim Editing); Chase & Status – "When It Rains" (Editor: Rich Woolway at Stitch)
Best Visual Effects in a Video	Best Animation in a Video
Pharrell featuring 21 Savage & Tyler the Creator – "Cash In Cash Out" (VFX Supervisors: Greg McKneally, Iain Murray, Alex Snookes, David Filipe, Tobin Brett, James Sindle, Fabrice Fiteni, Andras Ormos at Electric Theatre Collective); Ed Sheeran featuring Lil Baby – "2step" (VFX Lead: Jim Allen at No.8 London); Kendrick Lamar – "The Heart Part 5" (VFX Artists: Frank Agnone, Ivy Agregan, Tomas Hajka, Chris Kenny, Jeff White, James Southgate, Paul Shales, Frank Lucatuorto at Deep Voodoo); Gorillaz featuring Thundercat – "Cracker Island" (Lead VFX Artists: Dave Hunt, Florian Caspar, Germán Díez); Arca – "Prada/Rakata" (VFX Artist: Frederik Heyman); Orelsan featuring Skread – "Ensemble" (VFX Artists: Anthony Lestremau, Julien Missaire, Vitaliy Havrylyuk, Bruno Dias, Alexi Baillia, Alexandre Renet at La Pac)	Pharrell featuring 21 Savage & Tyler the Creator – "Cash In Cash Out" (VFX Supervisors: Greg McKneally, Iain Murray, Alex Snookes, David Filipe, Tobin Brett, James Sindle at Electric Theatre Collective; Lead Animators: Fabrice Fiteni, Andras Ormos); Mac Miller – "Colors and Shapes" (Animator: Sam Mason); Idles – "Crawl!" (Animators: Edie Lawrence, Jordan Chappell); Odesza – "Light of Day" (Animator: Balazs Simon); Orelsan – "The Quest" (Animators: Victor Haegelin, Hugo Cierzniak); black midi – "Welcome to Hell" (Animators: Gustaf Holtenäs, Sevi Iko Dømochevsky, Noha Manfredi, Joel Arizona Widerberg, Valeria Baret)

== Special Video Categories ==
Best Live Video	Best Special Video Project
Obongjayar – "I Wish It Was Me" (Director: Hector Aponysus); Aurora – "A Touch of the Divine" (Director: Alexandra Green); Dijon – "Annie" (Director: Jack Karaszewski); Fontaines D.C. – "Jackie Down the Line (The Tonight Show starring Jimmy Fallon)" (Director: Hugh Mulhern); Stromae – "Santé" (Director: Julien Soulier); Koffee – "Where I'm From (Vevo LIFT Live Session)" (Directors: Jim Wilmot & Charlie Sarsfield)	Sad Night Dynamite – Volume II Mix Tape (Director: Lucas Hrubizna); Moses Sumney – Blackalachia (Director: Moses Sumney); FKA twigs – Caprisongs (Director: Aidan Zamiri); Dream Diver – Dream Diver (Director: Jonas Bang); Lykke Li – EYEYE (Director: Theo Lindquist); Little Simz – "I Love You, I Hate You" (Director: Sam Pilling)

== Individual and Company Categories ==
Best Director	Best New Director
Tanu Muino; Aidan Zamiri; Arnaud Bresson; Duncan Loudon; Henry Scholfield; Valentin Petit	STILLZ; Bleu Desert; C Prinz; Ebeneza Blanche; Edem Wornoo; Giada Bossi
Best Director of Photography	Best Producer
Christopher Ripley; Harry Wheeler; Jaime Ackroyd; Jake Gabbay; Nikita Kuzmenko; Patrick Golan	Jules de Chateleux; Aaron Z Willson; Alex Chamberlain; Elizabeth Doonan; Fred Bonham Carter; Mayling Wong
Best Production Company	Best Commissioner
DIVISION; COMPULSORY; Iconoclast; Object & Animal; SMUGGLER; UnderWonder Content	John Moule; Connie Meade; Kim Jarrett; Louis Danckwerts; Michael Lewin; Scott Wright
Best Agent	Outstanding Achievement Award
Alexa Haywood, FreeAgent; André Reid-McKinley, Somesuch; Carrie Sutton; Claire Stubbs & Connie Meade, Mouthpiece; Joceline Gabriel & Sarah Boardman, HANDS; Sam Davey & Polly Millner, OB Management	Dan Curwin
