= Schlagenheim =

Studio album by Black Midi
- Released: 21 June 2019
- Recorded: November 2018 (Note: Except "bmbmbm", recorded prior to May 2018)
- Studio: Speedy Wunderground studio
- Genres: Math rock; experimental rock; noise rock
- Length: 43:15
- Label: Rough Trade
- Producer: Dan Carey

Black Midi chronology
| Schlagenheim (2019) | Black Midi Live in the USA (2020) |

Singles from Schlagenheim
- 1. "bmbmbm" Released: 30 May 2018; 2. "Speedway" Released: 31 January 2019; 3. "Ducter" Released: 20 June 2019

Schlagenheim is the debut studio album by the English experimental rock band Black Midi, released on 21 June 2019 through Rough Trade Records. Produced by Dan Carey, the album was recorded over five days at Speedy Wunderground studio in November 2018, and developed from extended jam sessions refined into structured compositions. The songs were developed from extended improvisations with Carey expanding the arrangements through the use of piano, accordion, synthesisers, and drum machines, aiming to create unusual textures and sounds that could not easily be reproduced in a live performance. It is the band's only studio album to feature founding guitarist Matt Kwasniewski-Kelvin, who departed from the band in 2020.

Musically, it is categorised as a math rock, experimental rock, and noise rock album. Its sound is marked by complex time signatures, dense instrumental layering, and abrupt shifts in tempo and dynamics. The lyrics are largely abstract, surreal, and esoteric, with several songs set in a fictional world also named "Schlagenheim". Upon release, Schlagenheim received widespread critical acclaim, with reviewers praising the band's technical proficiency, inventive songwriting, and unpredictability. It was shortlisted for the 2019 Mercury Prize and appeared on multiple publications' year-end lists of the best albums of 2019. Commercially, the album charted at number 113 on the Belgian Albums Chart, number 43 on the UK Albums Chart, number 41 on the US Independent Albums chart, and number 40 on the Scottish Albums Chart.

== Background ==
Black Midi was formed in London in 2017 by Geordie Greep (vocals, guitar), Matt Kwasniewski-Kelvin (vocals, guitar), Cameron Picton (vocals, bass), and Morgan Simpson (drums). Greep and Kwasniewski-Kelvin initially worked on extended ambient improvisations before Simpson joined, after which the group's sound shifted towards more structured compositions. Picton was the final addition, joining the band on the morning of their first live performance. The name of the band itself is taken from the niche internet music style known as black MIDI, which involves creating dense compositions consisting a large number of MIDI notes. Greep selected the name after encountering it online, later noting that he was drawn to its visual quality rather than its musical association. All four members met while studying at the BRIT School for Performing Arts and Technology in Croydon, a school known for producing commercially successful artists such as Adele, Amy Winehouse, and Jessie J. There, Greep and Simpson developed improvisational skills through church music. The group used the school's rehearsal facilities to develop their material, with their first public performance taking place during their final appearance at the institution.

The band first gained attention through live performances in London, particularly at the Windmill venue in Brixton, which was the only location to respond after Greep contacted several others. The venue's booker, Tim Perry, became an early supporter of the group, providing opportunities to perform and refine material. Their reputation was further enhanced when the band Shame, also associated with the venue, described Black Midi as the "best band in London". A video of their January 2018 performance for KEXP-FM in Reykjavík, Iceland was uploaded online and became a catalyst for broader attention, generating significant interest despite the band having released only a limited number of tracks at the time. The group subsequently signed to Rough Trade Records in January 2019. Their reputation was bolstered by a deliberate lack of online presence and limited press engagement, which led to the perception of the group as enigmatic.

== Recording and production ==
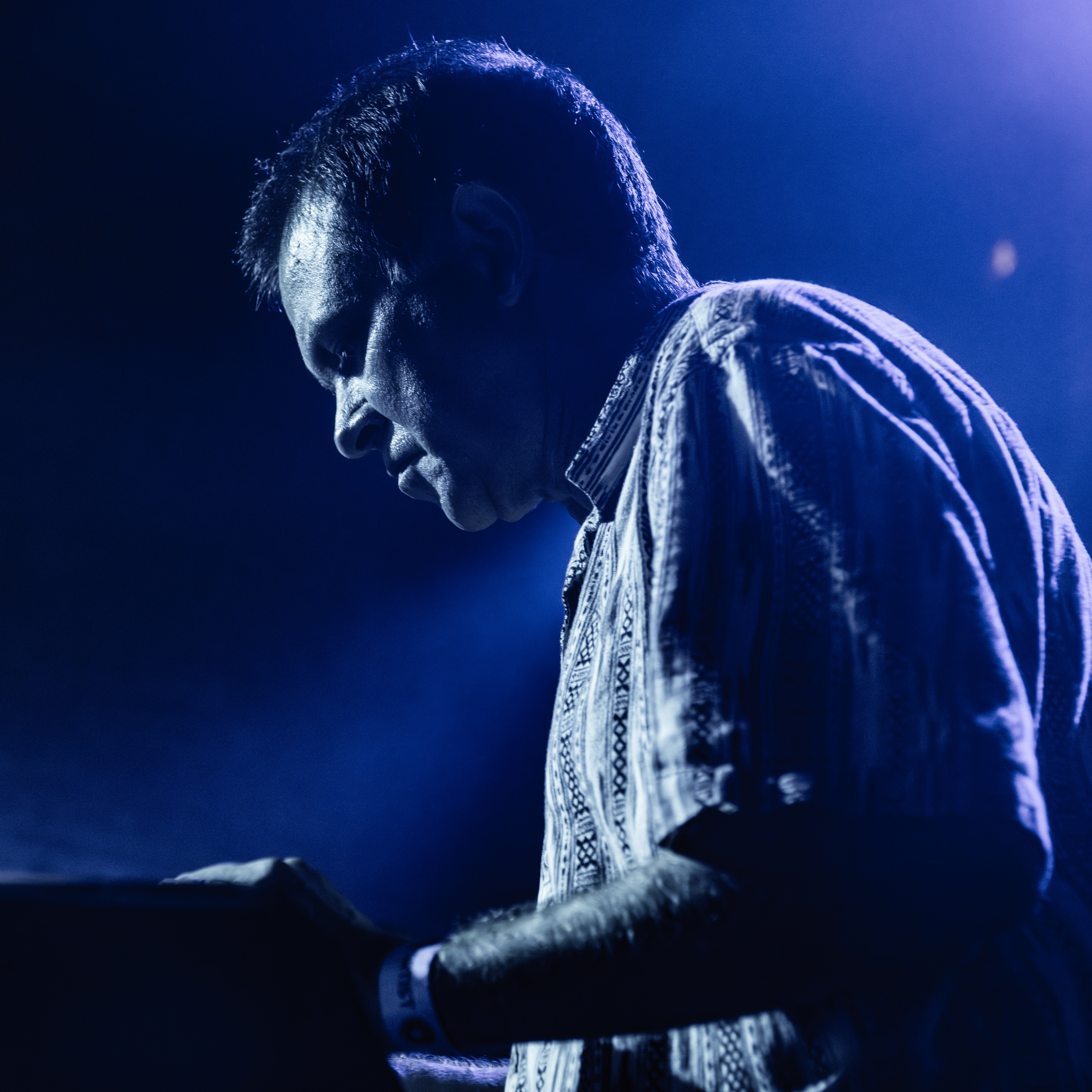
Schlagenheim was produced by Dan Carey

Schlagenheim was produced by Dan Carey, who had previously worked with artists and bands including Kae Tempest, Bat for Lashes and Bloc Party. Carey first saw the band perform during the opening night of their Windmill residency and expressed interest in recording them soon afterward. The sessions for the album took place at Carey's Speedy Wunderground studio. The album was recorded during sessions in November 2018, from which the non-album track "Sweater" also originated. It took place over a five-day period, during which eight of the nine tracks were completed. The songs were developed from extended jam sessions, often lasting several hours, from which individual riffs or motifs were extracted and refined into full songs.

Although early coverage of the group emphasized improvisation, the band clarified that the album was carefully assembled from material generated during these sessions rather than recorded spontaneously. Guitarist Geordie Greep described the method as one of continuous experimentation, deliberately pushing into unfamiliar styles and producing originality through failure or distortion. The band has expressed an intention to avoid repetition, with Greep noting that continuing to write in the same style would lead them to "quit the band".

Carey deliberately expanded the album's sonic palette with additional instruments and production techniques intended to create textures that could not be replicated in live performance, including piano, accordion, synthesisers, and drum machines. He employed a "no-nonsense" production style, according to Joe Goggins of Loud and Quiet, encouraging experimentation while retaining clarity, with the final sound characterized as dry, dynamic, and alternately chaotic and restrained. The title Schlagenheim is stated to be a non-word invented by the band. It has been interpreted as a German expression meaning "hit home", derived from a fictional setting created by Greep, with several songs described as taking place in this imagined world. Before settling on the title, Greep wanted to call the album Hellfire, which ultimately became the name of their third studio album.

== Composition ==
=== Overview ===
Schlagenheim is a math rock, experimental rock, and noise rock record with additional elements and influences including post-punk, progressive rock, post-rock, speed metal, avant-garde jazz, no wave, krautrock, and screamo. The album consists of nine tracks with a total running time of 43 minutes. Simpson's drumming has been described as central to the band's sound, providing both technical precision and unpredictable energy. The music makes use of complex and irregular time signatures, dense instrumental layering, and rapid changes in direction. Guitarists Greep and Kwasniewski-Kelvin employ erratic, staccato riffs and intricate melodies, while Picton's bass provides both harmonic foundation and rhythmic propulsion.

The lyrics on Schlagenheim are generally abstract, surreal, or esoteric, with many songs set within a fictional world also named Schlagenheim. Greep often writes fictional narratives rather than personal accounts. his vocal delivery ranges from spoken passages and whispered narration to yelps, snarls, and shouts, and has been described as unconventional and divisive, drawing occasional comparisons to Mark E. Smith of the Fall and Les Claypool of Primus. In 2022, Simpson debunked an often-repeated rumour that the album's songs stemmed from spontaneous jam sessions: "I think there was this idea in people's heads when we came to record the first record that it took us the same amount of time to write the actual song itself that it did to record it. That just was never true".

=== Songs ===
The opening track "953" establishes the album's intense and unpredictable tone. It begins with sharp, aggressive guitar riffs and driving percussion, featuring complex time signatures such as an initial 5/8 riff. The composition alternates between high-energy sections and slower, quieter passages, incorporating finger-picked guitar, and ambient noise. Greep's vocals vary between calm delivery and explosive shouts, creating a sense of tension and release throughout the track. "Speedway" emphasizes a guitar-and-drum groove with a comparatively restrained structure. The track is built on staccato guitar lines and oscillating electronic percussion, drawing comparisons to early Talking Heads and Ought. Picton provides lead vocals in a monotone delivery, with lyrics referencing urban issues and imagery such as "dog shit park" and new cities, juxtaposing civic neglect against future possibilities. The track includes Greep's brief vocal interjection of "Honey!". Instrumentally, the piece gradually intensifies, culminating in a noise guitar eruption that frequently withdraws before resolution, illustrating tension and anticipation within the arrangement. Although the title "Reggae" suggests a reggae influence, the track subverts the genre, incorporating only minimal dub elements alongside math-rock and noise sections. Greep delivers aggressive, snarling vocals over jittering, juddering guitar riffs from Kwasniewski-Kelvin. Simpson's drumming remains precise and complex throughout.

At under three minutes, "Near DT, MI" is a concentrated expression of the band's technical and political concerns. Picton sings lead vocals addressing the Flint water crisis, repeating lines such as "There's lead in the water, there's lead in the water/there's lead in the water and you think that I'm fine?". Musically, the track combines noisy math-rock passages with D-beat rhythms, featuring linear crescendos and abrupt shifts that heighten tension within a concise framework. The eight-minute track "Western" is structured around multiple contrasting sections. It begins with pastoral finger-picked guitar passages and subdued percussion, evoking a ballad-like atmosphere. Midway, the track transitions to avant-funk and freeform guitar passages with Frippertronic influences and references to Talking Heads–style rhythms. Greep alternates between whispered lines and delirious wails. The lyrics include surreal sequences, such as: "A pink caterpillar with six anorexic children let me stay/But I had to keep moving through anteater town/ After anteater town after anteater town after anteater town after anteater town..." The title track "Of Schlagenheim" opens with a drone before transitioning into chaotic, erratic passages. Time signatures fluctuate throughout, combining aggressive post-punk rhythms with sudden melodic interludes. Greep's vocals shift from nasal wails to high-intensity outbursts, including "clownish yelps".

"bmbmbm", the band's debut single, is built on a repetitive, one-note bass riff over a no-wave influenced stomp rhythm. The track is characterized by jagged, industrial textures and propulsive percussion. Greep's vocals alternate between yelps and whispered variations on the phrase "She moves with a purpose" in a succession of different voices, adopting a character whose obsessive gaze objectifies the woman he describes. A warped vocal sample of a wailing woman appears in the album version, replacing an earlier sample from Big Brother contestant Nikki Grahame. "Years Ago" is a brief, densely layered track featuring rapid rhythmic shifts, motorik grooves, and sudden bursts of noise. Guitar and percussion interact with polyrhythmic piano lines, while Kwasniewski-Kelvin's vocal splutters punctuate the composition. The closing track, "Ducter", is structured around a narrative of a therapy session. Greep assumes the perspective of the patient, with lyrics including: "He laid out his theories, every one that he got… every quote just eats itself with a different perspective" and "diagnose if you wish, but please first take your hands off your dick". The composition features irregular rhythms, abrupt tempo shifts, and a climactic noise section. Greep employs extended vocal techniques, alternating between Robert Plant-like wails, Gollum-style chant, and babytalk phrases such as "goo-goo-goos". The track concludes with layered instrumentation and demented vocal exclamations, emphasizing improvisation and dynamic intensity.

== Release and promotion ==
Schlagenheim was released on 21 June 2019 through Rough Trade Records. Its cover art was designed by visual artist David Rudnick. Two singles preceded the album; "bmbmbm", released on 30 May 2018 through Speedy Wunderground, was the band's first official release, issued on a small run of vinyl and shared online. "Speedway" followed on 31 January 2019 as a Rough Trade release, distributed as a tour-only 12-inch with remixes rather than through streaming services. On 20 June 2019, black midi released the track "Ducter" accompanied by an animated music video directed by Anthrox Studio. The "Crow's Perch" single was released on 26 March. The album's announcement was made on 14 May 2019 at a last-minute show in north-east London, tickets for which were distributed through a private email link, with the single "Talking Heads" released on 17 May 2019. In keeping with the group's preference for secrecy, the track listing of Schlagenheim was withheld until the release date, with Rough Trade requesting that advance recipients not reveal it publicly.

The release was accompanied by extensive touring across the United Kingdom, Europe, North America, and Japan. In London, the group played a major show at EartH Hackney on 18 June 2019. Their itinerary also included performances at South by Southwest in Austin, Texas, in March 2019, and at the Pitchfork Music Festival held on 21 July in Chicago. In July, the album was shortlisted for the Mercury Prize. In September 2019, black midi released the individual instrument tracks for all nine songs on their website, inviting fans to create remixes, though stipulating that they could not be sold or used commercially.

== Critical reception ==
Professional ratings
Aggregate scores
| Source | Rating |
|---|---|
| AnyDecentMusic? | 7.8/10 |
| Metacritic | 82/100 |
Review scores
| Source | Rating |
| AllMusic | 4/5 stars |
| Financial Times | 4/5 stars |
| The Guardian | 3/5 stars |
| Mojo | 4/5 stars |
| NME | 4/5 stars |
| Paste | 9.3/10 |
| Pitchfork | 8.2/10 |
| Q | 4/5 stars |
| Rolling Stone | 4/5 stars |
| Uncut | 8/10 |

Schlagenheim has received acclaim from critics. At Metacritic, which assigns a weighted average rating out of 100 to reviews from mainstream critics, Schlagenheim received a rating of 82 out of 100 based on twenty critic reviews, indicating "universal acclaim". Similarly, on AnyDecentMusic?, it received a rating of 7.8 out of 10, based on twenty three reviews.

Jeremy D. Larson of Pitchfork awarded Schlagenheim a "Best New Music" distinction, describing it as "twitchy, hair-raising, always on the move", and praising the band's ability to create music that "screws in deep and rewires the synapses". In a positive review for Paste, Steven Edelstone described Greep and Kwasniewski-Kelvin as "two of our most inventive contemporary guitarists" and noted that one of the album's few shortcomings was its limited emphasis on Morgan Simpson's drumming. He praised Schlagenheim for its unpredictability and compared it to Trout Mask Replica, concluding that it was "one of the best albums [he had] ever heard" and "a masterpiece".

Joshua Copperman of PopMatters argued that while Black Midi's talent "exceeds the hype", the band often came across as emotionally shallow. Citing "Of Schlagenheim" as an example of ideas that undermined one another, he described the album as both the most promising and most exasperating release of 2019. Paul Glynn of the BBC claimed that the album "has been described by critics as everything from thrilling to frustrating."

In a mixed review for The Guardian, Alexis Petridis highlighted the band's technical skill, noting their ability to create grooves that were "hypnotically repetitious while constantly shifting and changing." However, he criticized their "po-faced seriousness" and sense of self-satisfaction. Petridis concluded that Schlagenheim was "an imperfect, intriguing debut" that, despite its flaws, suggested the band would be worth following. Schlagenheim was praised for the technical proficiency of the musicianship, with Paste, Pitchfork, and The Quietus singling out Simpson's drumming as especially good.

=== Year-end rankings ===
| Publication | Accolade | Rank | Ref. |
|---|---|---|---|
| Afisha Daily (Russia) | The Best Foreign Albums of 2019 | 19 | |
| Clash | Albums of the Year 2019 | 5 | |
| The Guardian | The 50 Best Albums of 2019 | 38 | |
| Mojo | 75 Best Albums of 2019 | 8 | |
| musicOMH | Top 50 Albums of 2019 | 8 | |
| The New York Times | Best Albums of 2019 | 9 | |
| Paste | The 50 Best Albums of 2019 | 11 | |
| PopMatters | 70 Best Albums of 2019 | 64 | |
| The Quietus | Albums of the Year 2019 | 7 | |
| Spin | 10 Best Albums of 2019 | 9 | |
| Sputnikmusic | Top 50 Albums of 2019 | 36 | |
| Stereogum | The 50 Best Albums of 2019 | 11 | |
| Under the Radar | Top 100 Albums of 2019 | 30 | |

== Track listing ==
Schlagenheim – standard edition
| No. | Title | Length |
|---|---|---|
| 1. | "953" | 5:20 |
| 2. | "Speedway" | 3:18 |
| 3. | "Reggae" | 3:30 |
| 4. | "Near DT, MI" | 2:20 |
| 5. | "Western" | 8:08 |
| 6. | "Of Schlagenheim" | 6:26 |
| 7. | "bmbmbm" | 4:56 |
| 8. | "Years Ago" | 2:35 |
| 9. | "Ducter" | 6:42 |
| Total length: | | 43:15 |

YouTube release bonus track
| No. | Title | Length |
|---|---|---|
| 10. | "7-Eleven" | 4:54 |
| Total length: | | 48:09 |

Japanese bonus tracks
| No. | Title | Length |
|---|---|---|
| 10. | "Talking Heads" | 3:05 |
| 11. | "Crow's Perch" | 4:04 |
| Total length: | | 50:24 |

== Personnel ==
Sourced from the album's liner notes and AllMusic.

Black Midi

- Geordie Greep – vocals (tracks 1, 3, 5, 6, 7, 9), Reverend Descent Baritone guitar (tracks 1–4, 5 (ending), 6–9), Gretsch Spectrasonic Baritone guitar (tracks 5, 7)
- Matt Kwasniewski-Kelvin – vocals (track 8), 1996 Fender Mustang guitar (track 1), Fender Telecaster guitar (tracks 2, 5–7, 9), Fender Thinline Telecaster guitar (tracks 3), Supro Val Trol guitar (tracks 4, 8), Gretsch Falcon guitar (track 5 ending)
- Cameron Picton – vocals (tracks 2, 4), Gretsch White Falcon bass (tracks 1, 2, 4), Eastwood Sidejack Bass 32 (tracks 2, 7, 9), Fender Jazz bass (tracks 3, 8), Gibson EB 2 bass (track 5), Rickenbacker 4003 bass (track 5 (ending)) Fender Mustang bass (track 6)
- Morgan Simpson – Rogers drum set, Meinl cymbals; Ludwig Black Beauty snare drum (tracks 1, 5, 6, 8), Craviotto Timeless Timber snare drum (tracks 2–4, 7, 9)
- Katie Sherrard – additional vocals (track 7)
- "Overdubs" – Rickenbacker 4003 Bass 50p (tracks 1, 2), Fender Telecaster, Fender Mustang (track 1), nylon acoustic guitar (tracks 1, 8), modular synth (tracks 1, 6–9), Swarmatron (tracks 1, 7), Nashville Strung Electric Guitar (tracks 1–3), tambourine (tracks 2, 6), finger cymbals, guiro, bongos, Wah-wah guitar, bells (tracks 2), Kawai Upright Piano (tracks 2–5, 8), Russian guitar (tracks 2, 4), tack tom, Fender Mustang Bass (3), Buchla Music Easel, Dave Smith Prophet 2 (tracks 3, 9), Gibson Kalamazoo (tracks 3, 6), Deckard's Dream (tracks 3, 4, 6), Mellotron (tracks 3, 4, 9), Roland Jupiter 8 (3, 4, 6), MPC X, clavioline (track 4) Simon & Patrick Acoustic Guitar, flute, guitarron bass guitar, banjo, bin lid, cowbell, Wood blocks, spring, shaker, tambo, triangle, Nashville Strung Acoustic Guitar (track 5), Fratelli Crosio Chromatic Accordion, pedal steel (tracks 5, 6), Nashville Springing, Gretsch Black Falcon, claps, giant spring, Fender Rhodes (6), MPC X with Buchla samples, Rickenbacker 360, shouts (track 8), Supro Val Trol, rain stick, castanets, Roland System 100, Roland SP 404 (track 9)

Production

- Dan Carey – production
- Alexis Smith – engineering
- Christian Wright – mastering
- David Rudnick – artwork

== Charts ==
| Chart (2019) | Peak position |
|---|---|
| Belgian Albums (Ultratop Flanders) | 113 |
| Scottish Albums (Official Charts) | 40 |
| UK Albums (Official Charts) | 43 |
| US Independent Albums (Billboard) | 41 |
