= Black Midi =

English rock band

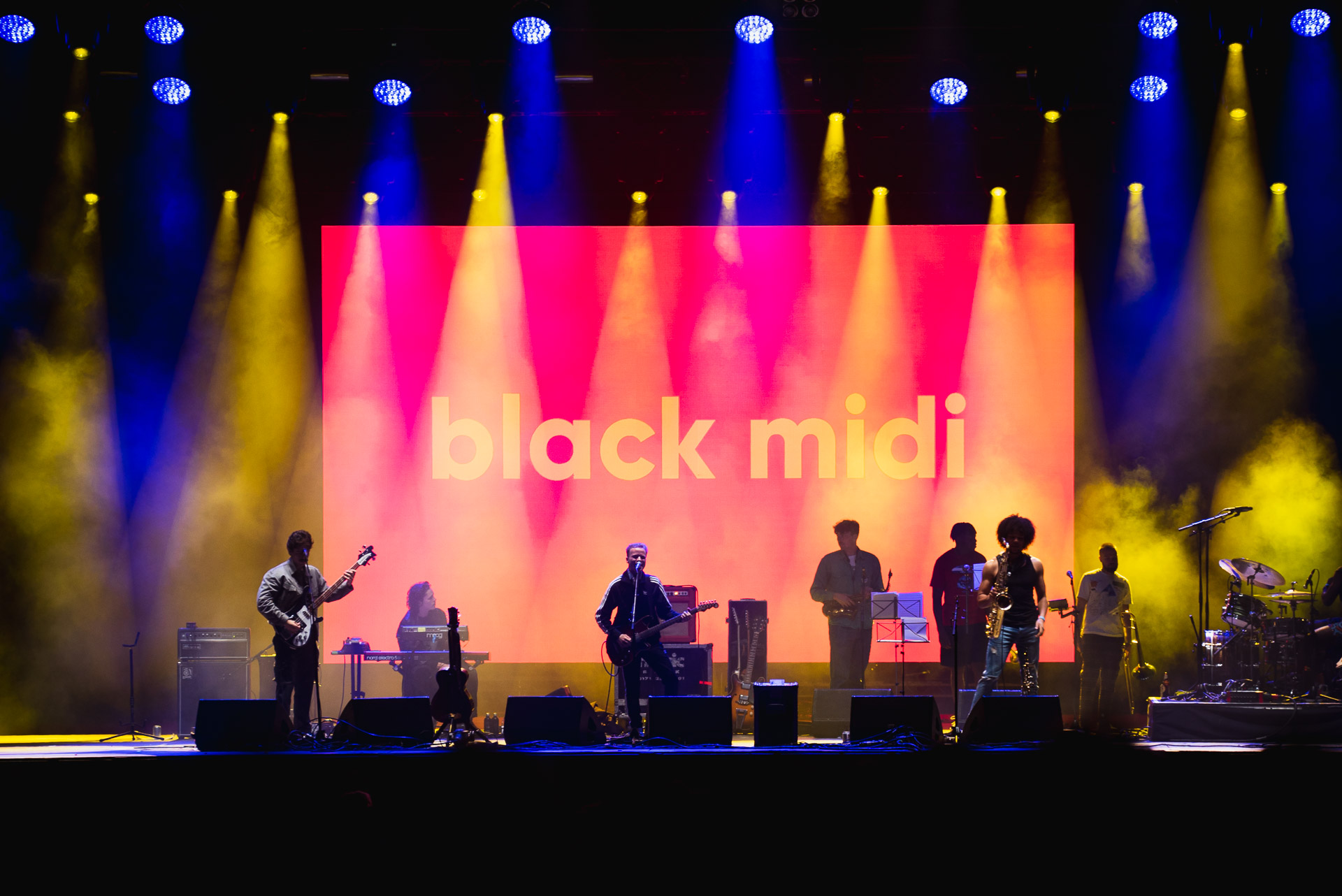
- Black Midi performing at Wide Awake Festival 2021

Background information
- Origin: London, England, UK
- Genres: Experimental rock; math rock; art rock; avant-prog; post-punk; progressive rock; brutal prog; jazz fusion; noise rock (early)
- Years active: 2017–2024 (Note: On an indefinite hiatus)
- Labels: Rough Trade; Speedy Wunderground
- Spinoffs: Black Midi, New Road; My New Band Believe
- Past members: Geordie Greep; Matt Kwasniewski-Kelvin; Morgan Simpson; Cameron Picton
- Website: bmblackmidi.com

Black Midi (stylised as black midi) were an English experimental rock band from London that formed in 2017. Their most recent line-up consisted of lead vocalists and multi-instrumentalists Geordie Greep and Cameron Picton, along with drummer Morgan Simpson. Between 2017 and 2021, the band also included guitarist Matt Kwasniewski-Kelvin. Following his departure, the trio were frequently joined by multi-instrumentalist Seth Evans and saxophonist Kaidi Akinnibi, both as session musicians and during live performances. Their name is derived from the Japanese electronic music genre black MIDI, though their own music has no obvious relation to it, instead incorporating styles such as math rock, progressive rock, post-punk, and avant-jazz.

Part of the Windmill scene, the band began on producer Dan Carey's record label Speedy Wunderground, through which they released their debut single, "bmbmbm", in 2018. They released their debut studio album, Schlagenheim, produced by Carey, on 21 June 2019, through Rough Trade Records. It received critical acclaim, entered the top 50 of the UK Albums Chart, and was nominated for the 2019 Mercury Prize. An anthology album including several recorded jams and spoken-word tracks, The Black Midi Anthology Vol. 1: Tales of Suspense and Revenge, was released on 5 June 2020 exclusively to Bandcamp. In January 2021, founding member Matt Kwasniewski-Kelvin went on hiatus from the group for mental health reasons. The band's second studio album, Cavalcade, was released on 26 May 2021. Their third studio album, Hellfire, was released on 15 July 2022.

The band entered an indefinite hiatus in August 2024, as each member focused on other work; Greep released his solo album The New Sound, Picton formed a new group, My New Band Believe (who released their self-titled debut studio album in 2026), and Simpson began working with jazz musician Nala Sinephro and rapper Little Simz, appearing on their albums Endlessness (2024) and Lotus (2025) respectively. Kwasniewski-Kelvin died by suicide in January 2026.

== History ==
=== 2015–2019: Formation and first singles ===
Prior to the formation of the band, Geordie Greep had separate jam sessions with Matt Kwasniewski-Kelvin and Morgan Simpson, all of whom (alongside Cameron Picton) were attending BRIT School. Simpson was an accomplished drummer, coming from a Jamaican musical family and winning the "Young Drummer of the Year" award in 2014. In 2016 Greep and Kwasniewski-Kelvin enlisted Simpson to form a band, with Greep and Kwasniewski-Kelvin on guitar and vocals, and with Simpson on drums. Picton joined later, on bass guitar, to complete the line-up. The band played their first gig at Brixton's The Windmill on 12 June 2017, supporting the band Leg Puppy, and would go on to have a residency at the venue, becoming one of the Windmill scene's biggest exponents. In April 2018, NTS released a video of an off session at Flesh and Bone studios, which was the first video and original music release of the group. That session would later be formally released as "Talking Heads".

On 8 June 2018, the group released their debut single, titled "bmbmbm", on producer Dan Carey's record label Speedy Wunderground. On 26 September 2018, a cassette was released featuring segments of a performance with Damo Suzuki which took place on 5 May 2018 at The Windmill. On 9 November 2018, Black Midi performed five songs from their then untitled upcoming album, live at Kex Hostel in Reykjavík, Iceland, during the music festival Iceland Airwaves. The eccentric performance, which was recorded for the Seattle radio station KEXP, was praised online and became popular on YouTube, exposing the band to listeners internationally. The band contributed the song "Ice Cream" featuring Jerskin Fendrix on vocals for a Brixton Hillbilly compilation album, released 7 December 2018. On 23 January 2019, the group released their second single, "Speedway". A 12" vinyl record was released featuring remixes by Proc Fiskal, Kwake Bass, and Blanck Mass.

=== 2019–2020: Schlagenheim ===
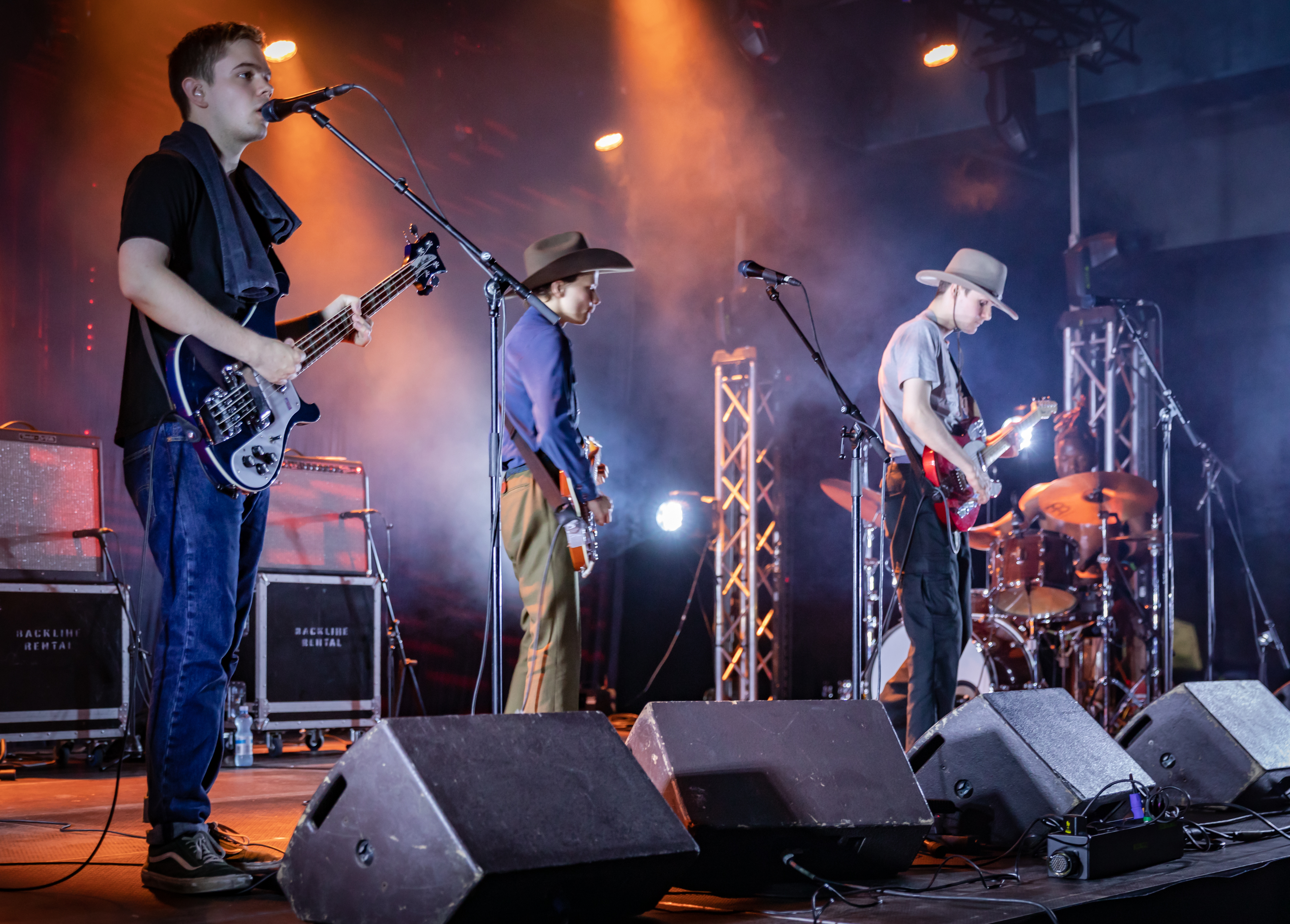
Black Midi performing at Sideways Festival 2019 in Helsinki, Finland

In January 2019 the group announced that they had signed to Rough Trade Records. The group released two singles on the label in March and April 2019, "Crows Perch" and "Talking Heads" respectively. On 14 May, the group announced their debut album titled Schlagenheim, which was released 21 June 2019. The album was recorded in 2018 with producer Dan Carey, who became impressed by the band at an early live show. Instead of merely recreating their live show, they chose to augment their sound with piano, accordion, synthesisers, banjo, and drum machines. "The idea was to do stuff that's impossible to do live", frontman Greep explained. "If the album and the gig are just the same, it's a bit sad." The majority of the album was recorded in just five days. At Metacritic, a website that assigns a weighted mean rating out of 100 to reviews from mainstream publications, Schlagenheim received a score of 82, based on 20 reviews, indicating "universal acclaim". The album was later nominated for the 2019 Mercury Prize.

On 7 March 2020, the band performed live at the BBC Radio 6 Music festival in Camden. In June 2020, the band released a jam and spoken word album via Bandcamp entitled The Black Midi Anthology Vol. 1: Tales of Suspense and Revenge, consisting of four short stories read by the members of the band over jam instrumentals as well as three instrumental mixes mostly taken from the same recordings as the spoken word tracks. On 16 June 2020, the band began hosting a monthly radio show called The Black Midi Variety Hour on NTS Radio. Six episodes have been produced so far. On 10 December 2020, the band performed a show with the group Black Country, New Road under the alias Black Midi, New Road as a charity gig for live venue The Windmill, Brixton. The show was livestreamed from The Windmill's Bandcamp page with an entry fee of £5. The group have performed under the Black Midi, New Road moniker at the venue before.

=== 2021–2023: Kwasniewski-Kelvin's departure, Cavalcade and Hellfire ===
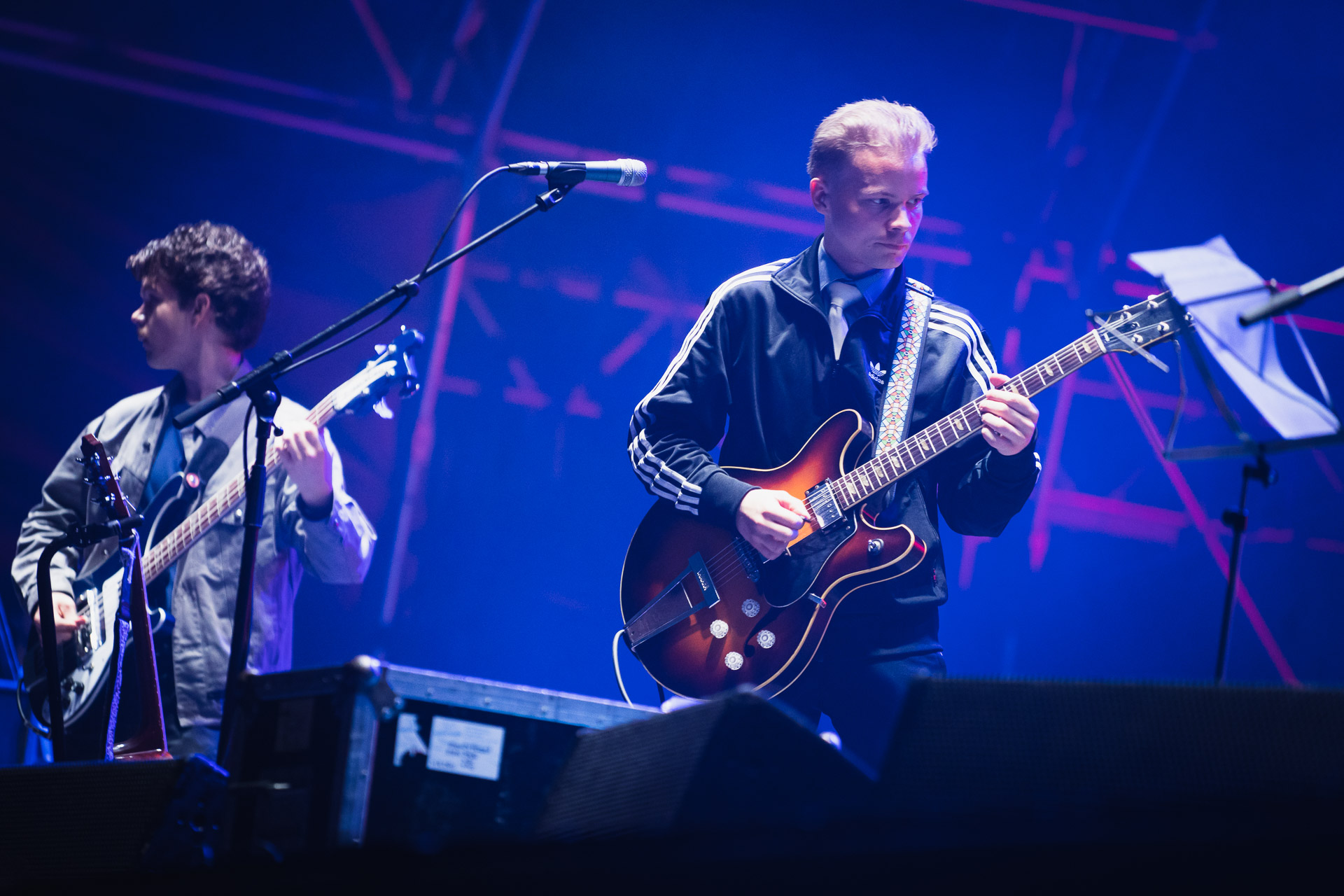
Wide Awake Festival 2021

On 15 January 2021, Black Midi announced through social media that their guitarist Matt Kwasniewski-Kelvin had been taking time off from the band due to mental health issues and that he would not be featured on forthcoming material from the band. The band announced their second studio album, Cavalcade, on 23 March 2021, which was released on 26 May 2021. On the day of the announcement, they also released the album's lead single, "John L", backed with the non-album track "Despair". Kwasniewski-Kelvin appears on the album only as composer on a couple of tracks; he was not part of the recording process. Touring members Akinnibi and Evans were a part of the album's recording sessions. A second single, "Slow", was released on 28 April and coincided with a second KEXP performance released the same day. This performance features Evans and Akinnibi as well as a small brass section.

The band toured Europe and the US in throughout 2021 and 2022. The band has also opened for themselves at concerts as an alter ego group known as Orange Tree Boys, touted as a funk blues band from Las Vegas. On 22 March 2022, the band released the digital EP Cavalcovers, a collection of cover versions of songs by King Crimson, Taylor Swift and Captain Beefheart originally released as flexi-disc bonus records with pre-ordered vinyl copies of Cavalcade. On 9 May 2022, they released "Welcome to Hell", the lead single from their third album, Hellfire. They released "Eat Men Eat", the second single from the album, on 15 June 2022. On 12 July, the third single, "Sugar/Tzu", was released. Hellfire was released on 15 July 2022 and charted at No. 22 in the United Kingdom, their highest placement yet. It also became their first album to chart in the United States, reaching No. 139. In the autumn of 2022, Black Midi announced the "Back in Black Tour" supported by Black Country, New Road in the United States. The band continued to debut unreleased material on this tour, including the songs "The Magician" and "Askance".

=== 2024–present: Indefinite hiatus and solo projects ===
On 10 August 2024, while on an Instagram Live promoting a series of solo concerts, Geordie Greep responded to questions about new Black Midi material by typing "no more black midi" and "It's iver" [sic] into the chat, also claiming that "Black Midi was an interesting band that's now indefinitely over", prompting speculation about the band's status. Bassist Cameron Picton confirmed the split on Twitter, admitting that the band "agreed not to say anything about 'breaking up'" and that he was blindsided by Greep's comments.

Pitchfork confirmed via the band's management that the group "are on a hiatus for now while they are working on solo projects". The Quietus received a further statement, clarifying that the band "agreed to have a break and do some solo work, with the understanding the Black Midi door be left open." Greep later admitted that the band "hadn't really been on speaking terms as a band a while before that". Black Midi had internally split before the announcement, but opted not to say anything publicly because, according to Greep, "In a few months it'll be obvious, and we won't need to say anything about it. But then it became apparent that wasn't really the case. People were all the time saying, 'What's happening?' I thought... who cares? Let's just say it. It's over – I don't want to string anyone along." In a subsequent interview, Greep expressed hesitancy regarding management's statement about the door being left open.

Greep quickly announced a solo album, The New Sound, which was released on 4 October 2024 and produced by Black Midi session member Seth Evans. Simpson became the touring and recording drummer for experimental jazz musician Nala Sinephro, appearing on her second studio album, Endlessness, released on 6 September 2024. He also performed on The New Sound and on rapper Little Simz' sixth studio album, Lotus (2025). Picton began to record under the pseudonym Camera Picture, self-releasing two mixtapes of solo material on Bandcamp, titled 44m50s and 36m33s, respectively. He later formed the group My New Band Believe, which also has Evans as a collaborator and keyboardist for the group. Picton released an eponymous album with the band on 10 April 2026.

On 12 January 2026, Rough Trade announced that Kwasniewski-Kelvin had died at the age of 26 "after a long battle with his mental health."

== Musical style ==
The band's sound has been variously labelled as experimental rock, art rock, progressive rock, math rock, post-punk, and avant-prog.

== Personnel ==
- Geordie Greep – vocals, guitars, keyboards, accordion, bass (2017–2024)
- Cameron Picton – bass, vocals, flute, keyboards, guitar (2017–2024)
- Morgan Simpson – drums, percussion (2017–2024)
- Matt Kwasniewski-Kelvin – guitar, vocals (2017–2021; died 2026)

Touring and session musicians

- Seth "Shank" Evans – keyboards, bass, synthesizers (2020–2023)
- Kaidi Akinnibi – tenor saxophones (2020–2022)
- Joe Bristow – trombone (2021)

=== Timeline ===
Black Midi performing at Rough Trade, London, 25th June 2019

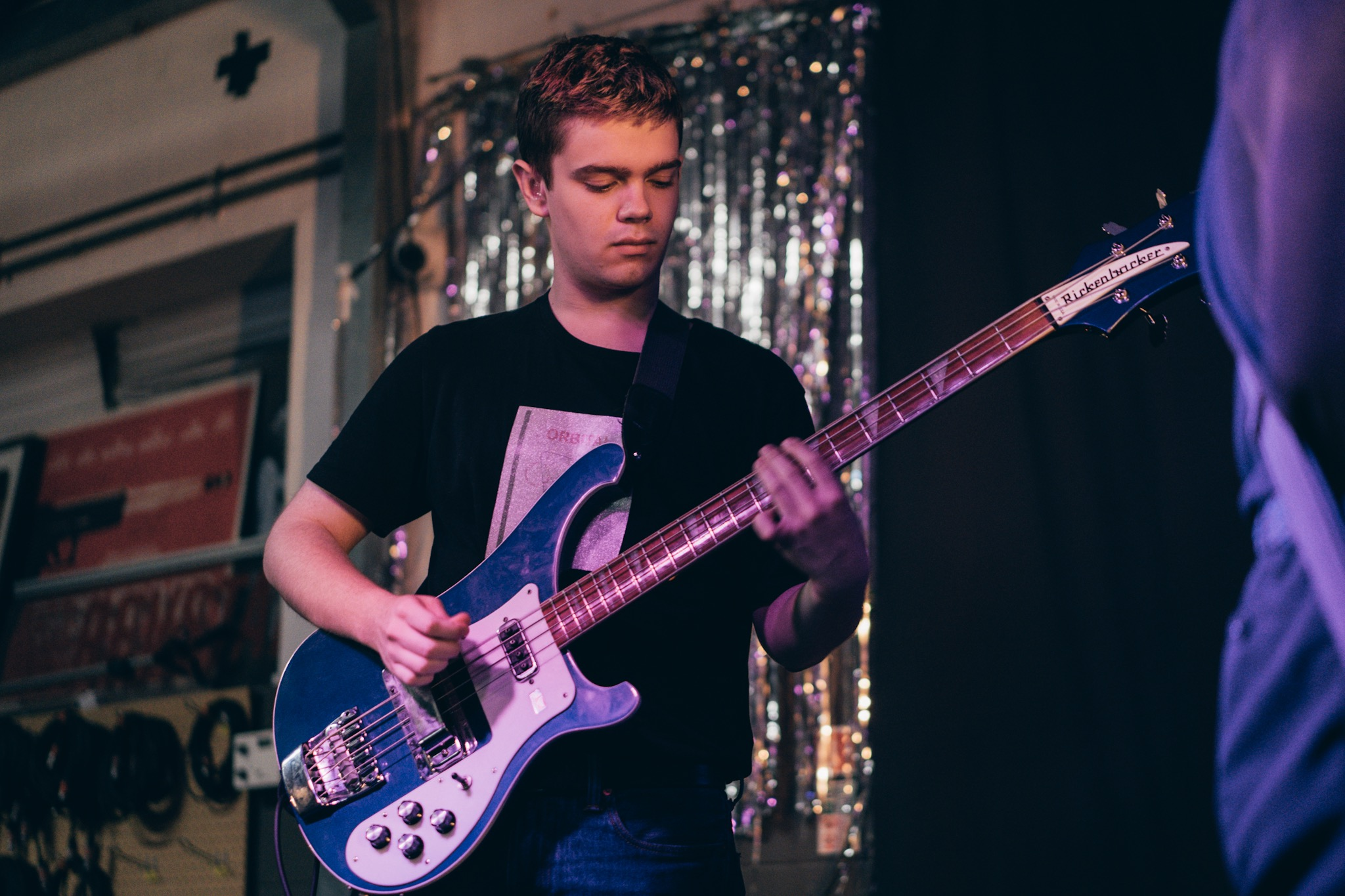
Cameron Picton

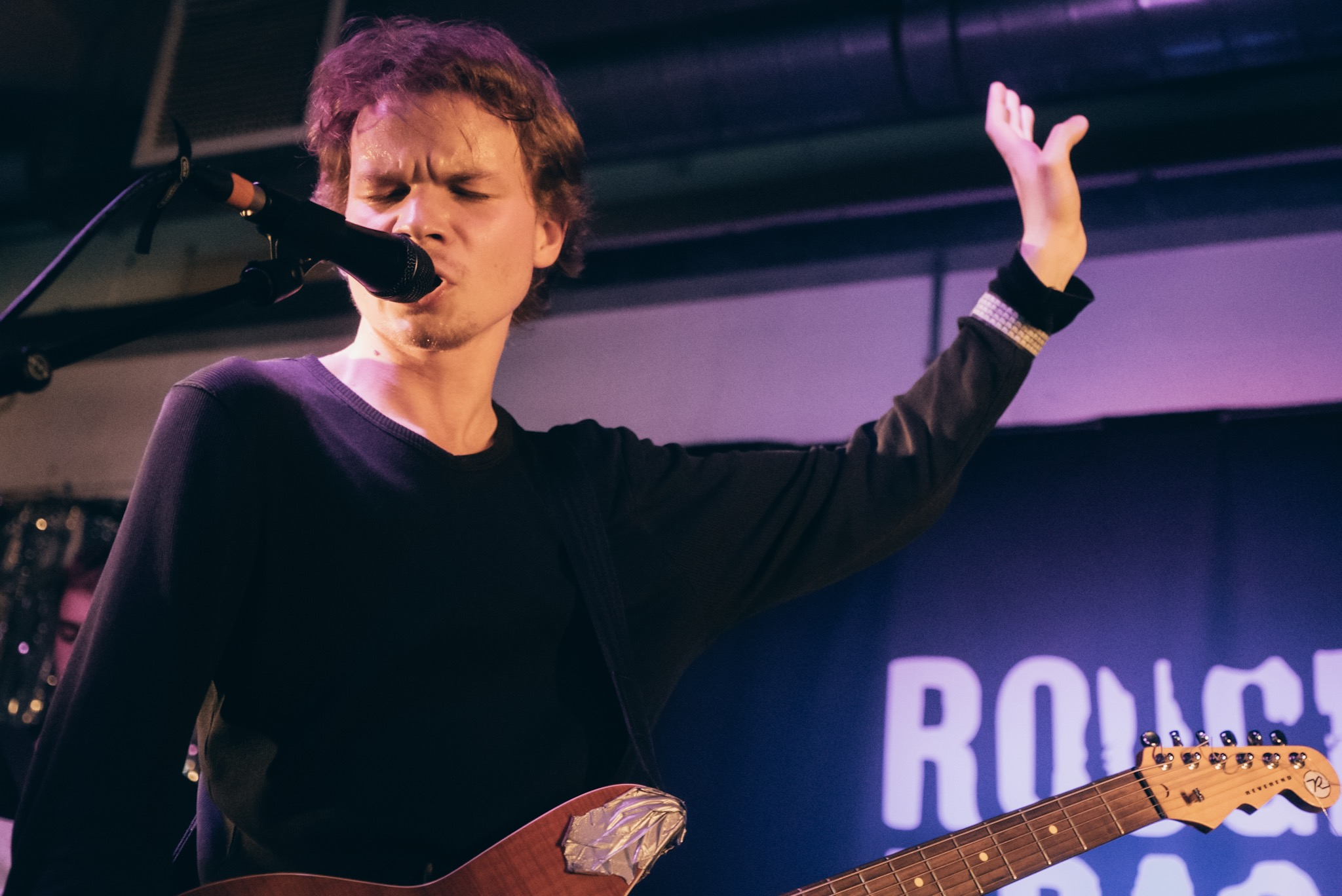
Geordie Greep

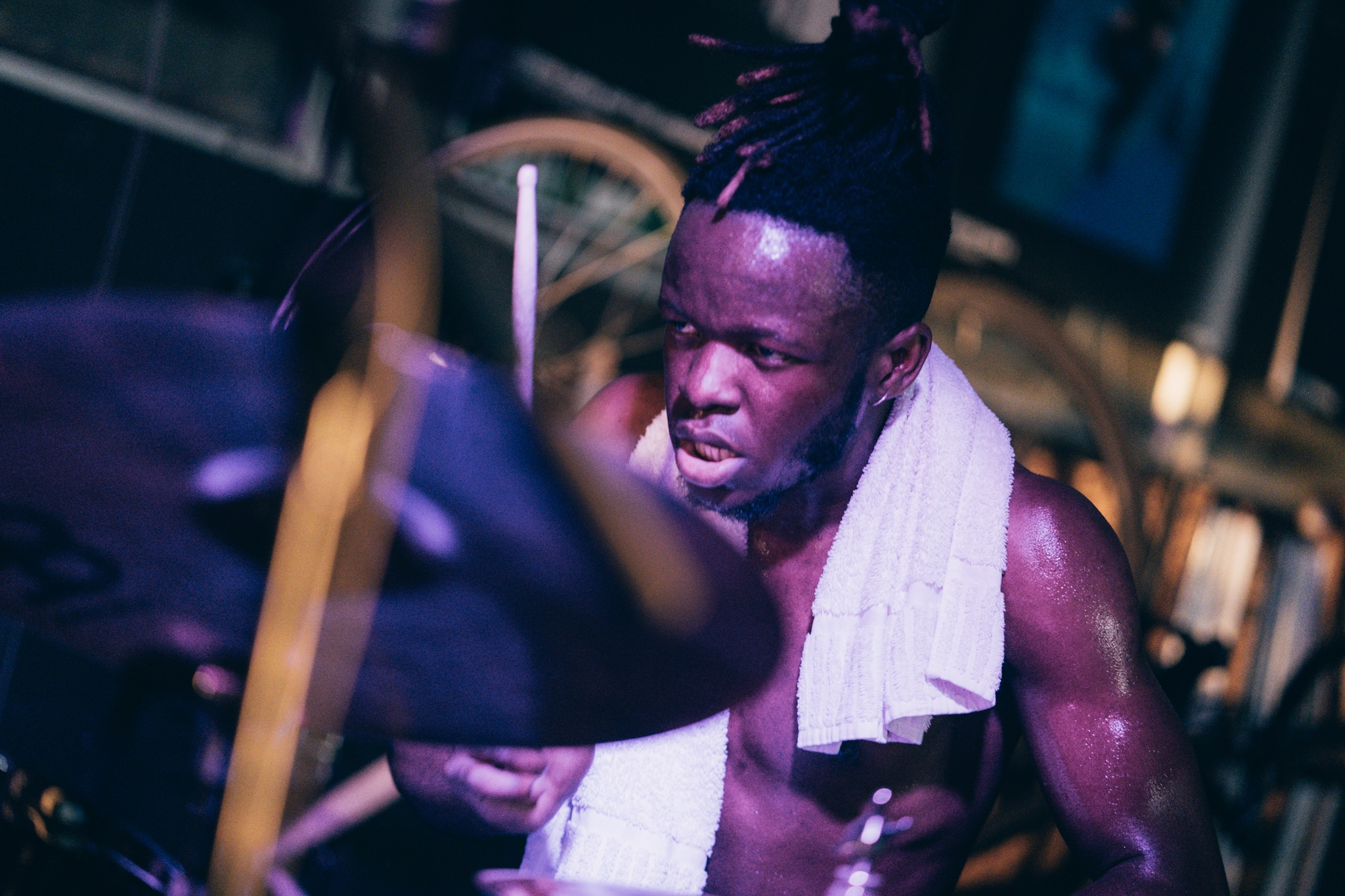
Morgan Simpson

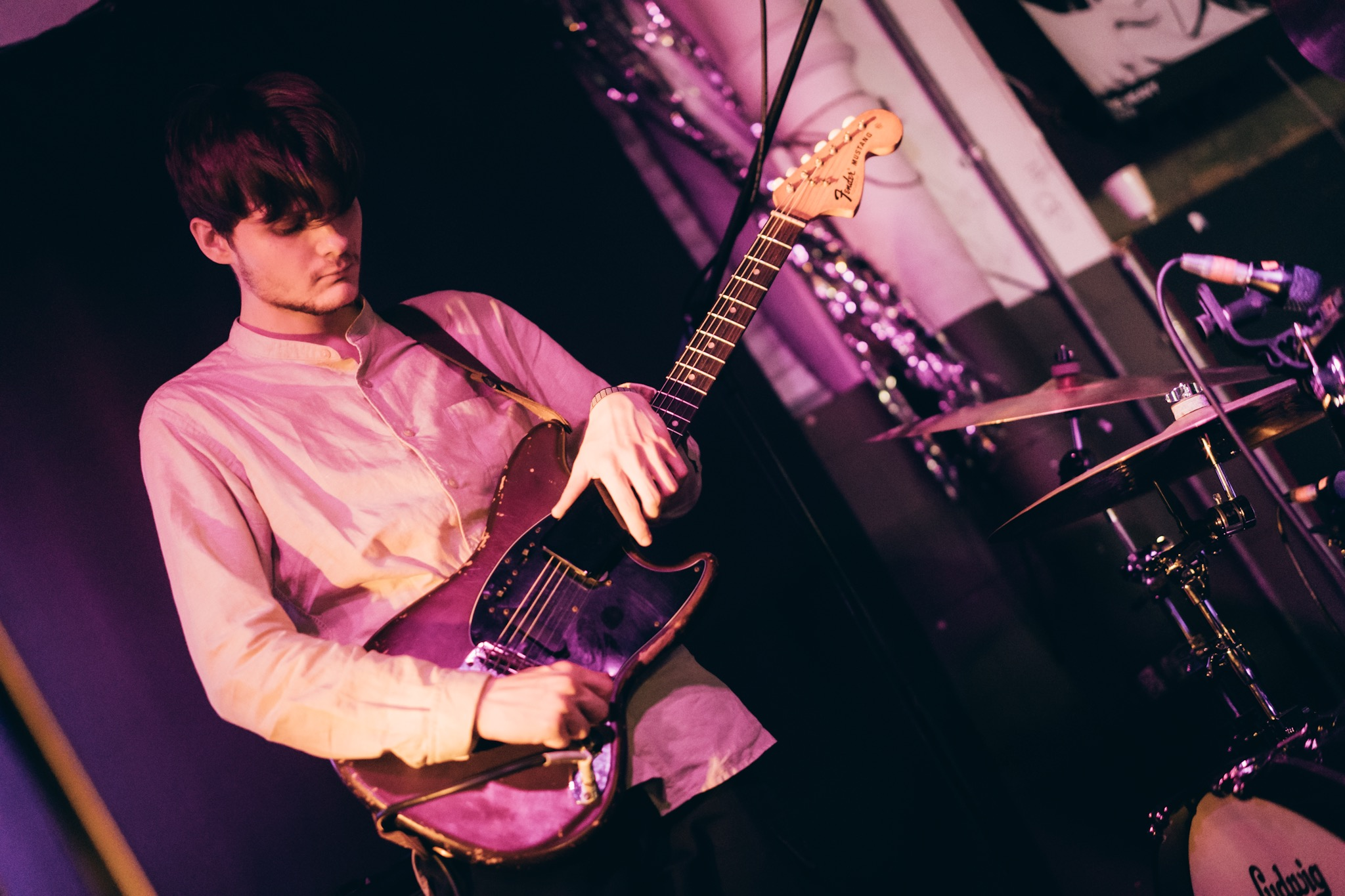
Matt Kwasniewski-Kelvin

== Discography ==
=== Studio albums ===
List of studio albums, with selected chart positions
Title	Album details	Peak chart positions						
Title	Album details	UK	AUS	BEL (FL)	JPN	SCO	US	US Indie
Schlagenheim	Released: 21 June 2019; Label: Rough Trade; Format: CD, LP, cassette, download	43	—	113	211	40	—	41
Cavalcade	Released: 26 May 2021; Label: Rough Trade; Format: CD, LP, cassette, digital	60	81	66	62	18	—	48
Hellfire	Released: 15 July 2022; Label: Rough Trade; Format: CD, LP, cassette, digital	22	45	90	58	7	139	15

=== Compilations ===
List of collections
Title	Album details
The Black Midi Anthology Vol. 1: Tales of Suspense and Revenge	Released: 5 June 2020; Label: Self-released; Format: Digital
Covercade	Released: 28 May 2021; Label: Rough Trade; Format: CD

=== Extended plays ===
List of extended plays
Title	Album details
BM Xmas Covers	Released: 18 December 2020; Label: Self-Released; Format: Digital
Cavalcovers	Released: 22 March 2022; Label: Self-released; Format: Digital

=== Live albums/EPs ===
List of live albums
Title	Album details
Damo Suzuki Live at the Windmill Brixton with 'Sound Carriers' black midi (with Damo Suzuki)	Released: 28 September 2018; Label: Self-released; Format: Cassette
Live at KEXP	Released: 21 June 2019; Label: Rough Trade; Format: CD
Live on Canal St, NYC ('The Pizza EP')	Released: 29 November 2019; Label: Rough Trade; Format: LP, CD
Black Midi Live in the USA	Released: 21 March 2020; Label: Self-released; Format: Digital; Featuring: Fat Tony
Live-Cade	Released: 16 November 2021; Label: Rough Trade; Format: LP
Live Fire	Released: 14 November 2022; Label: Rough Trade; Format: LP, CD

=== Singles ===
Title	Year	Album
"bmbmbm"	2018	Schlagenheim
"Speedway"	2019	Schlagenheim
"Crow's Perch"	2019	Non-album singles
"Talking Heads"	2019	Non-album singles
"Ducter"	2019	Schlagenheim
"7-Eleven"	2019	Non-album singles
"Sweater"	2020	Non-album singles
"John L / Despair"	2021	Cavalcade
"Slow (Loud)"	2021	Cavalcade
"Chondromalacia Patella"	2021	Cavalcade
"Cruising"	2021	Non-album single
"Welcome to Hell"	2022	Hellfire
"Eat Men Eat"	2022	Hellfire
"Sugar/Tzu"	2022	Hellfire

=== Other appearances ===
Year	Song	Album
2018	"Ice Cream" (with Jerskin Fendrix)	It's Briiiiiixmaaaaaas!
2018	"Of Rivia (Live)"	Independent Venue Week (Live 2018)
2020	"bmbmbm (Live)" "Extended Jam (Live)" (with Black Country, New Road as "black midi, new road")	Live at The Windmill
2020	"953 (Live)"	Live at Windmill Brixton - In Between the Lockdowns
2023	"Jingle Bell Rock"	Jangle Bells - A Rough Trade Shops Christmas Selection

=== Music videos ===
List of music videos, showing year released and director
Title	Year	Album	Director(s)
"Speedway"	2019	Schlagenheim	Cameron Picton
"Crow's Perch"	2019	—N/a	Vilhjálmur Yngvi Hjálmarsson
"Ducter"	2019	Schlagenheim	Anthony Macbain and Roxie Vizcarra
"John L"	2021	Cavalcade	Nina McNeely
"Slow"	2021	Cavalcade	Gustaf Holtenäs
"Chondromalacia Patella"	2021	Cavalcade	Vilhjálmur Yngvi Hjálmarsson
"Welcome To Hell"	2022	Hellfire	Gustaf Holtenäs
"Eat Men Eat"	2022	Hellfire	Maxim Kelly
"Sugar/Tzu"	2022	Hellfire	Noel Paul

== Awards and nominations ==
Year	Award	Category	Work	Result	Ref.
2019	AIM Independent Music Awards	UK Independent Breakthrough	Black Midi	Nominated	
2020	Libera Awards	Marketing Genius	Schlagenheim	Nominated	
2021	Mercury Prize	Album of the Year	Schlagenheim	Nominated	
2022	UK Music Video Awards	Best Alternative Video - UK	"Sugar/Tzu"	Nominated	
2022	UK Music Video Awards	Best Alternative Video - UK	"Eat Men Eat"	Nominated	
2022	UK Music Video Awards	Best Editing in a Video	"Eat Men Eat"	Nominated	
2022	UK Music Video Awards	Best Editing in a Video	"Sugar/Tzu"	Nominated	
2022	UK Music Video Awards	Best Cinematography in a Video	"Sugar/Tzu"	Won	
2022	UK Music Video Awards	Best Animation in a Video	"Welcome to Hell"	Nominated	
2023	Libera Awards	Best Heavy Record	Hellfire	Won	
2023	Libera Awards	Best Short-Form Video	Hellfire TikTok Promotion	Nominated	
2023	Berlin Music Video Awards	Best Editor	Sugar/Tzu	Win	
