= Matt Kwasniewski-Kelvin =

English guitarist (1999–2026)

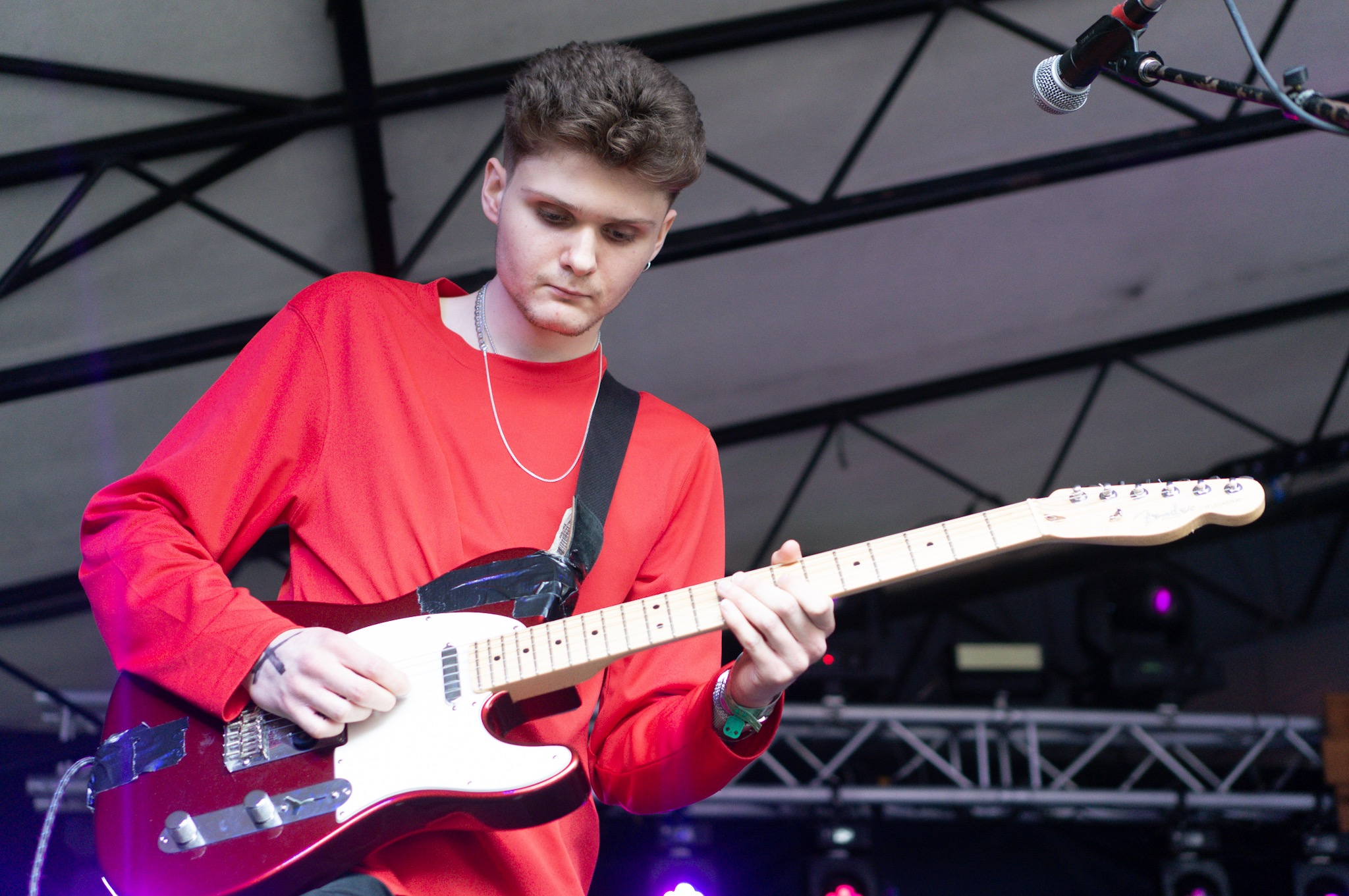
- Kwasniewski-Kelvin performing with Black Midi in March 2019

Background information
- Born: Matthew Antony Kwasniewski-Kelvin; 8 February 1999
- Died: 12 January 2026 (aged 26)
- Genres: Math rock; noise rock; experimental rock
- Occupation: Musician
- Years active: 2017–2026
- Formerly of: Black Midi

Matthew Antony Kwasniewski-Kelvin (8 February 1999 – 12 January 2026) was an English musician and guitarist of the rock band Black Midi from its foundation until his departure in 2020. The group were a part of British rock music's Windmill scene.

Kwasniewski-Kelvin recorded one album with the band, Schlagenheim (2019), before departing the following year due to mental health difficulties. Prior to his departure, Kwasniewski-Kelvin contributed to the writing process for the band's second studio album, Cavalcade (2021), and later contributed to recordings by Greentea Peng and Wu-Lu.

== Early life ==
Kwasniewski-Kelvin was one-quarter Polish. As a child, he was a fan of pop-punk and classic rock. He cited his father's CDs and records as how he started listening to music from a young age, along with YouTube. His father's collection featured Bruce Springsteen and Eric Clapton. At around 10 to 11, he began listening to Green Day and Good Charlotte. He cited Led Zeppelin and Jimi Hendrix as favorites. He later met Geordie Greep who introduced him to noise and experimental rock.

== Career ==
Kwasniewski-Kelvin met Geordie Greep, Cameron Picton and Morgan Simpson at a London performance arts institution, The BRIT School. The group would form Black Midi in 2017. In 2021, Kwasniewski-Kelvin announced his departure from Black Midi due to mental health difficulties. Prior to his departure, Kwasniewski-Kelvin contributed to the writing process for the band's second studio album, Cavalcade (2021), and later contributed to recordings by Greentea Peng and Wu-Lu.

== Death and legacy ==
Kwasniewski-Kelvin died by suicide on 12 January 2026.

In 2026, British newspaper The Guardian stated "Kwasniewski-Kelvin helped to make Black Midi into one of the most talked-about, musically adventurous rock bands in recent years".

== Discography ==
With black midi:

- Singles
  - "Crow's Perch" (2019)
  - "Talking Heads" (2019)
  - "7-eleven" (2019)
  - "Sweater" (2020)
- Studio albums
  - Schlagenheim (2019)
  - The Black Midi Anthology Vol. 1: Tales of Suspense and Revenge (2020)
- Live albums
  - Damo Suzuki Live At The Windmill Brixton With 'Sound Carriers' Black Midi (with Damo Suzuki) (2018)
  - Live at KEXP (2019)
  - Live on Canal St, NYC (2019)
  - Live in the USA (2020)

As featuring artist:

  - "Mixed Messages" - Rosie Alena (2019)
  - Man Made - Greentea Peng ("This Sound") (2021)
  - Loggerhead - Wu-Lu (2022)
  - "General Behaviour" - Tedd Maul (2026)

As solo artist:

- Singles
  - "Paedophile Ring (Free Palestine) (End the Holocaust) (End the War Now)" (2024)
