= Geordie Greep =

English musician (born 1999)

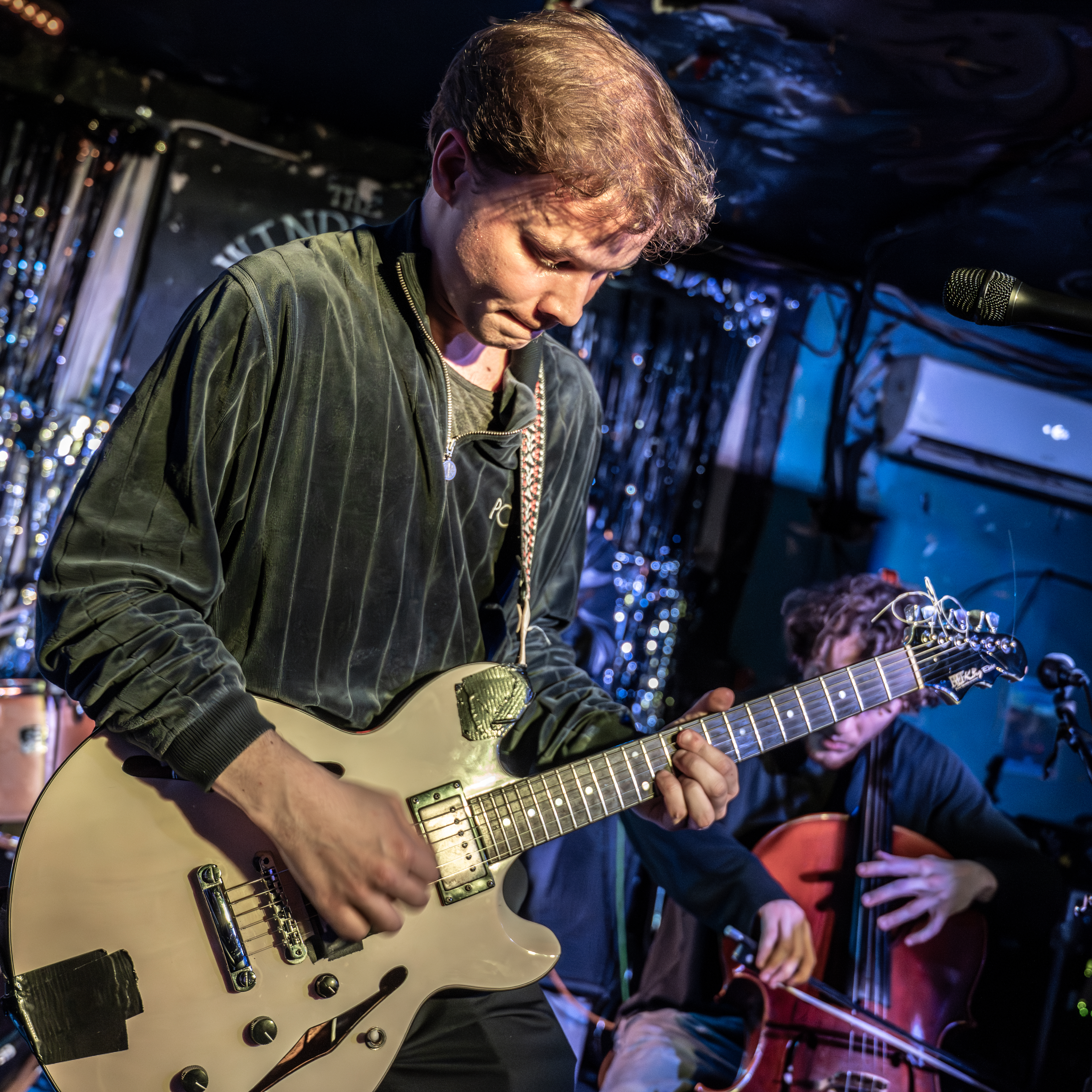
- Greep performing in 2024

Background information
- Born: Geordie Wade Greep; 20 August 1999 (age 27); Walthamstow, London, England
- Genres: Experimental rock; math rock; jazz fusion; art rock; avant-prog; post-punk; progressive rock; Latin rock
- Occupations: Musician; singer; songwriter
- Instruments: Vocals; guitar; keyboards; accordion; bass; baritone guitar
- Years active: 2011–present
- Labels: Rough Trade; Speedy Wunderground
- Formerly of: Black Midi

Geordie Wade Greep (/ˈdʒɔːrdi ˈɡriːp/ JOR-dee GREEP; born 20 August 1999) is an English musician, singer and songwriter. From 2017 to 2024, he was the frontman and lead guitarist of the British rock band Black Midi, part of British rock music's Windmill scene.

While attending the BRIT School, he met Matt Kwasniewski-Kelvin, Cameron Picton, and Morgan Simpson; together they went on to form Black Midi. The group began performing live at Brixton pub The Windmill, the only venue to reply to Greep's emails requesting gigs. After signing with Rough Trade Records in 2019, the band enjoyed critical acclaim with their three studio albums, Schlagenheim, Cavalcade, and Hellfire. With Black Midi going on hiatus, Greep began a solo career and released his debut studio album, The New Sound via Rough Trade Records on 4 October 2024.

Greep is noted for his unique singing voice, partly due to his accent, which The Guardian described as "geographically unclassifiable". He often writes dramatic narratives in his songs, many of which are centered on specific characters, such as in the Black Midi song "John L".

== Early life ==
Geordie Wade Greep was born on 20 August 1999 and raised in Walthamstow, London. There he attended Frederick Bremer School, and has considered his upbringing in the town beneficial, citing its cultural diversity as "brilliant for a young person". He has credited his father with helping him develop a taste for music in his youth, teaching him that "there are [sic] good and bad music, and there are no boundaries between genres". He would frequently listen to his father's record collection of progressive rock, classical music, and country and was also interested in the "whiz-bang impact" of cartoon scores.

Greep first took interest in the guitar when he was given the video game Guitar Hero for his seventh birthday. He grew fond of the music featured in the game, in particular "Take Me Out" by Franz Ferdinand. Greep later received an electric guitar for his eighth birthday. Around this time, his father would lend him CDs of Black Sabbath and Led Zeppelin, and progressive rock bands such as Pink Floyd, Genesis, and King Crimson and jazz musicians such as Miles Davis.

His first experiences of playing live music came at around age 11, when he began playing gospel music in churches, despite the fact he did not have a religious upbringing. The performances had a profound effect on his musical development, bringing him experiences of improvising while playing, a practice that he has stated is lacking in the education of secular white musicians.

== Career ==
=== 2017–2018: BRIT School and formation of Black Midi ===
Greep met fellow guitarist Matt Kwasniewski-Kelvin at the BRIT School, and the two began to busk together regularly in Bromley, London. Through their MIDI lessons at the school, Greep would learn of the genre black MIDI. Though he has stated he knew little about the genre, he suggested it to Kwasniewski-Kelvin as a potential band name.

The two later met drummer Morgan Simpson, and their sound began to take on more rock and funk influences. Their lineup would be completed when they enlisted bassist Cameron Picton a month before their first show at The Windmill, in Brixton. After a later show at The Windmill, the group would find themselves approached by record producer Dan Carey, with whom they recorded their debut single, "bmbmbm".

=== 2019–2023: Black Midi albums and touring ===
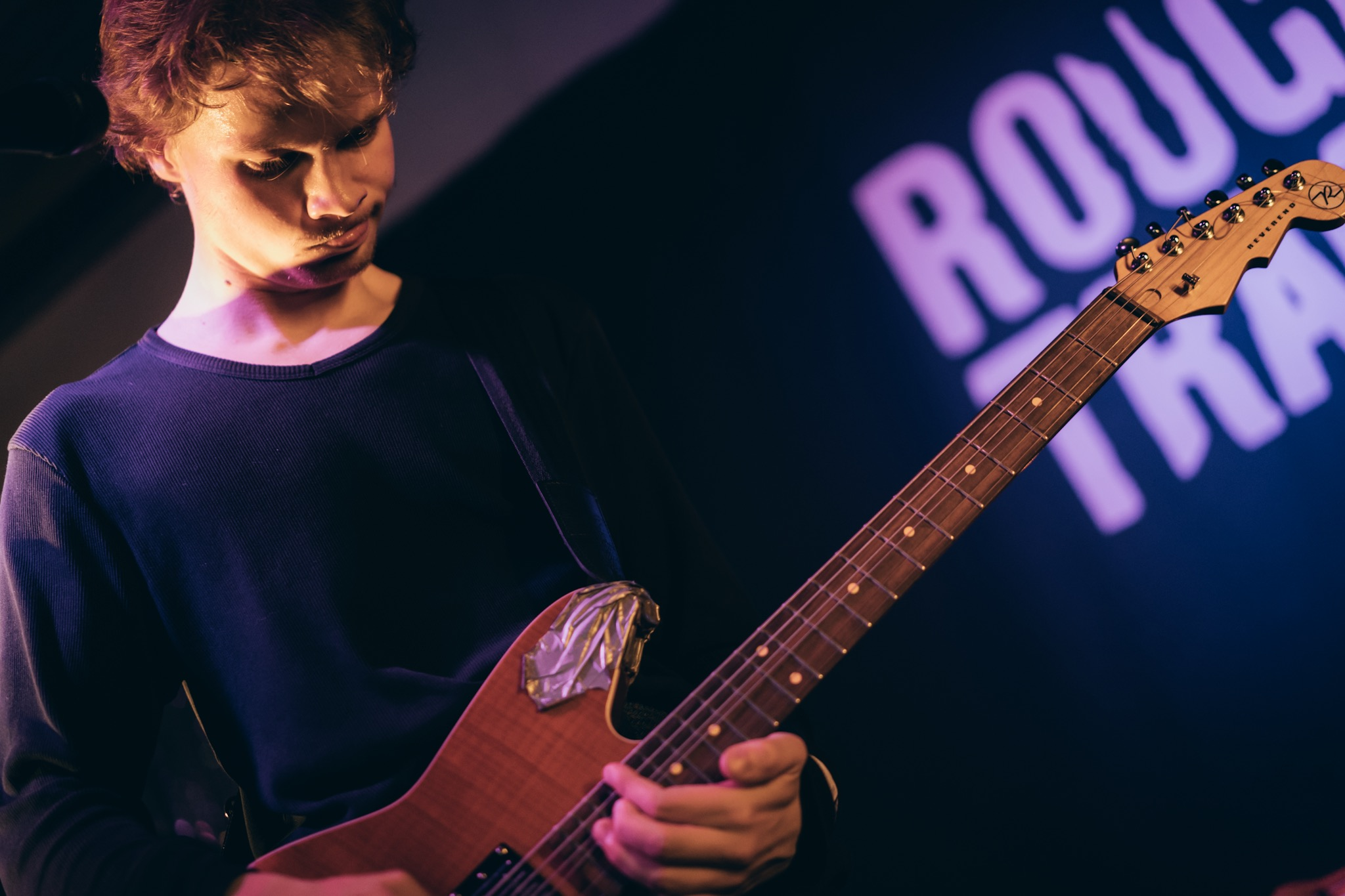
Greep performing with Black Midi live in June 2019

Their experience with Carey was positive, and the band naturally decided to work with him again for their debut studio album Schlagenheim. Greep said of the process: "It went really well and started such a good relationship, so when it came time and we had the means to make an album, he just seemed like the best choice. I could just tell from the way he was talking about the music that he got it completely." However, instead of being released under Carey's Speedy Wunderground label, Schlagenheim was released under Rough Trade Records, with whom the band had signed earlier that year. Schlagenheim was released to critical acclaim, being nominated for the 2019 Mercury Prize.

Following the release of their single "Sweater" in 2020, Black Midi looked to move in a different direction with their next album. Their songwriting process moved away from jamming and improvisation. According to Greep, they would start bringing in songs they had completed on their own and would then play together. In order to capture the new direction of their sound, they worked with producer John "Spud" Murphy for what would become their sophomore studio album, Cavalcade. The lyricism of Cavalcade's songwriting would put greater emphasis on narratives, consisting of stories centered around characters written from third-person perspectives.

Cavalcade was similarly acclaimed to Schlagenheim, with critics noting that it was more ambitious and difficult than its predecessor.

The following year, Black Midi released their third studio album, Hellfire, a title Greep had originally suggested for Schlagenheim. The role of producer was this time filled by Marta Salogni, with whom the band had previously recorded "John L" from Cavalcade. In contrast to the third-person narratives of Cavalcade, the songs of Hellfire are largely written in first person. Greep has stated that the album was not explicitly inspired by the idea of hell, rather the concept served to tie the album's stories together under a cohesive theme.

Hellfire, much like the group's first two albums, was released to widespread critical acclaim; however, it also achieved considerable commercial success, becoming their highest-charting album in the UK to date, and their first album to chart in the US. After the release of Hellfire, Black Midi continued to tour into 2023, but would not release any studio material that year or the following.

=== 2024–Present: Solo debut ===
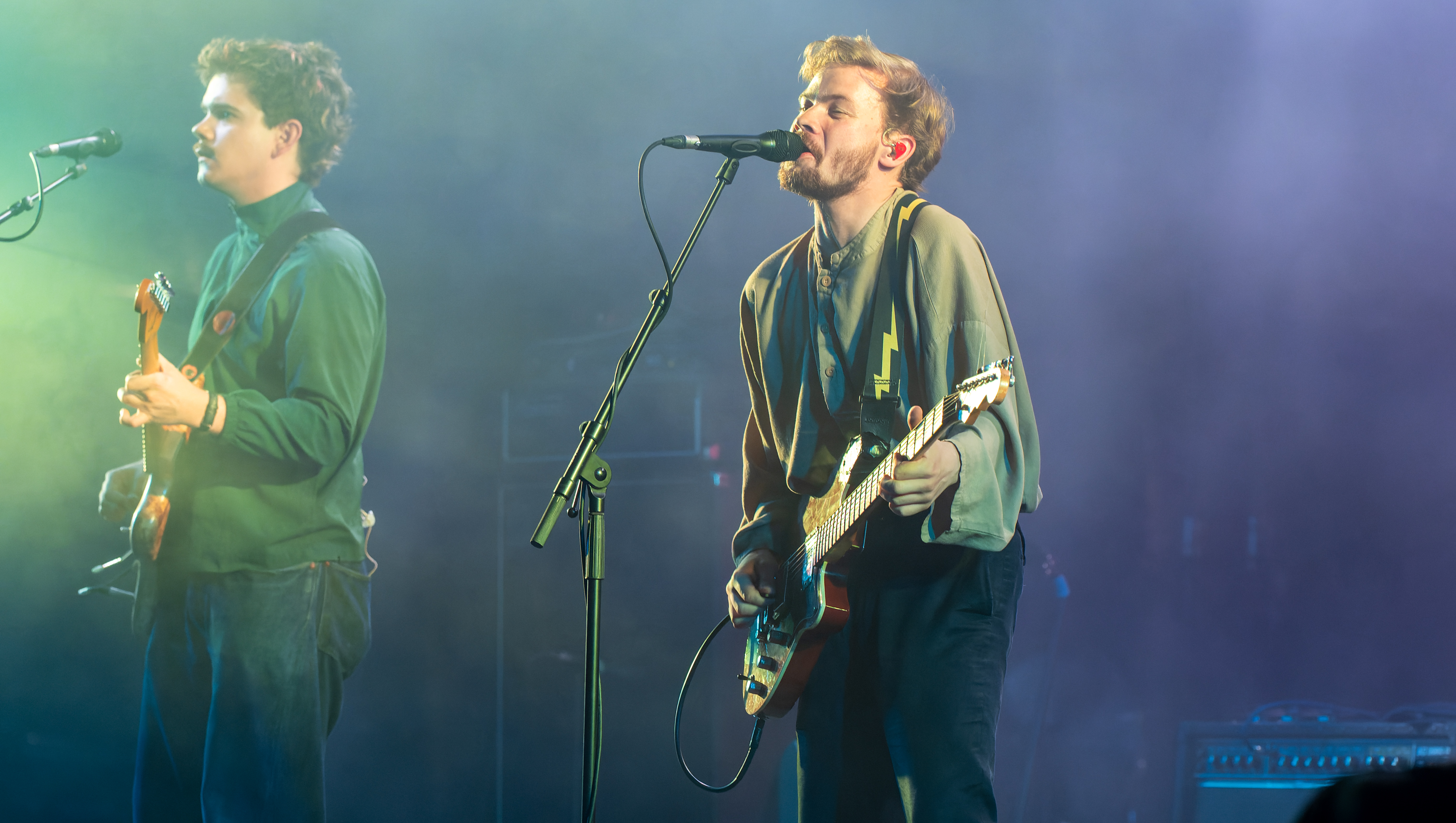
Greep with Black Midi in July 2023

In August 2024, a representative of Black Midi confirmed that they were on indefinite hiatus; the announcement was preceded by postings from Greep on social media, in which he stated that "Black Midi was an interesting band that's now indefinitely over".

Earlier in 2024 and prior to the disbandment, Greep had been performing solo live shows. On 20 August 2024, Greep announced his debut studio album The New Sound, premiering the lead single "Holy, Holy". He said of the album, "the main theme of the record is desperation; you don't hear an unreliable narrator but someone who is kidding themselves that they have everything under control, but they don't." For The New Sound, Greep collaborated with Seth "Shank" Evans, a member of HMLTD and former Black Midi touring musician, as Evans produced the album and performed guest vocals on the song "Motorbike".

The New Sound was released on 4 October 2024 and received positive reviews from music publications such as Pitchfork. Ahead of The New Sound's release, Greep noted that he may record a second solo album in 2024: "I've got enough for another one. I'm going to try and record at the end of this year. The New Sound was done over like nine months, it was quite a long time going. So I want to try and do an album in, like, two days—ECM-style. Record one day, mix the next day, and that's it. That would be great." Ultimately, there was no second album that year.

Greep embarked on the Live in the USA Tour on 6 September 2025 with Charlie Schefft, Eden Marsh, Dave Strawn, Cameron Campbell, and Santiago Moyano performing as his live band. The tour consists of eighteen dates, including a 7:00 p.m. show on 14 September at Metro Chicago and concluded on 28 September, followed by a performance at the 2025 Balaclava Fest on 9 November.

Greep partially contributed guitar and fully produced Knats' May 2026 album A Great Day In Newcastle.

== Musical style ==
Sonically, Black Midi's sound has been variously labeled as experimental rock, art rock, progressive rock, math rock, post-punk, and avant-prog. He has denied that the band's experimental sound was an intentional part of their formation, instead saying it was simply the result of the band playing together as friends first and foremost. Greep's decision to play a baritone guitar came from his fondness for spaghetti Western music, learning from his father that baritone guitars played a part in its sound.

One of the main methods for creating something original is also the thing of copying or emulating something you can't do and you'll never be able to do. We can't play many styles of music to the expert level, so, in failing to sound exactly like the originals, you'll come up with something original—or you'd hope so.

— Geordie Greep on songwriting

Stylistically, Black Midi's songs often start out as pastiches of other styles or genres that change and evolve through improvisation and experimentation. For example, Greep has said that "27 Questions" from Hellfire was inspired by Argentine tango.

Greep has stated that his signature singing style was inspired by a desire to subvert typical rock vocal stereotypes, in order to avoid coming across as "macho", instead desiring a more melodic approach. In combination with his accent, his unique sound has been described by one critic as a "warped croon".

Lyrically, Greep prefers to write fictional stories into his songs rather than speak on real world issues, saying: "I can't speak too intelligently about any of that. I don't really have anything intelligent to say. Of course there are things going wrong all the time but when we write lyrics it's more about stories than real stuff." Speculation surrounds much of Greep's lyrics, as he leaves much to obscurity. However, he has gone on record as stating that "27 Questions" is his most personal lyrical work yet.

== Influences ==
Greep has taken a large amount of influence from classical music. Classical music had influence on him from his youth, and he has called John Eliot Gardiner's recording of Bach's Mass in B minor his "two favourite hours of recorded music ever". He has also named Igor Stravinsky, Béla Bartók and Alfred Schnittke as classical influences.

Greep has also taken great influence from Frank Zappa and Boredoms, whose albums We're Only in It for the Money and Vision Creation Newsun respectively he has both listed as two of his all-time favourites. His experience with Zappa goes back to playing "Willie the Pimp" with his electronics teacher at his school's winter concert. Greep shared that his experience at a Boredoms concert when he was a teenager was influential to his spontaneous, experimental, and improvisational ethos as a live performer.

== Personal life ==
Greep is an avid fan of boxing, often expressing his admiration for the sport in interviews. He has named Sugar Ray Leonard as his favourite boxer. Boxing has also influenced Black Midi's music, serving as the inspiration for the band's song "Sugar/Tzu", with Greep stating: "In boxing, there's the intensity, just nonstop—everything is over the top. That's kind of with our stuff as well. If there is a more emotional song or whatever, it's pushed to the max, it's very brash and almost comedically intense."

He is also a fan of bowling, stating that the first thing he planned to do once the COVID-19 lockdown ended was to go bowling. He later used an alley in Essex as the setting for the music video of "Holy, Holy".

=== Sexual assault allegation ===
On the evening of 7 October 2026, while on tour in Vancouver, Greep drank with a small group of locals at an apartment along with his keyboardist, Cameron Campbell. The partygoers fell asleep at 5 AM; Greep awoke an hour later. He had falsely assumed a woman who was present at the apartment had become infatuated with him and attempted to make out with her while she was still asleep, waking her up; he was immediately removed from the apartment. Campbell informed the rest of Greep's performing band before quitting and driving to the airport.

On 8 October, before Greep was due to perform a concert, the band confronted him about his behaviour. Soon after, someone known to the victim handed out flyers outside the venue accusing Greep of rape; after seeing these backstage, the rest of Greep's band followed Campbell in quitting. On stage, Greep denied the flyers' allegations, but admitted he had "got the wrong end of the stick with someone who was there" and "made a move... a complete misunderstanding on my part". He proceeded to perform alone for the rest of the night and announced all proceeds would go to victims of sexual abuse; after the performance, the rest of his North American tour was cancelled and, later, his European tour was also cancelled.

The victim explained the situation in an anonymous statement to Paste that the flyers were shared without her permission, stating, "I just wanted to try and process and move on from a really shitty night, but now it's all over the Internet". She denied that the incident constituted rape, but affirmed that she had been sexually assaulted, stating that it was "not just a peck", and that "if I'd had a couple more drinks and didn't wake up when I did, I don't know what would have happened." Greep later issued a statement on his Instagram account confirming the victim's story and apologising, stating he "honestly did not realise” the victim was asleep and that it was "a huge mistake... I’m not trying to minimise what happened in any way". Multiple members of Greep's former backing band have gone on to allege that Greep is an alcoholic, and have praised Campbell's decision to leave first. Dave Strawn, Greep's touring bassist, said of Greep's behaviour: "Drinking is no excuse. We have to be better".

== Discography ==
Solo

- The New Sound (2024)

with Black Midi

- Schlagenheim (2019)
- Cavalcade (2021)
- Hellfire (2022)
