= Morgan Simpson =

English drummer (born 1998)

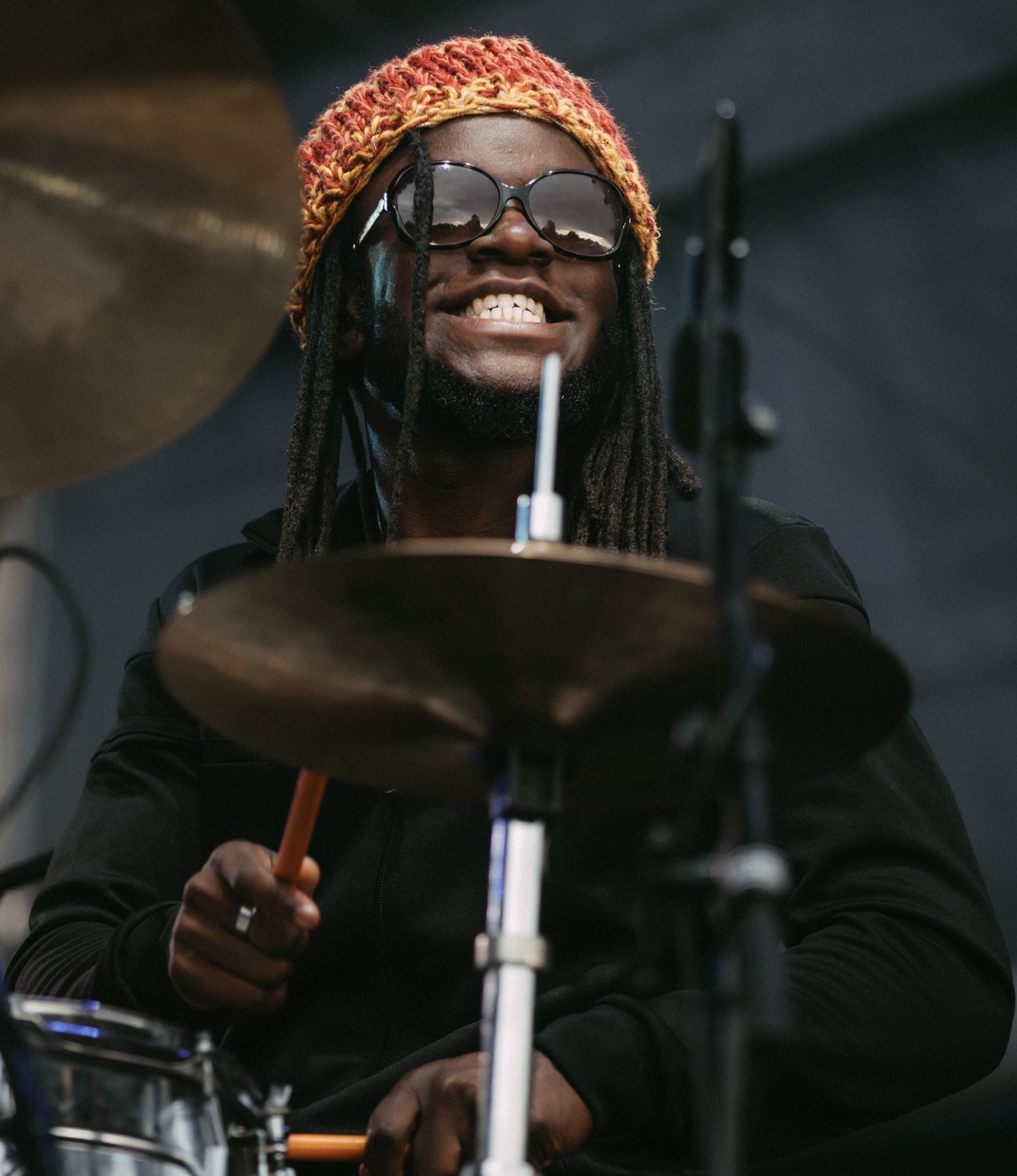
- Simpson performing with Black Midi in 2022

Background information
- Born: Morgan George Simpson; October 29, 1998 (age 27)
- Genres: Math rock; jazz; experimental rock; noise rock; fusion
- Occupation: Musician
- Years active: 2017–present
- Label: Rough Trade
- Formerly of: Black Midi

Morgan George Simpson (born 29 October 1998) is an English drummer best known for his work with south London band Black Midi. The group were a part of British rock music's Windmill scene.

== Early life ==
Simpson started playing drums when he was two years old. He grew up listening to gospel artists Fred Hammonds, Kirk Franklin and Richard Smallwood, as well as soul singers Stevie Wonder, Marvin Gaye and Aretha Franklin. When he was 15, Simpson won the prestigious Young Drummer of the Year 2014 competition. He started attending the BRIT School at age 16, where he met future bandmates Geordie Greep, Matt Kwasniewski-Kelvin and Cameron Picton.

== Career ==
Black Midi started playing shows at The Windmill in Brixton, South London, in 2017. After a later show at The Windmill, the group would find themselves approached by record producer Dan Carey, with whom they would record their debut single, "bmbmbm". The band were signed by Rough Trade in early 2019 and would release their debut album, Schlagenheim, in June. Black Midi released two more albums before splitting up in 2024. Simpson worked with jazz musician Nala Sinephro and rapper Little Simz, appearing on their albums Endlessness (2024) and Lotus (2025) respectively.

== Discography ==
with Black Midi

- Schlagenheim (2019)
- Cavalcade (2021)
- Hellfire (2022)

with other artists

- "Mixed Messages" - Rosie Alena (2019)
- Loggerhead - Wu-Lu (2022)
- Gentle Confrontation - Loraine James (2023) ("I DM U")
- Hymn for My Dad - Finn Carter (2024)
- Dos Atomos - Dos Monos (2024) ("HI NO TORI", "ATOM")
- Endlessness - Nala Sinephro (2024) ("Continuum 1")
- The New Sound - Geordie Greep (2024) ("Blues", "Walk Up", "Motorbike")
- Lotus - Little Simz (2025) ("Enough")
- Once Upon a Time... in Shropshire - Jerskin Fendrix (2025) ("Princess", "Sk1", "Jerskin Fendrix Freestyle")
