= Holy, Holy =

Single by Geordie Greep

from the album The New Sound
- Released: 20 August 2024
- Studio: Estudio Do Tuto and Da Pá Virada, São Paulo, Brazil
- Genre: Progressive rock, art rock, Latin rock
- Length: 6:03
- Label: Rough Trade
- Songwriter: Geordie Greep
- Producer: Seth "Shank" Evans

Geordie Greep singles chronology
"Holy, Holy" (2024)	"Blues" (2024)

Music video
- "Holy, Holy" on YouTube

"Holy, Holy" is a progressive rock song by English musician Geordie Greep. It was released on 20 August 2024 on Rough Trade Records as the lead single from his first solo album, The New Sound, as well as Greep's debut single as a solo artist.

The song, produced by Seth "Shank" Evans, combines elements of jazz-rock with Latin and Brazilian influences, while its lyrics take a satirical perspective on arrogance and insecurities related to masculinity and misogyny. "Holy, Holy" received positive reviews upon its publication, with Pitchfork naming it a "Best New Track" and later one of the best songs of 2024, while other reviews commented on its status as an ambitious debut for Greep's solo career.

== Background ==
"Holy, Holy" was recorded as part of the sessions for what would become Geordie Greep's debut album, The New Sound, while Greep and Seth "Shank" Evans were in Brazil touring for the band Black Midi in November and December 2023. They used the studios at Estudio Do Tuto and Da Pá Virada in São Paulo for these recording sessions. While he was a member of Black Midi, Greep was noted for a heavy theatrical flair in his songwriting process, often with a strong narrative presence, which the Associated Press said was carried over into The New Sound.

Originally, Greep and Evans were planning to hold the sessions in London but they instead chose to record in Brazil due to the influences of Brazilian music on the composition of "Holy, Holy". He contacted a Brazilian he was familiar with and hired session musicians. These musicians refused the chord charts Greep gave them, saying they would not be needed, but as they started playing, Greep found that the song came out exactly how he wanted it to sound. Although they were initially planning to focus mainly on "Holy, Holy", Greep and the other musicians ended up recording three more songs during these sessions in São Paulo. Greep was quoted by Stereogum saying, "it was the first time it got better and better exponentially from the idea to the demo to the recording".

Prior to release, Greep was unsure of how "Holy, Holy" would be received; he heard the song hundreds of times during recording but had no perspective outside of himself and his friends on whether it would be liked. Before the announcement of The New Sound, Greep performed several solo live shows but did not play "Holy, Holy" at any of them. Greep told the website Post-Trash that this was because he believed that listeners would be better served hearing the studio recording of "Holy, Holy" first before any live version. Greep saw "Holy, Holy" as a song that required precision and enthusiasm when performing it, and he wanted to ensure that the crowd was enthusiastic before its live debut.

The single was released 10 days after Greep announced that his band Black Midi had broken up. The release of both "Holy, Holy" and The New Sound as a whole was supported by Rough Trade Records, the label which previously published Black Midi's discography.

== Composition and content ==
While chiefly defined in the progressive rock genre, "Holy, Holy" derives influence from funk, jazz fusion and art rock, as well as Brazilian bossa nova and Latin music such as salsa. "Holy, Holy" was further described by KXSC Radio as "[blending] post-punk, prog, funk, and latin jazz fusion". Writing for Pitchfork, Sam Goldner compared the song to Steely Dan and Pere Ubu. Krysta Fauria of the Associated Press described the single as "cacophonous, and somehow pleasing," which she cited as "evidence of Greep's idiosyncratic skill." "Holy, Holy" and the rest of the tracks on The New Sound were produced by Seth "Shank" Evans, with Greep credited as a co-producer.

The track, like many in The New Sound, was inspired by men Greep met while drinking at clubs and the stories they would tell him, sung from the point of view of a cartoonishly misogynist character. The song's chorus mentions the character being known by "jihadis", which Greep said was inspired by how Andrew Tate bragged about ISIS watching his videos. Greep also said that this archetype of man had "taken over the internet", a phenomenon he called frustrating. Shaad D'Souza of The Guardian wrote that while Greep's lyrics were satirical, the music felt earnest, supported by Greep's vocal performance being "in the style of a Broadway performer".

That's the whole thing, you can't let it completely become an ironic thing or a pessimistic thing or a satirical thing, because you lose a bit of the actual heart of it. At some point you have to say, well, why does this song actually exist, other than to take the piss out of people or just be stupid? That's why, in the same sentence sometimes, you're laughing, you're repulsed, and you also feel sorry. I wanted to make those things as hard to distinguish as possible.

— Geordie Greep

D'Souza also noted potential concerns over the song's lyrical content, but wrote that "Greep tries not to tailor his music to literal-minded people". Greep told Stereogum that creating the song was a hard sell, even to himself, and would have been difficult to pitch as a Black Midi release, in terms of both its instrumentation and lyrics. He described the thought process as "Oh, man, if this comes off wrong, it's bad news." Greep found that working solo, where he could "[have] a one-track vision and an uncompromising approach", worked best for songs on The New Sound, and especially in the case of "Holy, Holy".

Steve Erickson of Slant Magazine characterized the whole of The New Sound as a take on toxic masculinity, a description echoed and applied to "Holy, Holy" in particular, by SCAD Radio of Savannah College of Art and Design and WVUA-FM of the University of Alabama. Erickson wrote that "Holy, Holy" highlights the perspective of a "swaggering creep", additionally pointing out how the song's lyrics eventually reveal that the character being described in the song is only tolerated by women as long as he pays them. KXSC Radio also noted the progression of the song's narrative, and how the narrator's words "gradually expose the misogynistic insecurities that fuel his fabricated arrogance" the longer the track goes on. In a review for The Sydney Morning Herald, Robert Moran described "Holy, Holy" as part of the natural tension on The New Sound contrasting comedic, sexually desperate character portraits like that of "Holy, Holy", as opposed to other songs on the record, like Greep's cover of "If You Are But a Dream", which evoke a "tinge of sympathy".

== Music video ==
"Holy, Holy" is purposefully edited to depict Greep bowling consistent strikes, even as the editing becomes increasingly obvious.

The music video for "Holy, Holy" was released alongside the song on August 20, directed by Ethan Barrett and Tom Gullam (credited as simply "Ethan & Tom"). It was filmed at CJ's Bowling in Hockley, Essex, and presents Greep at a bowling alley, drinking cocktails while singing to the camera. The video was purposefully edited to show Greep scoring perfect strikes every time. Towards the end of the video, Greep walks into a billiard room and the video zooms in to a floating black square, where various casino signs and lights fly past in kaleidoscope-like imagery. Andrew MacGregor of David Reviews wrote regarding the music video: "the more we learn about Greep's character, however, the less convinced we are of his abilities on the lane".

== Reception ==
Upon its release online, "Holy, Holy" received critical acclaim from publications like Pitchfork, which designated the song with its "Best New Track" tag. In December 2024, Pitchfork ranked "Holy, Holy" as the 11th best song of the year. Will Schube for Flood Magazine praised "Holy, Holy" by writing, "this is batshit insane, and it's spectacular". Ethan Essner, writing for The Tufts Daily of Tufts University, described "Holy, Holy" as "one of the best new rock singles in years". In her review of The New Sound, Krysta Fauria of the Associated Press characterized "Holy, Holy" as "an all gas, no brakes musical trip across genre and around the world, that vacillates between euphoria and chaos". The website Beats Per Minute ranked "Holy, Holy" as the 42nd best song of 2024, with writer John Wohlmacher calling it "brilliant and as mean spirited as they come".

George Ward, the online editor for Clunk Magazine, favorably cited "Holy, Holy" as an example of Greep's "unrivalled storytelling", describing the song as "aggressive and confrontational" but also possessing lush and theatrical instrumentation, ultimately summarizing "Holy, Holy" as "one of the most ambitious beginnings to a solo career you'll ever hear". Robin Murray of Clash saw "Holy, Holy" as an "apt" beginning for Greep's solo career, combining "lingering shades" of Black Midi with "something different, something singular".

== Personnel ==
Credits are adapted from the liner notes of The New Sound.

=== Musicians ===
- Geordie Greep – vocals, synthesizers, guitars, fretless bass guitar
- Felix Gonzalez – backing vocals
- Seth "Shank" Evans – backing vocals
- Fabio Sá – bass guitar
- Thiaguinho Silva – drums
- Chicão Montorfano – electric piano
- Dennys Silva – percussion
- Deschanel Gordon – Bechstein piano
- Diarra Walcott-Ivanhoe – Steinway piano
- Deji Ijishakin – saxophone
- Joe Bristow – trombone
- Matt Seddon – trombone
- Billy Rowlatt – trumpet
- Freddie Wordsworth – trumpet

=== Production ===
- Seth "Shank" Evans – production
- Geordie Greep – co–production, horn arrangements
- Nathan Boddy – mastering, mixing
- Rafa Barreto – engineering
- Sid Souza – engineering
- Thiago "Big" Rabello – engineering
- Victor Neri – engineering
- Simone Gallazio – engineering
