= Debbie Elliott =

American journalist

Deborah "Debbie" Elliott is an American broadcast journalist for NPR, who covers news events in the American South.

She attended graduate school at the University of Alabama, where she worked for WUAL-FM radio (which later joined other stations in forming Alabama Public Radio). Afterwards, she established her reputation as a stringer for NPR on the U.S. Gulf Coast.

From 2005 to 2007, she was the host of Weekend All Things Considered. On September 2, 2007, she announced her decision to step down from the program. Former NPR Congressional reporter Andrea Seabrook replaced Elliot as WATC host. Elliot then reported on the 2008 presidential campaign and the United States Congress before returning to the South in 2009.
