= WHIL (FM) =

Classical music public radio station in Mobile, Alabama

- Mobile, Alabama; United States
- Frequency: 91.3 MHz

Programming
- Format: Public radio, talk and classical
- Affiliations: Alabama Public Radio; NPR; BBC World Service

Ownership
- Owner: University of Alabama; (The Board of Trustees of the University of Alabama)

History
- First air date: August 29, 1974
- Former call signs: WHIL-FM (1974–2016)
- Call sign meaning: Spring Hill College (former owner)

Technical information
- Licensing authority: FCC
- Facility ID: 61999
- Class: C
- ERP: 100,000 watts
- HAAT: 325 meters (1,066 ft)
- Transmitter coordinates: 30°41′20″N 87°49′49″W

Links
- Public license information: Public file; LMS
- Website: APR.org

WHIL (91.3 FM) is a non-commercial radio station licensed to Mobile, Alabama, United States. An affiliate of Alabama Public Radio's "News and Classics" network and a member of National Public Radio (NPR), it is a public radio outlet with news and talk programming, classical music in middays and evenings, and the BBC World Service in late nights. Studios are located on the fourth floor of the Digital Media Center inside the North End Zone of Saban Field at Digital Media Center on the campus of the University of Alabama on Paul W. Bryant Drive in Tuscaloosa.

WHIL's transmitter tower is on Austin Lane in Spanish Fort. WHIL's signal covers an area centered at the southern part of Alabama along the Gulf of Mexico Coast, stretching from Pascagoula, Mississippi, to Pensacola, Florida.

== History ==
=== Spring Hill College ===
WHIL-FM signed on the air on August 29, 1974. It was owned by Spring Hill College, a Roman Catholic Jesuit institution that held the broadcast license. The HIL in its call sign reflects the name "Spring Hill." In its early years, WHIL-FM was the student radio station. The studio was in the Spring Hill Student Center. Operations were overseen by faculty advisors with student station managers and program directors. Generally, students programmed their own shows, leaning towards 60s/70s rock and some late-night jazz. The school converted the station from student-run to public radio, primarily playing classical music, with some news and educational programs.

Only a week after its debut, Hurricane Frederic struck the Alabama Gulf Coast, rendering the station silent for weeks due to transmitter and tower damage. From those rough beginnings, the station grew to provide one of the few non-commercial radio services available to the region, apart from Christian talk and teaching stations. In later years, it used the branding "Fine Arts Radio for the Gulf Coast," a summary of its mission and scope. It later became a member of National Public Radio and added some NPR programming.

Of the public radio stations and networks located in Alabama, WHIL-FM was the only one not operated by an agency or educational institution of the state. It was the fourth chronologically, after Huntsville's WLRH, Birmingham's WBHM, and Troy's WTSU; only Tuscaloosa (Alabama Public Radio) came later, in 1982.

=== Dispute over NPR programming ===
In the mid-to-late 1990s, Spring Hill College officials took exception to some news reports on National Public Radio about subjects such as abortion rights and homosexuality. Because these seemed to run counter to the moral positions of the Roman Catholic order of the Society of Jesus, the parent organization of the college, WHIL-FM discontinued airing NPR news programs for several years. Protests from disappointed listeners prompted WHIL-FM to restore Morning Edition, but the station continued to preempt All Things Considered in favor of classical music and Public Radio International's Marketplace.

However, in response to a survey of local public radio listeners, WHIL-FM returned All Things Considered to its schedule in early 2007.

=== Alabama Public Radio ===
On March 21, 2011, Spring Hill College and University of Alabama officials announced the sale of the station to UA. WHIL-FM began carrying the programming of Alabama Public Radio on July 1, 2011. This move reflected increasing consolidation in non-commercial radio, a situation largely occurring because of the economic factors.

On June 14, 2016, the station changed its call sign from WHIL-FM to the current WHIL.
