= WVUA =

WVUA may refer to:

- WVUA (TV), a television station (channel 6, virtual channel 23) licensed to Tuscaloosa, Alabama, serving the Birmingham–Tuscaloosa–Anniston market
- WVUA-CD, a television station (channel 23, virtual channel 7) licensed to Tuscaloosa/Northport, Alabama
- WVUA-FM, a radio station (90.7 FM) licensed to Tuscaloosa, Alabama
