= The New Sound =

Studio album by Geordie Greep
- Released: 4 October 2024
- Recorded: September 2023 – April 2024
- Studios: RAK (London); Fish Factory (London); Hermitage Works (London); New Sound (London); HOXA HQ (London); Estudio Do Tuto (São Paulo); Da Pá Virada (São Paulo)
- Genres: Progressive rock; jazz-rock; art rock; bossa nova; jazz
- Length: 62:55
- Label: Rough Trade
- Producer: Seth Evans

Singles from The New Sound
- 1. "Holy, Holy" Released: 20 August 2024; 2. "Blues" Released: 1 October 2024

The New Sound is the debut solo studio album by English musician Geordie Greep, released on 4 October 2024 on Rough Trade Records. The New Sound was produced by Black Midi touring and session member Seth Evans, with co-production from Greep. The album was recorded in London and São Paulo between September 2023 and April 2024. Black Midi, the band Greep had led since 2017, went public with their indefinite hiatus in August 2024. Days after, he announced the release of The New Sound, alongside its lead single "Holy, Holy".

The New Sound encompasses several stylistic influences, from progressive rock and jazz-rock to Brazilian music and Latin rock, while its satirical lyrics focus on themes of masculinity and desperation, taking the perspective of characters Greep wrote. The album received acclaim from music critics, with praise directed at Greep's songwriting.

== Background ==
Prior to beginning a solo career, Greep fronted the band Black Midi, and was known for his songwriting style emphasizing strong narratives. These songs often contained a "heavy theatrical flair", and the Associated Press wrote that many of these characteristics were carried over into The New Sound. The New Yorker described Greep as sounding "refreshed" on The New Sound, in reference to the album's similarities with Greep's tenure in Black Midi. On 30 March 2024, Greep played his debut solo show at The Windmill in Brixton, billed as "Geordie Greep and the Swing Boys", where he played new material which would eventually make the album.

On 10 August 2024, Greep abruptly announced that Black Midi had been on an indefinite hiatus, and that the band had internally split up long before he made it public. Ten days later, on 20 August, Greep revealed The New Sound for the first time, and released the single "Holy, Holy". The album cover is an illustration by Japanese artist Toshio Saeki; Greep said he chose the artwork for its qualities as a "crossover between beauty and perversion".

== Recording ==
Greep recorded the album in London and São Paulo between September 2023 and April 2024, with the help of over thirty musicians. The album's recording sessions spanned "eight or nine" days in total during this period, with Greep describing the process as "little chunks here and there rather than like a huge prolonged thing."

Recording began in September 2023 at RAK Studios in London, where "Blues", "Walk Up", and "Motorbike" were recorded. "The Magician" was recorded at Fish Factory Studios and was the last song Greep and Evans recorded prior to Black Midi resuming their tour. "The Magician" and "Walk Up" were originally Black Midi songs that were performed live but did not make it to a studio album before the band's hiatus. Black Midi drummer Morgan Simpson is featured on several tracks, as is touring musician Seth "Shank" Evans, who produced the album and performs lead vocals on "Motorbike".

Greep and Evans chose to hold recording sessions for "Holy, Holy" in São Paulo due to the influences of Brazilian music on the song's composition. The sessions took place at Estudio Do Tuto and Da Pá Virada in November and December 2023 while Greep and Evans were on tour with Black Midi in Brazil. Greep hired session musicians and lined up the recording days with the help of a contact he had in Brazil. During recording, the session musicians refused to use the planned chord charts for "Holy, Holy", finding them unnecessary. However, Greep stated that they ended up playing the song exactly as he had envisioned it. Greep and Evans initially planned on solely recording "Holy, Holy" in São Paulo, but found themselves working on four songs in total due to the success they had during these sessions, as Greep said that he was very satisfied with how the São Paulo sessions turned out.

Greep and Evans resumed recording in March 2024 at Fish Factory, where they recorded "The New Sound", "Bongo Season", and "If You Are But a Dream". Overdubs for the album were also recorded at Hermitage Works Studios, New Sound Studios, and HOXA HQ in London. The final overdubs were recorded at New Sound Studios in April 2024.

== Music and lyrics ==
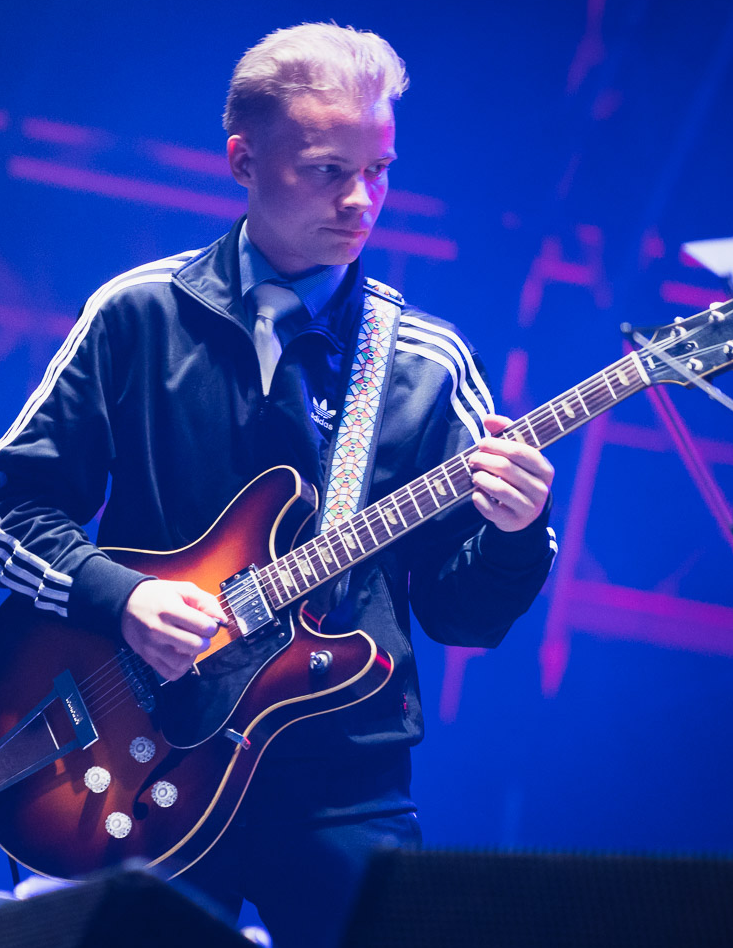
Greep, pictured performing in 2021, received praise for the songwriting on The New Sound, with Pitchfork comparing his satirical style to Randy Newman.

=== Style and influences ===
The New Sound was described by WVUA-FM as the best "prog-rock albums of the year" and a "chaotic jazz-rock album marked by deceptive satire" with "rhythmically complex arrangements of bossa nova, jazz, and art rock". It also draws heavy inspiration from Brazilian music, including bossa nova, MPB and samba, as well as Latin rock. In describing The New Sound's influences, The Quietus highlighted Greep's admiration of Brazilian musician Naná Vasconcelos and his 1980 album Saudades, while Pitchfork described The New Sound as containing disparate "aesthetic trappings" of Milton Nascimento, John Abercrombie, Pat Metheny and Led Zeppelin.

The album's opening track "Blues" is primarily a collaboration between Greep, Evans, and Black Midi drummer Morgan Simpson. Greep said he wanted to keep its composition "loose", and only played the song in full for the first time during recording. This was due to the influence of Léo Ferré, as Greep was specifically inspired by how Ferré would expand on simple thematic starting points. The album's closing track is a cover of the 1940s song "If You Are But a Dream". Greep said he wanted to take the song, which he regarded as "brilliant" after hearing it for the first time, in the direction of "a Salvation Army brass band vibe, like Tom Waits or something".

=== Lyrics ===
The lyrics on The New Sound center around satirical character studies, with a particular focus on "desperation", which Greep called the main theme of the album. Greep aimed to show, not tell "how bad it is", in describing each character's delusional fantasies and desires. These characters were inspired by men that Greep met out drinking at clubs and the stories that they would tell him. Greep said that even though these characters may be "desperate" or "disgusting", he wanted to create some amount of pity or empathy for them from the listener, as "it's very powerful when you can relate or empathise with someone you detest". Greep also stated that he never drew from his own personal experiences in designing the album's themes, instead thinking about questions like "When this guy leaves his bar, what does he do? Then, what is the rest of his life like?"

"Holy, Holy" is an example of one song that demonstrates the theme of desperation, taking the perspective of a hyper-masculine man, as the narrator's words "gradually expose the misogynistic insecurities that fuel his fabricated arrogance", according to KXSC Radio. Greep said that the archetype of man explored in "Holy, Holy" and other songs had "taken over the internet", a phenomenon he called frustrating.

Robert Moran of The Sydney Morning Herald observed a tension on The New Sound between sickly humorous character studies like that of "Holy, Holy" and more sympathetic songs like Greep's cover of "If You Are But a Dream", which create a "tinge of sympathy" for the same character previously being mocked. Greep confirmed that this was intentional, saying, "That's why, in the same sentence sometimes, you're laughing, you're repulsed, and you also feel sorry. I wanted to make those things as hard to distinguish as possible." Bryson Edward Howe of The Big Ship wrote that while Greep's characters may swim "in a murky self-awareness that invites more empathy than it perhaps deserves", this was part of the narrative design of the album, with Greep attempting to strike a reasonable balance of satire without being a "complete parody" to the point of cruelty.

Additionally, Greep said that he was attempting to emulate the feeling of yearning, "where it's something you're reaching but you can't get", and the tension involved with it. This was something Greep was already drawn to in music and was able to focus on with the album's lyrical themes. Greep likened "writing an entire album from the perspective of pathetic men" to "going down a rabbit hole", and chose this topic because he thought it was something not often explored.

Slant Magazine described the album's lyrical content as a take on toxic masculinity, while SCAD Radio of Savannah College of Art and Design characterized it as Greep "[tearing] down the manosphere". Shaad D'Souza of The Guardian wrote that while Greep's lyrics were satirical, the music felt earnest, supported by Greep's vocal performance being "in the style of a Broadway performer".

== Release and promotion ==
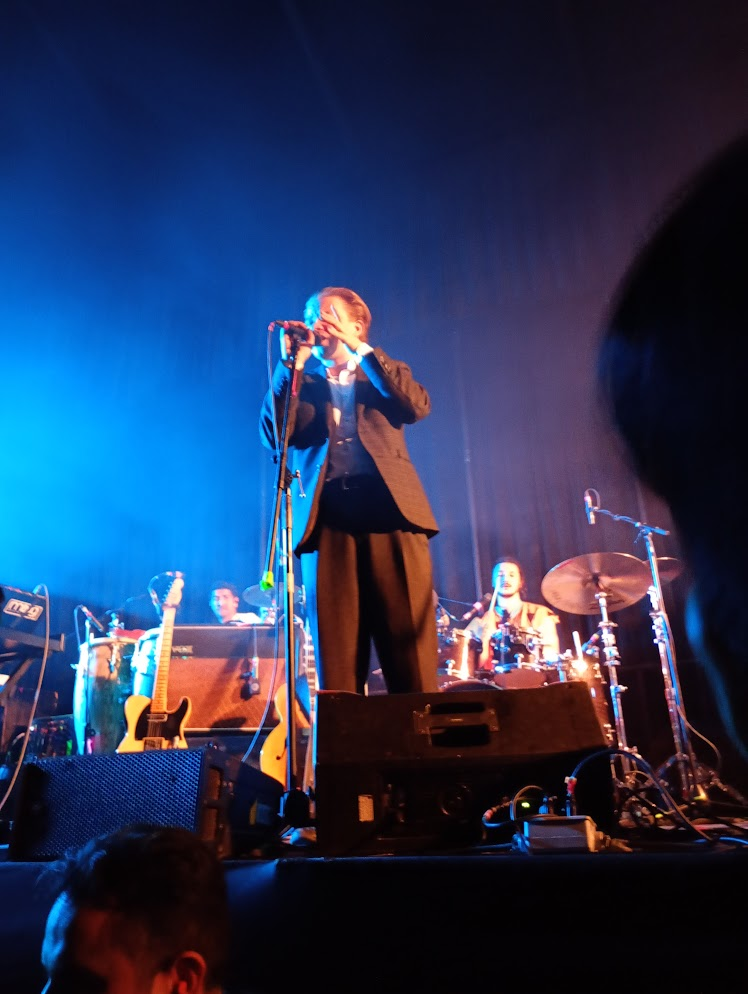
Greep, in 2025, during his album tour in Mexico City.

To release the album, Greep signed a one-album deal with Rough Trade Records, who had previously released each of Black Midi's studio albums: "I got a one-album deal with Rough Trade, and that was after I'd already done most of the recording. The album was basically finished, but then the producer [Seth Evans] had to pay a mixing engineer, so I went to Rough Trade and it was great. They said, 'Alright, the album's already done, so that's it.' There was no 'It needs a single' or anything. It's never been like that with them anyway."

Greep announced a listening party for the album on 9 September 2024 at Williamsburg Pizza in the Bushwick neighborhood of Brooklyn, New York. Winners of a raffle were given the chance to listen to the album a month before its release with Greep in a trolley across Brooklyn. Later that week, Greep made his live solo debut in the United States with four shows in New York City held in four different small venues, joined by a backing band of percussionist Santiago Moyano, drummer Charlie Schefft, bassist David Strawn and keyboardist Cameron Campbell. The New Sound was released on 4 October 2024 through Rough Trade Records on 2xLP and CD.

Greep also added an October–December 2024 tour of Europe, a winter 2025 tour of the United States, February 2025 dates in Japan and further spring 2025 dates in the United States.

== Critical reception ==
Professional ratings
Aggregate scores
Source	Rating
Metacritic	81/100
Review scores
Source	Rating
Clash	8/10
Loud and Quiet	10/10
MusicOMH	4.5/5 stars
NME	3/5 stars
Our Culture Mag	4/5 stars
Slant Magazine	4/5 stars
Pitchfork	7.2/10

According to the review aggregator Metacritic, The New Sound received "universal acclaim" based on a weighted average score of 81 out of 100 from 12 critic scores.

Writing for Our Culture Mag, Konstantinos Pappis praised The New Sound by saying "beyond the irreverence and debauchery of it all, something about where Greep leaves things cuts right to the bone" and described the "unusually poignant" lyrics of songs like "The Magician", while also acknowledging that the record's themes can potentially evoke "a difficult feeling to engage with for an entire album".

Huw Baines from NME noted that the record was "not necessarily trying to be clever – more that the sheer weight of its many ideas crushes the more visceral response that its obvious instrumental swagger demands from its listener."

The Sydney Morning Herald declared of The New Sound that "the incel era finally has its first classic album", detailing how Greep "skewers" the characters who narrate the album's songs, while noting the nuance between mocking the "twisted, deluded, undesired" narrators, at the same time evoking sympathy for the same characters who are lost in a "solemn fantasy". Reviewer Robert Moran described the album's composition as "ever-challenging" and "filled with intricate instrumentation and spitting verbiage".

Cal Cashin of Loud and Quiet gave the album a perfect score, commenting that The New Sound was "somehow bolder, stranger and more accessible than [Greep's] work with Black Midi", which Cashin called a "remarkable feat".

Rolling Stone placed The New Sound among the 50 best indie rock album released in 2024, while it ranked at number six on Loud and Quiet's "Albums of the Year 2024" list. The New Sound topped Mike Mineo's list of the best albums of 2024 for Obscure Sound. The New Sound was also included on various other year-end "best of" lists for 2024, including by Slant Magazine and Under the Radar.

== Track listing ==
All tracks are written by Geordie Greep, except where noted.

The New Sound track listing
No.	Title	Writer(s)	Length
1.	"Blues"		5:42
2.	"Terra"		4:18
3.	"Holy, Holy"		6:03
4.	"The New Sound"		4:47
5.	"Walk Up"		4:25
6.	"Through a War"	Geordie Greep; Seth Evans	5:44
7.	"Bongo Season"		2:35
8.	"Motorbike" (featuring Seth Evans)	Geordie Greep; Seth Evans	6:01
9.	"As If Waltz"		7:53
10.	"The Magician"		12:20
11.	"If You Are But a Dream"	Jack Fulton; Moe Jaffe; Nal Bonx	3:07
Total length:			62:55

2xLP Bonus 7" Vinyl Edition singles
No.	Title	Length
12.	"I Love My Family"	4:08
13.	"Aching Knees"	3:38
Total length:		70:21

== Personnel ==
=== Musicians ===
- Geordie Greep - acoustic & electric guitar; vocals (1-3, 5-7, 9-11), synthesizers (tracks 1-3, 5, 6, 8-10), accordion (tracks 2, 9, 10), fretless bass guitar (track 3), organ (tracks 4, 5), piano (tracks 5, 6, 9, 10), keyboards (tracks 5, 6), electric piano (tracks 7, 10), additional bass guitar (track 10)
- Seth "Shank" Evans - bass guitar (tracks 1, 5, 8, 10), vocals (tracks 3, 8), talkbox (tracks 5), oboe (tracks 9), piano (tracks 8, 10), percussion (track 10)
- Morgan Simpson - drums (tracks 1, 5, 8)
- Adé Eggún Crispin Robinson - percussion (tracks 1, 4, 5, 7, 8)
- Deschanel Gordon - piano (tracks 1-3, 5, 6, 8)
- Diarra Walcott-Ivanhoe - piano (tracks 2, 3, 7, 11)
- Thiaguinho Silva - drums (tracks 2, 3, 6, 9), percussion (track 6)
- Fabio Sá - bass guitar (tracks 2, 3, 6, 9)
- Dennys Silva - percussion (tracks 2, 3, 9)
- Felix Stephens - cello (track 2)
- Chicao Montorfano - electric piano (tracks 3, 6, 9)
- Felix Gonzalez - vocals (track 3)
- Deji Ijishakin - saxophone (tracks 3, 5, 6, 8)
- Daniel Rogerson - guitar (tracks 4, 7)
- Giles King-Ashong - drums (tracks 4, 7)
- Michael Dunlop - bass guitar (tracks 4, 7)
- John Jones - double bass solo (track 4)
- Paul Jones - guitar solo (track 9), double bass (track 11)
- Andrei Martynchyk - drums (track 10)

Horn ensemble (tracks 1-4, 6, 11)

- Billy Rowlatt - trumpet
- Freddie Wordsworth - trumpet
- Joe Bristow - trombone
- Matt Seddon - trombone

String quartet (tracks 9, 10)

- Nina Lim - violin
- Kuari May - violin
- Freya Hicks - viola
- Felix Stephens - cello

=== Technical ===
- Seth "Shank" Evans – production
- Geordie Greep – co–production; horn arrangements (tracks 1–4, 6)
- Nathan Boddy – mastering, mixing
- Liam Hebb – engineering (tracks 1, 5, 8)
- Margo Broom – engineering (tracks 1, 5, 8)
- Nathan Ridley – engineering (tracks 1, 5, 8)
- Rafa Barreto – engineering (tracks 2, 3, 9)
- Sid Souza – engineering (tracks 2, 3, 9)
- Thiago "Big" Rabello – engineering (tracks 2, 3, 9)
- Victor Neri – engineering (tracks 2, 3, 9)
- Simone Gallazio – engineering (tracks 3, 4, 7, 10, 11)
- Tuto Ferraz – engineering (track 6)
- Felix Stephens – string arrangements (tracks 9, 10)
- Harvey Grant – special arrangement for horns, piano, double bass, and vocal (track 11)

== Charts ==
Chart performance for The New Sound
Chart (2024)	Peak position
Croatian International Albums (HDU)	3
Portuguese Albums (AFP)	89
Scottish Albums (Official Charts)	28
UK Albums (Official Charts)	84
UK Album Downloads (Official Charts)	23
UK Independent Albums (Official Charts)	10
