= The Worm (HMLTD album) =

Studio album by HMLTD
- Released: 7 April 2023
- Studios: Wormhole, Pony, Dock, Hermitage Works, RAK, Crouch End and Sleeper Sound (London); Mike's Manhole (Hastings); Antart and Artracks (Athens)
- Genres: Art rock; rock opera; progressive rock
- Length: 41:28
- Label: Lucky Number Music
- Producer: HMLTD

HMLTD chronology
West of Eden (2020)	The Worm (2023)	Fangs (2026)

Singles from The Worm
- 1. "Wyrmlands" Released: 31 January 2023; 2. "The End Is Now" Released: 7 March 2023; 3. "The Worm" Released: 4 April 2023; 4. "Days" Released: 15 May 2023

The Worm is the second studio album by British art-rock band HMLTD. It was released on 7 April 2023 on Lucky Number Music. It is a rock opera style concept album about a worm swallowing England.

Three singles were released in the weeks ahead of the album's release: "Wyrmlands", "The End of Now" and "The Worm". They all have music videos directed by front man Henry Spychalski.

== Concept ==
The Worm is a loose concept album set in an anachronistic version of Medieval England. Its populace is in peril, because the titular worm is bound to swallow them. According to Spychalski, the first single "Wyrmlands" "tells the story of a guerrilla resistance movement against the Worm. The lyrics recount their tales of subversion and subterfuge: counter-offensives, tortured confessions and haunting vignettes of the strange new land in which they find themselves." In "The End Is Now", the worm has awoken and is about to swallow the English countryside. The stripped-back ballad "Days" is a more intimate view into the mind of anti-worm leader Henry Spychalski. It references to a love interest whom he lost through the worm. "Saddest Worm Ever" makes repeated references to the efforts of killing the worm. The repeated line 'like a gun to the head' hints at a possible connection between the worm and depression. The Grunter Rebels, led by Spychalski, are briefly mentioned. Their crime, grunting and consuming worms, is punishable by death.

"Liverpool Street" breaks with the clear narrative chronology of the story. A spoken word narration, possibly made by a psychiatrist of a mental institution, is diagnosing Spychalski with "extremely volatile behaviour". It is revealed that he cannot distinguish between real and symbolic figures in the mind. The worm could therefore be interpreted as a stand-in for a mental illness, most likely depression. In order to overcome his struggle, Spychalski has to kill the worm. This battle is depicted from his point of view in the title track, "The Worm". Here, the worm is said to be "deep within yourselves" and to "swallow worlds". Spychalski called the song "the clearest admission that the album is a symbol of my depression and battle with it". The longest song on album, "Past Life (Sinnerman's Song)" makes heavy references to religion and advised the narrator to "keep the faith". The spoken-word outro is depicting a cat cutting a worm in half. The narrator kneels down and brings the worm outside. He repeats "life is beautiful", showing Spychalskis process of healing. The closer "Lay Me Down" is a hopeful song in that according to Spychalski "[t]he narrator’s overcome his delusions and his demons [...] [he] made peace with himself. It’s a song at the end of the world."

== Music ==
The Worm covers a lot of different styles throughout the album. While single "Wyrmlands" with its heavy use of jazz instrumentation was often compared to adjacent South London band Black Midi, "The End is Now" is an art pop song that features a gospel choir. "Days" and "Liverpool Street" are relatively stripped-back piano ballads. "Saddest Worm Ever" is a art-rock song similar to the 2007 Radiohead album In Rainbows. Later the track list, "The Worm" and "Past Life (Sinnerman's Song)" are structured more like musical theatre performances. To end up the album, HMLTD chose to give closer "Lay Me Down" a more hopeful song structure.

== Reception ==
Professional ratings
Aggregate scores
Source	Rating
Metacritic	86/100
Review scores
Source	Rating
DIY	4/5 stars
The Guardian	4/5 stars
The Line of Best Fit	9/10
Loud and Quiet	8/10
Louder Than War	4.5/5 stars
The Skinny	4/5 stars
The Telegraph	4/5 stars

The Worm was well received by music critics upon release. On review aggregator website Metacritic, the album has an average critic score of 86 out of 100, based on five critics.

Writing for The Telegraph, British music critic Andrew Perry welcomed the experimentation deployed on the album. He wrote: "As a 40-minute listening experience, it's equal parts eccentric and impassioned, thought-provoking and out-there – if not exactly fun, given the mental-health issues, then certainly liberating, nourishing and thoroughly memorable." In a similar positive review for The Line of Best Fit, Caitlin Chatterton complimented that despite its short runtime, The Worm "expertly treads the line between fantasy and realism, between pretension and honesty, and wraps it all up before you've had time to raise an eyebrow."

Ammar Kalia writing for The Guardian praised the album's unifying theme. which "can lead tracks such as the riff-heavy Wyrmlands into musical theatre territory as Spychalski crams lyrics amid instrumental virtuosity." For Kalia, it shows HMLTD "as a band capable of committing to grand visions with brilliant intensity."

== Track listing ==
The Worm track listing
No.	Title	Writer(s)	Length
1.	"Worm's Dream"	Achilleas Sarantaris, Duc Peterman, Henry Spychalski, Seth Evans	1:14
2.	"Wyrmlands"	Abigail Morris, Sarantaris, Peterman, Spychalski, James Donovan, Evans	3:51
3.	"The End Is Now"	Justin Tranter, Morris, Sarantaris, Peterman, Spychalski, Donovan, Jazz Alonso, Nicolas Mohnblatt, Rhys Downing, Evans	3:58
4.	"Days"	Morris, Sarantaris, Peterman, Spychalski, James Donovan, Evans	4:30
5.	"Saddest Worm Ever"	Morris, Sarantaris, Peterman, Spychalski, Donovan, Mohnblatt, Evans	5:30
6.	"Liverpool Street"	Sarantaris, Peterman, Spychalski, Evans	4:55
7.	"The Worm"	Morris, Sarantaris, Peterman, Spychalski, Donovan, Evans	5:18
8.	"Past Life (Sinnerman's Song)"	Morris, Sarantaris, Peterman, Spychalski, Donovan, Evans	7:17
9.	"Lay Me Down"	Morris, Sarantaris, Peterman, Gianluca Buccellati, Spychalski, Donovan, Mohnblatt, Evans	4:55
Total length:			41:28

== Personnel ==
HMLTD

- Achilleas Sarantaris – drums
- Henry Spychalski – vocals
- Duc Peterman – guitar
- Seth Evans– keyboard

Guest musicians

- Abigail Morris from the Last Dinner Party – backing vocals (2–5, 9)
- Andrei Martynchik – drums (2–3)
- Andrea Grant – choir (1, 7–8)
- Daniel Thomas – choir (1, 7–8)
- Dimitris Papadopoulos – trumpet (7)
- Georgios Kontogiannis – cretan lyra (3, 5–6)
- Immanuel Simelane – bass guitar (2, 8)
- James Donovan – guitar (2–5, 7–9), backing vocals (6), 12-string guitar (3, 5, 7)
- Jazz Alonso – backing vocals (3–4)
- Jim Staridas – trombone (7)
- Kalliopi Mitropoulou – violin (5–9), backing vocals (6)
- Kyriakos Tapakis – oud (5)
- Nicolas Mohnblatt – bass guitar (2–3, 5, 9), backing vocals (5)
- Nikos Paraoulakis – ney (5)
- Rhys Downing – backing vocals (3), additional vocal production (3)
- The Sixteen Unnamed Soldiers of the Greek Worm Orchestra – cello (5–7, 9), double bass (5–7, 9), violin (5–7, 9), viola (5–7, 9)
- T. Jale Cole – choir (1, 7, 9)
- Wendi Rose – choir (1, 7, 9)
- Yannis Kassetas – baritone (5, 7), alto saxophone (5, 7)

Production

- Caesar Edmunds – mixing (1–9), engineering (2, 4, 9)
- Clyde Jabra – engineering (3, 5, 7–9), additional percussion (8)
- Darren Jones – engineering (1, 3, 7–8)
- Matt Colton – mastering (1–9)
- Mike Horner – engineering (1–9)
- Nathan Ridley – engineering (2, 4, 6–9), additional engineering (6, 9)
- Nikos Goudinakis – engineering (5–7, 9)
- Rollo Smallcombe – additional engineering (8)
- Sotiris Ziliaskopoulos – engineering (5)

Artwork and graphic design

- Henry Spychalski – artwork
- Mike Raymond – graphic design
