= WLRH =

Public radio station in Huntsville, Alabama

- Huntsville, Alabama; United States
- Broadcast area: Tennessee Valley
- Frequency: 89.3 MHz (HD Radio)
- Branding: 89.3 FM/HD Huntsville Public Radio

Programming
- Format: Classical music/News (Public)
- Subchannels: HD2: Classical music HD3: News/Talk

Ownership
- Owner: Alabama Educational Television Commission

History
- First air date: October 13, 1976
- Call sign meaning: Library Radio Huntsville

Technical information
- Licensing authority: FCC
- Facility ID: 719
- Class: C0
- ERP: 100,000 watts
- HAAT: 319.2 meters (1,047 ft)
- Transmitter coordinates: 34°44′12.7″N 86°31′45.3″W
- Translator: 104.5 W283CM (Henager)

Links
- Public license information: Public file; LMS
- Webcast: Main HD 1 Classical HD 2 News and Talk HD 3
- Website: wlrh.org

WLRH (89.3 FM), branded as "WLRH 89.3 FM/HD Huntsville," is an American public radio station located in Huntsville, Alabama, the state's first such broadcaster. It offers music, news, cultural and entertainment programming from American Public Media, the Public Radio Exchange, and other nationally-recognized public media outlets, as well as airing several local shows produced by staff and volunteers. Until October 1, 2025, it also aired programming from National Public Radio until the station dropped programming from the network due to a decision by station owner Alabama Public Television. WLRH provides three HD channels. The HD1 signal is a digital version of the main WLRH signal, the HD2 signal is a 24-hour classical music service, and the HD3 signal provides news and talk programs. WLRH serves an area roughly 60 miles in all directions from its transmitter on Monte Sano Mountain, located on the city's eastern end, including north-central Alabama and south-central Tennessee, as well as northeastern Alabama (Fort Payne) via a translator.

== History ==
For many years, Huntsville has boasted a large population of highly-educated, affluent professionals. Among them are technicians, engineers, and entrepreneurs mostly associated with the U.S. Army's Redstone Arsenal installation, NASA's George C. Marshall Space Flight Center and contractors. Many of these individuals were responsible for organizing an unusually high-quality performing arts scene for such a small city in the 1960s. These were among the factors that led to Huntsville receiving Alabama's first public radio license, and broadcasts began on October 13, 1976 from the Times Building on Holmes Avenue. The state's largest city at the time, Birmingham, followed suit two months later when WBHM started in December.

The station was originally owned by the Huntsville Madison County Public Library; in fact, the call letters stand for Library Radio Huntsville. However, just over a year after the station began operations, it became apparent that the library's budget could not properly support a full-service radio station, especially one in what has always been a modest-sized market. The Alabama Educational Television Commission stepped in and acquired the station in December 1977 to prevent it from failing, and still owns it today. The station carried, as was customary for public stations during that era, mostly classical music programming, with jazz late nights Mondays through Saturdays; some folk music and radio drama programs were mixed in during the week. In 1987, after significant listener growth, the University of Alabama in Huntsville offered the AETC use of a newly constructed facility on its campus, several miles to the west of downtown; WLRH took the offer and remains at that location today. WLRH otherwise has no direct connection to UAH, as that institution does not have a broadcasting curriculum.

In the early years, the station carried some unusual programs, most notably Radio Andernach, a weekly hour-long German-language news and features show for the benefit of several natives of that land who worked in Huntsville's aerospace and defense industry. Beginning in the mid-1980s, it also was the home of northern Alabama's first call-in radio talk show, which had a very different flavor than most of those found on commercial stations today (in fact, when the format's popularity exploded elsewhere in the 1990s, WLRH dropped the show).

In 2010 WLRH added 89.3 HD2, a 24-hour classical music service. It added 89.3 HD3, a news/talk outlet, in 2012.

WLRH added a translator at 104.5 FM in Henagar, Alabama in 2018.

On September 5, 2025, WLRH announced that they would be dropping NPR programming on October 1st and return to a local-driven focus.

== Programming ==
=== Station staff ===
- Marsha Arends - On-Air Host and Producer
- Erich Brukner - General Manager
- Lisa Chang - Manager of Development and Community Engagement
- Brad Edwards - Host of Terra Beats
- Nate Emery - Assistant Broadcast Director
- Katy Ganaway - Program Director and Host of Arts Underground
- Alex Hall - On-Air Host and Program Producer
- Sonni Hood - On-Air Talent and Digital Content Producer
- Skarlett Karsen - Host of The Graveyard Shift
- Mike Keeley - Host of Morning Blend
- Bob Nance - Producer
- Elaine Oakes - Corporate Underwriting and Support Manager
- Captain Thomas Quin - Former host of The Graveyard Shift
- Ryan "R.L." Terry - Mornning Host and News Director

=== Volunteer hosts and programs ===
- Bob Labbe- Reelin' in the Years
- "Microwave Dave" Gallaher- former host of Talkin' the Blues
- John Hightower- Brass, Reeds, and Percussion
- Brad Posey- The Invisible City

=== Local programming ===
- Valley Sounds-- Hosted by Nate Emery, this all-local music show shines the spotlight on original music of all genres created and performed in the Tennessee Valley. Each hour-long episode contains a mix of music, interviews and other special segments that provide insight on the creative process of making and performing music. Valley Sounds is available as a podcast and airs Saturdays at 9 p.m.
- The Public Radio Hour-- This is a weekly mix of special programs and homemade radio features that seeks the untold story about ideas that matter. This show is hosted by Brett Tannehill and Katy Ganaway and produced in part by WLRH Community Newsroom volunteers. This program airs every Thursday at 7 p.m. and is also available as a podcast.
- The Sundial Writers Corner-- is one of WLRH's longest-running programs. For more than 20 years, Sundial has featured prose, poetry, commentaries, and short stories, submitted by Tennessee Valley wordsmiths and told in the voice of the author. Many Sundial writers have received awards at the state and national level. The Sundial Writers Corner airs Mondays at 9 a.m., right after Tennessee Valley Mornings, and is available as a podcast. The program was based on a long-running Saturday-morning program that aired during the 1980s and 1990s on the station.
- Arts Underground- Features independent music, comedy, and art from the Tennessee Valley and around the world. Airs Saturdays from 2-3 PM.
- Reelin' in the Years--hosted by former WAAY-TV sports anchor Bob Labbe, this Friday-night show features songs from the host's extensive collection of 45 R.P.M. records, covering popular music from the 1950s through the 1980s.
- Brass, Reeds, and Percussion--the longest-running specialty show on the station, dating from 1976. The program features concert and marching band numbers and may be the only one of its kind in the entire country. The program is heard early Saturday afternoons. Darryl Adams, a local engineer and band musician, hosted the show from its inception until his death in October 2011. The show is currently hosted by John Hightower.
- Talkin' the Blues--a one-hour examination, heard Saturday evenings, of various aspects of blues music, hosted by a blues musician himself, "Microwave Dave" Gallaher. Gallaher, whose band, Microwave Dave and the Nukes, performs throughout the Southeastern U.S., in fact began the program while performing during a pledge drive for the station once. Gallaher also does another version of this show for Huntsville's other public station, WJAB, the Alabama A&M University NPR outlet.
- The Invisible City--two hours of alternative rock music, hosted by Brad Posey, and heard Friday evenings, with a repeat on late night Saturdays.

== Operations ==
WLRH is the Alabama Educational Television Commission's only radio property; that state government agency is better known as the operator of the Alabama Public Television network (seen in the WLRH listening area on WHIQ-TV, channel 25).

One distinctive programming practice of WLRH is its frequent announcements throughout the broadcast day of underwriting day sponsorships made by individuals or families, in addition to the usual businesses and non-profit organizations. Usually, these messages honor birthdays or wedding anniversaries. Additionally, for more than 25 years, WLRH has offered a unique community service to its listening area. The WLRH PSA (public service announcement) Program provides representatives from local non-profit and community organizations the opportunity to record 30-second spots for their group or events for free. WLRH features PSAs on its three channels in all dayparts, including morning and afternoon drive time. The PSAs are deeply integrated into all parts of on-air programming. For many of the non-profits that use it, PSA Program may be the only way to connect with the communities they serve. WLRH offers two categories of PSAs: general PSAs share a group's service message for up to a year, while event PSAs provide information about a group's events and fundraisers.

George Dickerson, a former South Bend, Indiana television news anchor (but actually born in Huntsville), served as the only general manager in WLRH's entire history from its 1976 inception until his retirement in early 2007. It is believed that Dickerson's tenure was the longest ever for a manager of an American public radio station (and perhaps all public broadcasting), exceeding 30 years. After a short tenure by Dickerson's successor, a new general manager, Brett Tannehill, formerly of the University of Alabama's Alabama Public Radio network, came to WLRH in 2011. After Tannehill's retirement in December 2024, Erich Brukner was hired as General Manager and Division Director of Radio at Alabama Public Television. Brukner came from a 24 year career in commercial radio. Within months of his hiring, Brukner led WLRH's transition away from National Public Radio programming, towards more locally produced content and an Adult Album Alternative music format.
