= VUA (disambiguation) =

VUA refers to Valorous Unit Award, a military honor.

VUA may also refer to:

- Vrije Universiteit Amsterdam
- WVUA-FM, an Alabama college radio station
- VUA, a band formed by Faith No More singer Chuck Mosley
