= WUOA =

WUOA may refer to:

- WUOA-LD, a low-power television station (channel 28, virtual 46) licensed to serve Birmingham, Alabama, United States
- WVUA (TV), a television station (channel 6, virtual 23) licensed to serve Tuscaloosa, Alabama, which held the call sign WUOA from 2005 to 2015
