= HMLTD =

British band

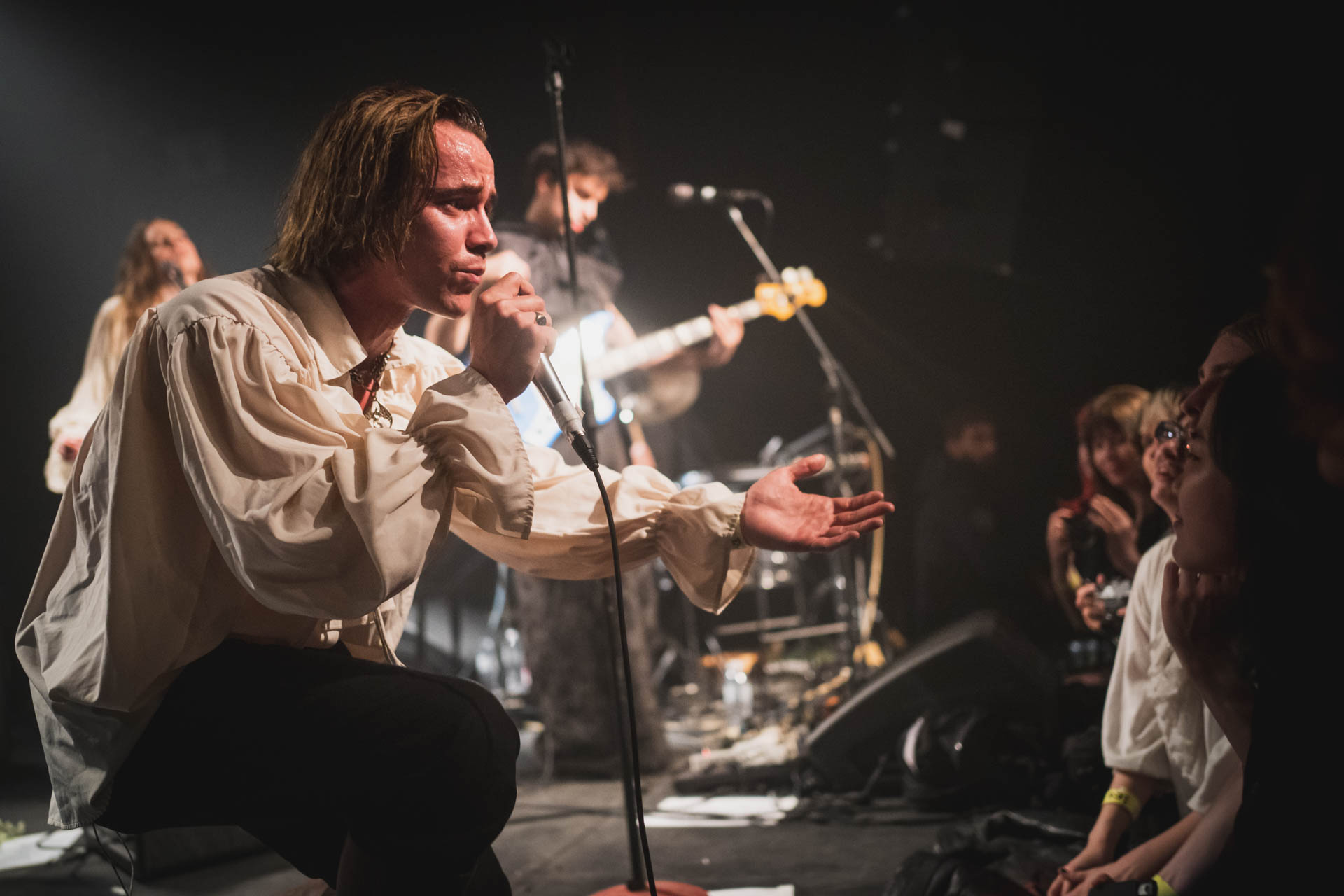
- HMLTD, live at the Institute of Contemporary Arts in 2023

Background information
- Origin: London, England
- Genres: Post-punk; art rock; experimental rock; glam rock
- Years active: 2015–present
- Labels: Ltd Ltd; Ouroboros; RCA; Sony; Lucky Number
- Members: Henry Spychalski; Duc Peterman; Theo Spark; Andrei Martynchyk
- Past members: Zacharie Cazes; James Donovan; Nicolas Mohnblatt; Achilleas Sarantaris; Seth Evans
- Website: hmltd.org

HMLTD are a British art punk band from London, formed in 2015. The band currently consists of lead vocalist Henry Spychalski, guitarist Duc Peterman, bassist Nico Mohnblatt, drummer Achilleas Sarantaris and keyboardist Seth Evans. On 7 February 2020, they released their debut album, West of Eden. On 7 April 2023, they released their second album, The Worm.

== History ==
HMLTD was formed in London as Happy Meal Ltd. in early 2015. Singer Henry Spychalski was born and raised in Torquay before moving to London. Spychalski met Duc, who had played in a band with Nico in Paris, at a bar in London, which helped foster a friendship and the formation of the band. James originates from Ipswich and shared a house in Elephant and Castle with friends, including Henry. Zac, from Bristol, met Duc through Reddit and "less vile corners" of 4chan, and Vincent from Hong Kong; when he returned home in late 2015, he was replaced by Achilleas, originally from Athens. Late in 2019, Zac left the band to focus on his education. He was replaced by Seth Evans, former keyboardist for band Black Midi and a friend of the band who they met in London.

On 20 July 2018, HMLTD released their debut EP, Hate Music Last Time Delete.

On 7 February 2020, HMLTD released their debut studio album West of Eden.

On 7 April 2023, HMLTD released their second album, The Worm.

== Musical style and imagery ==
Critics have categorized HMLTD's music as post-punk, art rock, experimental rock and glam rock.

Their image and sound can be seen as influenced by the Ziggy Stardust era of David Bowie and the New Romantic period in the 1980s. Their sound has been compared to various acts, such as The Prodigy and Peaches. They have also been regarded as avant-garde for their infusion of EDM and experimental pop with their guitar-oriented sound.

HMLTD has been criticised for using queer and/or gender-bender aesthetics, including cross-dressing, make-up, and flamboyant performances, despite being heterosexual men. According to Spychalski, the band is "trying to challenge toxic masculinity, and we’re doing that from the perspective we can do that from, as the human beings we were born into being, which is predominantly straight cis men. But I don’t think having that role should exclude or prohibit you from taking on that political perspective and from taking on what is probably the most violent, toxic, cruel force in our society. We learn from queer methods and always try to express that indebtedness."

== Members ==
Current members

- Henry Spychalski – vocals (2015–present)
- Duc Peterman – guitar (2015–present)
- Theo Spark – guitar, keyboards, additional vocals (2024-present)
- Andrei Martynchyk – drums, keyboards (2024–present)

Former members

- Zacharie Cazes – keyboards (2015–2019)
- James Donovan – guitar (2015–2022)
- Nicolas Mohnblatt – bass, keyboards (2015–2024)
- Achilleas Sarantaris – drums (2015–2024)
- Seth Evans – keyboards (2021–2024)

== Discography ==
=== Studio albums ===
- West of Eden (2020)
- The Worm (2023)
- Fangs (2026)

=== EPs ===
- Hate Music Last Time Delete (2018)
- Don't Leave Me (2021)

=== Singles ===
- "Stained" / "Is This What You Wanted?" (2016)
- "To the Door" / "Music!" (2017)
- "Satan, Luella & I" / "Kinkakuji" (2017)
- "Death Drive" (2018)
- "Flex" (feat. Xvoto.Delete) (2018)
- "LOADED" (2019)
- "The West Is Dead" (2019)
- "Why?" (2019)
- "Blank Slate" (2020)
- "Wyrmlands" (2023)
- "The End Is Now" (2023)
- "The Worm" (2023)
- "Days" (2023)
- "Blitzkrieg" (2026)
- "I Used to Ride in Limousines" (2026)
- "Umami" (2026)
