= Alabama Public Radio =

Public radio network in Alabama, United States

WUAL-FM
- Tuscaloosa, Alabama; United States
- Branding: Alabama Public Radio

Programming
- Format: Public radio
- Affiliations: APM, NPR, PRX

Ownership
- Owner: University of Alabama

Technical information
- Repeaters: WUAL-FM 91.5 (Tuscaloosa); WQPR 88.7 (Muscle Shoals); WAPR 88.3 (Selma); WHIL 91.3 (Mobile)

Links
- Website: apr.org

Alabama Public Radio (APR) is a network of public radio stations based in Tuscaloosa, Alabama, United States, that serves roughly the western half of the state of Alabama with classical music, folk music, and nostalgic music programs, as well as news and feature programs from the National Public Radio (NPR), Public Radio International (PRI), and American Public Media (APM) networks. The network is owned and operated by the University of Alabama, with studios on the fourth floor of the Digital Media Center inside the North End Zone of Saban Field at Bryant–Denny Stadium on the campus of the University of Alabama on Paul W. Bryant Drive in Tuscaloosa.

Since the station is licensed to a university with a broadcasting curriculum, students in the UA College of Communication and Information Sciences get opportunities for practical training in announcing and other varied production duties. Nonetheless, APR maintains a small professional staff, as well as several volunteer announcers from the larger community. The Alabama Public Radio newsroom has recently won over 182 awards for journalism excellence, one-third of which are at the national and international levels. This includes RTDNA's national Edward R. Murrow award for Overall Excellence. The APR news team also works extensively with journalism students at the University of Alabama. Newsroom student interns typically put in 750 hours of work, which results in 142 minutes of Alabama-centric news, heard by many Alabama residents. This provides students with valuable real-life experience and material for their resumes to seek employment, mainly in commercial media.

== History ==
The University of Alabama established WUAL-FM in January 1982 as the state's fifth public radio station. It emphasized service to the immediate western Alabama area in its first several years, since most of the region had no other access to NPR programming. However, UA soon realized the potential for expansion into other parts of the state without NPR service. Since Birmingham, Huntsville, southeastern Alabama, and Mobile already had existing stations, WUAL and UA officials focused on developing relay transmitters to send WUAL's signal into northwestern and south-central Alabama. Thus, WQPR, originally a joint project with the University of North Alabama in Florence, appeared in the late 1980s. It was followed in the early 1990s by WAPR, which is a joint venture of Alabama State University, Troy University (both of which already owned NPR stations of their own in the Montgomery area) and UA.

In September 2007, WQPR received a grant from the Corporation for Public Broadcasting to assist in its conversion from analog to digital broadcasting.

In 2011, due to the desire of licensee Spring Hill College to exit public broadcasting, Spring Hill's NPR member station, WHIL-FM in Mobile, joined APR, effective July 1. That station had been affected, like many throughout the country, by declining listener contributions, which influenced the college to sell the 32-year-old outlet.

APR's studios have been housed in various locations on campus. They were first located on Bryce Lawn Drive and moved to Phifer Hall around 1990. In February 2014 they moved to the university's Digital Media Center, a facility located inside Bryant–Denny Stadium that houses commercial TV station WVUA-CD; the Center for Public Television and Radio (APR's parent organization that produces some regular programs for Alabama Public Television); and Crimson Tide Productions, which is devoted to producing shows featuring UA athletics for commercial broadcast.

== APR stations ==
Four stations currently comprise the network:

Call sign	Frequency	City of license	FID	ERP (W)	HAAT	Class	Transmitter coordinates	FCC info	Notes
WHIL	91.3 FM	Mobile, Alabama	61999	100,000	325 m (1,066 ft)	C	30°41′20″N 87°49′49″W	LMS	Serves southern Alabama and the Gulf Coast
WQPR	88.7 FM	Muscle Shoals, Alabama	65441	20,000	130.8 m (429 ft)	C2	34°34′41.3″N 87°47′2.1″W	LMS	Serves northwestern Alabama to Decatur
WAPR	88.3 FM	Selma, Alabama	6125	53,000	427 m (1,401 ft)	C	32°8′30.5″N 86°44′42.9″W	LMS	Serves the Black Belt and Montgomery
WUAL-FM (Note: Flagship station.)	91.5 FM	Tuscaloosa, Alabama	69168	100,000	158 m (518 ft)	C1	33°5′40″N 87°24′47″W	LMS	Serves Birmingham to the Mississippi state line

WLJS-FM (91.9 FM), the student-operated station of Jacksonville State University which broadcasts to eastern central Alabama, simulcasts the first hour of classical music on APR each weekday. No other affiliations, either in personnel or in programming, exist between the two entities.

=== Translators ===
In addition to the full-power stations, Alabama Public Radio relays its signal via a low-powered translator to widen its broadcast area. The translator station was transferred to Edgewater Broadcasting, Inc under the authority of Summit Media and is a translator of WENN-AM 1320, with an effective radiated power of 35 W at a height above ground level of 846 feet. Also, the WQPR signal has a translator (W264AI) that covers the Huntsville-Decatur market on 100.7 FM. The area also has two other public stations, WLRH and WJAB.

Call sign	Frequency	City of license	FID	ERP (W)	HAAT	Class	Transmitter coordinates	FCC info	Notes
W261BX	100.1 FM	Birmingham, Alabama	150818	35	341.64 m (1,121 ft)	D	33°29′2.4″N 86°48′21.0″W	LMS	Relays WENN
W264AI	100.7 FM	Maysville, Alabama	76191	10	302.68 m (993 ft)	D	34°44′15.3″N 86°32′1.9″W	LMS	WQPR

== Weekday hosts ==
- Lacey Alexander and Pat Duggins--Morning Edition
- David Duff and Bob Woodman—daytime classical music

== Local specialty programs ==
Unlike many NPR-affiliated stations in recent times, APR has always featured a heavy schedule of locally hosted programs, many of which are unique in featuring special genres of music. Among them are the following:

- All Things Acoustic—a play on the title of NPR's flagship news broadcast, this show explores the wide variety of traditional and contemporary folk music and ethnic sounds, plus the singer-songwriter genre as well. UA professor Jeremy Butler hosts the program, heard on Friday evenings. This program debuted in 1993.
- Jugs, Jukes and Jazz—long-running program featuring jazz, ragtime, Dixieland, and big band sounds from the earliest recordings through about the 1960s or so. Tom Halladay helmed this show from the beginnings of APR (WUAL's) history until 2019. The program was heard for many years on Saturday afternoons and shifted to Sunday evenings until Halladay retired from radio. The cancellation marked the first time in the network's 37-year history that no "straight-ahead" jazz was broadcast at all, the program having been replaced by a syndicated smooth jazz offering.
- Bama Bluegrass—Jeff Miller is the current host of this similarly enduring show, which features artists from the Bluegrass and "old-time" country music scenes. The program, heard early Saturday evenings, is especially popular with older, rural listeners. Miller also hosts the Flashpoint Bluegrass Radio Show on the website worldwidebluegrass.com.
- The Crooners—Sunday-evening show featuring vocalists performing big band and swing music from the 1930s through the 1960s along with newer vocalists performing that music. Former APR staff announcer Dale Owen continues his involvement with the network as host of this program.
- Getting Sentimental Over You—similar to the above program, but emphasizing instrumentals rather than vocals plus even playing tunes from the 1910s and 1920s. The program immediately precedes "The Crooners" and is hosted by Dave Clark.

== See also ==
- WVUA-FM 90.7, the university's student-programmed station
