= Man/Woman/Chainsaw =

English rock band

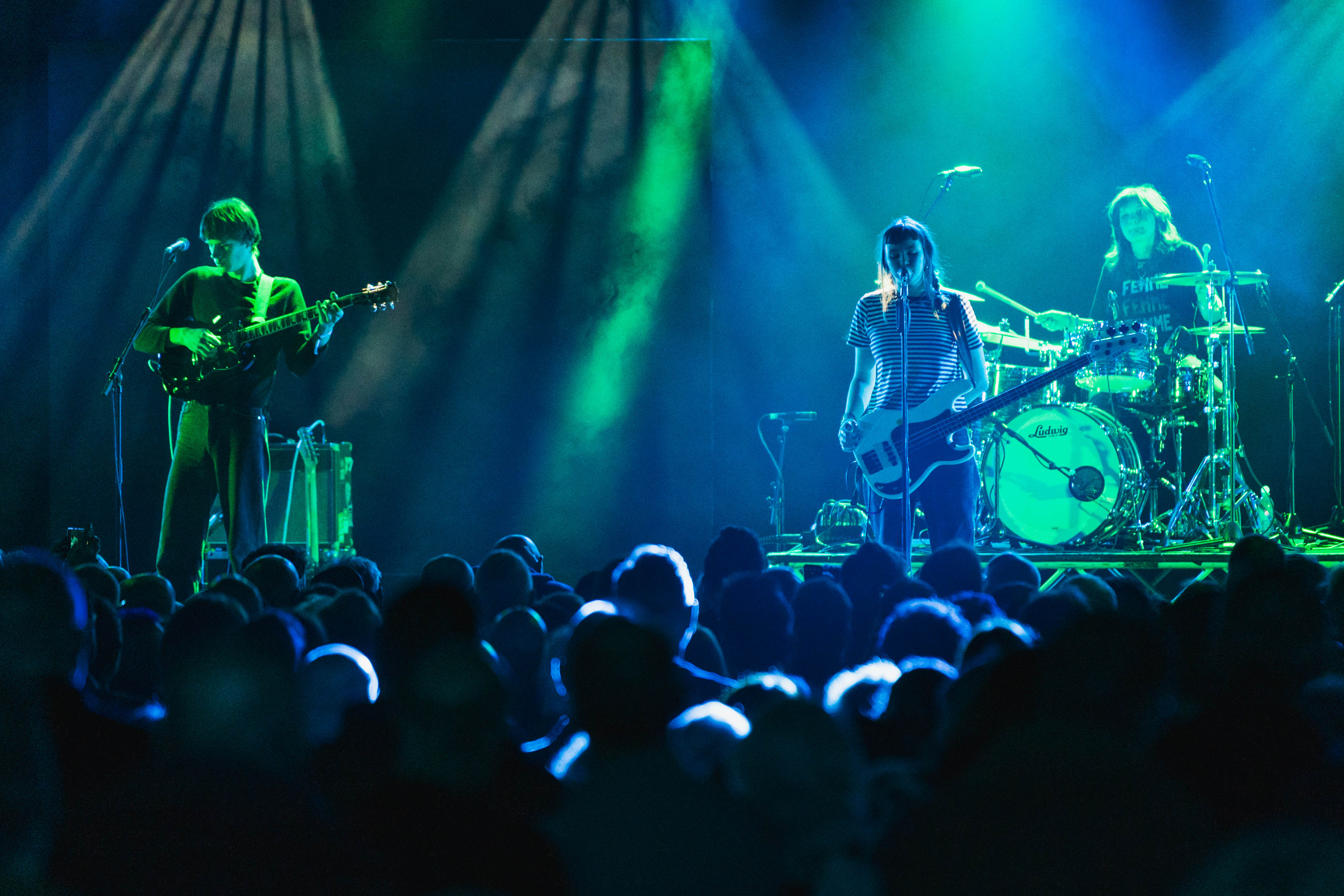
- Man/Woman/Chainsaw performing in 2025

Background information
- Origin: London, England
- Genres: Art rock; post-punk; indie rock
- Years active: 2019–present
- Labels: Big Richard Records; Fat Possum; Fiction
- Members: Billy Ward; Emmie-Mae Avery; Vera Leppänen; Clio Starwood; Lola Cherry; Billy Doyle
- Website: manwomanchainsaw.com

Man/Woman/Chainsaw is an English rock band from London, founded in 2019. The band are currently signed to Fiction Records.

== History ==
Billy Ward and Vera Leppänen began making music together aged 14 while at school together. The pair played with a range of other bandmates before solidifying the lineup of Man/Woman/Chainsaw in 2023. All members apart from Clio Starwood went to school together.

The band released their debut single, "Any Given Sunday" in September 2022 on Big Richard Records.

In October 2023, the band released the single "What Lucy Found There".

In July 2024, the band released the single "Ode to Clio" and announced that they would release their debut EP Eazy Peazy via Fat Possum Records. The EP was released in November 2024, produced by Daniel Fox of Gilla Band.

In early 2025, the band were named as one of NME's 100 Essential Emerging Artists.

In May 2025, the band released the single "Adam & Steve", a double A-side with "Only Girl", released in November via So Young Records. Both tracks were recorded with Seth Evans and Margo Broom at RAK Studios.

Shortly after the release of "Only Girl", the band signed to Fiction Records.

Following the release of four more singles, "Get Up and Dance", "Nosedive", "Goddamn, Lizard Man!", and "Something Else to Give", the band released their debut album Cannonball on 7 August 2026, which was also recorded with Seth Evans and Margo Broom. The album received immediate critical acclaim, with NME describing it as "one of the most accomplished debuts of the year".

== Members ==
- Vera Leppänen – lead vocals, bass
- Billy Ward – lead vocals, guitar
- Emmie-Mae Avery – lead vocals, keyboards, piano
- Billy Doyle – guitar, bass
- Clio Starwood – violin
- Lola Cherry – drums

== Discography ==
=== Studio albums ===
- Cannonball (7 August 2026)

=== EPs ===
- Eazy Peazy (8 November 2024)
