= Toshio Saeki (artist) =

Japanese illustrator and painter (1945–2019)

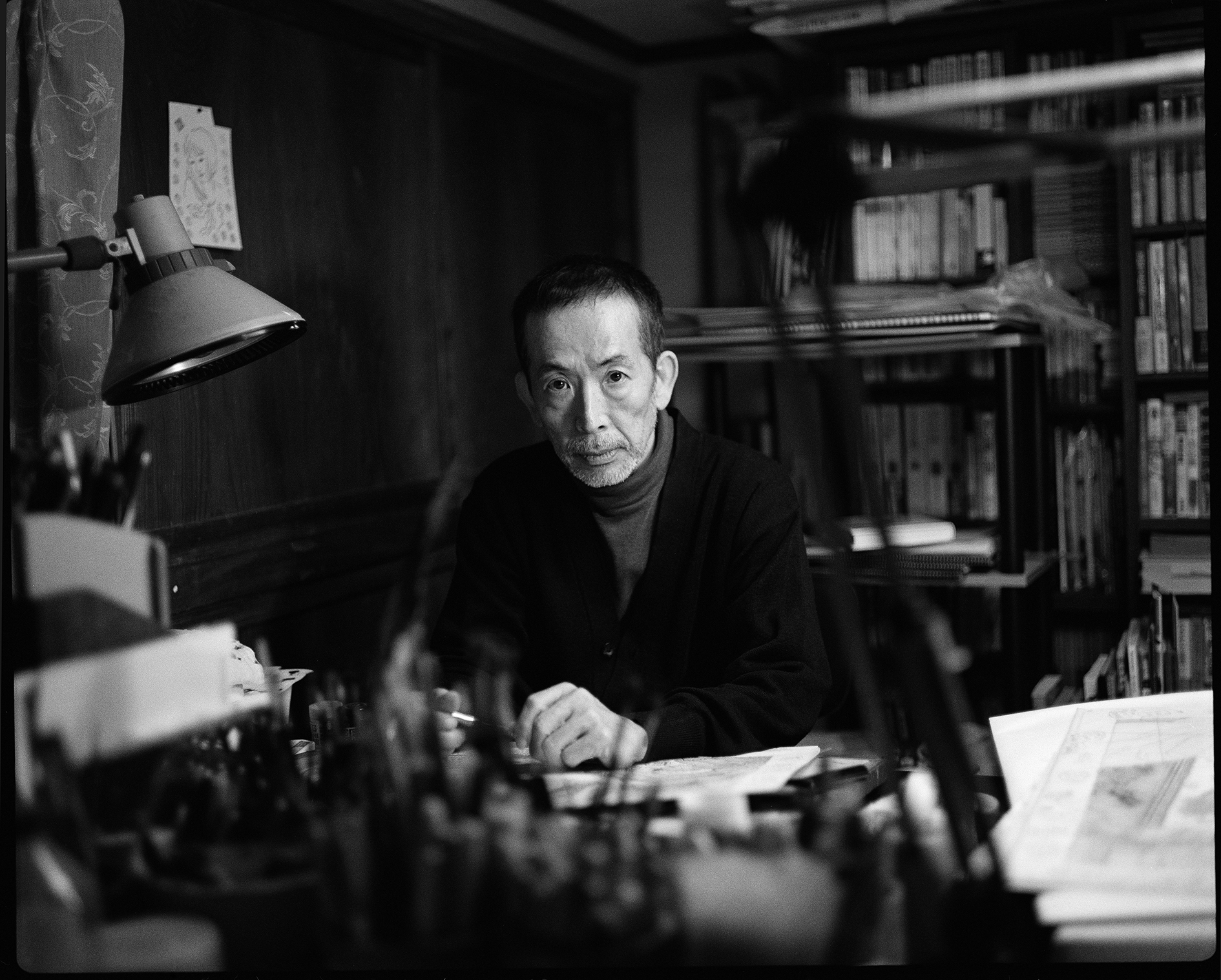
- Born: 1945
- Died: November 21, 2019
- Occupations: Illustrator, drawer
- Website: www.toshiosaeki.estate

Toshio Saeki (Japanese: 佐伯俊男, Hepburn: Saeki Toshio; 1945 – November 21, 2019) was a Japanese illustrator and painter, known for his erotic works.

== Life ==
Saeki was born in Miyazaki Prefecture and grew up in Osaka from the age of four. Little is known about his family background and the rest of his private life. Saeki deliberately avoided the public eye because, in his opinion, this allowed him to be freer and more provocative in his art.

Saeki was introduced to art as a teenager, when painting pictures of erotic scenes for the benefit of his high school friends. Having no sexual experience, this forced him to use his imagination for the creation of comical and violent scenes.

He studied Western oil painting and plaster work in Kyōto, at the Western Painting Department of Kyoto Municipal Hiyoshigaoka High School Art Program, from 1960, while also studying graphism and then worked as an advertising designer in Osaka from 1963 to 1966. Saeki then moved to Tokyo, in the hopes of becoming an illustrator for a publishing company. In the next two years, he publishes two books of drawings: Saeki Toshio gashū (佐伯俊男画集) in 1970 and Saeki Toshio sakuhin-shū (佐伯俊男作品集) in 1971. In his first drawings, he uses traditional japanese patterns to create a nightmarish frescoe, which provokes admiration from the public. He starts to be consecrated through exhibitions, including one at Gare Saint Lazare in Paris in 1970, where the originals of his drawings are stolen.

The publisher Haga shoten, known for publishing works of other influential artists like Nagisa Oshima or Shuji Teramaya, gives him free rein for his third book. Saeki works at it under harsh conditions: his wife, whom he has just met, is followed everywhere by a determined stalker. The couple, feeling the looming threat (the man will eventually take his own life after attempting to murder Saeki's wife), hides in tsurekomi yado (litt. Hotel for accompanied clients). It is there, and in two months, that Saeki finishes the drawings of Red Box (緋匡, Akai Hako), his most famous book.

Saeki traveled to Europe, the Soviet Union and the Middle East, among other places. The 1970s saw an increasingly open approach to sexuality in Japan. However, Toshio Saeki was not active in the sex club scene, despite his genre. He also had no models, but usually painted from his head. He said in an interview:

I don't think I could draw these scenes, if I was really into it myself […] I have to be distanced from it to be able to draw it in this way.

In the late 1980s, Saeki moved away from the Tokyo metropolis and from then on lived and worked in his studio in the rural Chiba Prefecture. In 1991, he published his first children book, Tricks for Kids, Fuyuinkan Shoten, the first of a series of three.

Saeki left Japan only once throughout his life. He died on November 21, 2019, but his death was not announced by his family until January 2020.

== Work ==
Toshio Saeki was interested in Western art. An important inspiration for him was the Frenchman Tomi Ungerer. Saeki's works often depict sexuality and brutality in a very explicit way, combining traditional Shunga and Yōkai styles with elements of Western art. He is regarded as one of the most important figues of the modern Ero Guro art movement.

The publication of his books, as well as the exhibitions he took part in, drew growing public interest to him. The cover of John Lennon and Yoko Ono's 1972 album Some Time in New York City features a drawing by Saeki of a devil-like figure attacking a young woman in school uniform with a knife, coming from the book Red Box. 1979 saw the release of the short film Demain la petite fille sera en retard à l'école by Michel Boschet, which was based on Saeki's drawings and won the César for Best Animated Short Film the following year. Toshio Saeki has had exhibitions in San Francisco, Tel Aviv, Toronto, and Taipei, among others, as well as at Art Basel Hong Kong

In 1990, he published the book Japon Intime with the french publishing house Albin Michel, thanks to Romain Slocombe. However, it was only twenty years later that he acquired a reputation in France. In 2010, the Da-End Gallery organized his second solo show in France, entitled Kuro Hozuki. More events followed: the edition of the Kuro Hozuki box set (2010), the publishing of the Scarlet Dreams anthology (2016), the re-publishing of Red Box (2019), or the use of his drawings by the clothing brand Supreme.

Since 2019, numerous retrospective exhibitions on Saeki's work were organized, among which Hana Yasha (2020) and Naishokagami (2022) at Da-End Gallery, presenting never-seen-before silkscreen prints. An image of Saeki's was used as the cover of Geordie Greep's 2024 album The New Sound.

== Style ==
Saeki is the inventor of a unique style, in a field he has entirely transformed: ero guro. This literary and artistic japanese movement started around 1930 and combined eroticism with macabre and grotesque elements. The movement was created by Edogawa Ranpo, and Saeki managed to use traditional patterns to highlight the fears and anxieties of his own generation, who felt the hopes and disappointments of the 1970s. In his style, one can point out the bright and vivid colors, as well as the gradations and the thin, simple lines. This is characteristic of chinto printing, and one of the ways Saeki distinguished himself from his contemporaries.

Between humor, horror and eroticism, Saeki, always confronted with censorship (which also fueled his creativity), created works mixing tradition, violence and sexual connotations. This is why the spectator often feels provoked when looking at his works. In 2016, the French and German television channel Arte visits himself in his studio, which allows Saeki to confide himself : «I want to wake up the sensibilities that are kept quiet and sleeping inside a person».

== Selected exhibitions ==
- 1970: Toshio Saeki Book Release Solo Exhibit, Paris, France
- 1971: Akaihako, Gallery Décor, Tokyo
- 1985: Toshio Saeki Solo Exhibit, Gray Box Gallery, San José, USA
- 1999: Yumemanji, Span Art Gallery, Tokyo
- 2006: Saeki Toshio 70, Kyōto and Tokyo
- 2009: ONIKAGE, Span Art Gallery, Tokyo
- 2010: Toshio Saeki Early Works, 111minnagallery, San Francisco, USA
- 2014: TOSHIO SAEKI, AISHONANZUKA, Hong Kong
- 2016: Toshio Saeki Print Exhibition, Kartel, Tel Aviv, Israel
- 2016: SELECTED WORKS 1972–2016, Narwhal, Toronto, Canada
- 2018 : Toshio Saeki – Unnen, Nanzuka Gallery, Tokyo
- 2018 : Musubi, Galerie Da-End, Paris
- 2018 : Unnen, NANKUZA, Japon
- 2019: Banshou Kaiki – Toshio Saeki Works Exhibition, Jiu Xiang Ju Gallery, Taipei, Taiwan
- 2019 : Red Box, Galerie Arts Factory, Paris
- 2019 : Banshou Kaiki, iu Xiang Ju Gallery, Taipei
- 2020 : Tokyo Pop Underground, Deitch, Los Angeles
- 2020 : Global Pop Underground, Parco Museum, Tokyo
- 2021 : Hana Yasha, Galerie Da-End, Paris
- 2021 : Tao of Dream, Jiu Xiang Ju Gallery, Taipei
- 2022 : Fièvres nocturnes, Galerie Arts Factory, Paris
- 2024 : Naishokagami, Galerie Da-End, Paris

== Published works ==
- 1970 : Gashū, Agremensha
- 1971 : Toshio sakuhinshū, Gakugei shorin
- 1972 : Akai hako, Haga shoten
- 1990 : Japon Intime, Albin Michel, Paris (ISBN 978-2-226-04881-3)
- 1992 : Yōga-kan, Kōchi shuppansha
- 1999 : Yume manji, Jiyū kokuminsha
- 2001 : Inkenka, Kawade shobōshinsha
- 2002 : The Earliest Works of Toshio Saeki, Jiyū kokuminsha
- 2003 : Gokurakuchō, Sawarabi hon kōbō
- 2004 : Jōnen emaki, Seirinkōgeisha
- 2006 : Showa Naughty Fun Picture Book
- 2006 : Les premiers dessins de Toshio Saeki, Tête Rock Underground, Paris (ISBN 978-2-911215-14-8)
- 2007 : Akai hako, Wailea publishing
- 2009 : Saeki Toshio's Works in Music, Presspop
- 2009 : Onikage (‘Demon Shadow’) : The Art of Toshio Saeki, Last Gasp
- 2010 : Yumegakure, Utsuki Shōkai
- 2014 : Yumenozki, Kokusho Kankokai
- 2016 : Rêve écarlate, Cornélius, Paris (ISBN 978-2-36081-106-9)
- 2019 : Banshō kaiki, JXJ Gallery
- 2019 : Unnen, Innen
- 2019 : Red Box, Cornélius, Paris (ISBN 978-2-36081-160-1)
