= WVUA-CD =

Television station in Tuscaloosa, Alabama

WVUA-CD and WVUA

WVUA-CD: Tuscaloosa–Northport, Alabama; WVUA: Tuscaloosa, Alabama; United States
- Channels for WVUA-CD: Digital: 23 (UHF); Virtual: 7
- Channels for WVUA: Digital: 6 (VHF); Virtual: 23

Programming
- Affiliations: 7.1/23.1: Cozi TV; for others, see § Subchannels

Ownership
- Owner: University of Alabama; (The Board of Trustees of the University of Alabama)

History
- Founded: WVUA-CD: December 29, 1994; WVUA: November 10, 1998
- First air date: WVUA-CD: October 31, 1996; WVUA: June 6, 2002
- Former call signs: WVUA-CD: W49BO (1996–1997); WJRD-LP (1998–2002); WVUA-CA (2002–2015); WVUA: WLDM (2002–2005); WUOA (2005–2015)
- Former channel number: WVUA-CD: Analog: 49 (UHF, 1996–2000), 7 (VHF, 2000–2015); Translator: WJMY-CD 17 Tuscaloosa; WVUA: Analog: 23 (UHF, 2002–2009)
- Former affiliations: inTV (1996–1998); Pax TV (1998–2002); America One (2002–2008); This TV (2008–2020)
- Call sign meaning: Voice of the University of Alabama (in reference to university-owned radio station WVUA-FM)

Technical information
- Licensing authority: FCC
- Facility ID: WVUA-CD: 70429; WVUA: 77496
- Class: WVUA-CD: CD
- ERP: WVUA-CD: 15 kW; WVUA: 26 kW
- HAAT: WVUA-CD: 179.9 m (590 ft); WVUA: 395 m (1,296 ft)
- Transmitter coordinates: WVUA-CD: 33°9′29.7″N 87°30′56.8″W; WVUA: 33°29′2″N 86°48′21″W
- Translator: WDVZ-CD 3 Tuscaloosa

Links
- Public license information: WVUA-CD: Public file; LMS; WVUA: Public file; LMS
- Website: wvua23.com

WVUA-CD (channel 7) is a low-power, Class A television station licensed to both Tuscaloosa and Northport, Alabama, United States, affiliated with the classic television network Cozi TV. Owned by the University of Alabama, the station maintains studios and transmitter facilities within the Digital Media Center at Bryant–Denny Stadium on the university's campus in Tuscaloosa.

As WVUA-CD's broadcasting radius does not reach the entire Birmingham–Tuscaloosa–Anniston market, the station's programming is simulcast to the remainder of the area on full-power satellite WVUA (channel 23), which is also licensed to Tuscaloosa with its transmitter located atop Red Mountain, near the southern edge of Birmingham.

== Overview ==
Despite being owned by the University of Alabama System, the station is financially independent from the University of Alabama. WVUA is licensed and operates as a commercial television station, and as such, most of its funding is generated from advertising revenue; WVUA/WVUA-CD is one of only two commercial television stations in the United States that is owned by a public institution, alongside University of Missouri–owned NBC affiliate KOMU-TV in Columbia, Missouri. The station has a full-time paid professional staff including station and advertising sales executives, production and news department staff (including anchors, reporters and a news director), and relies heavily on University of Alabama students who act as on-air and production staff, and sales assistants.

=== History ===
The station's original construction permit, for operation on UHF channel 49, was issued by the Federal Communications Commission (FCC) in 1994 under the call letters W49BO; the permit was held by Krypton Broadcasting, who intended to operate the station as a repeater of Birmingham independent station WABM (channel 68). Channel 49 first signed on the air in 1998 as WJRD-LP, broadcasting on UHF channel 49. It originally operated out of studio facilities located on Jug Factory Road in Tuscaloosa, that formerly housed the operations of WDBB (channel 17) until the shutdown of its news department in December 1995. The station became a charter affiliate of Pax TV (now Ion Television) when the network launched on August 31 of that year; in August 1999, WJRD-LP became the secondary Pax TV outlet for the Birmingham–Tuscaloosa–Anniston market, when the network's parent company Paxson Communications (now Ion Media) converted its CBS affiliate in Gadsden, WNAL-TV (channel 44), into a Pax owned-and-operated station under the callsign WPXH-TV.

The University of Alabama acquired WJRD-LP in 2001, as part of a $1 million gift from the family of Alabama Crimson Tide football coach Paul "Bear" Bryant. Once the donation was finalized, the station moved its operations to the University of Alabama campus. In January 2002, its call letters were changed to WVUA-CA (named after the call letters of the university-owned radio station WVUA-FM (90.7)), after its license was upgraded to Class A status; the station subsequently became an affiliate of America One at that time.

In November 2004, Channel 23 LLC filed an application with the FCC to donate full-power station, WLDM (channel 23), to the university. Shortly after that donation was finalized in March 2005, the station's call letters were changed to WUOA (for the University of Alabama), taken from the original call letters of the university-owned Alabama Public Radio station WUAL-FM (91.5); the University of Alabama then converted WUOA into a full-power satellite station of WVUA-CA in order to extend its signal deeper into most of the Birmingham market. In 2006, satellite providers Dish Network and DirecTV both began carrying WVUA-CA as part of their respective lineups of Birmingham area broadcast television stations.

In November 2008, WVUA-CA became a part-time affiliate of This TV, while continuing to carry syndicated programming and local newscasts to fill certain time slots during which the station does not air the network's programs (this results in periodic scheduling issues due to the network's movie-dominant schedule, as some films run into time slots where WVUA-CD runs syndicated programs depending on their length or scheduled airtime). Since the station did not carry all of This TV's programming on its main channel nor on one of its subchannels, WVUA-CD was the largest part-time affiliate by market size that did not carry the network's full schedule.

On May 8, 2015, the call sign of the full-power satellite station was changed from WUOA to WVUA. On June 3, 2015, WVUA-CA was granted a license to operate a digital signal on UHF channel 23, and amended its call letters to WVUA-CD.

In October 2020, WVUA's primary affiliation was with Cozi TV. This TV was on the station's third subchannel until its closing.

== Programming ==
WVUA carries Cozi TV part-time on its main channel, running only the network's overnight films and classic television programs, and daytime and early prime time films, with a more limited schedule on Saturdays and Sundays due to its carriage of syndicated and university-related sports programs.

Through its ownership by the University of Alabama, the station also carries most team-related magazine programs focused on the Alabama Crimson Tide (which are mainly produced by the university's commercial television production unit, Crimson Tide Productions), including the team's football coach's show The Nick Saban Show and the sports talk shows Tide TV This Week and Tider Insider.

=== News operation ===
Unlike most low-power or Class A television stations, WVUA-CD produces its own local newscasts, consisting solely of early-evening newscasts on Monday through Friday nights and a late-evening 10 p.m. newscast seven nights a week. The station presently broadcasts 8 1/2 hours of locally produced newscasts each week (with 1 1/2 hours each weekday, and a half-hour each on Saturdays and Sundays).

The station's news department began operations at WVUA-CD's sign-on in 1998, providing local news coverage to west-central Alabama for the first time since WDBB and WCFT-TV (channel 33, now WSES) shifted focus to the Birmingham area during the mid-1990s (the latter being a byproduct of WBRC's conversion into a Fox owned-and-operated station, which resulted in WCFT taking over the market's ABC affiliation as part of the "ABC 33/40" trimulcast arrangement involving Birmingham-based W58CK (channel 58, now WBMA-LD) and Anniston-based WJSU-TV (channel 40, now WGWW) in September 1996).

Approximately 80% of the staff employed with the station is made up of University of Alabama students, working in either paid or unpaid positions, with its operations drawing on the resources of the Department of Journalism and Creative Media of the University of Alabama College of Communication and Information Sciences; the remainder consists of non-student staff hired by the university. Students are involved in all aspects of the newsgathering and production process, with much of its reporting and most behind-the-scenes staff consisting of students in the Department of Journalism and Creative Media.

From its inception in 2002 until 2014, the station's operations were originally housed in the basement area of Reese-Phifer Hall. On June 12, 2012, WVUA began broadcasting portions of its local newscasts, particularly weather segments, in high definition. In April 2014, WVUA/WUOA migrated its operations into the newly completed Digital Media Center at Bryant–Denny Stadium.

== Technical information ==
=== Subchannels ===
The stations' signals are multiplexed:

Subchannels of WVUA-CD and WVUA
| Subchannel | Res. | Short name | Programming |
|---|---|---|---|
| 3.1 / 7.1 / 23.1 | 1080i | WVUA | Cozi TV |
| 3.2 / 7.2 / 23.2 | 480i | Shop LC | Shop LC (4:3) |
| 7.3 / 23.3 | 480i | Movie | MovieSphere Gold (4:3) |
| 3.3 / 23.4 | 480i | RADAR | WVUA's FastTrack Live Radar (4:3) w/audio simulcast of Alabama Public Radio |

=== Analog-to-digital conversion ===
Because it was granted an original construction permit after the FCC finalized the DTV channel allotment plan on April 21, 1997, the then-WUOA did not receive a companion channel for a digital television station. Instead, on June 12, 2009, the end of the conversion period from analog to digital transmissions for full-power television stations in the United States, WUOA was required to turn off its analog signal and flash-cut its digital signal into operation. The university was granted a construction permit for WUOA to move to channel 6, using virtual channel 23.
