= If You Are But a Dream =

1942 song by Moe Jaffe, Jack Fulton and Nat Bonx

"If You Are But a Dream" is a popular song published in 1942 with words and music by Moe Jaffe, Jack Fulton and Nat Bonx. The melody is based on Anton Rubinstein's "Romance in E flat, Op. 44, No. 1," popularly known as "Rubinstein's Romance".

The song is most closely associated with Frank Sinatra, who recorded it first for Columbia Records on November 14, 1944, with an arrangement by Axel Stordahl. This recording was on the reverse side of a 78 rpm record with "White Christmas", and consequently did very well with "White Christmas" reaching the No. 7 spot in the Billboard charts. "If You Are But a Dream" itself briefly reached the Billboard charts in the No. 19 position. A year later, in 1945, "If You Are But a Dream" was included in the Academy Award-winning short film, The House I Live In, in which Sinatra was featured. Sinatra recorded this song again for Capitol Records on December 11, 1957, with an arrangement by Nelson Riddle. This recording was first released on This Is Sinatra Volume 2. "If You Are But a Dream" was featured most prominently in Woody Allen's 1987 film, Radio Days, which features the 1944 recording on the soundtrack.

== Other recordings ==
"If You Are But a Dream" was also recorded by a number of other artists.

These include (among others):

- Brook Benton - for his album Songs I Love to Sing (1960).
- Vic Damone - Why Can't I Walk Away (1968).
- The Delta Rhythm Boys - for the album Dry Bones (1952).
- Jimmy Dorsey and His Orchestra (vocal by Bob Eberly) - this briefly reached the Billboard charts in 1942 in the No. 20 position.
- Nelson Eddy - for his album A Starry Night (1960).
- Duke Ellington
- Robert Goulet - Always You (1962).
- Screamin' Jay Hawkins - At Home with Screamin' Jay Hawkins (1958).
- Carol Kidd - A Place in My Heart (1999).
- Geordie Greep - The New Sound (2024).
- Mario Lanza - If You Are But a Dream - Radio Performances Never Before Released (1965).
- Gerry Mulligan
- Harve Presnell - The World's Greatest Love Songs (1964).
- Ray Price
- Roy Hamilton - a single release in 1955.
