= Alabama A&M University =

Public university in Normal, Alabama, US

- Former names: Huntsville State Normal School for Negroes (1875–1885); State Normal and Industrial School of Huntsville (1885–1896); The State Agricultural and Mechanical College for Negroes (1896–1919); State Agricultural and Mechanical Institute for Negroes (1919–1948); Alabama Agricultural and Mechanical College (1948–1969)
- Motto: "Service is Sovereignty"
- Type: Public historically black land-grant university
- Established: 1875; 151 years ago
- Founder: William Hooper Councill
- Accreditation: SACS
- Academic affiliations: ACES; ORAU; Space-grant
- Endowment: $48.0 million (2019)
- President: Daniel K. Wims
- Students: 7,808
- Location: Normal, Alabama, United States; 34.7826°N 86.5687°W
- Campus: Midsize city, 880 acres (3.6 km^{2})
- Colors: Maroon; White
- Nickname: Bulldogs and Lady Bulldogs
- Sporting affiliations: NCAA Division I FCS – SWAC
- Mascot: Butch
- Website: www.aamu.edu
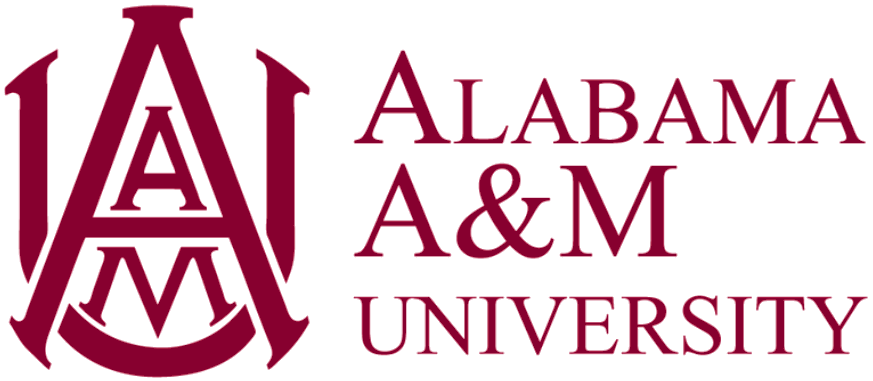

U.S. National Register of Historic Places
- Official name: Alabama A&M University Historic District
- Designated: December 31, 2001
- Reference no.: 01001407

Alabama Register of Landmarks and Heritage
- Official name: Alabama A&M University Historic District
- Designated: August 25, 1994

Alabama Agricultural and Mechanical University (Alabama A&M or AAMU) is a public historically black land-grant university in Normal, Alabama, United States, a part of Huntsville. Founded in 1875 as a state-run "normal school", it took its present name in 1969. AAMU is a member-school of the Thurgood Marshall College Fund and is accredited by the Southern Association of Colleges and Schools. The Alabama Agricultural and Mechanical University Historic District, also known as Normal Hill College Historic District, has 28 buildings and four structures listed in the United States National Register of Historic Places. Alabama A&M's athletic teams, known as the Bulldogs, compete in NCAA Division I as members of the Southwestern Athletic Conference (SWAC).

== History ==
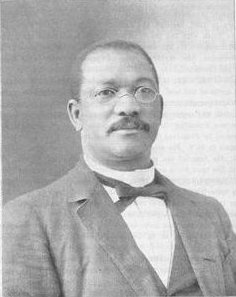
William Hooper Councill, first president of the university

Teacher and schoolmaster William Hooper Councill won approval for his plan for the Huntsville State Normal School for Negroes, established by an act of the Alabama State Legislature in 1875. The school opened on May 1, 1875, at a church on Eustis Street, with instruction for 61 teaching students overseen by Principal Councill, assisted by Rev. Alfred Hunt. It was one of about 180 "normal schools" founded by state governments in the 19th century to train teachers for the rapidly growing public common schools. It was one of 23 established to train African Americans to teach in segregated schools. Some closed but most steadily expanded their role and became state colleges in the early 20th century and state universities in the late 20th century. By 1878, the state appropriation increased from $1,000 to $2,000 and the school expanded its enrollment and curriculum.

In 1881, the faculty pooled money from their salaries to purchase two and a half acres (1.0 ha) on West Clinton Street. In 1885 the school, now with around 180 students, changed its name to State Normal and Industrial School of Huntsville, after the earlier addition of programs for sewing, printing, carpentry, mattress making and gardening. By 1890, the school site became known as Normal, Alabama, and a post office was established. In 1891, the school was designated as a land-grant college through legislative enactment under the terms of the Morrill Act of 1890. In 1896, its name was changed to The State Agricultural and Mechanical College for Negroes. In 1919, the school became the State Agricultural and Mechanical Institute for Negroes. In 1948 it was renamed the Alabama Agricultural and Mechanical College. AAMU became fully accredited by the Southern Association of Colleges and Schools in 1963. In June 1969, the school adopted its current name, Alabama Agricultural and Mechanical University.

The new millennium saw the construction of the West Campus Complex, the erection of the 21,000-seat Louis Crews Stadium, the renovations of buildings and the moving of athletic programs up to NCAA Division I and the Southwestern Athletic Conference (SWAC). The School of Engineering and Technology facility was built in 2002, and the Ph.D. program in Reading and Literacy was established. Andrew Hugine was approved by the board of trustees as the 11th president on June 18, 2009. In 2015, the board of trustees approved out-of-state scholarships for the fall 2016 semester. The scholarships are contingent on prospective students meeting various academic qualifications.

== Campus ==
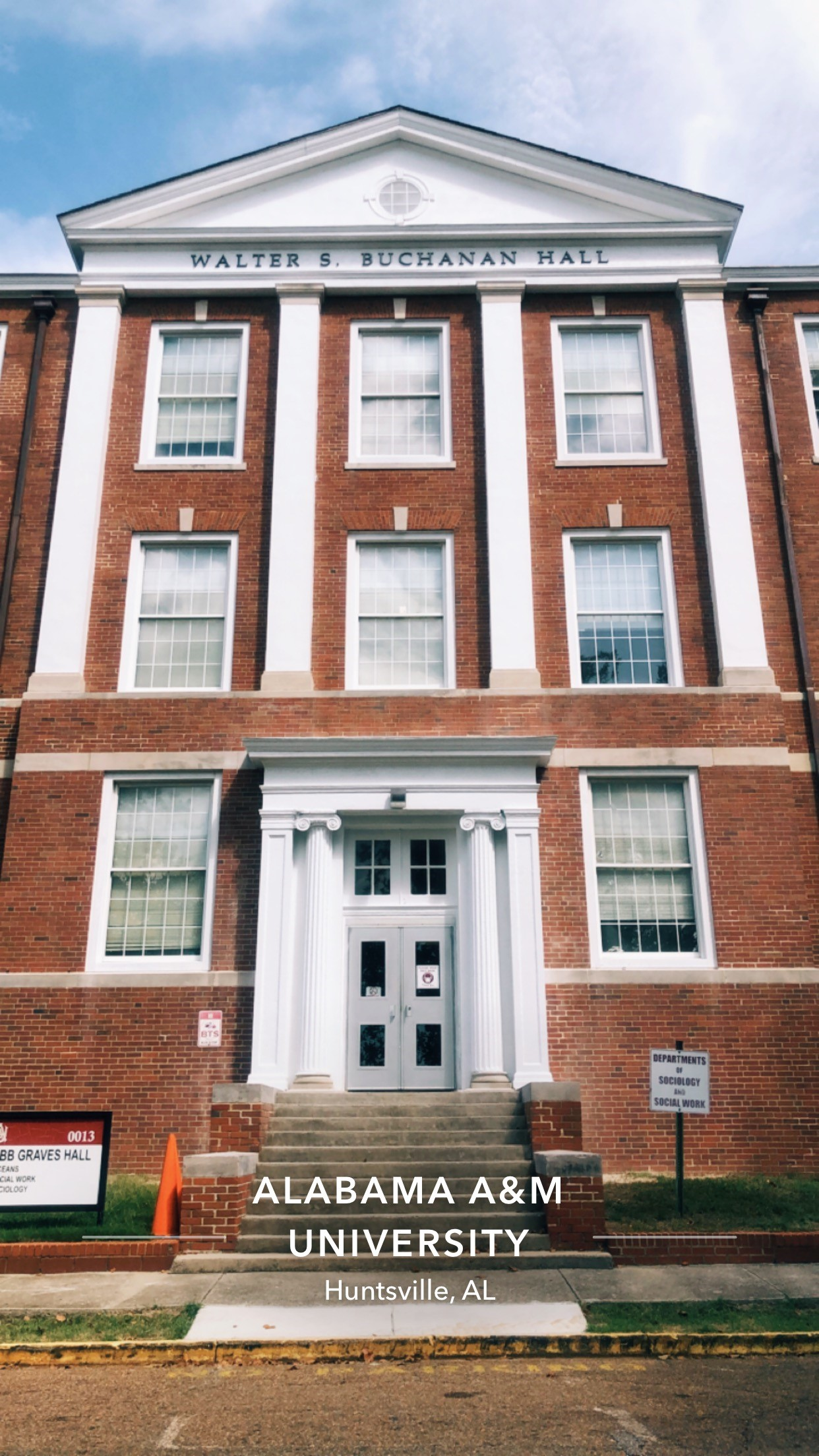
Bibb Graves Hall was renamed Buchanan Hall in 2020 to honor the university's second president.

The campus grounds were designed by the Olmsted Brothers firm. The J.F. Drake Memorial Learning Resources Center was renovated in 2002, adding almost 15,000 square feet (1,400 m^{2}), an interactive Distance Learning Auditorium, conference, study and class rooms, lounges, and computer lab. The State Black Archives Research Center and Museum is located in the James H. Wilson Building, a national registered historical structure. On the third floor, the University Archives contains a collection of AAMU-related papers, paperwork, letters, and photos.

Louis Crews Stadium is the sixth largest stadium in Alabama. Alabama A&M Events Center, which opened in 2022, is home to the basketball teams, commencements and other events sits adjacent to Louis Crews Stadium.

In 1994, the Mamie Foster Student Living/Learning Complex was erected. Groundbreaking was held for the School of Business facility in 1995 and Louis Crews Stadium and Ernest L. Knight Complex Residence Hall construction began. The Engineering and Technology building known as Bond Hall was completed in 2002 and opened for classes in January 2003. The Normal Historic Preservation Association was incorporated on April 15, 2009, to help preserve and protect the Alabama A&M University National Historic District. The campus is served by the Bulldog Transit Shuttle bus system. A new 600-bed residence hall was constructed and opened for students January 2018, and construction planning of a new Event Center was approved by the board of trustees in September 2019.

== Academics ==
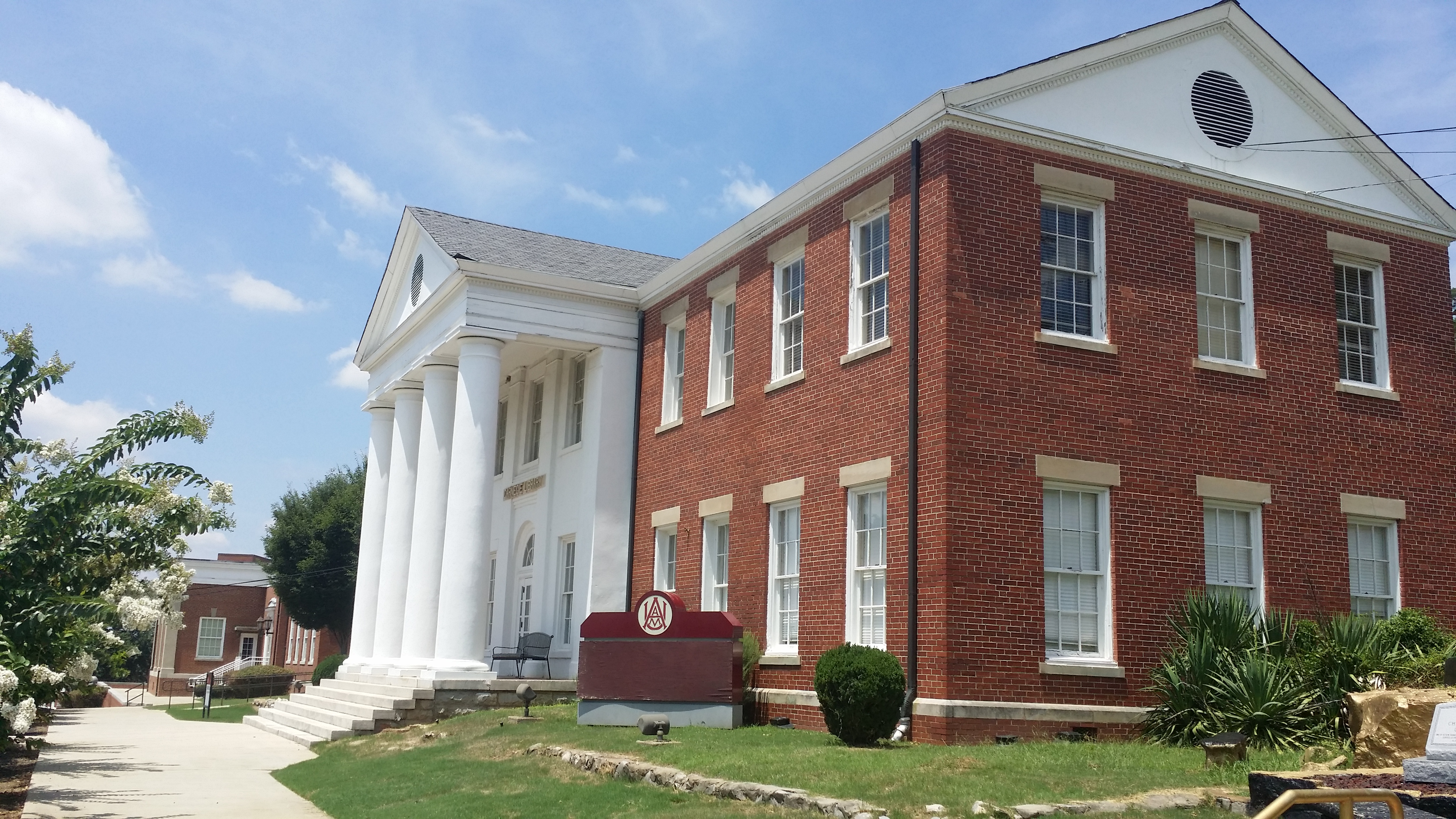
AAMU Carnegie Library

The university awards 41 Baccalaureate, 23 master's, one EdS, and five PhD degrees. A selective honors program is available for academically exceptional undergraduate students.

=== Colleges and schools ===
- College of Agricultural, Life and Natural Sciences
- College of Business and Public Affairs
- College of Education, Humanities, and Behavioral Sciences
- College of Engineering, Technology and Physical Sciences
- School of Graduate Studies

=== Faculty ===
- 19:1 student-faculty ratio
- Fewer than 20 students in 41 percent of courses
- 348 faculty members across all undergraduate, graduate and professional programs

=== Students ===
- From 44 states and 11 foreign countries
- 7,808 students
- 42 percent first-time college students
- Middle 50th percentile on ACT: 14–19
- 75 percent student participation in community service projects

=== National Space Science and Technology Center ===
The National Space Science and Technology Center (NSSTC) is a joint research venture between NASA, Alabama A&M and six other research universities of the state of Alabama, represented by the Space Science and Technology Alliance. The aim of the NSSTC is to foster collaboration in research between government, academia, and industry.

=== Alabama Cooperative Extension System ===
The Smith-Lever Act of 1914 established The Alabama Cooperative Extension System. The system provides educational outreach to the citizens of Alabama on behalf of the state's two land grant universities: Alabama A&M University and Auburn University. The system employs more than 800 faculty, professional educators, and staff members operating in offices in each of Alabama's 67 counties and in nine urban centers covering the major regions of the state. In conjunction with the Alabama Agricultural Experiment Station, the system also staffs six extension and research centers located in the state's principal geographic regions. Since 2004, "Alabama Extension" has functioned primarily as a regionally based system in which the bulk of educational programming is delivered by agents operating across a multi-county area and specializing in specific fields. County extension coordinators and county agents work with regional agents and other extension personnel to deliver services to clients within their areas.

=== Tuition and financial aid ===
In the 2017–2018 award year, 3,701 Alabama A&M University students received financial assistance from Pell Grants, totaling $18,323,395.

== Student life ==
Undergraduate demographics as of fall 2023
Race and ethnicity	Total
Black	90%
Hispanic	2%
International student	2%
Two or more races	2%
Unknown	2%
White	2%
Economic diversity
Low-income (Note: The percentage of students who received an income-based federal Pell grant intended for low-income students.)	65%
Affluent (Note: The percentage of students who are a part of the American middle class at the bare minimum.)	35%

=== Student activities ===
The Office of Student Activities and Leadership Development (OSALD) has oversight of and provides assistance to several student-led organizations:

- Programs and Activities Council
- Student Government Association
- National Pan-Hellenic Council
- Social Greek Council
- Student Publications

=== Marching Maroon & White ===
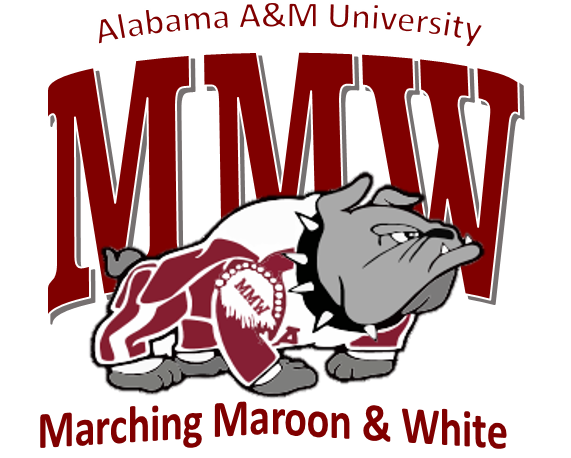
The Marching Maroon & White logo

The Marching Maroon & White is the official marching band of Alabama A&M University. It has over 280 members. The band has performed in the Rose Parade and made numerous appearances in the Honda Battle of the Bands. In 2023, the Marching Maroon & White made history, becoming the first HBCU band to lead the Macy's Thanksgiving Day Parade.

The Marching Maroon & White has two auxiliaries, the Dancin' Divas (danceline), and the Fabulous flags (color guard).

=== Alabama A&M University Choir ===
The Alabama A&M University Choir became the first choir from a historically black college and university to be invited to attend the American Choral Festival in Germany. On Thursday, January 21, 2010, the choir performed a concert at the Alabama Music Educators Association Annual Conference. This was a historical event because the choir was the first choir from a historically black college and university in the state to perform at that conference. In 2014, the choir was invited by the Distinguished Concerts International of New York to be presented in concert at the Lincoln Center in New York City.

=== Other student organizations ===
- AAMU Cheerleaders
- AAMU Gospel Choir
- AAMU Royal Court
- Sigma Tau Epsilon professional fraternity Rho chapter
- Phi Beta Lambda business fraternity, Xi Xi chapter
- Eta Kappa Tau Engineering and Technology fraternity – Alpha chapter
- Alpha Phi Omega service fraternity, Pi Epsilon chapter
- Nu Rho Sigma fine arts fraternity, Alpha Alpha chapter
- Sigma Alpha Iota music fraternity for women, Theta Zeta chapter
- Tau Beta Sigma honorary band sorority, Theta Iota chapter
- Voluptuous Bulldog Beauties (VBB)-Women's Plus Size Organization, and Dance Team
- AAMU Southern Belles
- The Collegiate 100 Black Men of America
- Student Government Association
- AAMU Democrats
- AAMU University Choir
- M.A.N.U.P "Men of America Nurturing and Ushering Progress"
- Marketing Club
- Math Club
- MBA Association
- Mu Epsilon Delta Pre-Health Fraternity, Lambda Chapter
- Poetry Club
- Ward Modeling Troop, Incorporated
- House Arrest Two Championship Dance Team Incorporated
- Trendsetters Fashion Club
- Alima Dance Company
- Student Health Alliance
- P.O.W.E.R. (Placing Opportunities Within Everyone's Reach) Mentor Program
- Forestry club/Fire Dawgs

== Athletics ==
Alabama A&M's sports teams participate in NCAA Division I (Football Championship Subdivision, formerly I-AA for football) in the Southwestern Athletic Conference (SWAC). Alabama A&M's colors are maroon and white and their mascot is the Bulldog. The Alabama A&M Department of Athletics sponsors men's intercollegiate basketball, football, baseball, golf, tennis and track & field along with women's intercollegiate tennis, basketball, soccer, track, cross country, bowling, volleyball and softball. Also offered are men's and women's swimming clubs. The football team's home games are played at Louis Crews Stadium. Both men's and women's basketball home games are played in Alabama A&M Events Center." Prior to joining the SWAC, Alabama A&M competed in the NCAA Division II Southern Intercollegiate Athletic Conference from 1941 to 1998. While in the SIAC, Alabama A&M won 11 conference championships in women's volleyball, seven conference championships in football, seven in cross-country, nine in men's basketball, two in women's basketball, and two in baseball.

Notable athletes include Pro Football Hall of Famer and 4-time Super Bowl Champion John Stallworth, NFL Pro Bowler and Super Bowl Champion Robert Mathis, two-time NFL Pro Bowler Howard Ballard, Olympic Gold Medalist Jearl Miles Clark, Andre Brick Haley, Desmond Cambridge, Obie Trotter, and Mickell Gladness. Cambridge currently holds the NCAA single season steals record. Trotter is 4th all-time single season steals, and Gladness is 2nd all-time in blocks in a season. Gladness set an NCAA Division I single game record with 16 blocks against Texas Southern on February 24, 2007. No other player in Division I history has even recorded 15 blocks in a single game.

=== Media ===
Alabama A&M University is the licensee for National Public Radio affiliate station WJAB 90.9, which operates 24 hours a day, seven days a week on campus. WJAB airs various public affairs programming, as well as live coverage of Bulldog athletic events.

== Police department ==
The Alabama A&M University Department of Public Safety (DPS) is AAMU's campus police.

== See also ==
- List of land-grant universities
- List of forestry universities and colleges
- List of agricultural universities and colleges
- List of engineering schools
- List of systems engineering universities
- List of business schools in the United States
- Magic City Classic
- WJAB 90.9 FM Radio
