= Seth Evans (musician) =

English keyboardist (born 1998)

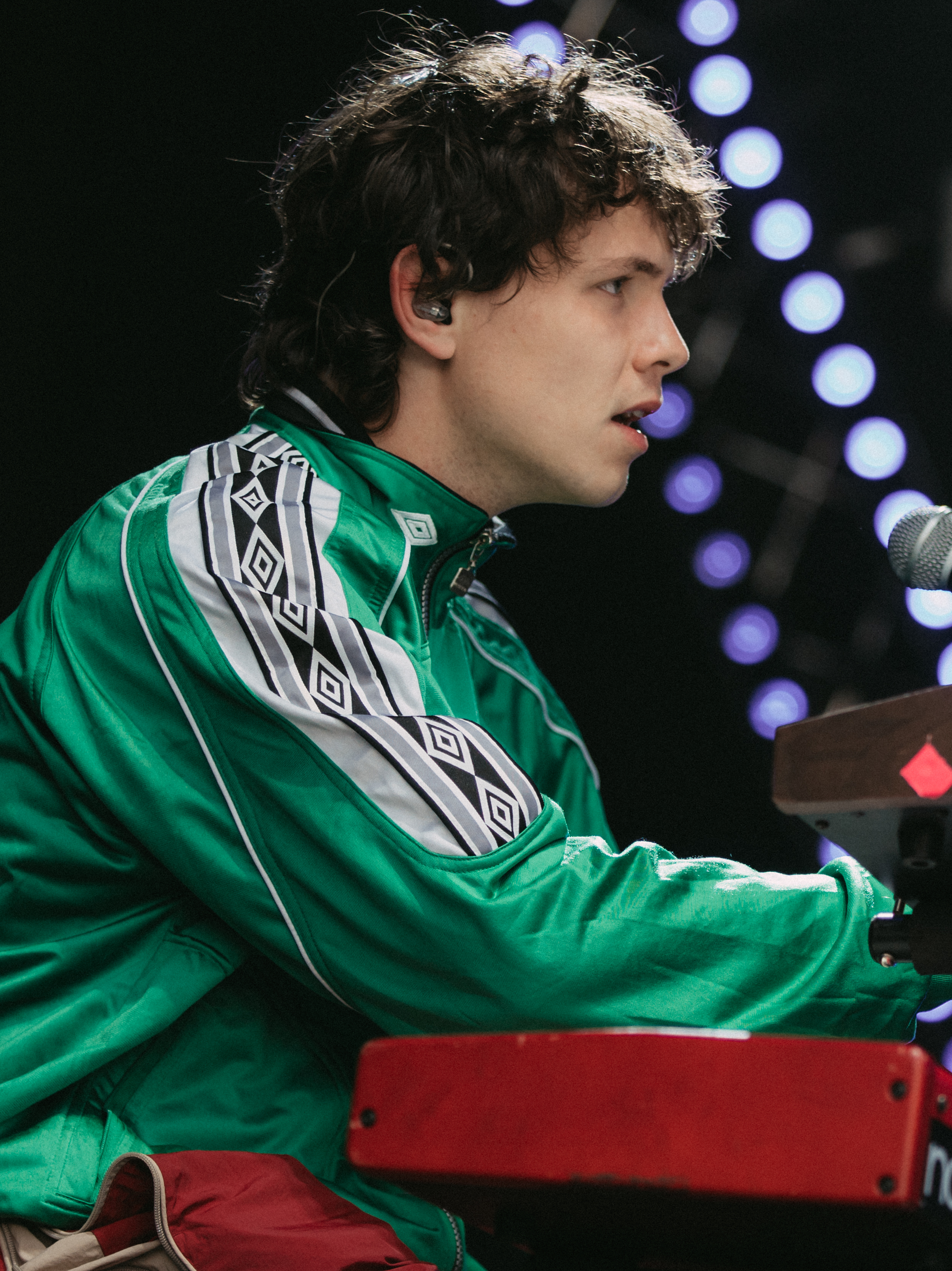
- Evans performing at the Positivus Festival in 2022

Background information
- Born: Seth Nigel George Evans; 20 February 1998 (age 28)
- Genres: Art punk; Experimental rock
- Occupations: Musician; record producer
- Instruments: Piano; keyboards; bass; oboe
- Years active: 2019–present
- Formerly of: Black Midi; HMLTD

Seth Nigel George Evans (born 20 February 1998), nicknamed Shank, is a British musician and keyboardist. He is known for his work as a former touring and session member of experimental rock band Black Midi and as a current member of art punk band HMLTD. Evans is also a regular collaborator of My New Band Believe, working with the project both in the studio and during live performances.

As a record producer, Evans produced Geordie Greep's debut solo album, The New Sound (2024), Man/Woman/Chainsaw's debut album, Cannonball (2026), and individual songs by My New Band Believe.

== Career ==
Evans was invited to play in Sistertalk by Daniel Levy, the brother of frontman Gabriel Levy, after watching Evans perform around London. The band released their first and only single, "Vitriol", on 8 February 2019.

He joined Black Midi as a keyboardist and touring member between 2020 and 2023, during which founding member Matt Kwasniewski-Kelvin departed from the band due to mental health issues in 2021. He contributed keyboards to two of the band's albums, Cavalcade (2021) and Hellfire (2022).

Later, he joined HMLTD after their previous keyboardist, Zac, left the band in 2019 due to conflicts with the band's label, Sony. He first briefly toured with the band before the COVID-19 pandemic lockdown, before properly joining as a member in 2021. Their drummer Achilleas Sarantaris admitted that, with the exception of Evans, the band's members were "not very skilled musicians". He performed as keyboardist for their second album, The Worm (2023).

Geordie Greep gave Evans the nickname "Shank" after telling him, "You should be called Shank," without context. He later worked with Greep as producer of his debut album The New Sound (2024), contributing vocals to the track "Motorbike". Evans and Greep originally intended to create an album together, agreeing to write songs separately, though Greep took over songwriting duties after writing substantially more than Evans had.

After fellow Black Midi bandmate Cameron Picton unveiled his new project, My New Band Believe, Evans played piano on, produced, and mixed the band's first two singles, "Lecture 25" and "Numerology". Evans has produced two singles by Man/Woman/Chainsaw, "Only Girl" and "Nosedive" with Margo Broom.

== Discography ==
=== with Black Midi ===
- Cavalcade (2021)
- Hellfire (2022)

=== with HMLTD ===
- The Worm (2023)

=== with Geordie Greep ===
- The New Sound (2024)

=== with My New Band Believe ===
- "Lecture 25" (2025)
- "Numerology" (2026)
