= West of Eden (album) =

Studio album by HMLTD
- Released: 7 February 2020
- Genre: Art punk
- Length: 49:20
- Label: Lucky Number Music
- Producers: HMLTD, Rodaidh McDonald, Gianluca Buccellati

HMLTD chronology
Hate Music Last Time Delete (2018)	West of Eden (2020)	Don't Leave Me (2021)

Singles from West of Eden
- 1. "Death Drive" Released: 9 November 2018; 2. "LOADED" Released: 18 September 2019; 3. "The West Is Dead" Released: 29 October 2019; 4. "Why?" Released: 5 December 2019; 5. "Blank Slate" Released: 23 January 2020

West of Eden is the debut studio album by the British band HMLTD. It was released on 7 February 2020 through Lucky Number Music.

Five singles were released ahead of the album: "Death Drive", "LOADED", "The West Is Dead" co-written and produced by Gianluca Buccellati, "Why?", and "Blank Slate".

== Critical reception ==
Professional ratings
Aggregate scores
Source	Rating
AnyDecentMusic?	7.3/10
Metacritic	73/100
Review scores
Source	Rating
DIY	4/5 stars
Loud and Quiet	6/10
The Line of Best Fit	9/10
The Guardian	4/5 stars
Mojo	4/5 stars
musicOMH	5/5 stars
Q	2/5 stars
The Quietus	5/10
Uncut	7/10
Paste Magazine	8/10

West of Eden was well received by music critics upon release. On review aggregator website, Metacritic, West of Eden has an average critic score of 73 out of 100, indicating "generally favorable reviews" based on nine critics. On AnyDecentMusic?, West of Eden has an average score of 7.3 out of 10 based on ten contemporary music critic scores. On Album of the Year, West of Eden has an average score of 82 out of 100 based on seven critics.

Nicoletta Wylde, writing for musicOMH, gave the album a perfect five star rating, describing West of Eden as an ode to millennial humour. Wylde states "One message is loud and clear in West Of Eden. ANGER. BILE. FIRE. MURDER. Because what is art without bile? Millennial humour is furious and surreal, driven by anti-depressants and anxiety. What we’ve got now is a world full of millennials that have grown up to make art about these injustices. HMLTD have done just that, focusing their trials and tribulations through a magnifying glass to burn us mere ants. And oh, how I love a bit of self-immolation."

Lizzie Manno, writing for Paste Magazine, gave West of Eden an 8 out of 10, describing the album as "an ambitious depiction of humanity's downfall". Delving into the conceptual elements of the record, Manno finds West of Eden as "[crowning] HMLTD as one of few bands with a serious claim to artistic vision and sonic uniqueness." Tristan Gatward, writing for Loud and Quiet magazine gave West of Eden a 6 out of 10, stating that "their patchwork labyrinthine stories are only mostly enthralling – the whole piece doesn't quite match the promises of full technicolour."

== Track listing ==
West of Eden track listing
No.	Title	Length
1.	"The West Is Dead"	3:03
2.	"LOADED"	3:17
3.	"The Ballad of Calamity James"	1:32
4.	"To the Door"	3:19
5.	"Satan, Luella & I"	6:29
6.	"Mikey's Song"	3:37
7.	"Why?"	2:38
8.	"149" (featuring Tallulah Eden)	2:58
9.	"Joanna"	2:22
10.	"Where's Joanna?"	3:51
11.	"Death Drive"	3:38
12.	"Nobody Stays in Love"	3:28
13.	"MMXX A.D."	0:49
14.	"Blank Slate"	3:45
15.	"War Is Looming"	4:35
Total length:		49:20

Notes

- "Loaded" is stylised in all caps.

== See also ==
- List of 2020 albums
