= WBHM =

Public radio station in Birmingham, Alabama, United States

- Birmingham, Alabama; United States
- Broadcast area: Birmingham metropolitan area
- Frequency: 90.3 MHz (HD Radio)
- Branding: WBHM

Programming
- Format: Public radio, talk and classical
- Subchannels: HD2: Classical 24
- Affiliations: NPR; APM; PRX

Ownership
- Owner: University of Alabama at Birmingham; (Board of Trustees of the University of Alabama)

History
- First air date: December 5, 1976
- Call sign meaning: "Birmingham"

Technical information
- Licensing authority: FCC
- Facility ID: 4240
- Class: C1
- ERP: 32,000 watts
- HAAT: 370 meters (1,210 ft)
- Transmitter coordinates: 33°29′19″N 86°47′58″W
- Translator: 106.1 W291DC (Birmingham)

Links
- Public license information: Public file; LMS
- Webcast: Listen live
- Website: www.wbhm.org

WBHM (90.3 FM) is a non-commercial radio station licensed to Birmingham, Alabama, United States. Licensed and managed by the University of Alabama at Birmingham, WBHM features a mixture of news, talk and classical music programming sourced from NPR, American Public Media and Public Radio Exchange, with studios located on 11th Street South.

WBHM's transmitter is sited in Vulcan Park. The station broadcasts in HD Radio alongside "The Hub" on the secondary HD2 FM translator W291DC at 106.1 MHz in Birmingham with the marketing tagline Arts, Culture, & Community.

== History ==
=== Early years ===
Even though Huntsville was selected instead of Birmingham, the state's largest city in 1976 (in population), for getting Alabama's first public radio station in October 1976 (the present WLRH), WBHM did not lag far behind, beginning operations on December 5. WBHM became Birmingham's full-time classical music station since the demise of a commercial FM outlet, WSFM, which gave way to the present WDJC-FM in 1968.

By the 1990s, WBHM discontinued local classical hosts. It switched to syndicated programming from the Classical Public Radio Network, a joint production of KUSC-FM Los Angeles and Colorado Public Radio, to provide programming in the middays, evenings, and overnight. Weekday mornings and afternoons were dedicated to news and information programming, largely from National Public Radio.

When CPRN shut down operations in 2008, WBHM switched to an all-news/discussion format in the daytime hours with programming from PRI and NPR, a move that several other previously classical-formatted NPR affiliates elsewhere have made in recent times. Classical music is now heard on WBHM after 8 p.m. Mondays through Fridays, 10 p.m. on Saturdays and Midnight on Sundays. Also on Sunday nights, two long-running atmospheric music programs, Echoes and Hearts of Space, air on WBHM.

=== WSGN ===
WSGN began operation as WEXP (for experiment) on February 11, 1975, primarily as a training facility for Gadsden State Community College's broadcasting department. The station was assembled using equipment donated by several Alabama radio stations and by Rick Maze of Birmingham, plus purchases from the State of Alabama Surplus Property warehouse. Construction was performed by broadcast instructors Don Smith and Bob Mayben with assistance from WBRC-TV personnel in Birmingham.

The station was operated by students and faculty for many years. When both Smith and Mayben left the school for other interests, new instructor Neil Mullen took over the station operation and a cooperative arrangement was struck with WBHM to provide programming.

The call letters of WSGN (for founder Birmingham News, the "South's Greatest Newspaper") date back to the beginning of radio broadcasting in the state, and were formerly located in Birmingham at 610 on the AM dial. In fact, there was a WSGN-FM in the 1950s which today is known as WDJC in Birmingham. The call letters were changed under Mullens' leadership when WSGN 610 AM was sold to a company that did not want to use the call letters, but did not want another station in Birmingham to be able to use them, so another deal was struck to rename WEXP as WSGN. As of 2013, the WEXP call letters are located in Brandon, Vermont.

On September 30, 2018, WSGN ceased broadcasting programming from WBHM as Gadsden State Community College sold the license to a non-profit religious broadcaster. The sale, to Educational Media Foundation, was consummated on January 31, 2019. GSCC had discontinued its broadcasting curriculum some years earlier, leaving the school no further use for the station.

=== Gulf States Newsroom ===
In 2020, WBHM spearheaded the creation of the Gulf States Newsroom, a regional news collaboration with Mississippi Public Broadcasting, WWNO (New Orleans), and WRKF (Baton Rouge). This initiative, supported by the Corporation for Public Broadcasting (CPB) and NPR, aimed to strengthen regional news coverage. CPB provided a $1.27 million grant over 44 months, facilitating the establishment of six new reporting positions and two editing roles.

The Gulf States Newsroom was initially headquartered at WBHM, where a managing editor coordinated content collaboration among regional partners and national platforms. It became a part of the regional network alongside newsrooms in Texas and California, which initially received support from CPB and have since grown into regional hubs for NPR.

=== Financial difficulties ===
The station reported operating losses exceeding $300,000 in the fiscal years 2020 and 2021. Executive Director William Dahlberg stated in March 2023, that WBHM needed to downsize its team to maintain financial sustainability. Although Dahlberg did not disclose the number of positions eliminated, former employees stated that four people had been laid off from the station. Among them were Program Director Michael Krall and reporter Cody D. Short.

== Local programs ==
Tapestry --Originally a weekly 30-minute program, the show spotlights aspects of Birmingham's local artistic and musical scene, as well as features interviews with artists coming through the Birmingham region, hosted by Greg Bass. From July 2009 to 2013, the program was reduced in frequency to a 60-minute monthly broadcast. Arts-related segments on WBHM are now a part of regular news and feature shows, but Tapestry is no longer broadcast over the air. Tapestry archival programs and segments are still available on the WBHM website.

The WBHM news department has local updates inserted in Morning Edition (weekdays from 5-9 a.m.) and All Things Considered (weekdays from 3-6 p.m.).
