= WJAB =

- Huntsville, Alabama; United States
- Frequency: 90.9 MHz (HD Radio)

Programming
- Format: Jazz/Blues
- Subchannels: HD2: Blues
- Affiliations: NPR; PRX

Ownership
- Owner: Alabama A&M University

History
- First air date: October 2, 1991
- Call sign meaning: Jazz And Blues

Technical information
- Licensing authority: FCC
- Facility ID: 697
- Class: C1
- ERP: 100,000 watts
- HAAT: 102 meters (335 ft)
- Transmitter coordinates: 34°47′09″N 86°34′00″W

Links
- Public license information: Public file; LMS
- Webcast: Listen live
- Website: wjab.org

WJAB (90.9 FM) is a NPR-affiliated college radio station in Huntsville, Alabama. It primarily features jazz and blues music programming aimed toward African-American residents of the northern counties of Alabama and several counties in southern middle Tennessee. WJAB's signal travels in about a 120-mile radius.

The station is licensed to Alabama Agricultural and Mechanical University (known as "Alabama A&M" for short) in Normal, Alabama, which is actually located within the city of Huntsville. The Telecommunications Center of the university operates the station partly as a laboratory for student announcers, producers, and journalists.

== History ==
Beginning in the late 1970s, Alabama A&M made numerous attempts to obtain funding from the state of Alabama and the Corporation for Public Broadcasting in order to establish a radio station of its own. The FCC originally allocated the callsign WAED for the station. The call sign was previously owned by The Big JAB, an AM station in Westbrook, Maine.

The Telecommunications Center under the direction of Dr. Hayward O. Handy and Elizabeth Sloan-Ragland, both now deceased, was best known during the 1970s and 1980s for producing several weekly public affairs and features shows seen on Alabama Public Television, including Montage and Upstate. The center also produced The Alabama A&M Football Review with announcer Ike Rooks, which aired on Huntsville-area commercial television stations.

After years of bureaucratic wrangling and waiting for governments to afford the needed appropriations, AAMU realized its goal in 1991. Since that time, the station has consistently placed the concerns of its listeners in very high regard with programming such as interview shows, music of all varieties throughout the Pan-African world, and live broadcasts of AAMU football and men's basketball games.

The station was assigned the WJAB call letters by the Federal Communications Commission on January 23, 1990.

Notable personalities have included "The Maestro" Shawn Patrick, Jackie Anderson, Marcus Simms, Joy Sidney, Douglas Turner, Theodore Lindsey, Heidi Traylor, Joyce Coffman, Kerry Macklin, Erica Fox, Don Juan, Toni Neal, Sam Terry, Ellen Washington, Billy “Brother B.J.” Lewis, Shannon Rice and Chris Carlisle.

Former logo

== See also ==
- List of college radio stations in the United States
- List of jazz radio stations in the United States
