= WVUA-FM =

Student-run radio station at the University of Alabama

- Tuscaloosa, Alabama; United States
- Frequency: 90.7 MHz
- Branding: 90.7 The Capstone

Programming
- Format: Adult album alternative

Ownership
- Owner: The University of Alabama
- Sister stations: WVUA-CD, WVUA, WUAL

History
- First air date: 1981
- Call sign meaning: The Voice of the University of Alabama

Technical information
- Licensing authority: FCC
- Facility ID: 4242
- Class: A
- ERP: 220 watts
- HAAT: 56 meters (184 ft)
- Transmitter coordinates: 33°12′34″N 87°32′56″W

Links
- Public license information: Public file; LMS
- Webcast: Listen live (via TuneIn)
- Website: wvuafm.ua.edu

WVUA-FM (90.7 FM, "The Capstone") is the student-run college radio station at the University of Alabama. The station was established for the purpose of giving students an environment in which they could learn to be radio broadcasters.

== History ==
WVUA was chartered in 1981, although student-run stations existed at UA since 1941. WVUA has changed its name and call letters a few times. It has been referred to as "V-91", "Rock of The South", and "New Rock 90.7" but it currently operates under the branding, "90.7 The Capstone". (The Capstone is a nickname for the University of Alabama.) Student-run UA radio stations have used the call letters BRN (Bama Radio Network), WABP, and WUAL (now part of Alabama Public Radio). Originally, the "VUA" in the station's call letters was used to suggest the "Voice of the University of Alabama", which is a tagline the station often uses.

Starting in May 2007, the station began a revitalization project to make it "an agent for a collaborative community". This effort included collaborations with the Student Government Association, The Crimson White, the College of Nursing, Stillman College, University Programs, and more.

WVUA emphasizes local music that derives directly from the Tuscaloosa community. It airs local music and hosts benefit concerts that feature local bands.

About two-thirds of WVUA’s operating budget is raised through sponsorships, benefits and other student-led fundraising efforts.

WVUA also uses the tagline "The Capstone Sports Authority". It is the radio home for Crimson Tide gymnastics, soccer, and volleyball. Live coverage of UA football, men's basketball, baseball, and softball, among others, is licensed to commercial broadcasting entities. Due to conflicting schedules, only home matches for soccer and volleyball are broadcast on the station, while both home and away events are broadcast for gymnastics. Before each football home game, the station airs "Crimson Tide GameDay". The station features sports in "The Student Section."

== Programming ==
Programming on the station features many specialty shows that air weekly. When a specialty show is not airing on the station, WVUA runs an alternative-rock format, hosted by several regular or "playlist" DJs.

The specialty shows on the station include a wide variety of genres, including electronic, indie, soul, R&B, industrial rock, folk, hip-hop, variety, metal, and jam.

The station streams all of its content, including its sports and music, from its Website: wvuafm.ua.edu.

WVUA is maintained by the UA Office of Student Media, which is also the parent organization of UA's campus newspaper, The Crimson White.

WVUA is located in the Student Media Building at 414 Campus Drive East, Tuscaloosa, AL 35487. The building also houses The Crimson White, Marr's Field Journal and Student Media administrators.

== See also ==
- List of college radio stations in the United States
