= WUAL-FM =

Alabama Public Radio station in Tuscaloosa, Alabama

- Tuscaloosa, Alabama; United States
- Broadcast area: Central Alabama
- Frequency: 91.5 MHz (HD Radio)
- Branding: Alabama Public Radio

Programming
- Format: Public radio
- Subchannels: HD2: UA Info Radio (Campus radio); HD3: Jazz - BBC World Service
- Affiliations: NPR; APM; PRX

Ownership
- Owner: University of Alabama; (University of Alabama)

History
- First air date: September 7, 1982
- Call sign meaning: University of Alabama

Technical information
- Licensing authority: FCC
- Facility ID: 69168
- Class: C1
- ERP: 100,000 watts
- HAAT: 158 meters (518 ft)
- Transmitter coordinates: 33°5′40″N 87°24′47″W
- Translator: HD2: 92.5 W223BZ (Tuscaloosa)

Links
- Public license information: Public file; LMS
- Webcast: Listen live
- Website: apr.org ready.ua.edu/925fm/ (HD2)

WUAL-FM (91.5 FM) is a non-commercial radio station licensed to Tuscaloosa, Alabama, United States. It is owned by the University of Alabama and is the flagship station of Alabama Public Radio. It signed on the air on September 7, 1982.

WUAL-FM is a Class C1 station. It has an effective radiated power (ERP) of 100,000 watts, the maximum for most FM stations. The signal covers a region extending from Birmingham in the east to beyond the state line of Mississippi in the west.

== Programming ==
Alabama Public Radio programming includes news, talk, classical music, folk music, jazz and adult album alternative. Weekdays begin with Morning Edition, with All Things Considered, Fresh Air and Marketplace heard in late afternoons. Middays and evenings feature classical music, including Performance Today. The BBC World Service runs overnight.

== See also ==
- Alabama Public Radio
