= Caroline 2 =

Studio album by Caroline
- Released: 30 May 2025
- Recorded: 2023–2025
- Studio: Big Jelly Studios, Ramsgate
- Length: 39:42
- Label: Rough Trade
- Producer: Casper Hughes; Jasper Llewellyn; Mike O'Malley

Caroline chronology
Caroline (2022)	Caroline 2 (2025)

Singles from Caroline 2
- 1. "Total Euphoria" Released: 18 March 2025; 2. "Tell Me I Never Knew That" Released: 15 April 2025

Caroline 2 is the second studio album by British rock band Caroline, released on 30 May 2025 through Rough Trade Records. The album received acclaim from critics.

== Background ==
Caroline 2 was created over the course of 18 months during several writing sessions across the United Kingdom, with most of the recording done at Big Jelly Studios in Ramsgate. The album was produced by the band, with engineering by Syd Kemp, mixing by Jason Agel, and mastering by Heba Kadry. It was announced on 15 April 2025, coinciding with the release of the lead single, "Tell Me I Never Knew That", featuring American musician Caroline Polachek.

== Critical reception ==
Professional ratings
Aggregate scores
Source	Rating
AnyDecentMusic?	8.4/10
Metacritic	87/100
Review scores
Source	Rating
AllMusic	4.5/5 stars
Clash	8/10
DIY	4/5 stars
Exclaim!	8/10
The Line of Best Fit	8/10
Mojo	4/5 stars
NME	5/5 stars
Pitchfork	8.4/10
The Skinny	4/5 stars
Slant Magazine	5/5 stars

On Metacritic, which assigns a normalized score out of 100 to ratings from mainstream publications, the album received a weighted mean score of 87 based on 15 reviews, indicating "universal acclaim". Writing for Slant Magazine, Nick Seip awarded the album a perfect score of five stars, describing it as "an album of collisions: between time and space, past and present, precision and spontaneity," and praised its "fluidity" and "refusal to resolve". Stereogum writer Chris Deville gave the album the accolade "Album of the Week," highlighting its innovative approach to post-rock and emphasizing its dynamic contrasts and experimental production. Deville noted the band's ability to blend various genres and sounds, creating a unique soundscape. Building on their first album, Caroline 2 marks the second chapter of the band "learning how to speak a unique musical language". Ian Cohen of Pitchfork awarded Caroline 2 the distinction of Best New Music and called it "a profound listening experience" that enables the band to "fully embrace their role as UK post-rock's preeminent sentimentalists".

Devin Birse at The Line of Best Fit highlighted the album's experimental approach, stating that Caroline 2 "tears apart the clichés of rock, bringing in the endlessly shifting vocals of hyperpop and collage-style production of experimental rap to fracture and reassemble the traditions of not merely rock as a genre but post-rock itself." Eric Hill of Exclaim! praised Caroline 2 for its "organic growth" and boundary-pushing "improvisation," noting that the album "feels like the kind of organic growth that comes when a group is comfortable with improvisation and pushing boundaries." Steve Chick of Mojo rated the album four stars, noting its "newfound earnestness and openness to Caroline's songcraft," and described it as "more accessible and lucid" than their debut.

== Track listing ==
All music is composed by Hugh Aynsley, Oliver Hamilton, Casper Hughes, Jasper Llewellyn, Magdalena McLean, Alex McKenzie, Mike O'Malley, and Frederick Wordsworth.

Caroline 2 track listing
No.	Title	Lyrics	Length
1.	"Total Euphoria"	Llewellyn	4:30
2.	"Song Two"	Llewellyn	3:32
3.	"Tell Me I Never Knew That" (with Caroline Polachek)	Llewellyn; McLean; O'Malley; Caroline Polachek	4:39
4.	"When I Get Home"	Llewellyn	6:05
5.	"U R Ur Only Aching"	Hughes; Llewellyn; McLean; O'Malley	4:37
6.	"Coldplay Cover"	Llewellyn	4:16
7.	"Two Riders Down"	Hughes; Llewellyn; O'Malley	6:39
8.	"Beautiful Ending"	Llewellyn; McLean; O'Malley	5:24
Total length:			39:42

== Personnel ==
Credits adapted from Tidal.

=== Caroline ===
- Hugh Aynsley – drums (tracks 1–7), choir vocals (4)
- Oliver Hamilton – violin (tracks 1–4, 7, 8), vocals (5), acoustic guitar (6)
- Casper Hughes – production (all tracks), electric guitar (tracks 1, 2, 4, 5, 7), acoustic guitar (3, 8), choir vocals (4, 5), engineering (5), guitar (6)
- Jasper Llewellyn – production, engineering (all tracks); vocals (tracks 1, 2), cymbals (3), acoustic guitar (4–6), guitar (7), cello (8)
- Magdalena McLean – vocals (tracks 1, 3, 5, 6), viola (2, 4, 7, 8)
- Alex McKenzie – bass clarinet (all tracks), choir vocals (tracks 4, 5)
- Mike O'Malley – production, engineering (all tracks); electric guitar (tracks 1–3, 7), banjo (4, 6), acoustic guitar (5), guitar (8)
- Frederick Wordsworth – trombone (tracks 1, 2, 4, 8), bass guitar (1, 5, 7), trumpet (3), choir vocals (4, 5), vocals (6)

=== Additional contributors ===
- Heba Kadry – mastering
- Jason Agel – mixing
- Syd Kemp – engineering
- Fabian Prynn – engineering (track 1)
- Mike Collins – engineering (tracks 2–5, 7, 8)
- Neil Goody – engineering (track 3)
- Caroline Polachek – vocals (track 3)
- Cameron Picton – choir vocals (tracks 4, 5)
- Joel Burton – choir vocals (tracks 4, 5)
- Josh Barfoot – choir vocals (tracks 4, 5)
- Naima Bock – choir vocals (tracks 4, 5)
- Nancy Barnes – choir vocals (tracks 4, 5)
- Poppy Hankin – choir vocals (tracks 4, 5)
- Daniel S. Evans – DJ (tracks 4, 8), choir vocals (4)
- Issy Armstrong – choir vocals (track 4)
- Kiran Leonard – choir vocals (track 4)
- Lottie Pendlebury – choir vocals (track 4)
- Jennifer Walton – DJ (track 4)

== Charts ==
Chart performance for Caroline 2
Chart (2025)	Peak position
Scottish Albums (OCC)	9
UK Albums (OCC)	88
UK Independent Albums (OCC)	3
