= List of Rough Trade artists =

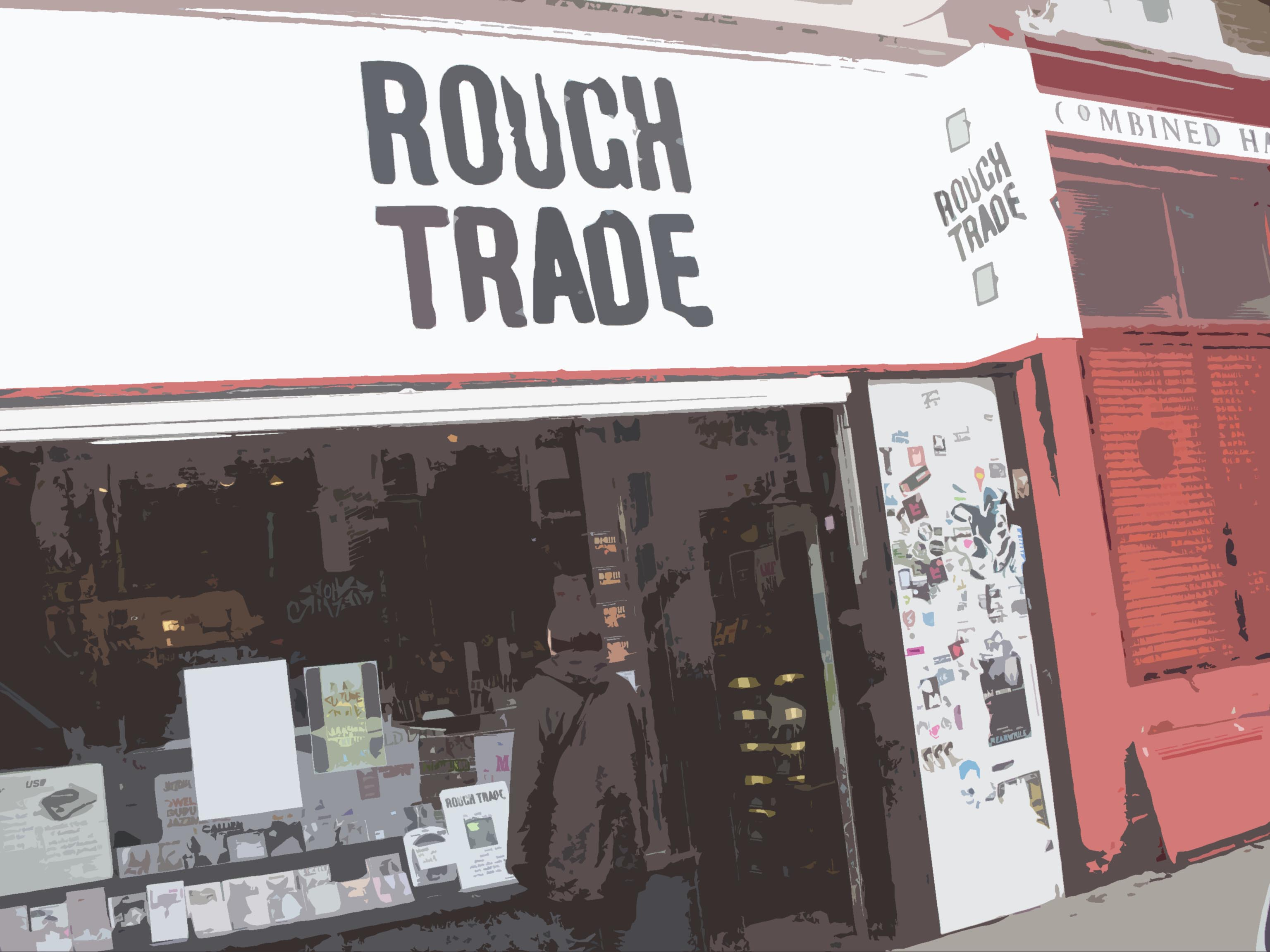
Rough Trade's retail shop

This is a list of notable bands and solo artists that signed with UK-based record label Rough Trade Records.

== Notable artists ==
=== Current ===
- 1990s
- Adam Green
- Alabama Shakes
- Albert Hammond Jr.
- Alela Diane
- Alexander
- Anohni and the Johnsons
- Arcade Fire
- Arthur Russell
- Basia Bulat
- Belle and Sebastian
- Benjamin Booker
- caroline
- Dean Blunt
- The Decemberists
- The Detroit Cobras
- Destroyer
- Dylan LeBlanc
- Eddi Reader
- Edward Sharpe & The Magnetic Zeros
- Emiliana Torrini
- Geordie Greep
- Gilla Band
- God Help the Girl
- Goat Girl
- Gruff Rhys
- The Hidden Cameras
- The Hold Steady
- Houndmouth
- Islands
- Jarvis Cocker
- Jeffrey Lewis
- Jenny Lewis
- Jockstrap
- Julian Casablancas
- The Libertines
- Little Joy
- The Long Blondes
- Micachu
- Miracle Fortress
- The Moldy Peaches
- Monsters of Folk
- The Morning Benders
- My Morning Jacket
- My New Band Believe
- Mystery Jets
- Palma Violets
- Pantha du Prince
- Parquet Courts
- Pigs Pigs Pigs Pigs Pigs Pigs Pigs
- Pinegrove
- POP ETC
- The Prettiots
- Princess Nokia
- Pulp
- Rodrigo Amarante
- Rox
- Scritti Politti
- Sea Power
- Shockabilly
- Skull Disco
- Sleaford Mods
- SOAK
- Starcrawler
- Strange Boys
- Stray Heart
- The Strokes
- The Smiths
- Sufjan Stevens
- Super Furry Animals
- Taken by Trees
- The Veils
- Trance
- Rachel Unthank & The Winterset
- Warpaint
- Yim Yames

=== Current and past ===
- 1990s
- A R Kane
- A.R.E. Weapons
- Aberfeldy
- Adam Green
- Ryan Adams
- Alabama Shakes
- Alela Diane
- Horace Andy
- Antony and the Johnsons
- Arcade Fire
- Aztec Camera
- Babyshambles
- Bacio di Tosca
- The Band of Holy Joy
- The Bats
- Baxter Dury
- Beangrowers
- Beat Happening
- Bell Orchestre
- Belle & Sebastian
- Bernard Butler
- Black Midi
- Blue Orchids
- Brakes
- British Sea Power
- Basia Bulat
- The Burning Hell
- Butterfly Child
- Butthole Surfers
- Cabaret Voltaire
- Camper Van Beethoven
- Cardiacs
- Carter USM
- Cathedral
- Chris & Cosey
- Chris Thomas
- Jarvis Cocker
- Colorfinger
- Cornershop
- Ivor Cutler
- Dean Blunt
- The Decemberists
- The Del Fuegos
- Delays
- Delta 5
- The Detroit Cobras
- Die Krupps
- Cara Dillon
- Disco Inferno
- The Dream Syndicate
- Duffy
- Bill Drummond
- Easterhouse
- Eddi Reader
- Elizabeth Fraser
- Emiliana Torrini
- Essential Logic
- Tav Falco's Panther Burns
- The Fall
- feedtime
- The Feelies
- The Fiery Furnaces
- Galaxie 500
- Giant Sand
- Gilla Band
- The Go-Betweens.
- God Help the Girl
- Vic Godard
- Gruff Rhys
- Hal
- Albert Hammond, Jr.
- The Heart Throbs
- The Hidden Cameras
- The Hold Steady
- Houndmouth
- Howard Bilerman
- Howler
- Hope Sandoval & The Warm Inventions
- Islands
- Gregory Isaacs
- The Jackofficers
- James
- Jockstrap
- Johnny Flynn & the Sussex Wit
- Freedy Johnston
- Richard H. Kirk
- David Kitt
- Kleenex
- The Last Words
- Levitation
- Jeffrey Lewis
- Jenny Lewis
- The Libertines
- LiLiPUT
- Little Joy
- Los Lobos
- The Long Blondes
- Thomas Mapfumo
- Cerys Matthews
- Massacra
- Mazzy Star
- Métal Urbain
- Micachu
- Microdisney
- The Mighty Diamonds
- Miracle Legion
- Miracle Fortress
- The Moldy Peaches
- The Monochrome Set
- The Morning Benders
- Monsters of Folk
- The Motorcycle Boy
- My Morning Jacket
- Mystery Jets
- The Mr. T Experience
- Ooberman
- Opal
- The Ophelias
- Palma Violets
- Pantha du Prince
- Parquet Courts
- Lee Perry
- Pere Ubu
- Pinegrove
- Pooka
- The Pop Group
- Protex
- Pulp
- Pussy Galore
- QueenAdreena
- The Raincoats
- The Red Crayola
- Jonathan Richman
- Robert Rental
- Royal City
- Arthur Russell
- Sahotas
- Scissors for Lefty
- Scrawl
- Scritti Politti
- The Seers
- Shelleyan Orphan
- Short Dogs Grow
- Shrimp Boat
- Sleaford Mods
- The Smiths
- Soul Asylum
- Souled American
- Epic Soundtracks
- Spizzenergi
- Spring Heel Jack
- Sufjan Stevens
- Stiff Little Fingers
- Straitjacket Fits
- Strange Boys
- Stray Heart
- The Strokes
- Subway Sect
- The Sundays
- Super Furry Animals
- Sweet Jesus
- Swell Maps
- Television Personalities
- They Might Be Giants
- This Heat
- Toiling Midgets
- Two Nice Girls
- James "Blood" Ulmer
- Ultramarine
- Taken by Trees
- The Virgin Prunes
- The Veils
- Venom
- Vomit Launch
- Warpaint
- Weekend
- Lucinda Williams
- Victoria Williams
- The Woodentops
- Robert Wyatt
- Young Marble Giants
- Zounds

== See also ==
- Rough Trade Shop
- Lists of record labels

== Sources ==
- Rob Young. Rough Trade. Black Dog Publishing, ISBN 1-904772-47-1
