= Goat Girl (disambiguation) =

Goat Girl is an English post-punk band.

Goat Girl may also refer to:

- Goat Girl (album)
- Goat Girl (film)
- The Goat Girl
- Goat Girl (television series)

== See also ==
- Tieta, also known as Tieta the Goat Girl
