= My New Band Believe (album) =

2026 studio album by My New Band Believe

Studio album by My New Band Believe
- Released: 10 April 2026
- Recorded: August 2024 – August 2025
- Length: 36:34
- Label: Rough Trade
- Producers: Cameron Picton; Jasper Llewellyn; Mike O'Malley

Singles from My New Band Believe
- 1. "Numerology (Note: Non-album single; "Numerology" is instead included on deluxe editions of My New Band Believe, either on a 10" with vinyl editions or a bonus disk with CD editions.)" Released: February 17, 2026; 2. "Love Story" Released: March 17, 2026

My New Band Believe is the debut studio album by the English indie band My New Band Believe. It released on 10 April 2026 through Rough Trade Records. The band was formed by Cameron Picton, formerly of Black Midi, and features a range of musicians such as Kiran Leonard, Caius Williams, Steve Noble and Andrew Cheetham. Instrumentalists on the album included members of Caroline, another English band adjacent to the Windmill scene. A non-album single appearing on deluxe editions, "Numerology", was released on 17 February, while "Love Story" was released on 17 March.

== Background and production ==
In August 2024, it was announced experimental rock band Black Midi, a band which Picton performed bass guitar and vocals for, went on hiatus. Picton would start releasing music and touring under the alias "Camera Picture", starting with a CD-only album 44m50s. Other mixtapes such as 36m33s and 24m56s would also be released as Picton continued to tour. Picton later stated that he released these mixtapes in order to take the pressure off of releasing music officially, and to gauge interest for his future work. Releasing CD versions of these mixtapes also helped him fund recording sessions for My New Band Believe.

During this period, Picton began playing solo shows at venues like the Windmill, and was approached by the band Caroline to produce a collaborative album. The artists' collaboration would eventually lead to Picton's My New Band Believe. Picton said that "functionally" the album was created as a solo record, but that his role was to curate what he had already created with other instrumentalists.

In February 2025, My New Band Believe released their first single, "Lecture 25", with a video directed by Jack Shep. The song started as a demo, before a band was conceived and the song was mixed and mastered within a period of eight days. The song featured Picton on guitar and vocals, Seth Evans on piano, King David Ike-Elechi on drums and Josh Finerty on bass. Following the release of the single, the band would tour extensively, featuring revolving casts of musicians.

The album was recorded across 29 days starting in August 2024, eventually finishing production in December 2025. The band worked at 11 studios across London with a total of 9 different recording engineers.

== Recording ==
During the recording process for My New Band Believe, Picton and other instrumentalists did not make demo recordings. Instead, band members recorded each song live multiple times, with Picton stitching the recordings together to make master versions for the final album. Picton said that Caroline band members spent a large amount of time first talking over how the music should sound before they recorded songs. This style marked a departure from his experiences with Black Midi, who first recorded music and then decided where the record should go from there.

Picton is the only lead vocalist on My New Band Believe.

== Lyrics and songs ==
On My New Band Believe, Picton took a spontaneous approach to songwriting. The album's lyrics encompassed multiple perspectives and voices, with each song building on the last. Picton likened the album's narrative style to "found footage", saying that its themes were not part of a concrete storyline, instead constituting a set of "impersonal" stories.

"Numerology" was not included on the album because it was recorded live and unmastered, and sounded too different from the sonic quality of the rest of the album.

Picton stated that “Heart of Darkness” had a similar lyrical quality to Joseph Conrad's novella of the same name, but said that the song was not initially inspired by the work.

== Release ==
On 16 February 2026, the band announced a music video for a new song, "Numerology", would release the next day. The song was described as an experimental, frantic and "lyrically abstract" song with "decidedly minimal processing". On the day of its release, My New Band Believe was announced to be released on 10 April through Rough Trade Records. It was also noted that "Numerology" would not appear on the album, instead being present on deluxe vinyl and CD copies. Other members in the band present on the album include Kiran Leonard, Caius Williams, Steve Noble and Andrew Cheetham. The album was described as being almost entirely acoustic, with minimal effects and electronic processing. A second single, though the first included on the album's tracklist, "Love Story", was released on 17 March with an accompanying music video. In support of the album, the band will tour, starting in April in The Hague and ending in May in Oxford.

== Reception ==
Professional ratings
Aggregate scores
Source	Rating
AnyDecentMusic?	8.3/10
Metacritic	86/100
Review scores
Source	Rating
AllMusic	3.5/5 stars
Clash	9/10
DIY	4.5/5 stars
The Guardian	4/5 stars
Mojo	4/5 stars
NME	5/5 stars
Pitchfork	8.4/10
The Skinny	4/5 stars
Slant Magazine	4/5 stars
Uncut	9/10

According to the review aggregator Metacritic, My New Band Believe received "universal acclaim" based on a weighted average score of 86 out of 100 from twelve critic scores. The review aggregator Any Decent Music gave the album a weighted average score of 8.3 out of 10 from fifteen critic scores.

Patrick Clarke of NME commended the album's lyrics and ambition and accorded it a five star review. He concluded that the album is "as ambitious as it is ambiguous. In less skilled hands it could easily fall apart under its own weight. In Picton’s, however, it’s a masterpiece." In reviewing the album, Sam Sodomsky of Pitchfork wrote that Picton is "one of the most crucial voices in indie rock today". In a four star review, Alexis Petridis of The Guardian drew a positive contrast between My New Band Believe and Picton's work within Black Midi, writing that the album is "less distant, less inclined to showboating, easier to love – rather than merely admire – than Picton’s previous work, without ever feeling like it’s pandering to the listener. It’s admirably unbound by things such as standardised song structure, feels difficult to accurately pigeonhole and comes teeming with musical ideas from out of the ordinary – but it feels like it’s wearing its intelligence a little more lightly than its author once did, which might be the smartest move of all." The Needle Drop's Anthony Fantano complimented the record's folk and rock instrumentation, but criticised the processing of Picton's vocals as too understated and soft.

== Track listing ==
All tracks are written by Cameron Picton.

My New Band Believe track listing
No.	Title	Length
1.	"Target Practice"	2:05
2.	"In the Blink of an Eye"	5:13
3.	"Heart of Darkness"	8:31
4.	"Love Story"	3:46
5.	"Pearls"	3:29
6.	"Opposite Teacher"	2:52
7.	"Actress"	8:20
8.	"One Night"	2:18
Total length:		36:34

Deluxe 10" track listing
No.	Title	Length
1.	"Numerology (One Night)"	4:20
2.	"Numerology (One Night) (Instrumental)"	4:20
Total length:		8:40

Deluxe CD track listing
No.	Title	Length
1.	"Numerology"	4:20
2.	"Numerology (Instrumental)"	4:20
3.	"Numerology (Pre-Mix Edit)"	4:21
4.	"Numerology (Remix Solo)"	0:40
5.	"Numerology (One Night)"	4:20
6.	"Numerology (Demo)"	4:51
7.	"Numerology (71331295238)"	21:33
Total length:		44:25

== Personnel ==
Credits adapted from the album's liner notes.

=== My New Band Believe ===
- Alex Andropoulos – drum kit (2)
- Hugh Aynsley – drum kit (2, 4, 5)
- Finn Carter – piano (tracks 1, 2, 4, 7, 8), co-writing (3, 4), chorus (1, 5)
- Andrew Cheetham – drum kit (3)
- Josh Finerty – field recording (4), engineering, chorus (1, 5)
- Oliver Hamilton – fiddle (3–5, 8)
- George Johnson – saxophone (3, 7)
- Kiran Leonard – string arrangement (1, 2, 4, 7), co-writing (1, 2, 7)
- Jasper Llewellyn – cello (3), field recording (5), engineering, production
- Magdalena McLean – viola (3–6)
- Alex McKenzie – accordion (7), bass clarinet (4–6), clarinet (1, 3, 5), flute (1, 2, 5), saxophone (1, 3, 5), co-writing (8)
- Troy Njoku – piano (5)
- Steve Noble – drum kit (3, 6, 7), percussion (2, 3, 7)
- Cameron Picton – vocals, acoustic guitars; bamboo saxophone (2, 4, 5, 7), field recording (6), harmonica (7), mandolin (3), percussion (1–5, 7), piano (6), recorder (7), reed (2, 4, 5), toy accordion (1, 2, 4–7), xylophone (1, 7), saxophone (3), production, writing, engineering
- Nathan Pigott – saxophone (3)
- Jack Shep – split-voice (5), chorus (1, 3, 5, 7)
- Charlie Wayne – drum kit (7), percussion (7)
- Caius Williams – upright bass (1–4, 6, 7)
- Freddy Wordsworth – flugelhorn (4, 8), trombone (4, 5), trumpet (4, 8), chorus (1, 5)

=== Additional ===
- Rosie Alena – chorus (1, 3, 5, 7)
- Daisy Ayscough – chorus (1, 3, 5, 7)
- Alice Backstrom – chorus (1, 3, 7)
- Saya Barbalgia – chorus (3)
- Helena Beese – chorus (1, 3, 5, 7)
- Olivia Bowman – chorus (1, 3, 7)
- Felix Davidson – chorus (1, 3, 5, 7)
- Ginny Davies – chorus (1, 3, 5, 7)
- Louis Farmer – chorus (1, 3, 5, 7)
- Kaya Heaton – chorus (1, 5)
- Martha Irwin – chorus (1, 3, 5, 7), co-writing (7)
- Ella Kozores – chorus (1, 3, 5)
- Amber Lashley – chorus (1, 3, 5, 7)
- Matt Lulu – chorus (1, 3, 5, 7)
- India Mansfield – chorus (1, 3, 5, 7)
- Sarah Meth – chorus (1, 3, 5, 7)
- Will Nicholls – chorus (1, 3, 5, 7)
- May Robson – chorus (1, 3, 5, 7)
- Spencer Spencer – chorus (1, 5)
- Joe Taylor – chorus (1, 3, 5, 7)
- Eliette Harris – violin (1, 2, 4, 7)
- Freya Hicks – viola (1, 2, 4, 7)
- Nina Lim – violin (1, 2, 4, 7)
- Benedict Swindells – cello (1, 2, 4, 7)
- Georgia Ellery – co-writing (4)

=== Engineering ===
- Joe Osborne – engineering
- Sam Grant – mixing
- Robin Schmidt – mastering
- Simone Gallizio – engineering
- Mike O'Malley – production, engineering
- Dylan Mark – assistant engineering
- Andy Ramsay – engineering

=== Artwork ===
- Kuo Jun You – painting
- Espace Devenir – camera frame
- Molly Boniface – photography
- Joseph Bradley Hill – graphic design

== Charts ==
Chart performance for My New Band Believe
Chart (2026)	Peak position
Scottish Albums (Official Charts)	29
UK Albums Sales (OCC)	15
UK Independent Albums (Official Charts)	10
