= Jack Shep =

British actor

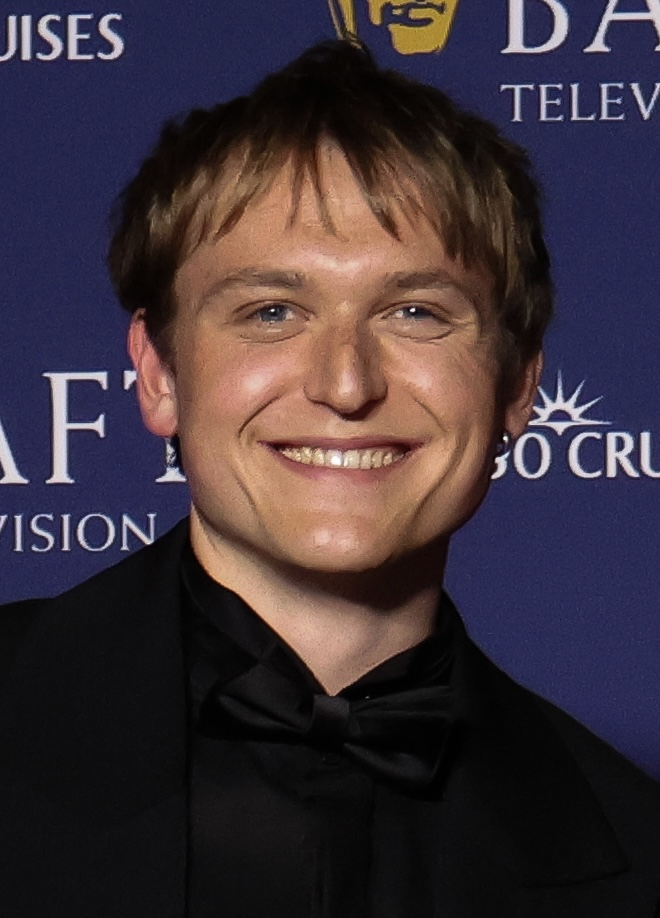
- Shep at the 2026 BAFTA TV Awards
- Born: 14 December 1999 (age 26); Bedfordshire, England
- Education: King’s College London
- Occupations: Actor, comedian, writer, director
- Television: Saturday Night Live UK; Changing Ends; Big Boys; One Day

Jack Shep (born 1999) is a British comedian, actor, writer and director. He is best known as a member of the first cast of Saturday Night Live UK, the British version of the long-running American sketch comedy show.

Outside of comedy, Shep is associated with the London-based Windmill music scene, where he has directed music videos for My New Band Believe, Westside Cowboy, Blossom Caldarone and Sarah Meth.

== Background and career ==
A native of Bedfordshire, Shep got his comedic start on TikTok, describing himself as "a gay teenager posting skits online." He began doing standup comedy in London; he was a finalist in a 2023 episode of the BBC New Comedy Awards, losing to Chantel Nash.

In 2022, he played "Maximilian the Posh Gay" in the Channel 4 series Big Boys. In 2024, he played Richard Hill in five episodes of Changing Ends on ITVX, and he had a small role in one episode of Netflix's One Day.

Since 2023, Shep has regularly hosted the comedy night Wanting to be Cool, Having to be Funny. Previous line-ups have included comedians like Sam Campbell, Ayoade Bamgboye and Bella Hull.

In 2026, Shep played Liam in Channel 4 comedy Break Clause.

He has described Tim Robinson and Patti Harrison as his comedy heroes.

== SNL UK ==
In February 2026, Shep was announced as the youngest member of the cast of Saturday Night Live UK.

In reviews of the series' debut episode on 21 March 2026, Shep was frequently singled out for praise by reviewers. The Guardian called his impression of Princess Diana "disturbingly good". The New York Times called Shep "the evening's M.V.P." (alongside costar Hammed Animashaun), saying he "showed signs of an Ashley Padilla-like breakout, with very funny and nuanced performances". Variety called Shep "one to look out for, pulling off a Diana impression so good that when the sketch itself didn't land you didn't care. Within minutes, he was in another as a dancing baby fetus. No idea what that was about either, but because of Jack I didn't mind."

== Music ==
Shep is associated with the Windmill scene, the experimental and post-punk bands popular in South London in the late 2010s and early 2020s. He contributed footage to "Live at Bush Hall", a live film of the band Black Country, New Road. In 2025, Shep directed the music video for "Lecture 25", the first single from My New Band Believe, the new project of former Black Midi member Cameron Picton. On the band's self-titled debut album, Shep is credited with vocals on four tracks. Shep has also directed videos for artists including Sarah Meth and Blossom Caldarone. In 2026, Shep directed the music video for “Pin Up Boys”, the second single from the debut album of the band Westside Cowboy.
