= John L =

2021 single by Black Midi

Single by Black Midi

from the album Cavalcade
- B-side: "Despair"
- Released: 23 March 2021
- Genre: Progressive rock; avant-garde; math rock; art rock
- Length: 5:14
- Label: Rough Trade
- Songwriters: Geordie Greep, Cameron Picton, Morgan Simpson, Matt Kwasniewski-Kelvin
- Producer: Marta Salogni

Black Midi singles chronology
"Sweater" (2020)	"John L" (2021)	"Slow (Loud)" (2021)

Music video
- "John L" on YouTube

"John L" is a song by English rock band Black Midi, released in 2021 as the lead single from their second studio album, Cavalcade. The song describes the story of a powerful leader, the titular John L, who is eventually betrayed and killed by his followers. It was released on March 23, with the B-side Despair and a music video directed by Nina McNeely. A 12-inch release for the single was made available for pre-order on the same day and released on April 9. The song is one of few on Cavalcade to have writing credits for guitarist Matt Kwasniewski-Kelvin, written before his departure from the band but recorded after.

== Composition and recording ==
"John L" is an avant-garde progressive rock song described by Guitar World as "[featuring] dissonant piano chimes, weaving hypnotic vocals, a cacophony of string sounds, and an edge-of-the-seat dynamic range, spanning from complete silence to raucous, high-energy midsections." Mixdown Magazine similarly described the song as "featuring explosive drumming and anxious staccato strings." Violinist Jerskin Fendrix was brought on for the song, whose contributions Joyzine compared to Mahavishnu Orchestra.

Unlike the rest of the songs on Cavalcade, which were recorded with John "Spud" Murphy in Dublin, "John L" was recorded with Marta Salogni in London. Salogni would later go on to produce the band's third album, Hellfire. The song features the sound of a helicopter unintentionally captured by studio microphones as it flew overhead. The helicopter pilot is humorously credited among the rest of the band.

== Track listing ==
No.	Title	Length
1.	"John L"	5:14
2.	"Despair"	3:34

== Critical reception ==
"John L" was awarded Best New Track by Pitchfork. In the website's review for the song, Sam Sodomsky wrote "the triumph of 'John L' is not that these well-trained musicians continue to confound expectations: It's that they have become so adept at their brand of dissonant, skronking, avant-prog that it actually sounds sort of anthemic." In a review for Joyzine, Andrew Wood described the song as 'as good as anything they’ve so far released' but was disappointed by the vocals, saying "there’s no attempt at singing here, just a story recited, but in a strange American style [accent.]" Jeff Terich of Treblezine felt "it has an exhilarating feeling that all control is bound to be lost, which might well be the band’s greatest talent—reining in chaos just enough to feel like the chaos might ultimately win, but never quite gets there."

== Personnel ==
- Geordie Greep – vocals, Reverend Descent, Fret King Elise, acoustic piano, Minimoog Voyager
- Cameron Picton – Rickenbacker 4003
- Morgan Simpson – Ludwig Pro Beat Vistalite Kit
- Kaidi Akinnibi – tenor saxophone, soprano saxophone
- Jerskin Fendrix - violin
- Helicopter pilot - helicopter
