= Below the Waste (Goat Girl album) =

Below The Waste

Studio album by Goat Girl
- Released: 7 June 2024
- Length: 48:02
- Label: Rough Trade
- Producer: Goat Girl; John "Spud" Murphy

Goat Girl chronology
On All Fours (2021)	Below The Waste (2024)

Professional ratings
Aggregate scores
Source	Rating
AnyDecentMusic?	7.6/10
Metacritic	80/100
Review scores
Source	Rating
AllMusic	3.5/5 stars
Clash	7/10
DIY	5/5 stars
MusicOMH	3.5/5 stars
The Skinny (magazine)	4/5 stars
Far Out	4/5
Pitchfork	7.7/10

Below The Waste is the third studio album by English band Goat Girl. It was released on 7 June 2024 by Rough Trade Records.

== Production ==
The album was recorded primarily in Hellfire Studios in Ireland, with producer John 'Spud' Murphy (Lankum, Black Midi, Caroline). Additional sessions took place at Damon Albarn's Studio 13.

== Critical reception ==
Below the Waste was met with "universal acclaim" reviews from critics. At Metacritic, which assigns a weighted average rating out of 100 to reviews from mainstream publications, this release received an average score of 80 based on 10 reviews. AnyDecentMusic? gave the release a 7.6 out of 10 based on 12 reviews.

== Track listing ==
All tracks are written by Goat Girl.

Below The Waste track listing
No.	Title	Length
1.	"Reprise"	1:46
2.	"Ride Around"	4:09
3.	"Words Fell Out"	3:01
4.	"Play It Down"	3:40
5.	"TCNC"	3:01
6.	"Where's Ur <3"	3:32
7.	"Prelude"	0:23
8.	"Tonight"	2:54
9.	"Motorway"	3:21
10.	"S.M.O.G."	0:37
11.	"Take It Away"	2:30
12.	"Pretty Faces"	2:15
13.	"Perhaps"	4:33
14.	"Jump Sludge"	2:46
15.	"Sleep Talk"	3:17
16.	"Wasting"	6:10

== Personnel ==
Goat Girl

- Lottie Pendlebury – performance, production
- Rosy Jones – performance, production
- Holly Mullineaux – performance, production

Additional contributors

- John "Spud" Murphy – production, mixing
- Harvey Birrell – mastering
- Reuben Kyriakides – cello, prepared piano, accordion
- Alex McKenzie – bass clarinet, flute
- Nic Pendlebury – viola
- Josh Evans-Jesra – saxophone

== Charts ==
Chart performance for Below The Waste
Chart (2024)	Peak position
Scottish Albums (OCC)	27
UK Albums (OCC)	78
UK Independent Albums (OCC)	4
