= Stevie Martin =

British comedian (born 1988/1989)

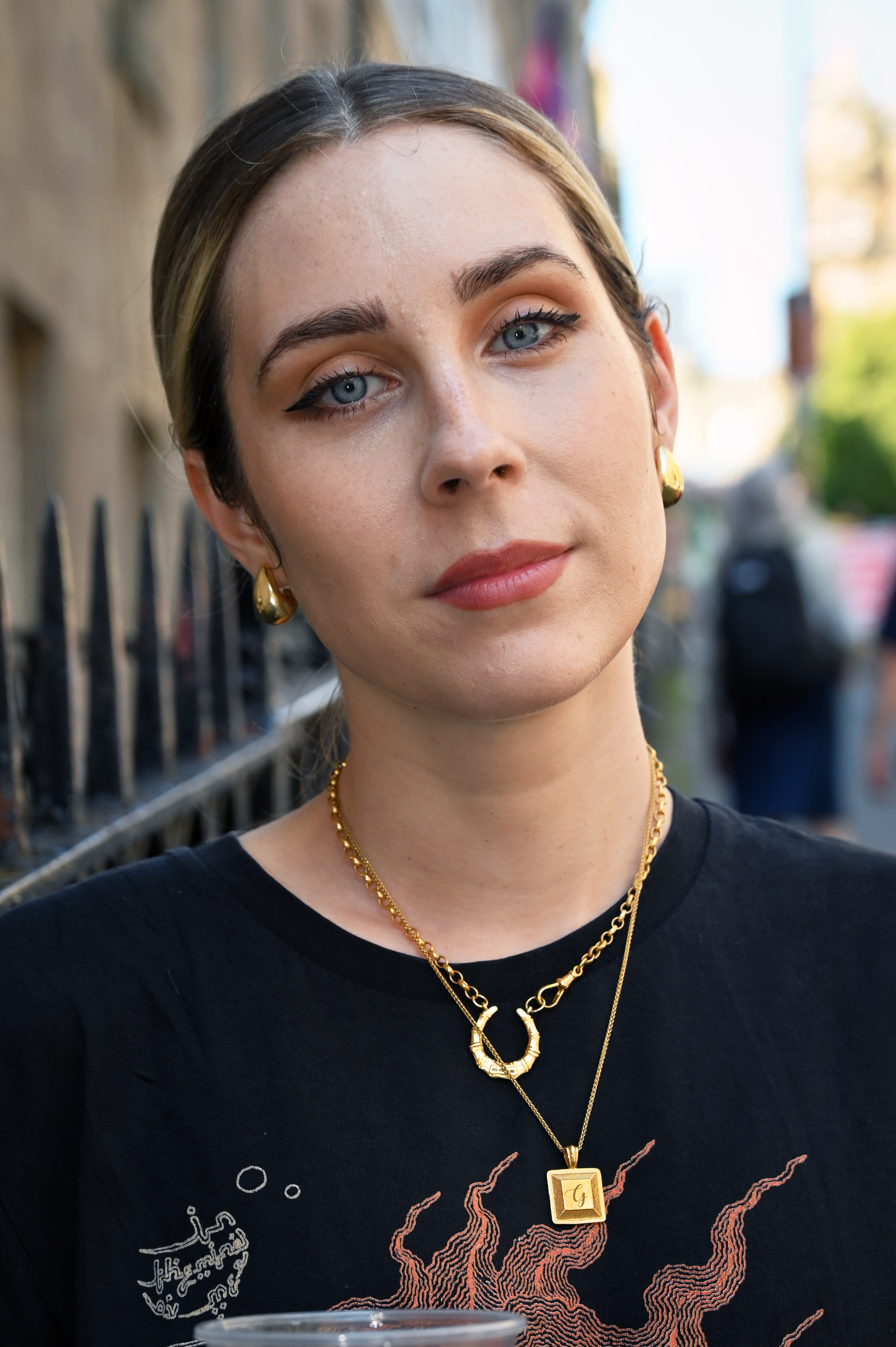
- Martin in 2025
- Born: Stevie Meredith Martin; May 12, 1988 (age 38)
- Education: St. John's College, Durham University
- Occupations: Actress, comedian (stand-up, sketch), writer
- Spouse: Adam Riches (m. 2022)
- Relatives: Gina Martin (sister)
- Website: steviemartin.com

Stevie Meredith Martin (born 1988) is a British comedian, actor and writer.

== Early life ==
Martin grew up in Northwich, Cheshire. She graduated from St. John's College, Durham University, in 2010, with a degree in English literature. She credits her career to having been auditioned for the Durham Revue sketch comedy group by Ed Gamble and Nish Kumar. Martin was in the group for two years during college. After graduating, she worked as a journalist.

== Career ==
Martin was a member of the sketch comedy group Massive Dad, along with the comedians Tessa Coates and Liz Kingsman. In 2018, Martin began doing solo work when the group shifted towards more writing and less live performance. She made her debut performance of Stevie Martin: Vol 1 at the Edinburgh Fringe.

That year, Martin began hosting the podcast The Debrief – later renamed Nobody Panic – with writer, performer, and fellow member of Massive Dad, Tessa Coates. Her first book, co-authored by Coates and published in 2021, is also called Nobody Panic: How to Be a Functioning Adult Without Screaming. The podcast went on hiatus in June 2024. Later in February 2026, Coates and Martin confirmed they were ending the podcast in a bonus finale episode.

In 2020, Martin began doing online sketches with actor Lola-Rose Maxwell. She rose to prominence as a result of the sketches' popularity.

Martin has appeared on television shows, including 8 Out of 10 Cats Does Countdown, Starstruck, Breeders, The Mash Report, Guessable, The Emily Atack Show, Taskmaster, and The Horne Section. She has written for television shows, including The Russell Howard Hour. She also writes a newsletter called The S Is a 5. With her sister, Gina Martin, she previously hosted the podcast Might Delete Later. She has appeared on podcasts, including RHLSTP.

In 2025, Martin was announced as a contestant in the 19th series of Taskmaster, alongside Fatiha El-Ghorri, Jason Mantzoukas, Mathew Baynton, and Rosie Ramsey. Martin also hosted the three-part miniseries Got the Shot alongside Lara Ricote, featuring the two traveling Great Britain in search of destinations to experience iconic movie genres. The series was produced by national tourism agency VisitBritain in hopes to increase tourism.

Martin appeared in the BBC One sitcom Here We Go in the episode "Dad's Red Cap". She also starred in the Channel 4 sketch series Mitchell and Webb Are Not Helping.

== Personal life ==
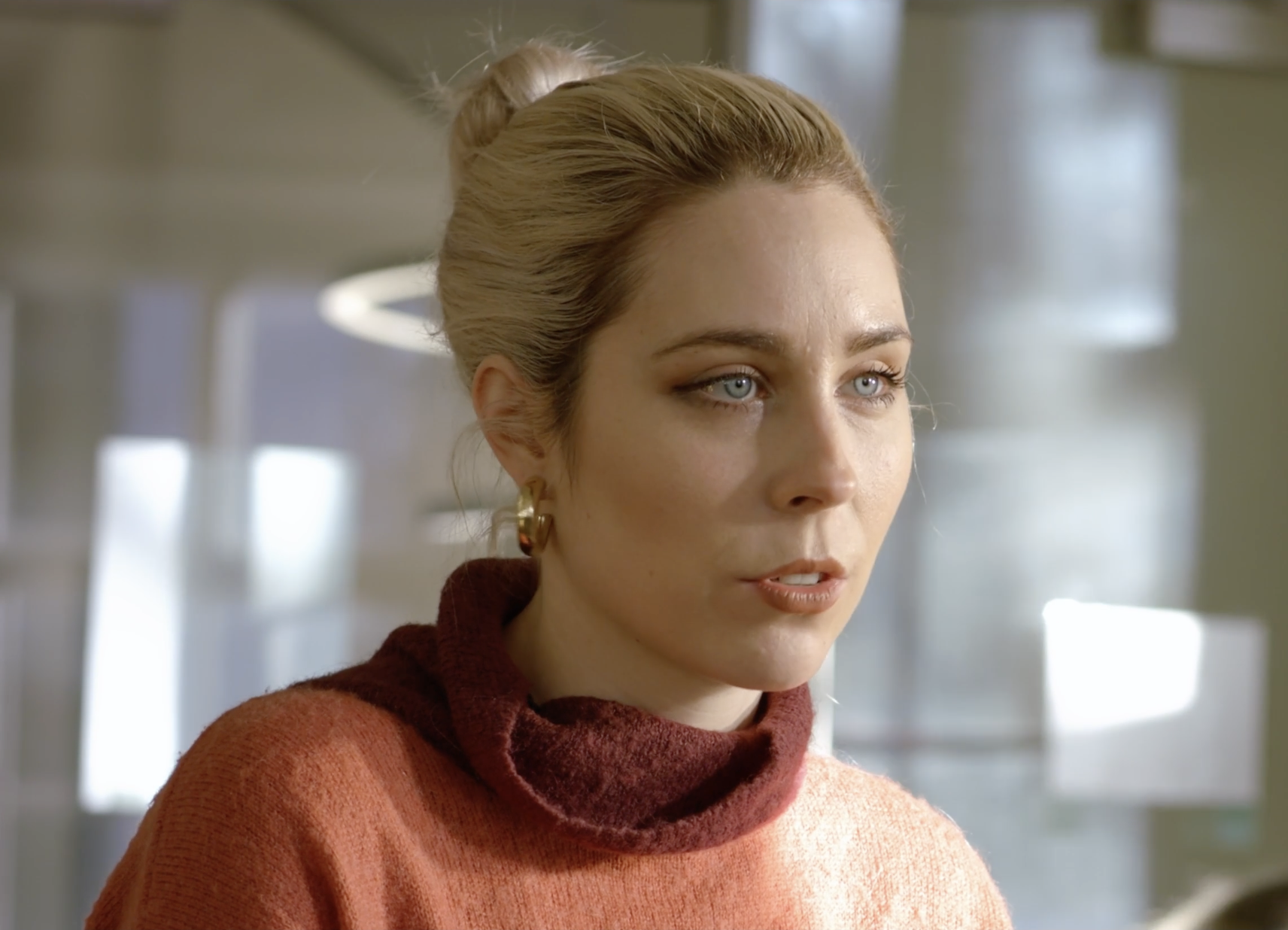
Martin in 2023

Martin is the older sister of political activist and author Gina Martin. She is married to Adam Riches, a fellow comedian.

Martin is vegan.

== Filmography ==
=== Film ===
Year	Title	Role	Notes
2014	Swag	Office Worker	Short film
2022	Reasons	Emily	Short film
2023	Two-Way Mirror	Emma	Short film

=== Television ===
Year	Title	Role	Notes
2015	Brotherhood	Ruth	Episode: "Poppy"
2018	Damned	Flo	Episode: "#2.3"
2019	Comedians Giving Lectures	Self	Series 1, Episode 6
2020	Breeders	Helen	Episode: "No Places"
2021	Starstruck	Stevie	Episode: "Autumn"
2021	Late Night Mash	Newsreader Jenny Baxter	4 episodes
2021	Step Up to the Plate (CBBC)	Self – Difficult Diner	Series 2, episode 3
2022	Rosie Molloy Gives Up Everything	Mel	Episode: "#1.1"
2025	The Horne Section TV Show	Penny Wittle	Episode: "The Haunting"
2025	Taskmaster	Self - Contestant	10 episodes
2025	Got the Shot	Self - Host	Mini-series
2025	Here We Go	Ruby	Episode: "Dad's Red Cap"
2025	Mitchell and Webb Are Not Helping	Various	
2025	Richard Osman's House of Games	Self - Contestant	Series 9, Week 8 - 5 Episodes

== Bibliography ==
- Coates, Tessa; Martin, Stevie (2021). Nobody Panic: How to Be a Functioning Adult Without Screaming. London: Hodder Studio. ISBN 978-1-5293-6440-8.
