= Piehouse Co-op =

Co-operative Music venue and arts space in Deptford, London

- Interactive map of Piehouse Co-op
- Former names: Matchstick Piehouse (2018–2023)
- Address: Railway Arches 213–214, Edward Place, SE8 5HD
- Location: Deptford, London Borough of Lewisham, England
- Coordinates: 51.4807118°N 0.031406°W
- Operator: Piehouse Workers Co-op C.I.C.
- Type: Music venue, community & arts space, piehouse and bar

Construction
- Opened: 2018
- Closed: November 2023
- Reopened: March 2025

Website
- piehouse.coop

Piehouse Co-op (or simply 'the Piehouse') is an music venue, arts and community space in the railway arches of Deptford, in the London Borough of Lewisham. It reopened as a worker co-operative in 2025, in succession to 'Matchstick Piehouse' (2018-2023).

== History ==
The Piehouse originally opened as 'Matchstick Piehouse' in 2018 in the railway arches of Deptford, as a 60-seat fringe theatre, arthouse and piehouse. It received support from the Theatres Trust to secure the space, negotiate the lease, and recycle seats from the Odeon cinema. In 2019, it also received funding from the London Small Theatres Grants Scheme to improve its soundproofing and auditorium flexibility.

While originally operating as a theatre, the Piehouse would then host a wide range of events, featuring music, comedy club, cabaret, drag and queer nights. It would host regular folk sessions, performances and jam nights from Steam Down band and collective, shows hosted by Goat Girl and Liv Wynter. Over the years, it featured prominent artists such as Ezra Collective, Nubya Garcia, Sons of Kemet, or Moses Boyd, as well as a jazz festival in 2021.

In November 2023, the venue suddenly shut its doors due to accumulated debt in rent arrears, while its landlord, the Arch Company, demanded £36,000 to be paid to avoid ending its lease. The Piehouse operators then launched a crowdfunding campaign with a series of events in other London venues.

Although the crowdfunding campaign didn't quite raise enough funds to prevent Matchistick Piehouse's closure, a group of people including some from the previous staff negotiated a 2025 reopening under a new CIC structure operating as a co-operative called Piehouse Workers Co-op. The Piehouse's reopening was also supported through a grant from Lewisham Council’s UK Shared Prosperity Fund to replace its furniture and equipment.
