= Slow (Black Midi song) =

"Slow (Loud)"

Single by Black Midi

from the album Cavalcade
- Released: 28 April 2021
- Genre: Jazz rock; post-punk
- Length: 5:36
- Label: Rough Trade
- Songwriters: Geordie Greep, Cameron Picton, Morgan Simpson
- Producers: Black Midi, John "Spud" Murphy

Black Midi singles chronology
"John L" (2021)	"Slow (Loud)" (2021)	"Chondromalacia Patella" (2021)

Music video
- "Slow" on YouTube

"Slow" is a song by English rock band Black Midi, released in 2021 as the second single from their second studio album, Cavalcade. The song's narrative is that of an idealistic revolutionary being shot after a coup d'etat.

The song was released as a single on 28 April 2021, with a different mix, under the name "Slow (Loud)" and a music video directed by Gustaf Holtenäs. The band would later partner with Holtenäs again on the music video for "Welcome to Hell." The single's cover art is a collage based on The Day Dream.

== Composition ==
Described by Guitar.com as "borne by a sludgy probing bassline and surging to cacophonous summits", "Slow" is one of two songs on Cavalcade sung by bassist Cameron Picton.

According to guitarist Geordie Greep, parts of the song are based on an octatonic scale often used by Olivier Messiaen and Igor Stravinsky.

== Critical reception ==
Pitchfork's review of Cavalcade stated that "Slow" was "among the best in the black midi catalog."

== Personnel ==
- Cameron Picton - Vocals, Rickenbacker 4003, Upright Bass, Fender Jazzmaster
- ]]Morgan Simpson]] - Maxwin Funky 405 Kit, Percussion (Bongos, Shaker, Tambourine), Tuned Kick, Roto-Toms
- Geordie Greep - Yamaha SA6O, Epiphone Masterbilt Nylon Guitar, Fender Mustang, Gibson SG, National Resophonic Guitar, Hammond Organ, Roland Jupiter 8
- Seth Evans - Bechstein Grand Piano
- Kaidi Akinnibi - Tenor Saxophone, Soprano Saxophone
- Joe Bristow - Trombone
