= Gina Martin =

English political activist and author

- Education: Leeds College of Art
- Occupation: Activist
- Years active: 2017–present
- Movement: Women's Rights; Criminalising of upskirting; Instagram Global Policy Change
- Family: Stevie Martin (sister); Adam Riches (brother-in-law)
- Awards: BBC's 100 Women; Stylist Remarkable Women Awards 2019; Cosmopolitan Magazine Disruptor Award; Preases Elit Award 2020; TIME's 100next Influential People; Evening Standards 1000 Most Influential People In London; Nominated for an OBE by Boris Johnson (rejected)
- Website: www.ginamartin.online

Gina Martin is an English women's rights activist, facilitator, author and speaker. She is known for her case to make upskirting illegal in England and Wales, which resulted in the Voyeurism (Offences) Act 2019, which influenced legislation in three other countries, as well as changing global Instagram policy with model Nyome Nicholas-Williams. Martin has also authored three books, Be the Change: A Toolkit for the Activist in You, No Offence...but and To Hate and Love Men and rejected a nomination for an award of an Order of the British Empire in 2020.

== Early life ==
Martin grew up in Northwich, Cheshire. She completed a year-long foundation course at Mid Cheshire College in 2010 before going on to graduate with a Bachelor of Arts (BA) in Creative Advertising from Leeds College of Art in 2013. Her older sister is stand-up comedian and actress Stevie Martin.

== Career and activism ==
In 2019, Martin and her lawyer Ryan Whelan (of Gibson Dunne and Crutcher L.L.P) were successful in reforming the Sexual Offences Act, 2003 by making upskirting an official sexual offence. France, Gibraltar and Northern Ireland followed suit inspired by the English and Welsh campaign.

In 2020, Martin worked pro-bono for model Nyome Nicholas-Williams to campaign against Instagram's nudity policy after the platform was accused of censorship for deleting images of Nicholas-Williams from the site while retaining similar images of white women, resulting in an official change to their nudity policy on breast squeezing. In August 2020 they won their campaign and Instagram apologised and amended the policy.

=== Upskirting campaign ===
In June 2017, Martin was attending the British Summer Time Festival in Hyde Park when she discovered that a man had taken a picture of her underwear from under her skirt. She took his phone to the police, who told her the act was not illegal and therefore they could not take any action. After posting about the incident on Facebook, her story went viral and an online petition was started to reopen her case. The petition received more than 100,000 signatures, and Martin began campaigning to change the law with pro-bono representation from associate lawyer Ryan Whelan of Gibson Dunn & Crutcher LLP. Martin campaigned while working a full-time job, and received a large amount of online harassment, including hundreds of rape threats and death threats.

In March 2018, along with Martin and Whelan, MP Wera Hobhouse tabled a Private Members Bill to make upskirting a criminal offence. The bill was blocked on second reading by Conservative MP Christopher Chope. In response, The Ministry of Justice backed the anti-upskirting campaign by introducing a Government bill that was eventually approved by the House of Lords in February 2019 and the Voyeurism (Offences) Act 2019 came into force in April the same year.

=== Writing ===
Martin has written for Grazia, The World Economic Forum, The Guardian, Glamour, and The Daily Telegraph, and Vogue and in June 2019 published a book on activism titled Be the Change: A Toolkit for the Activist in You. In 2022 Martin published No Offence... But with 10 other writers, advocates and activists, and in 2023 worked with independent publisher The Pound Project to release To Hate and Love Men a philosophical exploration of women's complex feelings towards men at large.

== Personal life ==
Martin married her Australian partner Jordy in February 2023. They live in Melbourne in the Australian state of Victoria.

== Bibliography ==
- Be The Change: A Toolkit for the Activist in You (2019)
- "No Offence, But…": How to have difficult conversations for meaningful change (2023)
- To Hate and Love Men (2024)

== Awards ==
In 2019, Martin was included in the BBC's 100 Women list, and the Time 100 Next list as well as Stylist Remarkable Women Gamechanger Award and Disruptor of the Year at the Cosmopolitan Magazine Influencer Awards.

Martin rejected an offer to be nominated for an Order of the British Empire in 2020, citing concerns about the "violence and oppression" of the British Empire.
