= Enterprice (British TV series) =

British television series

- Genre: Comedy drama
- Written by: Kayode Ewumi
- Starring: Kayode Ewumi; Trieve Blackwood-Cambridge; Thea Gajic; Roger Griffiths; Tanya Moodie; Kiell Smith-Bynoe
- No. of seasons: 2
- No. of episodes: 9

Original release
- Network: BBC Three
- Release: 29 November 2018

Enterprice is a British comedy-drama written by, and starring Kayode Ewumi. The show's co-stars are Trieve Blackwood-Cambridge, Thea Gajic, Roger Griffiths, and Tanya Moodie. Enterprice portrays two young entrepreneurs from South London: Kazim (Ewumi) and Jeremiah (Blackwood-Cambridge) as they try to escape the hustle and get their brand new delivery service business "Speedi-Kazz" off the ground.

BBC Three aired the Enterprice pilot in November 2017 with Daniel Ezra in the role of Jeremiah. In early 2018, shortly after the pilot aired, the BBC commissioned the first series, consisting of four episodes. In this first series, Blackwood-Cambridge replaced Ezra in the lead role of Jeremiah.

The first series of Enterprice premiered on BBC iPlayer on 29 November 2018 and was broadcast on BBC One on Friday nights during December 2018. In April 2019 Enterprice was renewed by BBC Three for a second series, which debuted on 8 March 2020.

Also in April 2019, Enterprice was nominated in the category of Favourite Comedy Production/Performer in the 2019 Screen Nation Film and Television Awards.

== Episodes ==
=== Series overview ===
Series	Episodes	Originally released	
Series	Episodes	First released	Last released
1	4	29 November 2018	28 May 2019
2	5	8 March 2020	

=== Series 1 (2018) ===
No. overall	No. in season	Title	Directed by	Written by	Original release date
1	1	"Hoops 'n' Dreams"	Nida Manzoor	Kayode Ewumi, Kiell Smith-Bynoe (additional material)	29 November 2018
Kazim and Jeremiah's fledgling business, Speedi-Kazz, has won the opportunity to pitch for twenty thousand pounds in front of some of London's most successful entrepreneurs, but there are plenty of distractions along the way - Kitty, the annoying ex-model turned vegan pop-up proprietor who has made it on daddy's money, a group of singers insisting Kazim buys a ticket to their show, and a couple of kids who just want to finish their game of basketball. Most worryingly, there are Jeremiah's parents, both of whom know nothing about Speedi-Kazz and think their son is about to go into his third year studying medicine at university.
2	2	"The People vs OJ"	Nida Manzoor	Kayode Ewumi, Kiell Smith-Bynoe (additional material)	29 November 2018
Kazim is excited to be attending a school reunion where he hopes to rekindle an old flame. Jerry has a date too, but Kazim is unhappy that this is with a client. The pair also have a meeting with their mentor, Fatima, the owner of a large goods exporting company. The boys are surprised by how decisively she deals with an employee who dares to cross her. Kaz goes to his school reunion, but it seems he was not as well-remembered as he had thought he would be. Jerry's date with Layla begins awkwardly and then takes a strange turn.
3	3	"Snakey Man"	Nida Manzoor	Kayode Ewumi, Kiell Smith-Bynoe (additional material)	29 November 2018
Kazim is excited to see the music video he recently made a cameo in. Jerry and Kazim's relationship has cooled. Jerry still doesn't know that Kaz has evidence of Jerry's big secret, it's only a matter of time before the truth comes out. Jerry's relationship with Layla intensifies. Kazim reminisces of a time when the future looked so bright. Sammy the Irish Traveller's family are out to bring him back to their fold, and Kazim is a vital piece of the puzzle to help them track him down.
4	4	"We Outchea"	Nida Manzoor	Kayode Ewumi, Kiell Smith-Bynoe (additional material)	29 November 2018
Jerry has returned to university as his parents want him to become a doctor, but he clearly misses Kaz and his relationship with Layla looks shaky. Kazim is looking for a new job, and gets back in touch with Kitty. However Jerry and Kaz get some unexpected news, and then see something they truly never expected. Kazim and Jeremiah attempt to reconcile their differences. The future starts to look brighter, but a figure from the past threatens to shake things up.

=== Series 2 (2020) ===
No. overall	No. in season	Title	Directed by	Written by	Original release date
5	1	"Drippin' In Sauce"	Unknown	Unknown	8 March 2020
6	2	"Crazy South"	Unknown	Unknown	8 March 2020
7	3	"When We Roar, Dem Run"	Unknown	Unknown	8 March 2020
8	4	"Surf on the Suffering"	Unknown	Unknown	8 March 2020
9	5	"The Mitchell Brothers"	Unknown	Unknown	8 March 2020
