= Mitchell and Webb Are Not Helping =

- Genre: Sketch comedy
- Created by: Mitchell and Webb
- Written by: Mitchell and Webb; Krystal Evans; Lara Ricote; Stevie Martin; Kiell Smith-Bynoe; Abigail Burdess; Sarah Campbell
- Directed by: David Sant
- Starring: David Mitchell; Robert Webb; Stevie Martin; Kiell Smith-Bynoe; Krystal Evans; Lara Ricote
- Music by: Dobs Vye
- Country of origin: United Kingdom
- Original language: English
- No. of series: 1
- No. of episodes: 6

Production
- Executive producers: Kenton Allen; David Mitchell; Robert Webb
- Producer: Gareth Edwards
- Editor: Mark Henson
- Running time: 22-26 minutes
- Production companies: Big Talk Studios; That Mitchell and Webb Company

Original release
- Network: Channel 4
- Release: 5 September 2025 – present

Mitchell and Webb Are Not Helping is a British sketch comedy show starring comedy duo Mitchell and Webb. Its first series, comprising six episodes, has been airing on Channel 4 since 5 September 2025. It was produced by That Mitchell & Webb Company with Big Talk Studios, and producer was Gareth Edwards. In December 2025, it was renewed for a second series.

== Cast ==
The main stars of the show were:

- David Mitchell
- Robert Webb
- Stevie Martin
- Kiell Smith-Bynoe
- Krystal Evans
- Lara Ricote

== Episodes ==
Series	Episodes	Originally released		
Series	Episodes	First released	Last released	Network
1	6	5 September 2025	10 October 2025	Channel 4

No.	Title	Directed by	Written by	VOD release date	Channel 4 broadcast	Viewers (millions)
1	"Episode One"	David Sant	Full ensemble, (Note: David Mitchell, Robert Webb, Kiell Smith-Bynoe, Lara Ricote, Stevie Martin, Krystal Evans) Abigail Burdess, Natasha Hodgson; Additional material: Mollie Goodfellow, Tatenda Shamiso	5 September 2025	5 September 2025	1.8
Sketches: Invention of the toilet, Airport Security, Sweary Aussie Drama, Canonite Suitcase advert, Writers' room (Canonite), Unhelpful Therapist, Prince Andrew docudramas, Pornstar Plumber, Writers' room (Plumber), Evil villain's death ray Also featuring: Charly Clive, Kath Hughes, Anna Morris.
2	"Episode Two"	David Sant	Full ensemble, Abigail Burdess, Sarah Campbell; Additional material: Priya Hall	5 September 2025	12 September 2025	N/A
Sketches: Radio interview, Hot Seat, Sweary Aussie Drama, Stab the Pirate game, Steamy detective drama, Horror movie trailer, Hot Seat's Little Stool, Writers' room (word clouds), Grave-digging, ABBA Also featuring: Olivia Colman, Ayoade Bamgboye, Helen Bauer, Lizzie Davidson, Jin Hao Li, Ed Jones, Emily Lloyd-Saini, Josh Pugh, Christian Ridley, Victoria Ridley, Dan Tiernan, Paddy Young.
3	"Episode Three"	David Sant	Full ensemble, Abigail Burdess; Additional material: Will Robbins	5 September 2025	19 September 2025	N/A
Sketches: Puritans, Sweary Aussie Drama, Deathlitas, Frustrated spy, Foley artist, Middle-Aged Man Island, Writers' room (appealing to young people), Branboozle, The Matrix stage adaptation Also featuring: Ed Jones, Esme Williams, Anya-Eniola Williams.
4	"Episode Four"	David Sant	Full ensemble, Abigail Burdess, Sarah Campbell, Jin Hao Li	5 September 2025	26 September 2025	N/A
Sketches: Disenchanted teacher, Sweary Aussie Drama, Writers' room (fire drill), Ominous Budget speech, EM Forster (writing circle), EM Forster (delivery driver), Woman seeks daddy, Middle-Aged Man Island, Theatre actor's final words, EM Forster (sauna) Also featuring: Rory Bremner, Charly Clive, Ed Jones.
5	"Episode Five"	David Sant	Full ensemble, Abigail Burdess, Harry Enfield, Ed Jones	5 September 2025	10 October 2025 (Note: For unstated reasons, the linear broadcasts of episode five and six were swapped.)	N/A
Sketches: The Weeping Shed, Writers' room (lawyer censorship), "Passing away" pub chat, Sweary Aussie Drama, Wanking causes climate change, 'Woke' trainers, Police interview, Middle-Aged Man Island, Writers' room ('long chalk') Also featuring: Gareth Edwards.
6	"Episode Six"	David Sant	Full ensemble, Abigail Burdess, Simon Kane, Paddy Young; Additional material: Beth Granville, Sarah Mills, Josh Pugh	5 September 2025	3 October 2025	N/A
Sketches: Documentary about hotels, Writers' room (golf), The Weeping Shed, school DBS check, author talks through his agent, Middle-Aged Man Island, unconventional coming out, aliens share a sitcom idea Also featuring: Lizzie Davidson, Jin Hao Li, Ed Jones.
