= Break Clause =

British television series

- Genre: Romantic comedy
- Created by: Jess Bray
- Written by: Jess Bray
- Directed by: Alice Snedden
- Starring: Samuel Bottomley; Lara Ricote; John Thomson
- Countries of origin: United Kingdom; Germany
- Original language: English
- No. of series: 1
- No. of episodes: 6

Production
- Executive producers: Jess Bray; Mark Freeland; Molly Seymour; Josh Cole; Laura Mae Harding
- Producer: Olly Cambridge
- Running time: 23 minutes
- Production companies: ZDF; BBC Studios

Original release
- Network: Channel 4
- Release: 1 October 2026 – present

Break Clause is a British romantic comedy series created by Jess Bray and starring Samuel Bottomley and Lara Ricote. It was broadcast on Channel 4 from 1 October 2026.

== Premise ==
A young couple split-up but are locked into a tenancy agreement and must continue to live as flatmates.

== Cast ==
- Samuel Bottomley as Ben
- Lara Ricote as Lil
- John Thomson as Alan
- Lucy Black as Deb
- Catherine Cohen as Jos
- Charly Clive as Frances
- Hammed Animashaun as Paul
- Michael Workéyè as Kas
- Jessica Knappett as the Vicar
- Nathan Foad as Owen
- Assa Kanouté as Kira
- Jack Shep as Liam
- Tamika Bennett as Nic
- Jack James Ryan as Jordan
- Lucas Jones as Sean
- Aydin Ahmed as Brandon

== Production ==
The series is created by Jess Bray and directed by Alice Snedden with Will Hanke as director of photography. Both writer and director were influenced by romantic comedy films of the 1980s and 1990s.

It is produced by BBC Studios Comedy and in a co-production with German company ZDFneo. Executive producers are Jess Bray, Mark Freeland, Molly Seymour, Josh Cole and Laura Mae Harding. Olly Cambridge is series producer. The series was formed out of a 2024 pilot through the Channel 4 Comedy Blaps showcase, and was commissioned in August 2025, with many of the cast returning for the series, including lead pairing Samuel Bottomley and Lara Ricote. The series was filmed in Manchester. The exterior and most of the interior scenes at the flat were filmed in Ashton-Under-Lyne which is just outside of Manchester City Centre, with filming taking place in October 2025.

The series cast includes John Thomson, Charly Clive, Hammed Animashaun, Michael Workéyè, Jack Shep and Jessica Knappett.

== Broadcast ==
The series was broadcast on Channel 4 from 1 October 2026.

== Reception ==
The Guardian felt that Thomson was underused but praised the performance of Ricote and described the series as "funny" with a "verve to the dialogue and direction" which "mines territory other shows ignore". Benji Wilson in The Daily Telegraph gave the show four stars and praised Bray as well as Bottomley and Ricote for a "central romance between Lil and Ben is entirely credible", and describing the series as "very funny throughout".
