= Derevaun Seraun =

Studio album by Kiran Leonard
- Released: 15 September 2017
- Length: 31:23
- Label: Moshi Moshi

Kiran Leonard chronology
Grapefruit (2016)	Derevaun Seraun (2017)

Professional ratings
Review scores
Source	Rating
AllMusic	3/5 stars

Derevaun Seraun is a studio album by English musician Kiran Leonard. It was released in September 2017 under Moshi Moshi Records.

The album was released to celebrate the re-opening of Manchester Central Library, and was inspired by poets such as James Joyce, Albert Camus, Clarice Lispector, Henry Miller and Manuel Bandeira

== Track listing ==
No.	Title	Length
1.	"Could She Still Draw Back?"	4:24
2.	"Living With Your Ailments"	7:36
3.	"A Particle of Flesh Refuse the Consummation of Death"	8:00
4.	"The Mute Wide-Open Eye of All Things"	2:22
5.	"The Cure for Pneumothorax"	9:01

== Accolades ==
Publication	Accolade	Rank	Ref.
NME	Top 50 Albums of 2017	47	
