= On All Fours =

Studio album by Goat Girl
- Released: 29 January 2021
- Recorded: 2020
- Length: 54:36
- Label: Rough Trade
- Producer: Dan Carey

Goat Girl chronology
Goat Girl (2018)	On All Fours (2021)	Below the Waste (2024)

Professional ratings
Aggregate scores
Source	Rating
AnyDecentMusic?	7.7/10
Metacritic	81/100
Review scores
Source	Rating
AllMusic	4/5 stars
Clash	8/10
DIY	5/5 stars
MusicOMH	3.5/5 stars
NME	4/5 stars
Paste	8/10
Pitchfork	7.1/10

On All Fours is the second studio album by English band Goat Girl. It was released on 29 January 2021 by Rough Trade Records.

== Production ==
The album was recorded in early 2020 in South London with producer Dan Carey.

== Release ==
On 29 September 2020, Goat Girl announced the release of their second studio album, alongside the first single "Sad Cowboy". The official music video was released on YouTube the same day. Band member Lottie Cream said in a statement of the single: "Sad Cowboy centres around the idea of losing a grip on reality and how often this can happen. When you’re within a world that constantly makes you feel as though your living out a really bad dream, disillusionment is inevitable."

The second single "The Crack" was released on 1 December 2020.

The third single "Badibaba" was released on 19 January 2021. L.E.D., the band's guitarist, said of the single: "Badibaba is a song about environmental catastrophe and the pessimism and self-destruction that this causes to the human spirit. It touches on how the Earth’s existence is controlled by exploitative systems, and the feeling of existential helplessness this induces."

== Tour ==
A tour of the UK in support of the album is scheduled to take place in September 2021. The band then announced a European tour, starting in Brussels and finishing in Luxembourg, was announced on their Instagram for February 2022.

== Critical reception ==
On All Fours was met with "universal acclaim" reviews from critics. At Metacritic, which assigns a weighted average rating out of 100 to reviews from mainstream publications, this release received an average score of 81 based on 14 reviews. AnyDecentMusic? gave the release a 7.7 out of 10 based on 25 reviews.

Writing for AllMusic, Heather Phares wrote: "While Goat Girl frequently take a more abstract songwriting approach on On All Fours, their subjects are as pointed as always. Both nervier and more confident than their debut, On All Fours is a huge step forward from a band that's well-equipped to bring post-punk's legacy into the future." Marianne Gallagher of Clash said: "Produced by Dan Care, it's a little less spiky round the edges than the eponymous debut – a statement equally strident, but considered in its stances and elegant in its rage. They toy with a bunch of styles and broader instrumentation, even sprinkling disco on its poppier edges." Lisa Wright of DIY gave praise to the release, showing a five out of five stars, noting "the band have audibly blossomed as songwriters, whilst keeping the integral sense of the unexpected at their core."

In a review for NME, El Hunt stated: "On All Fours Goat Girl builds on this knack for addressing bigger issues with smaller everyday stories – and draws from an increasingly electronic pool of musical influences. As they move away from grinding, relentless guitars, the intensity hits differently here – instead of whacking you around the chops in a squall of distortion, it creeps up by spinning an intricate careful web instead." Clare Martin of Paste said: "Goat Girl's 19 tracks varied in length from 40 seconds to just under four minutes. On All Fours finds them more confident, giving themselves more room to breathe on tracks but never wasting a second. The frenetic energy that made their debut so memorable is still here and Goat Girl control it with unparalleled skill, always keeping you wanting more." The album was placed at number 38 in The Guardian's list of the 50 best albums of 2021.

== Track listing ==
On All Fours track listing
No.	Title	Length
1.	"Pest"	4:02
2.	"Badibaba"	4:11
3.	"Jazz (In the Supermarket)"	4:35
4.	"Once Again"	4:17
5.	"P.T.S. Tea"	3:44
6.	"Sad Cowboy"	5:17
7.	"The Crack"	3:13
8.	"Closing In"	3:36
9.	"Anxiety Feels"	3:40
10.	"They Bite on You"	3:45
11.	"Bang"	4:28
12.	"Where Do We Go From Here?"	4:15
13.	"A-Men"	5:34

== Charts ==
Chart performance for On All Fours
Chart (2021)	Peak position
Scottish Albums (Official Charts)	11
Swiss Albums (Schweizer Hitparade)	83
UK Albums (Official Charts)	30
UK Independent Albums (Official Charts)	2
