= Voyeurism (Offences) Act 2019 =

British law criminalised upskirting

Voyeurism (Offences) Act 2019 (Note: Section 2(3).)
- Act of Parliament
- Parliament of the United Kingdom
- Long title: An Act to make certain acts of voyeurism an offence, and for connected purposes.
- Citation: 2019 c. 2
- Introduced by: David Gauke (Commons); Richard Keen, Baron Keen of Elie (Lords)
- Territorial extent: England and Wales (Note: Section 2(1).)

Dates
- Royal assent: 12 February 2019
- Commencement: 12 April 2019 (Note: Section 2(2).)
Other legislation
Amends	Children and Young Persons Act 1933; Sexual Offences Act 2003; Criminal Justice Act 2003; Modern Slavery Act 2015

Status: Amended

History of passage through Parliament

Text of statute as originally enacted

Text of the Voyeurism (Offences) Act 2019 as in force today (including any amendments) within the United Kingdom, from legislation.gov.uk.

The Voyeurism (Offences) Act 2019 (c. 2) is an act of the Parliament of the United Kingdom which amends the Sexual Offences Act 2003 to make upskirting a specific offence of voyeurism. The act came into force on 12 April 2019.

== Provisions ==
For the purposes of the act, the relevant offence is committed by creating images of, or operating equipment to view, genitals, buttocks or underwear beneath clothing where they would not normally be visible, for the purpose of sexual gratification or to cause humiliation, alarm or distress. The maximum sentence for the offence is two years' imprisonment and in the more serious sexual cases those convicted are added to the Violent and Sex Offender Register.

== Background ==
Before 2019, there was no specific law against upskirting in England and Wales. When upskirting took place in public, it was outside the scope of the offence of voyeurism under the Sexual Offences Act 2003. Nevertheless, prosecutions for upskirting were occasionally brought alleging the common law offence of outraging public decency, which requires the presence of at least two other people and for the act to be done in a public place.

In August 2017, Gina Martin, who was upskirted at a music festival, began a campaign to reopen her case after the police closed it; Martin's case ignited a public debate over the legality of upskirting in England and Wales. The opposition Labour Party backed her petition, which attracted over 58,000 signatures, to make the practice of upskirting illegal under the Sexual Offences Act. A freedom of information request revealed that between 2015 and 2017 there were 11 charges related to upskirting in England and Wales, but that only 15 out of 44 police forces held specific relevant records.

The campaign to make upskirting a specific crime in England and Wales was supported by Conservative Member of Parliament (MP) Maria Miller, Chair of the Women and Equalities Committee; the End Violence Against Women Coalition; Sadiq Khan, the Mayor of London; and by others.

== Private member's bill ==
On 6 March 2018, Liberal Democrat MP Wera Hobhouse presented a private member's bill to the House of Commons in support of Martin's national campaign. Justice Secretary David Gauke signalled that the government would support Hobhouse's bill, which was later supported by the Prime Minister, Theresa May. The bill was not debated at its presentation.

At its second reading in the Commons on 15 June 2018, Conservative MP Christopher Chope objected to Hobhouse's bill, preventing its passage through the Commons. Chope said that his reason for blocking the bill's passage was in objection to parliamentary procedure rather than to the bill itself: he stated that he would "wholeheartedly" support a government bill that outlawed upskirting. Chope's actions drew immediate criticism from fellow MPs, including some in his own party. May also expressed her disappointment at the objection. In protest at his actions, staff at the House of Commons placed a bunting of women's underwear outside Chope's office entrance. A similar bunting was also placed outside his constituency office. Protestors also confronted Chope at his constituency surgery.

Clare McGlynn, a law professor at Durham University, said that by being returned to the House of Commons for debate, Hobhouse's bill could now be amended and "future-proofed" to include penalties for creators of deepfake pornographic images. McGlynn said that the bill as drafted had "placed too high a burden of proof on prosecutors because they had to show that a picture was taken for the purposes of sexual gratification or to cause distress" when "the unfortunate reality is that these things are often done 'for a laugh'. It's not clear to me that the current proposed legislation will cover these situations." The bill which ultimately passed applies to upskirting for the purposes of "humiliating, alarming or distressing" the victim, but does not contain any provisions against deepfakes.

== Government bill ==
Following Chope's objection, the government reaffirmed its commitment to introduce legislation to outlaw upskirting. A government bill was introduced to the House of Commons on 21 June 2018. Speaking on the government's behalf in the House of Lords, Baroness Vere of Norbiton said that the legislation would also protect men wearing kilts.

The Voyeurism (Offences) Act 2019 received royal assent on 12 February 2019, taking effect two months later on 12 April.
