= Grapefruit (Kiran Leonard album) =

Studio album by Kiran Leonard
- Released: 25 March 2016
- Length: 56:51
- Label: Moshi Moshi

Kiran Leonard chronology
Bowler Hat Soup (2013)	Grapefruit (2016)	Derevaun Seraun (2017)

Professional ratings
Aggregate scores
Source	Rating
AnyDecentMusic?	7.1/10
Metacritic	71/100
Review scores
Source	Rating
MusicOMH	4/5 stars
The Line of Best Fit	9/10

Grapefruit is the second studio album by English musician Kiran Leonard. It was released in March 2016 under Moshi Moshi Records.

== Track listing ==
No.	Title	Length
1.	"Secret Police"	2:32
2.	"Pink Fruit"	16:15
3.	"Öndör Gongor"	7:37
4.	"Caiaphas in Fetters"	4:19
5.	"Don't Make Friends with Good People"	9:22
6.	"Exeter Services"	3:59
7.	"Half-Ruined Already"	2:31
8.	"Fireplace"	10:16

== Accolades ==
Publication	Accolade	Rank	Ref.
Uncut	Top 75 Albums of 2016	70	
