= Goat Girl (album) =

Studio album by Goat Girl
- Released: 6 April 2018
- Genre: Post-punk
- Length: 40:04
- Label: Rough Trade
- Producer: Dan Carey

Goat Girl chronology
Goat Girl (2018)	On All Fours (2021)

Professional ratings
Aggregate scores
Source	Rating
Metacritic	80/100
Review scores
Source	Rating
AllMusic	3.5/5 stars
Clash	8/10
DIY	5/5 stars
Dork	5/5 stars
Drowned in Sound	8/10
Exclaim!	5/10
The Line of Best Fit	8/10
MusicOMH	3/5 stars
NME	4/5 stars
Pitchfork	7.5/10

Goat Girl is the debut eponymous studio album by English post-punk band Goat Girl. It was released on 6 April 2018, by Rough Trade Records.

The album charted at number 24 on the UK Official Albums Chart, and number 44 in Scotland.

== Release ==
The first track to be released from the album, "Country Sleaze", was released on 20 September 2016.

On 30 October 2017, Goat Girl announced the release of their second single "Cracker Drool". The single was produced by Dan Carey at his South London studio, while the music video was directed by CC Wade in Sussex, England.

On 6 February 2018, the band announced the release of their debut album, along with the single "The Man". The band said of the album:

"Simply put, it’s an album that comes from growing up in London and the first-hand experience of our city’s devolution. We wanted to think of it as this place seen not necessarily just through our eyes, but someone who can’t get past the abnormalities and strange happenings that exist in our city. We think this gives the freedom lyrically and musically to explore unspoken truths and emotions that we all as humans feel."

== Critical reception ==
Goat Girl was met with "generally favorable" reviews from critics. At Metacritic, which assigns a weighted average rating out of 100 to reviews from mainstream publications, this release received an average score of 80 based on 17 reviews. Aggregator Album of the Year gave the release a 78 out of 100 based on a critical consensus of 18 reviews.

Josh Gray from Clash said the album has "earworm guitar licks and choir-like harmonies sprout unexpectedly from Goat Girl’s skeletal, unpredictable songs like wildflowers in landfill. Detuned ragtime pianos sound through intervals like the echoes of a haunted carnival while disembodied voices tell ghoulish tales of a semi-mythical London that exists beneath the cobblestones, caked in dirt and disease and decay." Lisa Wright from DIY said the album is "ambitious and uncompromising, in both structure and content; rather than spoonfeeding, Goat Girl demand more from their listeners and provide more in tandem. As an opening statement, this is as gutsy and self-assured as they come." Cal Cashin from Dork gave high praise to the band for the songwriting and catchy melodies within the album, explaining "The ease at which a whole other world is created, and the amount of catchy and effortlessly cool melodies on the way, ensure that Goat Girl’s debut is not only accomplished, but special.

=== Accolades ===
Accolades for Goat Girl
Publication	Accolade	Rank
Fopp	Fopp's Top 100 Albums of 2018	28
The Guardian	The Guardian's Top 50 Albums of 2018	50
Louder Than War	Louder Than War's Top 25 Albums of 2018	9
MusicOMH	MusicOMH's Top 50 Albums of 2018	30
NME	NME's Top 100 Albums of 2018	82
No Ripcord	No Ripcord's Top 50 Albums of 2018	37
The Quietus	The Quietus' Top 100 Albums of 2018	53
Under the Radar	Under the Radar's Top 100 Albums of 2018	95

== Track listing ==
Goat Girl track listing
No.	Title	Length
1.	"Salty Sounds"	1:07
2.	"Burn the Stake"	2:40
3.	"Creep"	2:21
4.	"Viper Fish"	3:50
5.	"A Swamp Dog's Tale"	1:21
6.	"Cracker Drool"	2:38
7.	"Slowly Reclines"	2:30
8.	"The Man With No Heart or Brain"	1:32
9.	"Moonlit Monkey"	0:40
10.	"The Man"	3:10
11.	"Lay Down"	2:50
12.	"I Don't Care, Pt. 1"	2:08
13.	"Hank's Theme"	0:47
14.	"I Don't Care, Pt. 2"	2:51
15.	"Throw Me a Bone"	2:27
16.	"Dance of Dirty Leftovers"	0:46
17.	"Little Liar"	1:44
18.	"Country Sleaze"	1:48
19.	"Tomorrow"	2:54

Japanese Bonus Edition
No.	Title	Length
20.	"Scream"
21.	"Topless Tit"
22.	"Banana (Instrumental)"

== Personnel ==
Musicians

- Rosy Bones – drums
- Ellie Rose Davies – guitar, vocals
- Clottie Cream – guitar, vocals
- Naima Jelly – bass, backing vocals
- Tina Longford – violin

Production

- Dan Carey – producer
- Christian Wright – mastering
- Alexis Smith – mixing

== Charts ==
Chart performance for Goat Girl
Chart (2018)	Peak position
Scottish Albums (Official Charts)	44
UK Albums (Official Charts)	24
UK Independent Albums (Official Charts)	7
