= My New Band Believe =

English rock band

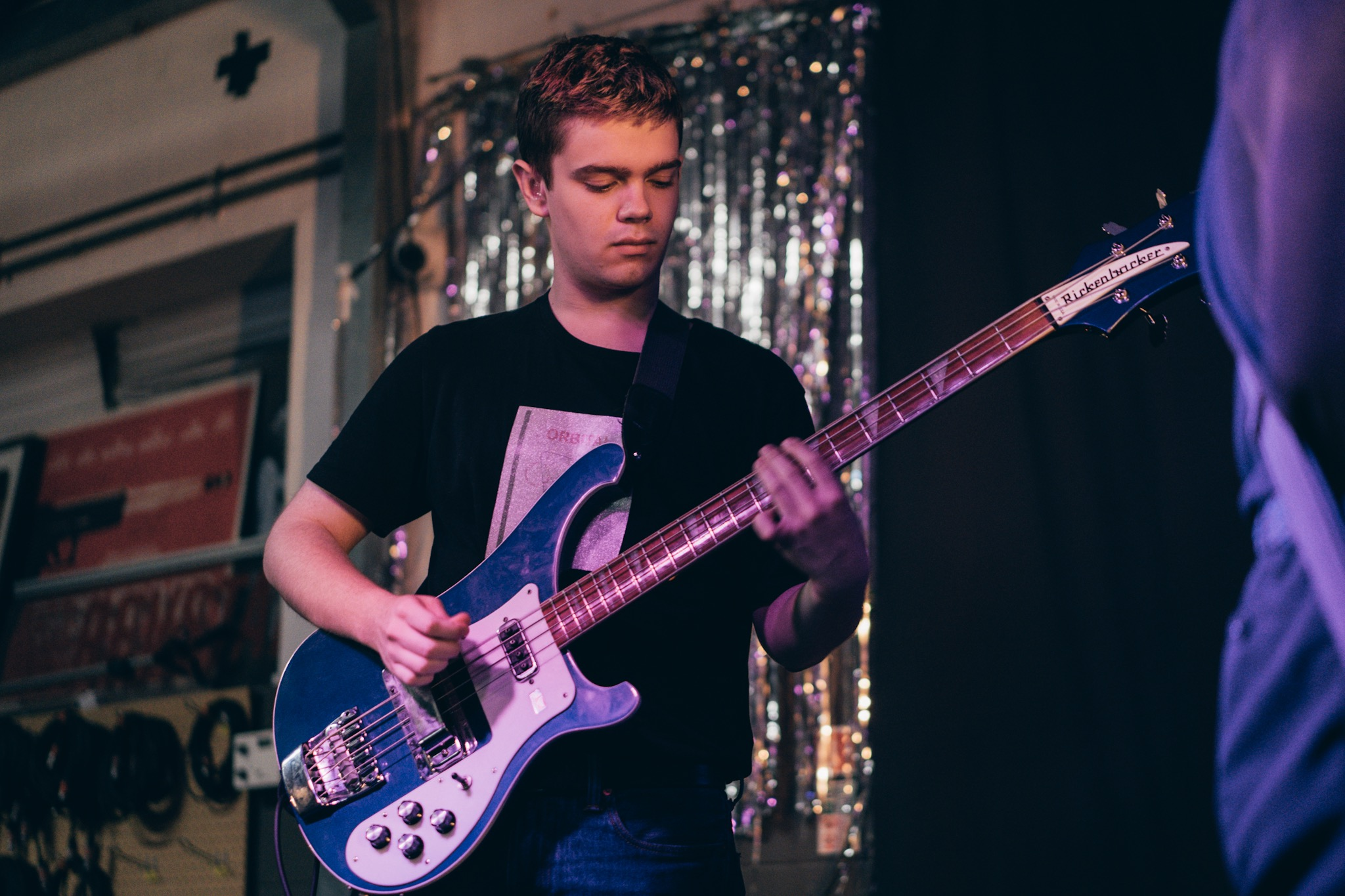
- Picton performing with Black Midi in 2019

Background information
- Origin: London, England
- Genres: Experimental rock; art rock
- Years active: 2025–present
- Label: Rough Trade
- Spinoff of: Black Midi
- Members: Cameron Picton
- Website: mynewbandbelieve.com

My New Band Believe is an English rock band formed in 2025 by former Black Midi bassist and vocalist Cameron Picton, following the band's 2024 hiatus. The band features Picton on lead vocals and guitar, as well as a rotating lineup of musicians on drums, bass, guitar, keyboards, and saxophone.

Before forming My New Band Believe, Picton released multiple mixtapes consisting of song demos and live recordings, in order to take the pressure off of releasing music. Picton also used these mixtapes, published under the name "Camera Picture," to gauge interest for future work, including the album My New Band Believe.

The band's debut single, "Lecture 25", was released on 14 February 2025 alongside a music video made by Jack Shep. The band announced their debut studio album, My New Band Believe, would be released on 10 April 2026, with the non-album single "Numerology" released as part of its promotion. The single received positive reviews from critics and was noted for its heavy departure from the heavier sound of Black Midi, featuring a mostly acoustic sound with elements of free jazz, sophisti-pop, disco, and tropicália. Picton himself has stated the album is "almost entirely acoustic."

Their debut eponymous album released on 10 April 2026 to critical acclaim.

The band embarked on two major tours following the album's release, one in the UK between 28 April and 6 May 2026 and one in North America between 29 May and 7 June 2026.

== Discography ==
=== Studio albums ===
Title	Album details
My New Band Believe	Released: 10 April 2026; Label: Rough Trade; Format: CD, LP, download

=== Singles ===
Title	Year	Album
"Lecture 25"	2025	Non-album single
"Numerology"	2026	Non-album single
"Love Story"	2026	My New Band Believe
