= Bacio di Tosca =

- Origin: Germany
- Genres: Neoclassical, dark wave
- Years active: current
- Labels: Caput Medusae Records
- Members: Dörthe Flemming various guest musicians
- Website: www.bacio-di-tosca.de

Bacio di Tosca is a German neoclassical musical project by mezzo-sopranist Dörthe Flemming that combines influences from classical music, mainly the German Lied, with modern electronic Dark wave. The name (Italian: Bacio di Tosca, lit. 'Kiss of Tosca') refers to a murder scene in Giacomo Puccini's opera Tosca.

The dark romantic music of Bacio di Tosca with lyrics by poets like Eduard Mörike, Heinrich Heine or Theodor Storm is distinct by Flemming's classical vocals. As former singer of the now defunct band Charitona, Dörthe Flemming is counted among the founders of the Heavenly Voices genre.

== Discography ==
=== Albums ===
- Der Tod und das Mädchen (2007). Reviewers had divided opinions on this album. While Side-Line noted a lack of refinement between voice and music, a German source mentioned a skilled interpretation of the original songs and compared Bacio di Tosca to Dead Can Dance and Sopor Aeternus.
- Und wenn das Herz auch bricht! (2008). It contains "gothic music mixed with refined neo-classical elements", including two remixes by Bruno Kramm of Das Ich.
- Hälfte des Lebens (2010)
- Was ich liebe (2014)
