= Lara Ricote =

Mexican-American comedian and actor

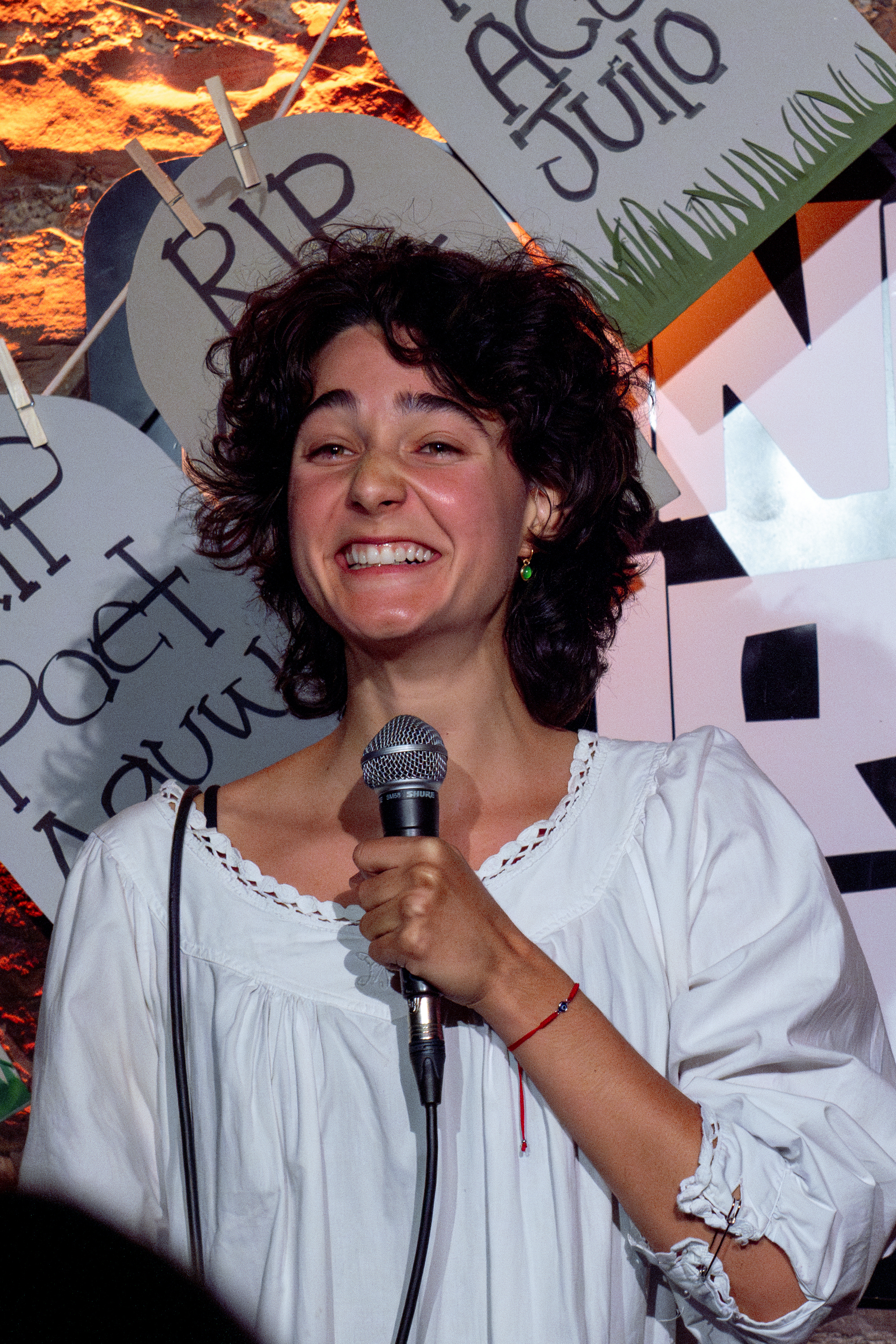
- Ricote at the 2024 Edinburgh Festival Fringe in Edinburgh, Scotland.
- Born: December 31, 1996 (age 29)
- Education: University of Amsterdam
- Occupation: Comedian
- Years active: 2018–present
- Mother: Gabriela Rivero
- Awards: Funny Women Stage Award; Edinburgh Comedy Award for Best Newcomer
- Website: lararicote.com

Lara Ricote is a Mexican-American comedian and actress based in London, UK.

== Early life ==
Ricote is the daughter of actor Gabriela Rivero and photographer Luis Francisco Ricote. She grew up in Miami before moving to the Netherlands to study politics at the University of Amsterdam.

== Career ==
Ricote began performing improv and stand-up comedy while studying in Amsterdam. She has performed in both English and Spanish.

In 2021, Ricote won the Funny Women Stage Award. At the 2022 Edinburgh Festival Fringe, she performed her debut solo show GRL/LATNX/DEF and won the Edinburgh Comedy Award for Best Newcomer.

In May 2022, Ricote featured in Rosie Jones's Disability Comedy Extravaganza, a comedy special broadcast on Dave. In October the same year, she appeared on the panel shows Mel Giedroyc: Unforgivable and Question Team, both also broadcast on Dave.

In February 2024, Ricote appeared on season U of BBC Two's QI as a guest panelist. She appeared again the following year, on season V.

In January 2025, she appeared on five daily episodes of Richard Osman's House of Games (series 8, week 12) alongside former Blue Peter presenter Helen Skelton, and comedians Ben Bailey Smith (aka Doc Brown) and Robin Ince.

In September 2025, Ricote appeared in sketch comedy series Mitchell and Webb Are Not Helping.

In February 2026, it was announced that Ricote would star alongside Samuel Bottomley in the romantic comedy series Break Clause which broadcast on Channel 4 in October 2026.

In May 2026, Ricote appeared as Jess in Sam Campbell's Make That Movie.

Ricote’s show Inkling was nominated for the Edinburgh Comedy Award for Best Show in 2026.

== Personal life ==
Ricote lives in London, having previously lived in Amsterdam. She has degenerative hearing loss and uses hearing aids; she has described herself as hard of hearing. Her sister is Maya Ricote, a clown who was nominated for the 2026 Sketch Off! award.
