= Naima Bock =

English musician

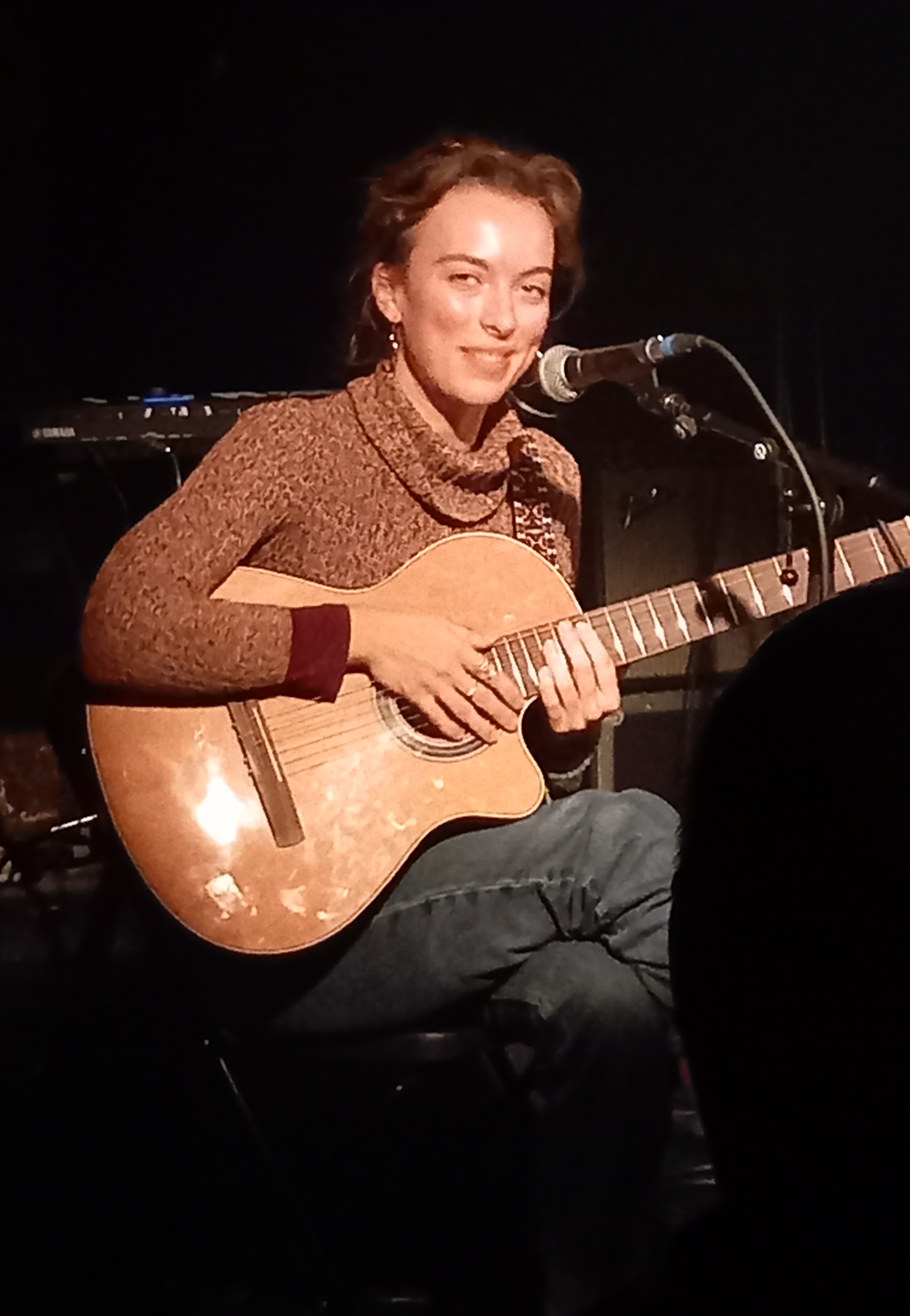
- Bock performing in Paris, February 2024

Background information
- Label: Sub Pop
- Formerly of: Goat Girl
- Website: www.naimabock.com

Naima Bock is an English musician, previously a member of the band Goat Girl. She is currently in the Bristol-based power pop band The Cindys.

== Early life ==
Bock was born in Glastonbury to a Brazilian father and a Greek mother. She grew up just outside Shepton Mallet in England and São Paulo.

== Career ==
Bock was originally the bassist for British indie-rock band Goat Girl, performing under the name Naima Jelly.

After departing Goat Girl, Bock signed with Sub Pop and released her debut single, "30 Degrees". Bock's second release was a cover of the Brazilian song "Berimbau". In early 2022, Bock released a new song titled "Every Morning". In April 2022, Bock announced her debut album, Giant Palm. The album received positive reviews and was named Stereogum's "Album of the Week".

In February 2023, Bock released a new song called "Lines".

Bock's second album, Below a Massive Dark Land, came out on Sub Pop in September 2024. It was preceded by singles "Gentle" and "Feed My Release".

== Discography ==
Studio albums

- Giant Palm (2022)
- Below a Massive Dark Land (2024)
