= Adam Riches =

English comedian

- Born: Adam Riches; 29 March 1973 (age 53); Cambridge, Cambridgeshire, England
- Occupations: Comedian, actor
- Years active: 1998–present
- Spouse: Stevie Martin (m. 2022)

Adam Riches (born 29 March 1973) is an English comedian and actor who won the Foster's Edinburgh Comedy Award in 2011. After his success at the Edinburgh Fringe, he became familiar to UK television audiences through his exaggerated comic parody of actor Sean Bean on the panel show 8 Out of 10 Cats Does Countdown between 2016 and 2020.

== Early life ==
Riches was born in Cambridge, England, but was raised in Glasgow and London. His mother, a Scot, worked as a teacher in a daycare nursery, and his father was a restaurant manager at a Berni Inn on Cowcaddens' Hope Street, near Sauchiehall Street, Glasgow. He has four brothers.

Growing up, he wanted to be a football-playing cowboy.

His first job was a paper round when he was 13, for which he earned £3 per week (or 60 pence per day, for the five days he worked).

Riches attended Sutton Grammar School for Boys.

Following a brief spell working at Disneyland Paris, where he was a waiter (and where he was fired "for being cheeky"), he studied Media and Performance at Salford University. He worked as a bit-part actor on television before doing his first show at the Edinburgh Festival Fringe in 2003.

In his late 20s, Riches switched his attention to American comedies, most notably Cheers, which remains his favourite show.

== Comedic style ==
Riches' performances involve audience participation, including getting audience members to play swingball and race on skateboards.

== Career ==
Riches has appeared in Dictionary Corner on 8 Out of 10 Cats Does Countdown on four occasions: in October 2016, June 2017, September 2019 and August 2020. For his appearances, he was entirely in character as an exaggerated comic parody of the actor Sean Bean, a character he first portrayed in an audition tape for Saturday Night Live. He was introduced as "Sean Bean" by the announcer at the beginning of each episode, and addressed as "Sean" by presenter Jimmy Carr throughout. "I'm a big fan of Sean, and there was something very nice to latch onto. He's proved a popular character and he opens [Adam of the Riches]," said Riches in 2014.

He played the character of Tony, the boyfriend of Lance's ex-wife Maggie, in the first series of the BBC television series Detectorists. He has also appeared in the BBC children's series Horrible Histories.

The Adam Riches Experience toured the UK between April and July 2019.

=== Edinburgh Fringe shows ===
Riches first attended the Edinburgh Fringe in the mid-1990s, during his second year at university.

- Plat du Nuit - The Comeback Special (2003). Riches and Jim Johnson played a lounge music act attempting a comeback.
- Victor (2007). Riches played Victor Legit, a surveillance officer combatting copyright violation. The Scotsman gave it three stars out of five.
- Alpha Males (2008). Riches played various characters, including the return of Victor. One night while performing this show, Riches slipped on some yogurt and broke his leg; he returned five days later, performing in a wheelchair. The show got four stars from The Scotsman.
- Rogue Males (2009). Riches regards this as his best Fringe show. The List gave it four out of five stars.
- Adam Riches Rides! (2010).
- Bring Me the Head of Adam Riches (2011). His Edinburgh Comedy Award-winning show, also receiving five stars from The Daily Telegraph and The Independent. It later transferred to the Soho Theatre, London, in 2012.
- Adam of the Riches (2014).
- Coach Coach (2015). "It's an American high-school sports movie done, for real, on stage. A match that happens in the last fifteen minutes is done right in front of you. We've got two different endings: one for if we win and one for if we lose." As of the third show of the festival, the winning one had not happened. The show was given three out of five stars by The Guardian.
- The Beakington Town Hall Murders (2019), a return of Victor Legit.

== Personal life ==
As of 2012, Riches was living in Kew, London, with his wife, comedian Stevie Martin. The couple married in late 2022 in Edinburgh.

He is a fan of Liverpool F.C.
