= Kiran Leonard =

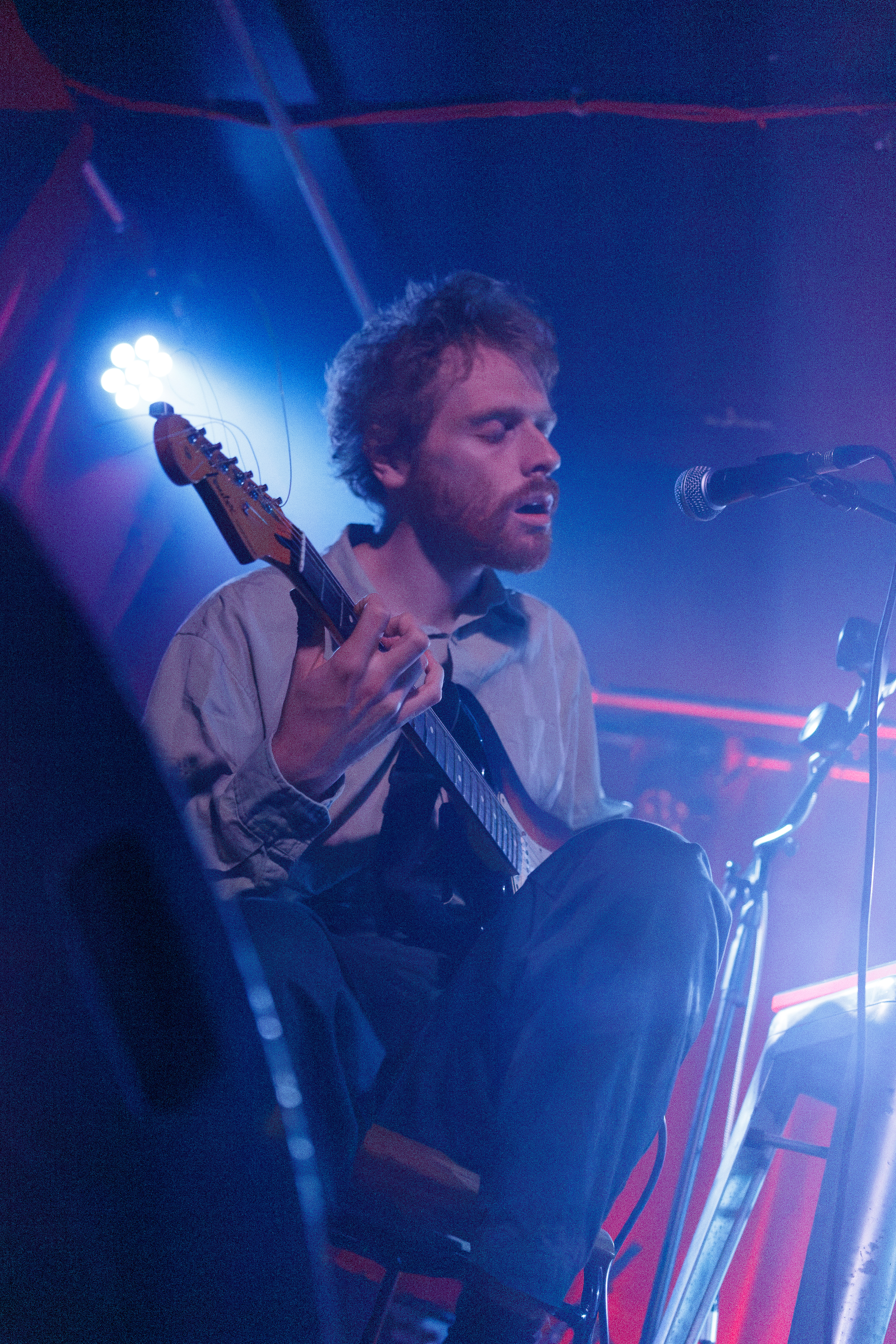
- Leonard playing with Or Sobre Blau in 2026

Background information
- Also known as: Pend Oreille, Akrotiri Poacher, Advol
- Born: John Kiran Leonard; 1 September 1995 (age 30); Saddleworth, Greater Manchester
- Genres: Art rock, avant-garde music, progressive rock, psychedelic music, electronic music
- Instruments: Vocals, guitar, mandolin, drum kit, banjo, bass guitar, piano, organ
- Years active: 2008–present
- Labels: Hand of Glory, Moshi Moshi, Mute Song, Memorials of Distinction
- Website: kiranleonardhtmlwebsite5555.co.uk

Kiran Leonard is an English musician, composer and singer-songwriter from Saddleworth, Greater Manchester.

== Career ==
Leonard was born into a musical family in the countryside of Greater Manchester. He first learned to play mandolin and guitar and then, inspired by his older brother's diverse music collection, began to experiment with composing electronic music.

After a period of prolifically self-releasing experimental music, Leonard's full length album Bowler Hat Soup was released in 2012 on Hand of Glory Records to some acclaim, receiving notable endorsement from DJ Marc Riley of BBC Radio 6 Music. His subsequent LP Grapefruit (2016), released on Moshi Moshi Records, likewise received critical acclaim.

Leonard's music notably references a wide variety of literature, historical figures and geographical locations: his 2017 LP Derevaun Seraun documented a collection of pieces commissioned by Manchester Central Library inspired by works by James Joyce, Albert Camus, Henry Miller, Clarice Lispector and Manuel Bandeira, while Grapefruit makes reference to Ondör Gongor, Caiaphas, the Bilderberg Group, Lagavulin and Werner Herzog, Bowler Hat Soup to Friedrich Nietzsche, Brunswick Street, Port Ainé and Bora Bora, Thread Colours (2015) to Franz Kafka and Windermere, and Garden in Bermuda (2016) to Annie Edson Taylor and Coyoacán. He has cited musicians such as Frank Zappa, Richard Dawson, The Mars Volta and Kate Bush as important influences on his music.

== Personal life ==
Leonard studied Spanish and Portuguese at Wadham College, Oxford University.

== Select discography ==
=== Albums ===
- Selected Passive Drones, Part II: Organic Journey (2009)
- The Big Fish (2011)
- A Seed is a Sovereign (2012, compilation)
- The End Times (2012)
- Oakland Highball EP (2013)
- Multi-Titled Summer Tour CD (2013)
- Bowler Hat Soup 2LP (2013)
- Spring Rounds CD (2014) Collection of live, field and home recordings
- Terreiro do Paço (2014)
- Abandoning Noble Goals EP (2015)
- Grapefruit 2LP (2016)
- Garden in Bermuda CD (2016) Collection of songs credited to Kiran Leonard as well as his Advol, Pend Oreille and Akrotiri Poacher pseudonyms
- Derevaun Seraun LP (2017)
- Monarchs of the Crescent Pail cassette (2017)
- A Bit of Violence With These Old Engines cassette (2018)
- Western Culture LP (2018)
- Trespass On Foot double album, cassette (2021)
- River Holds Peace, Some Live LP (2023)
- Real Home LP (2024)

=== As Pend Oreille ===
- YLA EP (2012)
- Thread Colours (2015)

=== As Akrotiri Poacher ===
- Silence Within Buildings (2010)
- Jane Barbe / Akrotiri Poacher (2011) Split with Jane Barbe
- Seminary (2012)
- Motiongazer / Akrotiri Poacher (2014) Split with Motiongazer
