= Goat Girl =

British post-punk band

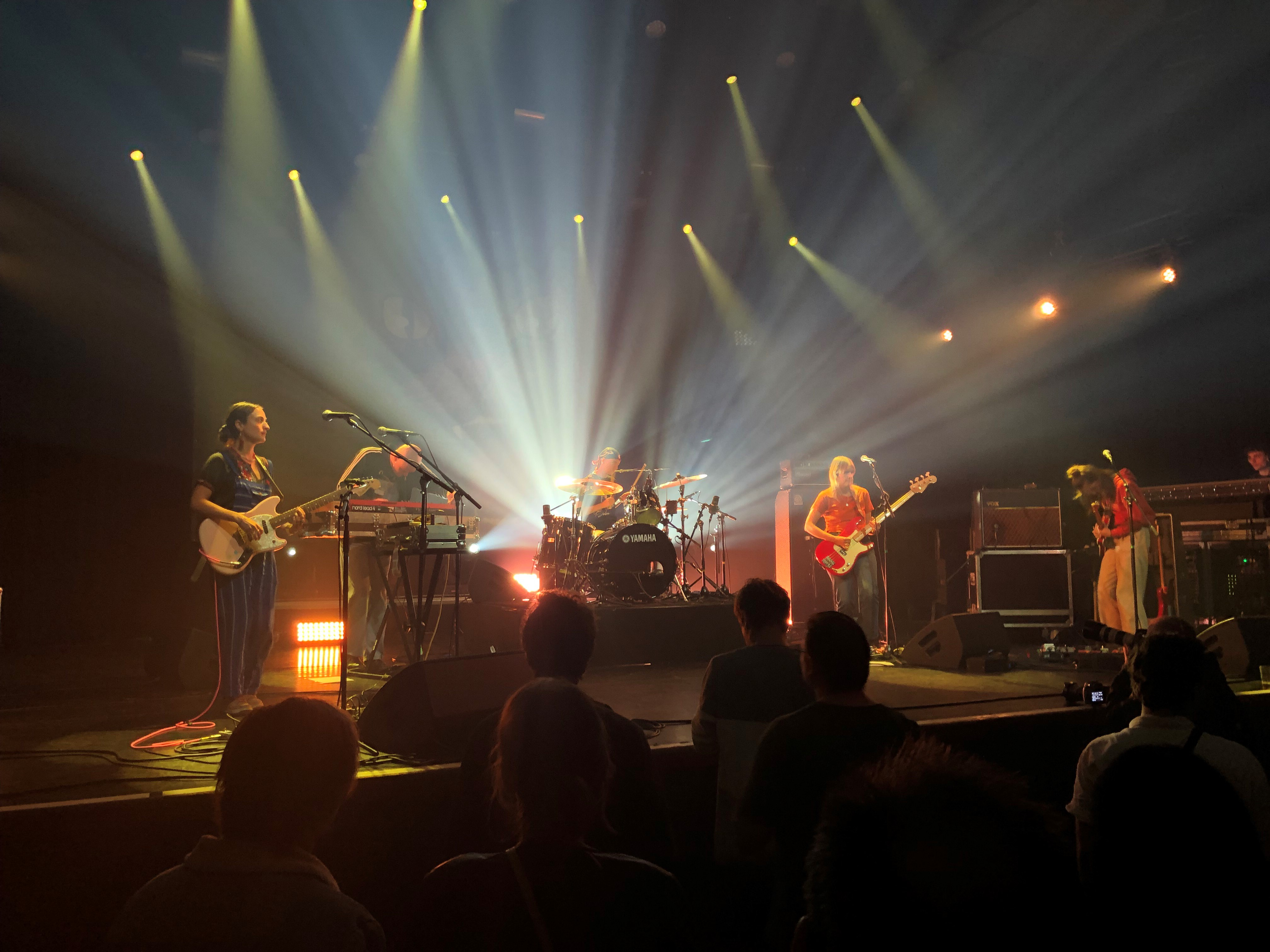
- Goat Girl playing Sniester Festival 2022, The Hague

Background information
- Origin: London, England
- Genre: Post-punk
- Years active: 2015–present
- Label: Rough Trade Records
- Members: Lottie Pendlebury; Rosy Bones; Holly Mullineaux
- Past members: Naima Bock; Ellie Rose Davies
- Website: goatgirl.co.uk

Goat Girl are an English post-punk band from South London. Their initial lineup consisted of lead vocalist and guitarist Clottie Cream (Lottie Pendlebury), guitarist and occasional lead vocalist L.E.D. (Ellie Rose Davies), bassist Naima Jelly (Naima Bock) and drummer Rosy Bones (Rosy Jones). UK music magazine DIY describe them as being "imbued with an innate ability to voice the socio-political concerns of their peers with wit and style". In 2019, bassist Holly Hole (Holly Mullineaux) joined the band, replacing Naima Jelly.

== History ==
=== Formation and signing to Rough Trade ===
The band played early gigs in The Windmill, Brixton and named themselves after comedian Bill Hicks' character 'Goat Boy'. They signed a deal with Rough Trade Records on 24 July 2016, and put out a couple of singles prior to the release of their debut album two years later. During this time, they also supported The Fall in their final London show before Mark E. Smith's death, at the 100 Club on 27 July 2017.

=== Debut album ===
Their self-titled debut album was released in April 2018. Featuring 19 tracks, it was well-received by the music press. Pitchfork described it as "absurd, playful, and more than a little unsettling, sounding at times like a less romantic Libertines," going on to say the album, "appears daunting but proves to be light and accessible, with plenty of offbeat wit and many an unexpected twist down gothic country roads." The Guardian called it "a weird, wily and unpredictable record, getting under the surface of things." The band played on the John Peel stage at the Glastonbury Festival 2019.

== Influences ==
Goat Girl have cited influences including Country Teasers, Sonic Youth, Blonde Redhead, Rico Nasty, Silver Jews, Rihanna, Gwen Stefani, Joni Mitchell, Caroline, This Heat, Broadcast, Lankum, Deli Girls, Gilla Band, Nirvana, Sly and the Family Stone, Lord Woodbine, John Martyn, Kelis, Mariah Carey, Destiny's Child, Little Simz, Schneider TM, the Breeders, the Strokes, Young Marble Giants, Joy Division, Bombay Bicycle Club, Bloc Party, Steve Reich and Philip Glass.

== Discography ==
=== Albums ===
- Goat Girl (2018), Rough Trade
- On All Fours (2021), Rough Trade
- Below the Waste (2024), Rough Trade

=== EPs ===
- Udder Sounds (2018), Rough Trade

=== Singles ===
- "Country Sleaze"/"Scum" (2016), Rough Trade
- "Crow Cries" (2017), Rough Trade
- "Cracker Drool" (2017), Rough Trade
- "The Man" (2018), Rough Trade
- "Throw Me a Bone" (2018), Rough Trade
- "Sad Cowboy" (2020), Rough Trade
- "The Crack" (2020), Rough Trade
- "Badibaba" (2021), Rough Trade
- "Ride Around" (2024), Rough Trade
- "Motorway" (2024), Rough Trade
