= Cameron Picton =

English musician (born 1999)

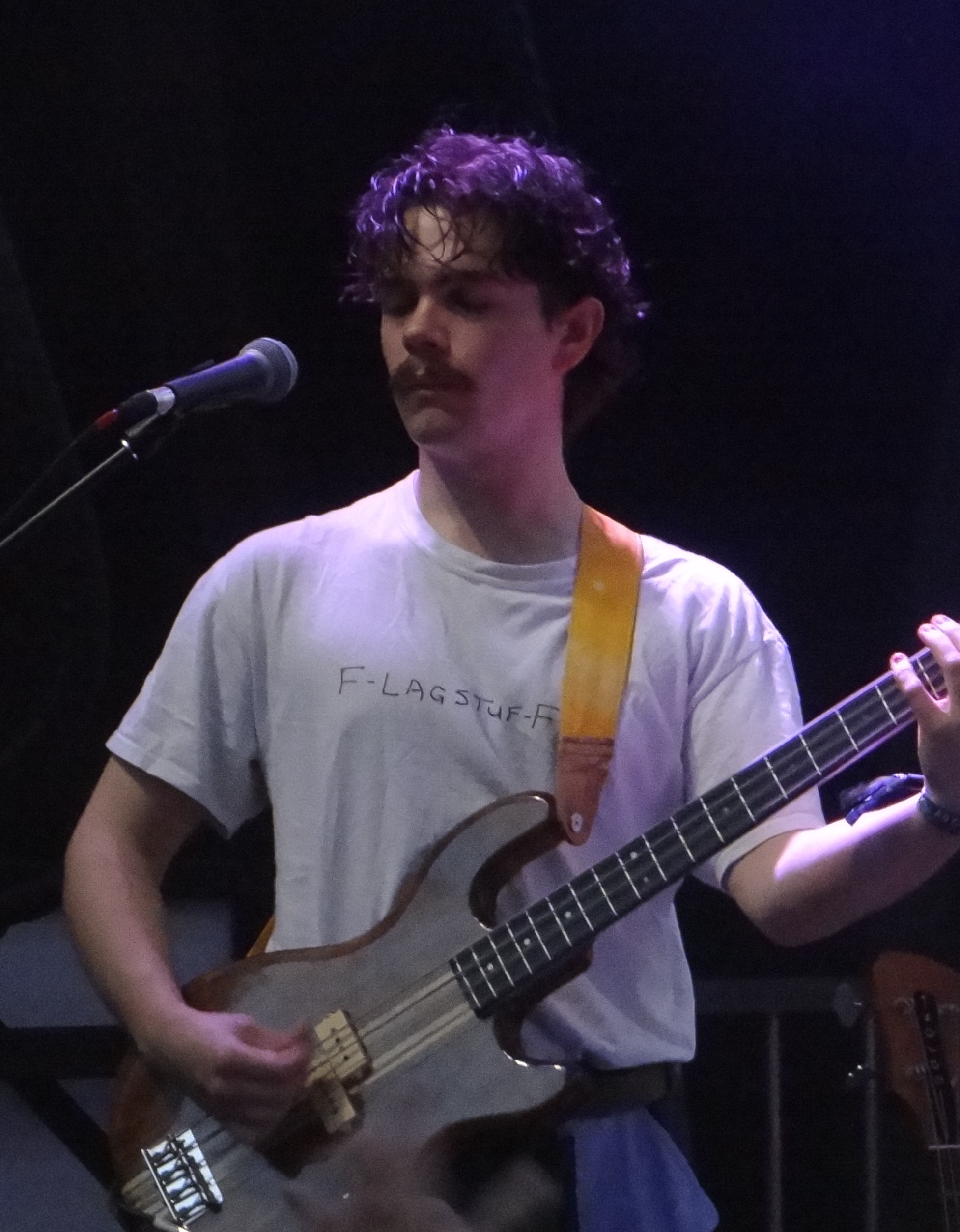
- Picton playing Shaky Knees Music Festival with Black Midi in 2021
- Born: Cameron Overeynder; 7 June 1999 (age 27)
- Occupation: Musician
- Years active: 2017–present
- Musical career
- Genres: Experimental rock; math rock; avant-prog; art rock; chamber pop
- Instruments: Vocals; bass; guitar; keyboards; flute
- Labels: Rough Trade; Speedy Wunderground
- Member of: My New Band Believe
- Formerly of: Black Midi

Cameron Overeynder (born 7 June 1999), known professionally as Cameron Picton, is an English musician and singer. From 2017 to 2024, he was the bassist and a guitarist for the experimental rock band Black Midi. He went on to found the band My New Band Believe in 2025, in which he performs guitar and lead vocals.

== Life and career ==
=== Early life ===
Picton attended BRIT School, where he met future Black Midi bandmates Geordie Greep, Matt Kwasniewski-Kelvin, and Morgan Simpson.

=== 2016–2024: Black Midi ===
Black Midi was formed in 2016 with Picton performing on bass, vocals, and additional guitars. The band played their first gig at Brixton's The Windmill on 12 June 2017, supporting the band Leg Puppy, and would go on to have a residency at the venue. In 2019, Black Midi released their debut studio album, Schlagenheim, to critical acclaim.

Picton released two more albums with Black Midi, Cavalcade (2021) and Hellfire (2022), both to further critical acclaim. On 10 August 2024, Black Midi guitarist Geordie Greep announced via Instagram Live that Black Midi would be "indefinitely over." Picton confirmed the split on Twitter, admitting that the band "agreed not to say anything about 'breaking up'" and that he was blindsided by Greep's comments. The band's management released statements clarifying that the band is on an indefinite hiatus to focus on solo careers.

=== 2024–present: Camera Picture and My New Band Believe ===
In 2024, Picton began performing solo shows under the name Camera Picture. He released three single-track mixtapes as Camera Picture, titled 44m50s, 36m33s, and 24m56s. Each was sold exclusively at solo shows, which Picton confirmed via interview were released to further fund his studio costs. During these solo performances, Picton began collaborating with the band Caroline, which would eventually lead to the formation of My New Band Believe, which was led by Picton. While touring with Black Country, New Road in 2024, Picton began writing songs for the project. Picton said that "functionally" the album was created as a solo record, but that his role was to curate what he had already created with other instrumentalists.

In February 2025, My New Band Believe released their first single, "Lecture 25". On 17 February 2026, the band released another single, "Numerology," and announced the release of their debut self-titled album. The album was released on 10 April 2026 to critical acclaim. Picton announced a tour of the UK and North America to support the album, starting 28 April and ending 7 June 2026.

== Discography ==
=== With Black Midi ===
- Schlagenheim (2019)
- Cavalcade (2021)
- Hellfire (2022)

=== As Camera Picture ===
- 44m50s (2024)
- 36m33s (2024)
- 24m56s (2025)

=== With My New Band Believe ===
- My New Band Believe (2026)
