= Caroline (band) =

English rock band

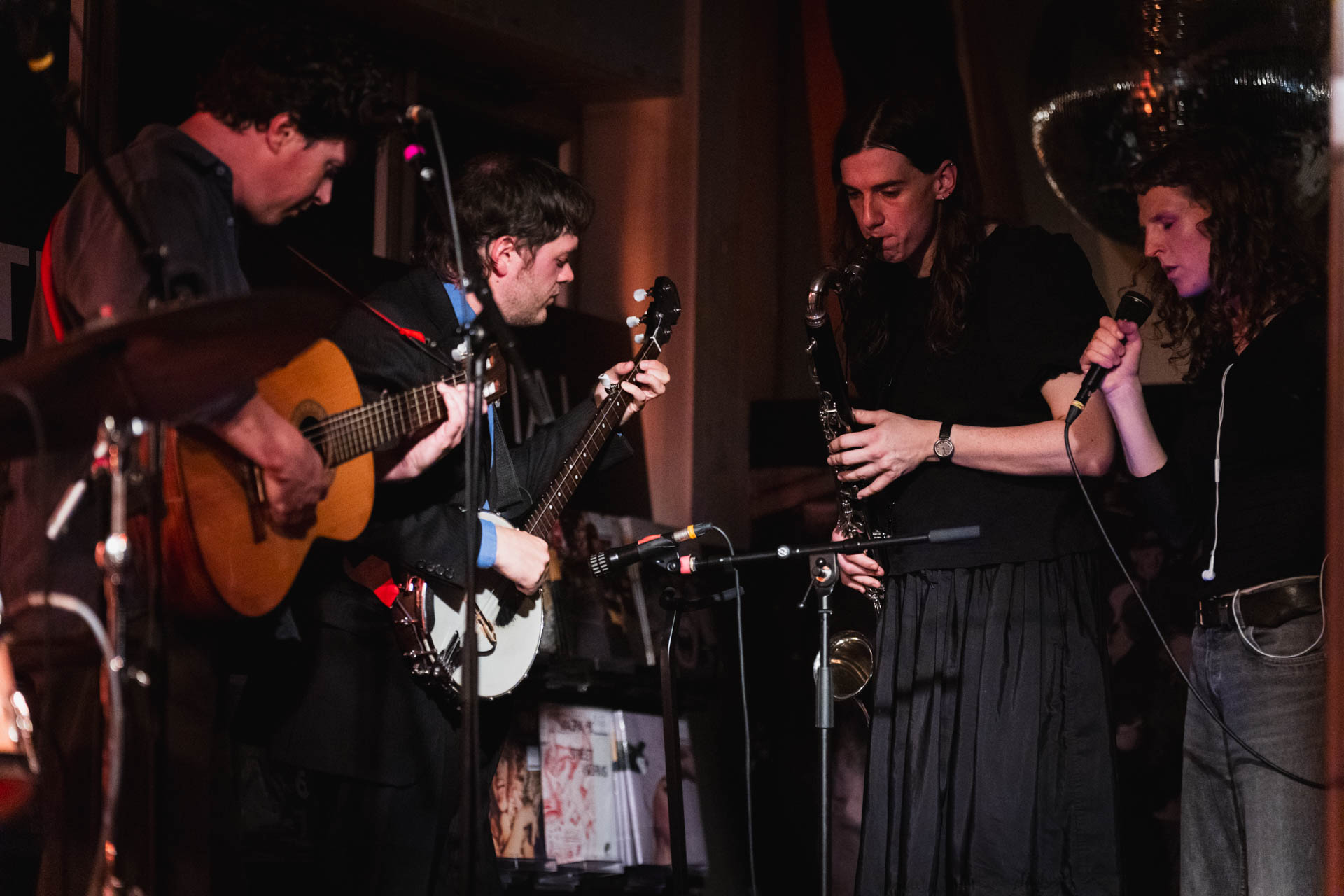
- Caroline in 2025

Background information
- Origin: London, England
- Genres: Post-rock; folk rock
- Years active: 2017–present
- Label: Rough Trade
- Members: Casper Hughes; Jasper Llewellyn; Mike O’Malley; Oliver Hamilton; Magdalena McLean; Freddy Wordsworth; Alex McKenzie; Hugh Aynsley
- Website: caroline.band

Caroline (stylised in all lowercase) are an English rock band formed in London in 2017, consisting of Casper Hughes, Jasper Llewellyn, Mike O’Malley, Oliver Hamilton, Magdalena McLean, Freddy Wordsworth, Alex McKenzie, and Hugh Aynsley.

The band have released two studio albums – Caroline (2022) and Caroline 2 (2025) – to widespread critical acclaim.

== Career ==
The band was formed in 2017 by Jasper Llewellyn, Mike O’Malley and Casper Hughes. Hughes and Llewellyn began playing music together while studying at the University of Manchester, and the lineup of the band slowly expanded over the years into its current 8-piece format. Initial material came from weekly improvisation sessions, from which songs were reworked to form material for their debut self-titled album, caroline, which was released on February 25, 2022. Caroline was mostly recorded in 2020. In support for their upcoming North American tour, the band released a cover of Claire Rousay's "Peak Chroma" as a single on September 26, 2022.

In May 2023, a Tiny Desk Concert by caroline was published. The band performed "Good morning (red)", "Dark blue" and "Skydiving onto the library roof".

Their second album, Caroline 2, was released on May 30, 2025. Two singles from the album, "Total euphoria" and "Tell me I never knew that", were released on March 18, 2025 and April 15, 2025, respectively. The latter features Caroline Polachek. Pitchfork gave the album an 8.4 (Best New Music) with reviewer Ian Cohen stating that the record featured "yearning, irresolute melodies; plaintive, plainspoken lyrics; and hours of analog improvisation ... honed in painstaking digital post-production."

== Musical style ==
Caroline are described as a band that approaches various genres such as folk rock and Midwest emo based on post-rock. O'Malley also played Appalachian folk standards with Llewellyn and drummer/percussionist Hugh Aynsley as a teenager, which formed an influence on the debut.

== Influences ==
In an interview with Pitchfork, the band described key single "Good Morning (Red)" as being inspired by the rise of Jeremy Corbyn's socialist Labour Party movement in 2017, and the "wave of optimism" that came alongside it.

== Members ==
- Casper Hughes – guitar, vocals
- Jasper Llewellyn – cello, drums, vocals, guitar
- Mike O’Malley – guitar, bass, vocals, keyboards, cello, percussion
- Oliver Hamilton – violin, vocals
- Magdalena McLean – violin, vocals
- Freddy Wordsworth – trumpet, trombone, bass, vocals
- Alex McKenzie – clarinet, saxophone, flute, vocals
- Hugh Aynsley – drums, percussion

== Discography ==
=== Studio albums ===
- Caroline (2022)
- Caroline 2 (2025)

=== Singles ===
- "Dark blue" (2020)
- "Skydiving Onto the Library Roof" / "Everything for Everyone" (2021)
- "Peak Chroma" (2022)
- "Total Euphoria" (2025)
- "Tell Me I Never Knew That" (2025)
