= Arise =

Arise or arose may refer to:

- Ghost in the Shell: Arise, a 2013 series of films based on the manga by Masamune Shirow
- Arise (horse) (born 1946), American Thoroughbred racehorse
- Arise (film), a 2010 feature film documentary
- Arise!: the SubGenius Video, a 1992 comedic documentary covering the Church of the SubGenius
- Arise India, an electronic manufacturing company in India
- Arise News, a world news TV channel
- Arise: A Simple Story, a video game
- Arise (political party), a local political party in the London Borough of Harrow, England

== Music ==
- Arise (band), a Swedish heavy metal band
- Arise! (Amebix album), 1985
- Arise Volume 3, a 2009 album by Rebellion
- Arise (Planetshakers album)
- Arise (Sepultura album), 1991
- Arise (Zara McFarlane album), 2017

=== Songs ===
- "Arise" (Sepultura song), 1991
- "Arise" (Flyleaf song)
- "Arise!", an alternate name for "March of the Volunteers", the Chinese national anthem
- "Arise", a song by Avalon from the album Reborn
- "Arise", a song by Chevelle from the album Hats Off to the Bull
- "Arise", a song by Samuel E. Wright from the Disney 1990 album Sebastian from The Little Mermaid
- "Arise!", a song by Armenian composer Robert Amirkhanyan
- "Arose", a song by Eminem from the album Revival

== Acronym ==
ARISE may refer to:

- ARISE Detroit!, a coalition of community groups in Detroit
- ARISE, an Anti-Racism, Imperialism, Sectarianism and Exploitation campaign organised by Ógra Shinn Féin
- ARISE (political party), a regional political party in the Philippines
