= Loggerhead =

Loggerhead or Loggerheads may refer to:

== Places ==
- Loggerheads, Denbighshire, a village in Denbighshire, Wales
- Loggerheads, Staffordshire, a small village in north Staffordshire, England
- Loggerhead Key, the largest islet in the Dry Tortugas, Florida
- Loggerheads and Whitmore ward, a ward in the borough of Newcastle-under-Lyme, England
- Loggerhead Park, a 17-acre recreational area in Juno Beach, Florida with a beach

== Fauna and flora ==
- Loggerhead sea turtle, the sea turtle Caretta caretta
- Loggerhead musk turtle, the freshwater turtle Sternotherus minor
- Loggerhead kingbird, the passerine bird Tyrannus caudifasciatus
- Loggerhead shrike, the passerine bird Lanius ludovicianus
- Loggerheads or Centaurea, a genus of flowering plants
  - Common knapweed or loggerheads (Centaurea nigra), a flowering plant
- Loggerhead sponge, a species of seaweed sponge

== Media ==
- Loggerheads (2005 film), a film written and directed by Tim Kirkman
- Loggerheads (1978 film), a film directed by Castellano & Pipolo
- Loggerheads (1993), an album by Canadian punk band D.O.A.
- Loggerheads (play), a 1925 play by Ralph Cullinan
- Loggerhead (album), 2022 album by Wu-Lu

== Other ==
- Loggerhead (tool), two iron balls attached by an iron rod used by shipbuilders to melt pitch
- USS Loggerhead (SS-374), a Balao-class submarine launched in 1944
- Loggerheads, the heraldic term for leopards' faces on the coat of arms and flag of Shropshire
- Loggerhead turtle (disambiguation)
- At loggerheads, an idiom.
