= Wulu =

Wulu may refer to:

- Wulu County, Lakes State, South Sudan
- Wùlu, 2016 Malian film by Daouda Coulibaly
- Wulu (Emperor De) (fl. 10th century?), ancestor of the Jin dynasty emperors
- Emperor Shizong of Jin (1123–1189), personal name Wulu
- Wulu, Liaoning, town in Zhuanghe, Liaoning, China
- Wulu railway station in Beijing, China
- Wu-Lu, London musician
