= Arise! =

Arise! may refer to

- "The March of the Volunteers", the Chinese national anthem, also sometimes known by the English translation of its refrain Qilai!
- Arise!, an album by Amebix

== See also ==
- Arise (disambiguation)
