= Loggerhead turtle (disambiguation) =

Loggerhead turtle may refer to:

- Loggerhead sea turtle (Caretta caretta), also called the loggerhead, a species of sea turtle found throughout the world
- Loggerhead musk turtle (Sternotherus minor), a species of turtle in the family Kinosternidae, native to the southern US
- Alligator snapping turtle (Macrochelys temminckii), a species of turtle in the family Chelydridae, native to freshwater in the US

== See also ==
- Loggerhead (disambiguation)
