= Zara McFarlane =

British jazz/soul singer-songwriter (born 1983)

- Born: 1983 (age 41–42); London, England
- Genres: Jazz, Soul, Reggae, Dance, House, Experimental
- Occupation(s): Singer, songwriter, producer, vocal coach
- Instrument: Vocal
- Labels: Brownswood Recordings !K7 Music/Eternal Source of Light
- Website: zaramcfarlane.com

Zara McFarlane (born 1983) is a British music artist, singer, songwriter, composer, vocal coach and playwright based in East London, England. The critically acclaimed singer has released five albums under her own name. Jazzwise magazine wrote that McFarlane "is one of the UK’s pre-eminent jazz vocalists and composers". She is a multi-award winner, including a MOBO Awards., two Jazz FM awards and an Urban Music award.

== Early life ==
Zara McFarlane was born in London, England, in 1983 and grew up on the borders of East London and Essex. She was born to parents of Jamaican heritage, which has had a big influence on her musical tastes. At the age of 14, she performed on the national TV show Stars In Their Eyes, performing as Lauryn Hill.

At the age of 16, McFarlane studied Musical theatre at the BRIT School. She went on to the study at Vocaltech, achieving a first-class Honours BMUS in Popular Music Performance. In 2022, after completing a master's degree in jazz studies at Guildhall School of Music and Drama, she was awarded a Fellowship.

In addition, McFarlane developed her skills in jazz through music development organisation Tomorrow's Warriors, where she met many of the musicians she performs and collaborates with today.

== Career ==
McFarlane's self-released her debut album, Until Tomorrow, in 2011. It garnered the attention of British DJ and producer Gilles Peterson, who released it on his label Brownswood Recordings in 2011. Music critics Daniel Garrett hailed McFarlane's "bell-like voice" and Bruce Lindsay at All About Jazz wrote: "Until Tomorrow is filled with musical treasures, waiting to be discovered."

McFarlane's second album, If You Knew Her, was released in 2014. Ben Ratliff at The New York Times commented that "its identity derives from Ms. McFarlane's clear, elegant voice, and the musicians' training and influences". While she was touring in support of the album, music critic John Fordham remarked on her "magnetic eloquence".

McFarlane's third release, 2017's Arise, was produced by British drummer Moses Boyd. It received a 4-star review from The Guardian.

Her 2020 album Songs of An Unknown Tongue was born out of her extended trip to Jamaica in 2018 to research the early folk rhythms unique to the island. In a culmination of this research and a subversion of the colonial legacy of slavery, McFarlane teamed up with London producers Kwake Bass and Wu-Lu to explore a meeting point between current electronic sounds and the historic traditional rhythms of Jamaica.

In 2021, McFarlane was commissioned by Los Angeles-based experimental dance company Jacob Jonas The Company to compose, produce and perform the music for the short dance film DisInteGrated. Choreographed and directed by Wade Robson and Tony Testa, the piece won a Los Angeles Movie Award for Best Experimental Short in 2022.

McFarlane's 2024 release Sweet Whispers: Celebrating Sarah Vaughan is a homage to one of her idols on her centenary year. It marks her first release on !K7 Music/Eternal Source of Light. The album was developed in collaboration with producer, clarinetist and saxophonist Giacomo Smith. The Guardian's John Fordham listed it as Album of the Month and gave it a 4-star review in which he wrote: "The British jazz singer pays homage to Vaughan with earthiness and spontaneity: an animated reinvention of these classics." In 2024, she celebrated Vaughan's centenary year in concert with Gast Waltzing and the Luxembourg Philharmonic Orchestra.

In 2024, McFarlane performed the National Anthem at the FA Cup Final in Wembley Stadium.

McFarlane has collaborated with a wide range of artists across various genres, including DJ's Nicola Conte, Little Louie Vega and Nicola Conte, electronica musician Manu Delago, dub producer Dennis Bovell, British musicians Gary Crosby's Jazz Jamaica, Ezra Collective, Soweto Kinch, Shabaka Hutchings and American trumpeter Leron Thomas.

McFarlane's tracks have been remixed and reworked by British producer Swindle, Viennese Techno Duo Ogris Debris, Ninja Tune's Floating Points, Afro-Funker Osunlade and Space-Jazzers Emanative. McFarlane paid tribute to Tammi Terrell with Norwegian Dj/Producer Dalminjo. She has also been a supporting act for South African trumpeter Hugh Masekela and vocalists Gregory Porter, Dianne Reeves and Gwen McCrae.

=== Theatre ===
In 2018, McFarlane was a featured singer in the Royal Shakespeare Company productions of Anthony and Cleopatra and Swingin' a Dream. The same year, she was featured at Glyndebourne Festival Opera in a new piece by Howard Moody entitled Agreed.

=== Television and radio ===
In 2014, McFarlane was the solo voice of Skyscanner's 1st TV ad campaign.

Representing Jamaica, McFarlane performed at the Barbican Centre in 2014 as part of the Commonwealth Week celebrating South African musician Hugh Masekela.

In 2015, she performed on an episode of the BBC TV drama The Outcast.

McFarlane has made television appearances on Later... with Jools Holland (BBC Two), Un Lugar Llamado Mundo and the live broadcast of Victoires du Jazz. She has also made radio appearances worldwide, with performances on Jamie Cullum's show on BBC Radio 2, NTS Radio and TSF Jazz.

=== Vocal coaching ===
McFarlane has her own company called Singtivate, where as a vocal coach she teaches privately, in education establishments and with businesses for professional development.

== Awards ==
- 2012: MOBO Award, Best Jazz Act, Nominee
- 2014: MOBO Award, Best Jazz Act, Winner
- 2014: Parliamentary Jazz Award, Vocalist of the Year, Nominee
- 2015: Urban Music Award, Best Jazz, Winner
- 2015: Jazz FM Award, Vocalist of the Year, Winner
- 2015: Worldwide Awards, Album of the Year, Nominee
- 2015: Parliamentary Jazz Award, Vocalist of the Year, Nominee
- 2018: Jazz FM Award, Vocalist of the Year, Winner
- 2018: Worldwide Awards, Session of the Year, Winner
- 2018: Parliamentary Jazz Award, Vocalist of the Year, Nominee
- 2020: Best Art Vinyl, Best Art Vinyl 2020, Nominee

== Discography ==
=== As leader ===
- 2011: Until Tomorrow (Brownswood)
- 2014: If You Knew Her (Brownswood)
- 2017: Arise (Brownswood)
- 2020: Songs of an Unknown Tongue (Brownswood)
- 2024: Sweet Whispers: Celebrating Sarah Vaughan (!K7 Music/Eternal Source of Light)

=== Singles & EP's ===
- 2011: Chiaroscuro (Brownswood)
- 2012: More Than Mine (Brownswood)
- 2013: Angie La La (Brownswood)
- 2014: Lazy Afternoon (Brownswood)
- 2014: Move (Brownswood)
- 2017: All Africa (Brownswood)
- 2019: East of the River Nile (Brownswood)
- 2020: Black Treasure (Brownswood)
- 2020: Future Echoes (Brownswood)
- 2020: Everything Is Connected (Brownswood)
- 2020: Native Nomad (Brownswood)
- 2020: State of Mind (Brownswood)
- 2022: DisInteGrated
- 2024: The Mystery of Man (!K7 Music/Eternal Source of Light)
- 2024: If You Could See Me Now (!K7 Music/Eternal Source of Light)

=== As guest ===
- 2011: Brownswood Bubblers Seven, Gilles Peterson (Brownswood)
- 2015: Christmas Soul, Barbara Dennerlein and Magnus Lindgren (MPS
