= Flip (cocktail) =

Class of mixed drinks

Flips
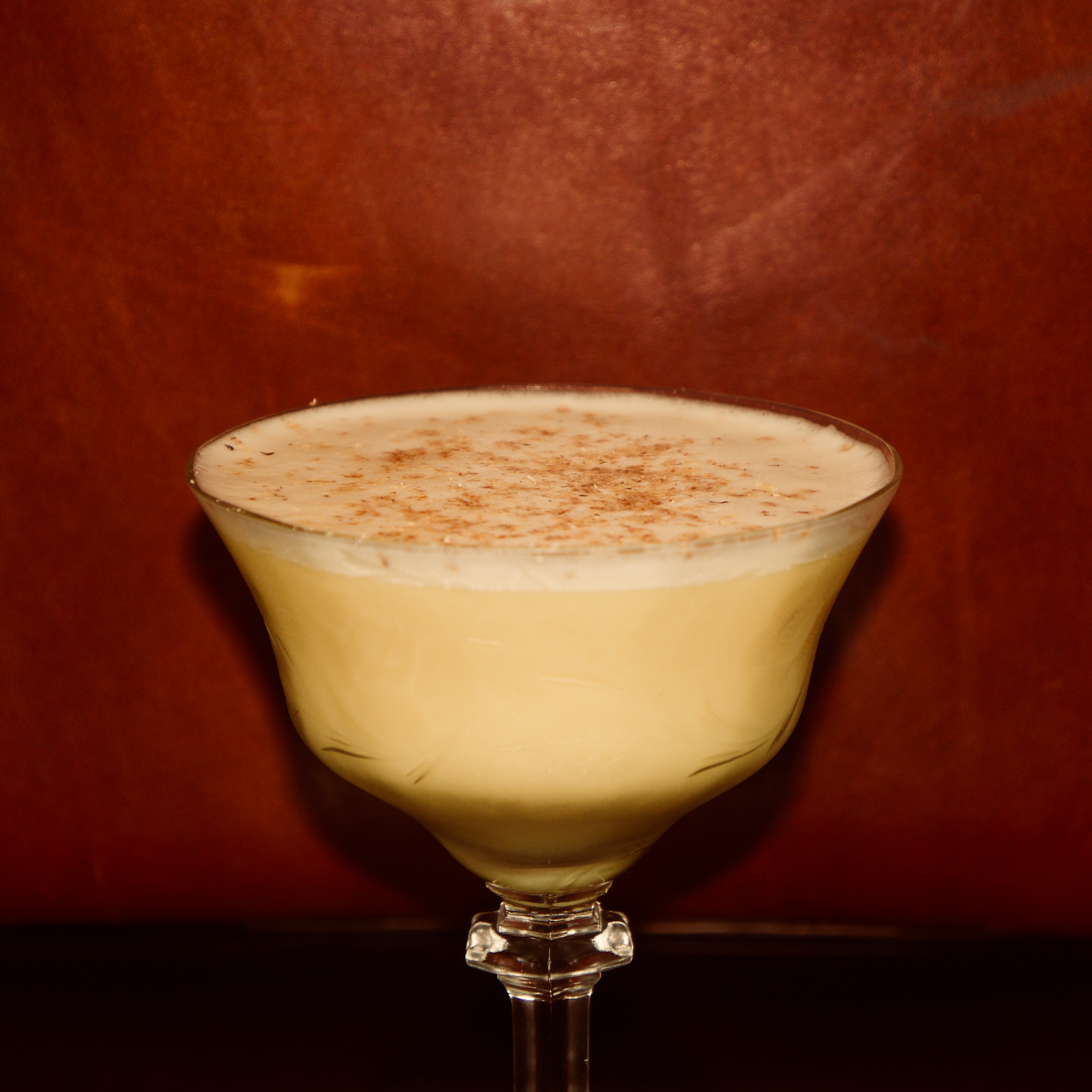
- A flip made from brandy, an egg, and simple syrup is shown served in a stemmed cocktail glass and garnished with grated nutmeg.
- Type: Cocktail family
- Ingredients: Whole, raw egg
- Base spirit: Whiskey, Brandy, Rum

A flip is a class of mixed drink. According to the Oxford English Dictionary, the term was first used in 1695 to describe a mixture of beer, rum, and sugar, heated with a red-hot iron. The drink has evolved, egg was added, the sugar proportion increased, beer was removed, and it ceased to be served hot.

The first bar guide to feature a flip was Jerry Thomas' 1862 How to Mix Drinks; or, The Bon-Vivant's Companion. In this work, Thomas declared that "the essential in flips of all sorts is to produce the smoothness by repeated pouring back and forward between two vessels and beating up the eggs well in the first instance the sweetening and spices according to taste."

Over time, U.S. bar guides clarified the difference between eggnog and a flip. Eggnog contains a spirit, egg, cream, sugar, and spice, while a flip contains the same ingredients, but without cream.

== History ==
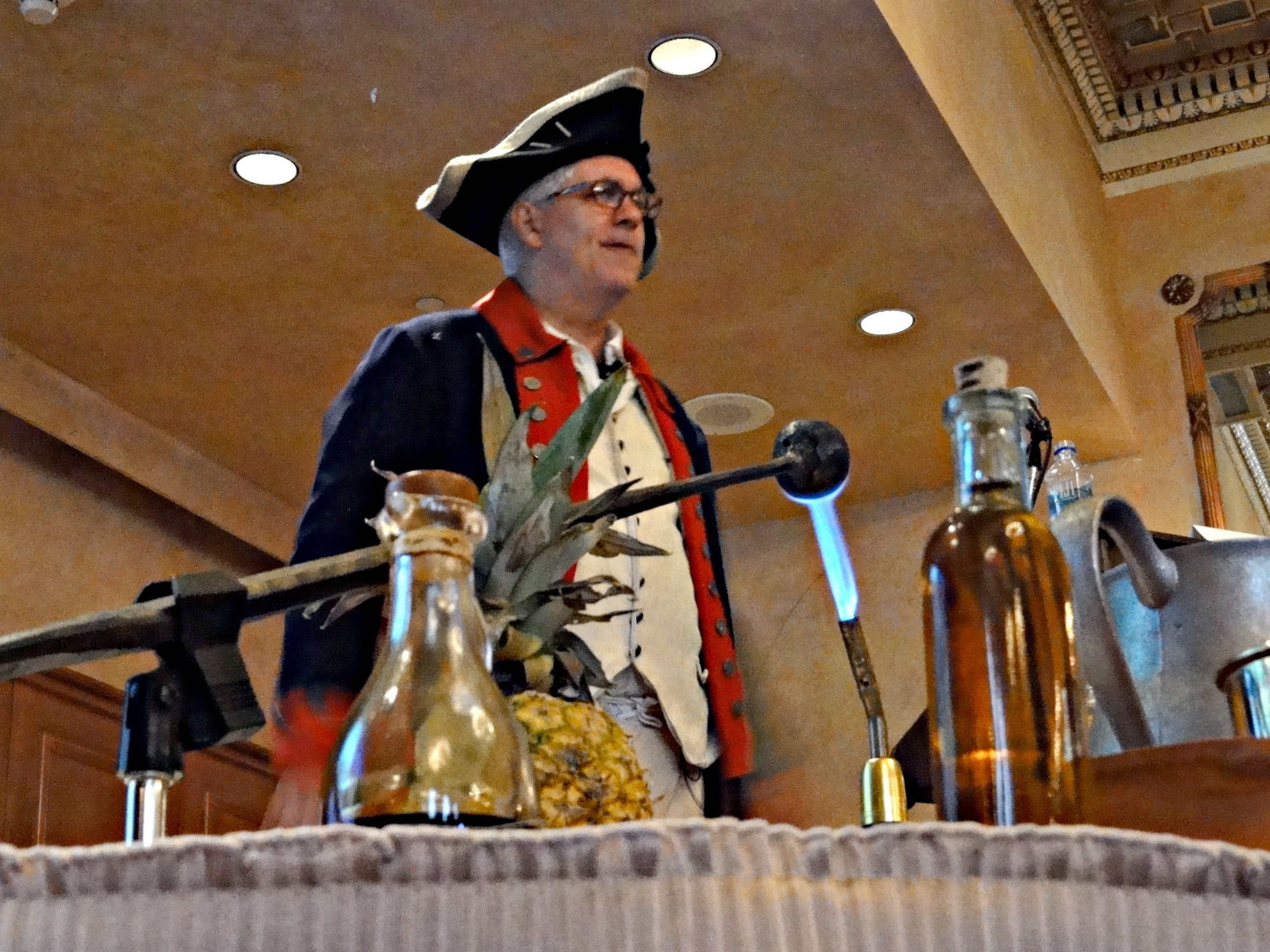
A loggerhead being heated. Once red-hot, it would be plunged into the drink.

The flip, from which the modern cocktail evolved, first originated 17th century. It originated in colonial America and was described as "a sort of Sailor's Drink". It was very popular in both English and American taverns until the 19th century. There were many variations, as each tavern had its own recipe. It was principally a mulled ale, with the addition of rum or brandy, sugar, spices—almost always grated nutmeg—and fresh eggs. Some notable variations existed, such as the Sailor's Flip, which had no ale, or the Egg-Hot, which had no spirits.

The drink was warmed and thus mulled by first placing the beer in a vessel near a fire. Once near boiling, the hot ale was transferred to a jug and combined with the eggs and other ingredients. Another jug was used to pour the liquid back and forth until it became smooth and creamy. Finally, the drink was served in a cup or tankard and finished using a dedicated iron fireplace poker called a flipdog, hottle, or toddy rod. The rod would be heated by the fire until red-hot and then plunged into the cup of flip. The hot iron further mulled and frothed the drink, imparting a slightly bitter, burned taste.

A loggerhead was originally used as the hot-rod before the purpose-built flipdog or toddy rod evolved from it. It was a narrow piece of iron about three feet long with a slightly bulbous head about the size of a small onion, used for heating tar or pitch to make it pliable.

Flip is mentioned in Charles Dickens's Barnaby Rudge, where the regulars at the Maypole Tavern drink it around the fire and in Our Mutual Friend when describing the Six Jolly Fellowship Porters tavern.

The drink is central to an annual winter woodchopping event in Harriet Beecher-Stowe's 1869 novel Oldtown Folks, which illustrates New England culture, specifically Massachusetts, around 1820. A minor lumberjack character, "Old Heber Atwood," sips from a mug of flip, and the Deacon sips from a tumbler. The flip is served to all the townspeople, alongside cake and cheese.

A recipe of the old drink, as written in The Cook's Oracle (1822):

To make a quart of Flip:— Put the Ale on the fire to warm, — and beat up three or four Eggs with four ounces of moist Sugar, a teaspoonful of grated Nutmeg or Ginger, and a quartern of good old Rum or Brandy.
When the Ale is near to boil, put it into one pitcher, and the Rum and Eggs, into another;— turn it from one pitcher to another till it is as smooth as Cream.

The first account of a cold flip was in 1874 in E.A. Simmons's book The American Bar-Tender; or, The Art and Mystery of Mixing Drinks, followed by Jerry Thomas's guide in 1887.

== Flip recipes from Jerry Thomas (1887) ==
The following flip recipes appear in Jerry Thomas 1887.

- Cold Brandy Flip – brandy, water, egg, sugar, grated nutmeg
- Cold Rum Flip – substitute Jamaica rum
- Cold Gin Flip – substitute Holland gin
- Cold Whiskey Flip – substitute Bourbon or rye whiskey
- Port Wine Flip – substitute port wine
- Sherry Wine Flip – substitute sherry
- Hot Brandy Flip – brandy, sugar, egg yolk, hot water, grated nutmeg
- Hot Rum Flip – substitute Jamaica rum
- Hot Whiskey Flip – substitute whiskey
- Hot Gin Flip – substitute Holland gin
- Hot English Rum Flip – ale, aged rum, raw eggs, sugar, grated nutmeg or ginger
- Hot English Ale Flip – same as Rum Flip, without rum and less egg white
- Sleeper – aged rum, sugar, egg, water, cloves, coriander, lemon
