= Loggerhead (tool) =

Long-handled tool with a heated bulb

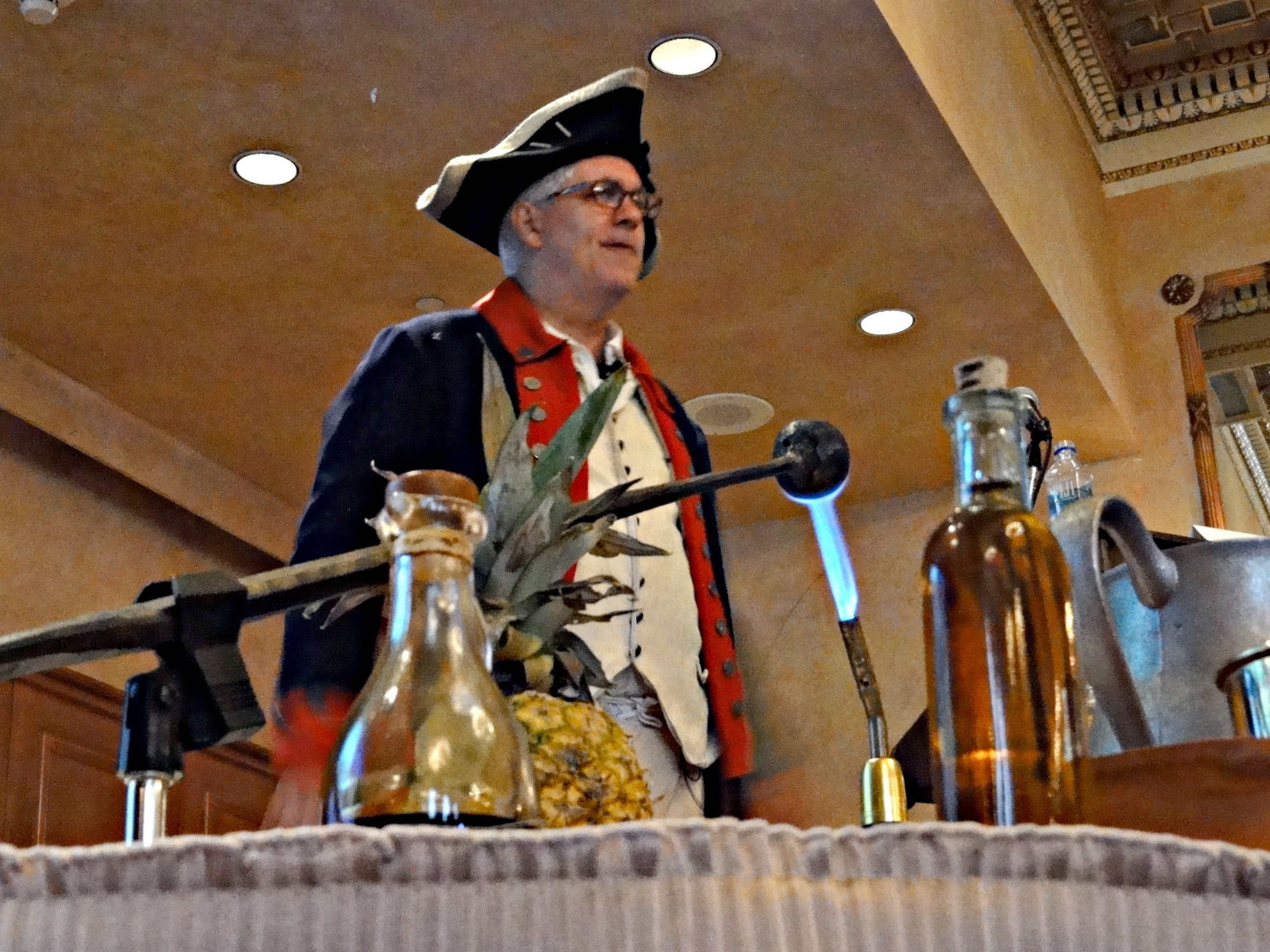
A loggerhead tool bulb that is being heated with a propane torch flame.

A loggerhead is a type of tool consisting of a ball or bulb (for example, of iron) which would be heated up attached to a long handle. Used to heat or melt solids and solidified liquids, it was formerly a fairly common tool. For example, loggerheads were used by shipbuilders to melt pitch. Although not its intended purpose, it was also used in American taverns in the 17th and 18th centuries in the making of the then popular mixed drink flip.
