= ARISE Detroit! =

Coalition of community groups

ARISE Detroit! is a coalition of community groups in Detroit, banding together in the hopes of making a bigger impact than they each can accomplish separately. ARISE is an acronym for Activating Resources and Inspiring Service and Empowerment.

The coalition is a way to link together the hundreds of programs and agencies working to combat child and family issues – violence, parenting, illiteracy, education, drug abuse, community development, youth mentoring, etc. — to produce more resources, more volunteers and more help for the people who need it. ARISE Detroit! intends to create a massive community wide movement, supported by people, non-profit groups, the media and individuals, to offer hope and let people know that they can play a personal role in improving their communities.

The project began with a $300,000 grant from the Skillman Foundation, one of its founding partners. The coalition grew out of brainstorming sessions the foundation began hosting after Bill Cosby's January 2005 town meeting where he challenged black Detroiters to stop blaming white people for problems they could solve themselves.

ARISE Detroit! will ask its volunteers to find a place with an existing service agency that will make use of their talents. That could mean mentoring, tutoring, advising on health matters, combating illiteracy, teaching financial literacy, resolving conflicts, or supporting recreation centers. ARISE Detroit! will also help connect city residents who need help with the organizations that provide it.

== Founding Partners ==
- ACCESS
- African-American Family Magazine
- Alternatives for Girls
- Anderson Memorial Church/Project Hope
- Art of Leadership
- Black Family Development
- Children's Aid Society
- City Year Detroit
- Communities in Schools
- DAPCEP
- Detroit Free Press
- Detroit Parent Network
- Detroit Youth Foundation
- Hope United Methodist Church
- Legacy Associates Foundation
- Marshall Alexander Youth Organization
- Metro Parent Publishing Group
- Neighborhood Services Organization/Youth Initiative Project
- ProLiteracy Detroit
- The Skillman Foundation
- Southwest Solutions
- Youth Sports and Recreation Commission
