= Arise India =

Arise India Private Limited
- Company type: Private
- Industry: Consumer Electronics
- Founded: 1995
- Founders: Avinash Jain; Amit Jain
- Headquarters: Delhi, India
- Area served: India
- Key people: Avinash Jain (Chairman); Amit Jain(CEO)
- Products: LED TV, Home Appliances, Kitchen Appliances, Inverters & batteries, Pumps
- Number of employees: 800
- Website: arisestore.in

Arise India Ltd. is a manufacturer of electrical goods based in Delhi, India and provides a range of consumer electronics. The company deals with a variety of products including televisions, inverters (UPS and sinewave), water pumps (monobloc, submersible, and centrifugal), home and kitchen appliances (mixer grinder, induction cook tops, juicer mixer grinders, water heaters, and smart Android based televisions.

Avinash Jain is the chairman and MD of the company. He along with his brother Amit Jain have led the development of the company. Arise India Ltd. has over 3000 employees and 45 offices in India. The corporate office is located in Dwarka, Delhi and there are two specialized manufacturing plants in Haryana and Himachal Pradesh.

== History ==
The company originated as a small hardware store in Palam, Delhi in May 1984 by brothers Avinash and Amit Jain and was then known as "Jain Brothers". Arise established its first manufacturing workshop in 1992 in Sonipat, Haryana. It specializes in monoblocs and submersibles pump sets and batteries. Another unit at Kala Amb, Himachal Pradesh manufactures UPS systems, inverters and gas and electric geysers.

The company started its initial operations from Palam, Delhi-NCR in 1992 and later in the year 1995 Arise India brand name was adopted when company started manufacturing inverters on a large scale. Arise India further invested in manufacturing water pumps in 1999. Savoring primary success with the launch of these products, the company entered into the electronics market in 2003 by manufacturing a wide range of mobile phones for both general and luxury segments. The company has since expanded into other categories of consumer electronics such as LED TVs and kitchen/home appliances.

After collaborating with e-commerce websites like Snapdeal and Flipkart, Arise India launched its e-commerce platform. The company subsequently expanded into manufacturing consumer electronics including home and kitchen appliances, smart phones, and smart televisions. The Arise Divine LED TV for Android is a smart TV powered by the Android Jellybean 4.2 OS.

== Sponsorship ==
Arise India has sponsored several cricket series:

- ASIA CUP 2014 – Title Sponsor
- IPL KXIP 2014 – Associate Sponsor
- IPL KXIP 2013 – Principal Sponsor
- Bilateral Series – India – NZ, India – SA, India – WI

== Charity work ==
Arise India started two social welfare charities: Sweet Home, an orphanage established in 1997 in Tura Mundi, New Delhi, and Sangam, a children's development charity in India.
