= Arise (Zara McFarlane album) =

Studio album by Zara McFarlane
- Released: 29 September 2017
- Length: 46:01
- Label: Brownswood

Zara McFarlane chronology
If You Knew Her (2014)	Arise (2017)	Songs of an Unknown Tongue (2020)

Professional ratings
Aggregate scores
Source	Rating
Metacritic	87/100
Review scores
Source	Rating
AllMusic	4.5/5 stars
All About Jazz	4.5/5 stars
Clash	8/10
Evening Standard	4/5 stars
The Guardian	4/5 stars
The Sydney Morning Herald	4/5 stars
Tom Hull	B+
Uncut	8/10

Arise is the third studio album by British singer-songwriter Zara McFarlane. It was released on 29 September 2017 through Brownswood Recordings.

== Accolades ==
Publication	Accolade	Rank	Ref.
AllMusic	Best of 2017	N/A	
Bandcamp	Top 100 Albums of 2017	38	

== Track listing ==
No.	Title	Length
1.	"Ode to Kumina"	1:02
2.	"Pride"	4:23
3.	"Fussin' and Fightin'"	5:05
4.	"Peace Begins Within"	4:09
5.	"Stoke the Fire"	4:28
6.	"Freedom Chain"	4:29
7.	"Riddim (Interlude)"	1:29
8.	"Allies or Enemies"	4:04
9.	"In Between Worlds"	4:24
10.	"Silhouette"	5:24
11.	"Fisherman"	3:59
12.	"Ode to Cyril"	3:05
