= Arise (band) =

Swedish death metal/thrash metal band

- Origin: Alingsås, Sweden
- Genres: Death metal, thrash metal
- Years active: 1996−present
- Labels: Spinefarm, Universal
- Members: Patrik Johansson; Sternberg; L-G Hakamo; Kaj; Daniel Bugno
- Past members: Patrik Skoglöw; Erik Ljungkvist

Arise is a Swedish death metal/thrash metal-band from Alingsås. Their name comes from the Sepultura album of the same name.

== History ==
Arise was founded in 1996 in Alingsås (outside of Gothenburg, Sweden) under another name, but became Arise in 1998 when their first demo was released. Their third demo, Abducted Intelligence, was recorded in Los Angered Recordings 2000 by Andy LaRoque, and became "demo recording of the month" in Swedish Close-Up Magazine. In 2001, the band signed to Spinefarm Records and released their first full-length record, The Godly Work of Art. The same year, the band was nominated to the Swedish Rockbjörnen award. Their second studio album, Kings of the Cloned Generation, was released in 2003. Universal Records bought Spinefarm Records during that time. Their third CD, The Beautiful New World, was recorded and released in 2005.

In December 2005, Patrik Skoglöw and Erik Ljungqvist parted ways with Daniel Bugno and L-G Jonasson due to "differences in opinion." Patrik Johansson (vocals), Sternberg (guitars), and Kaj (bass guitar) replaced them.

== Members ==
=== Current members ===
- Patrik Johansson - vocals
- Sternberg - guitar
- L-G Hakamo (formerly Jonasson) - guitar
- Kai L - bass
- Daniel Bugno - Drums

=== Former members ===
- Patrik Skoglöw - bass
- Erik Ljungqvist - vocals, guitar

== Discography ==
- Abducted Intelligence (Demo, 2000)
- The Godly Work of Art (CD, Spinefarm, 2001)
- Kings of the Cloned Generation (CD, Spinefarm, 2003)
- The Beautiful New World (CD, Universal, 2005)
- The Reckoning (CD, Regain, 2009)
