= Wu-Lu =

English musician (born 1990)

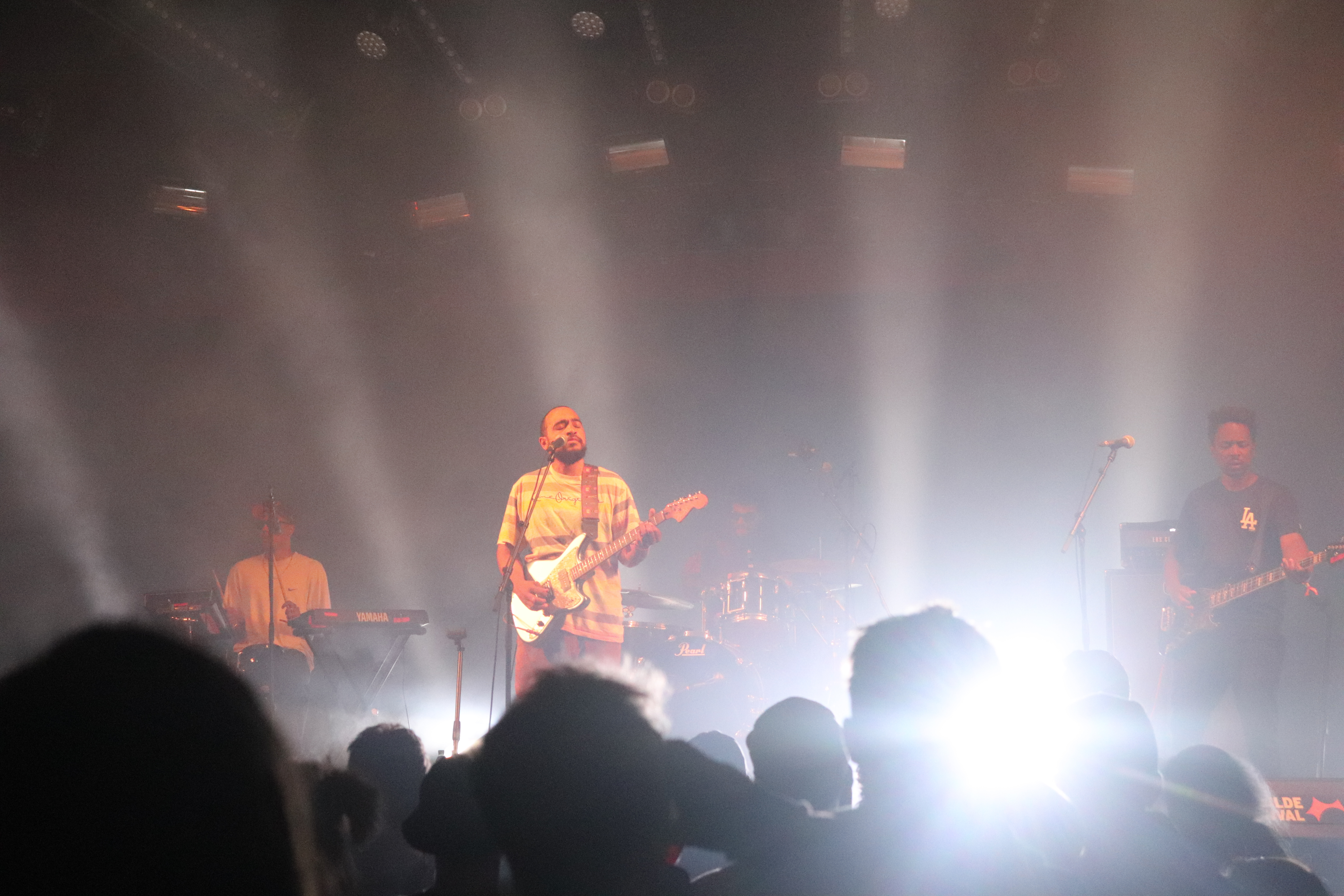
- Wu-Lu performing at Roskilde Festival 2023

Background information
- Born: Miles Romans-Hopcraft; 8 January 1990 (age 36) (Note: An interview with Romans-Hopcraft's twin brother Ben says he was (and thus both brothers were) 27 years old on 26 July 2017. Romans-Hopcraft shared new music on social media to celebrate his birthday on 8 January 2013.); Brixton, South London
- Genre: Punk rock
- Occupation: Musician
- Instruments: Vocals; bass
- Label: Warp

Miles Romans-Hopcraft, known professionally as Wu-Lu, is a musician from Brixton, South London. He has self-released one album and two EPs, and released his first album with Warp Records, Loggerhead, in 2022. His music covers a wide variety of genres, including several types of hip-hop and rock, though he is most commonly associated with punk rock.

== Early life ==
Miles Romans-Hopcraft was born on 8 January 1990 in Brixton, South London, and raised there. His mother, Hopal Romans, is a lecturer and contemporary dancer, and an alum of the Alvin Ailey American Dance School. His father, Robin Hopcraft, is a trumpeter and co-founder of the London reggae fusion band Soothsayers. Romans-Hopcraft has a twin brother, Ben, who plays in the bands Childhood, Warmduscher, and Insecure Men. Both twins guested with their father's band as preteens, with Miles playing bass which is his primary instrument.

Romans-Hopcraft listened to a large variety of music genres growing up, finding music from his parents, skateboard and graffiti culture, and video game soundtracks. These genres included hip-hop, grunge, alternative metal, pop-punk, and underground electronic genres such as drum and bass, UK garage, broken beat, grime, and dubstep. He discovered an interest in turntablism and sampling after watching the documentary film Scratch, and started DJing himself at age 13. He also produced beats with a drum machine, sampling records which his mother gifted him. Romans-Hopcraft's first musical projects were as a dubstep producer under the name TJ Mileage and as one half of an atmospheric hip hop duo called Monster Playground. He eventually settled on the name Wu-Lu, which he says reminded him of the Amharic word for water, "wuha", taking it because he didn't want to be "confined to any shape."

As a teenager, Romans-Hopcraft spent a lot of his time at a local skate park, picking up on the personalities of the older punks who frequented there. He said they took him under their wing, having an "'I don't give a shit' attitude" but "always look[ing] out for the youngsters." When he enrolled at the Brixton music and media school Raw Material, he took that attitude with him, tutoring other students in music production. After leaving the school, he worked at Alford House, a youth club in Kennington.

== Career ==
Romans-Hopcraft self-released his debut album as Wu-Lu, Ginga, in 2015. He also self-released two EPs, 2018's N.A.I.S. and 2019's S.U.F.O.S.

On 21 November 2021, Warp Records announced their signing of Wu-Lu and released his single "Broken Homes". On 4 May 2022, he announced his debut album with Warp, Loggerhead, which included "Broken Homes" and four other singles. The album was released on 8 July to a positive reception, receiving an 83/100 average score from review aggregator Metacritic. It was nominated for Best Punk Record at the 2023 Libera Awards and Best Independent Album at the 2023 AIM Independent Music Awards.

On 4 April 2024, Romans-Hopcraft announced his third EP, Learning to Swim on Empty, and released its lead single, "Daylight Song". The EP features contributions from poet and artist Rohan Ayinde and author Caleb Femi. The second single, a dub-influenced song called "Sinner", was released on 1 May. The EP was released on 17 May by Warp. It uses a recurring motif of water, drowning, and floating, with Romans-Hopcraft saying "Life throws us in the water all the time but always know that it's a myth that we can't swim – keep pushing."

On 20 May 2026, Romans-Hopcraft announced a collaborative nine-track EP with Poison Anna, Bakerz Dozen, which was released on 5 June by Warp.

== Personal life ==
As of 2021, Romans-Hopcraft was living in a Brixton flat with his brother Ben, around the corner from where he was born. He has multiple tattoos, including one of an executioner and one of Goku on his lower leg.

== Style ==
Wu-Lu is known to cover numerous musical styles through his work, and has been called "genre-agnostic". Songs of his have been described with such disparate genres as grunge, post-punk, dub, trip hop, alternative rock, drum and bass, folk, screamo, heavy metal, drill, jazz, garage, art punk, abstract hip-hop, skate punk, downtempo, lofi hip-hop, textural jazz, and plunderphonics. Wu-Lu said he didn't know what genre to refer to Loggerhead as, suggesting that "maybe the name Wu-Lu will become a genre in itself." He has often been connected to the South London jazz scene, due in part to his collaborations with jazz musicians Nubya Garcia and Zara McFarlane.

His lyrics touch on subjects including racism, gentrification, economic inequality, and mental health. He described his personal connection with these issues by calling his hometown of Brixton sugar cane being turned into white sugar, where "all the nutrients and joy are being refined out of it into something that is unhealthy." Wu-Lu's music has been noted for an adherence to the punk ethos he grew up with, sharing punk musicians' compulsion to speak truth to power.

=== Influences ===
Growing up, Romans-Hopcraft listened to artists such as Angie Stone and genres including reggae, dub, hip-hop, salsa, rare groove, and Afrobeat. When he got older, he got into heavy metal. He has also called DJ Shadow's 1996 album Endtroducing..... a "seminal discovery", and mentioned love for Mica Levi, Slauson Malone, Sorry, Pink Siifu, and London's jazz, hip-hop, and guitar music scenes.

== Accolades ==
Awards and nominations for Wu-Lu
Year	Organization	Award	Work	Status	Ref.
2022	AIM Independent Music Awards	Best Independent Track	"Broken Homes"	Nominated	
2022	UK Music Video Awards	Best Rock Video - Newcomer	"Blame"	Nominated	
2023	Libera Awards	Best Punk Record	Loggerhead	Nominated	
2023	AIM Independent Music Awards	Best Independent Album	Loggerhead	Nominated	

== Discography ==
=== Albums ===
- Ginga (2015, self-released)
- Loggerhead (2022, Warp Records)

=== EPs ===
- N.A.I.S. (2018, self-released)
- S.U.F.O.S. (2019, self-released)
- Learning to Swim on Empty (2024, Warp)
- Bakerz Dozen (with Poison Anna, 2026, Warp)

=== Singles ===
Wu-Lu singles
Year	Name	Album
2021	"South"	Loggerhead
2021	"Times"	Loggerhead
2021	"Broken Homes"	Loggerhead
2022	"Blame"	Loggerhead
2022	"Scrambled Tricks"	Loggerhead
2024	"Daylight Song"	Learning to Swim on Empty
2024	"Sinner"	Learning to Swim on Empty
