= Wulu railway station =

Railway station in Beijing, China

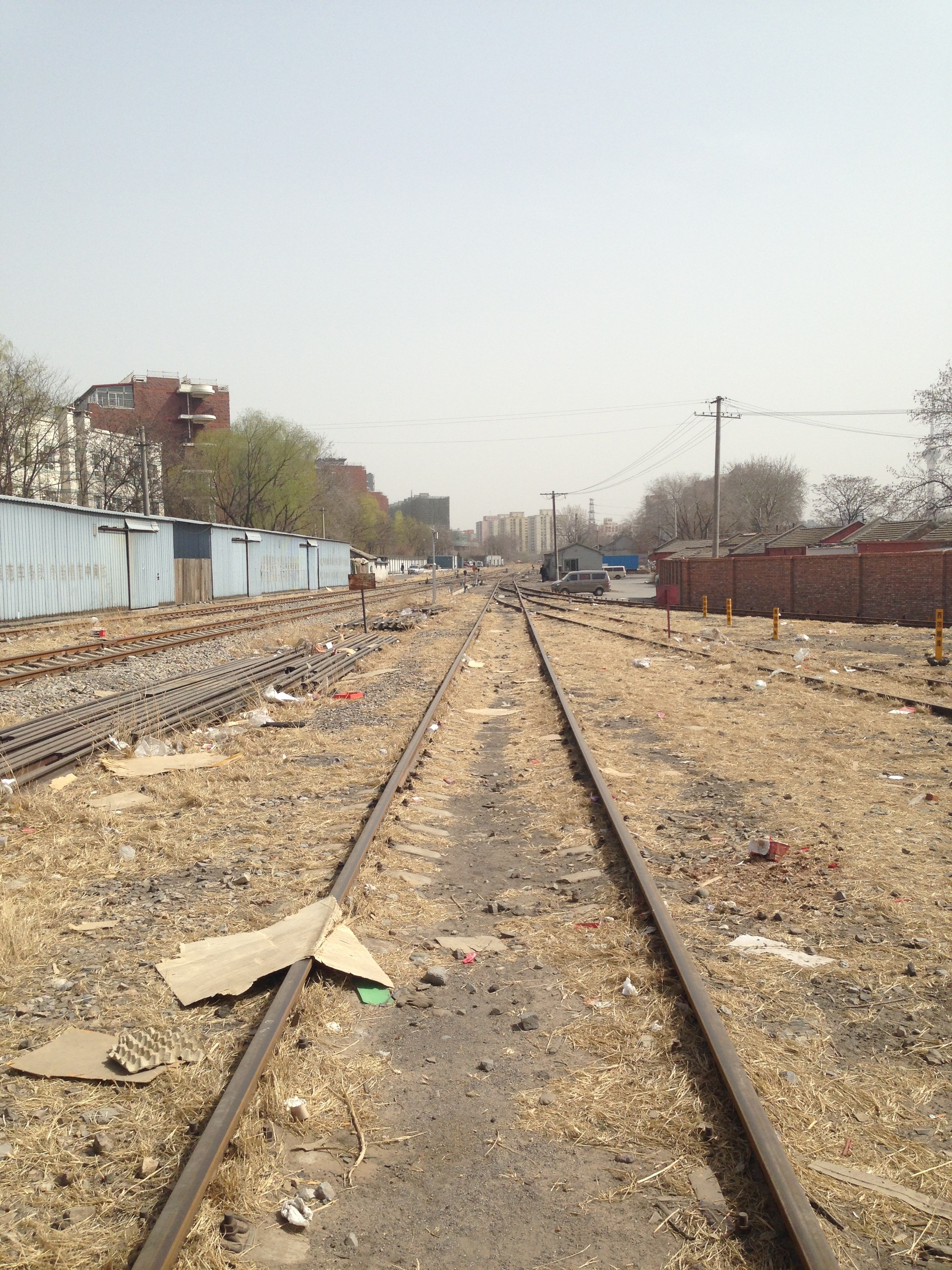
Looking east in Wulu railway station.

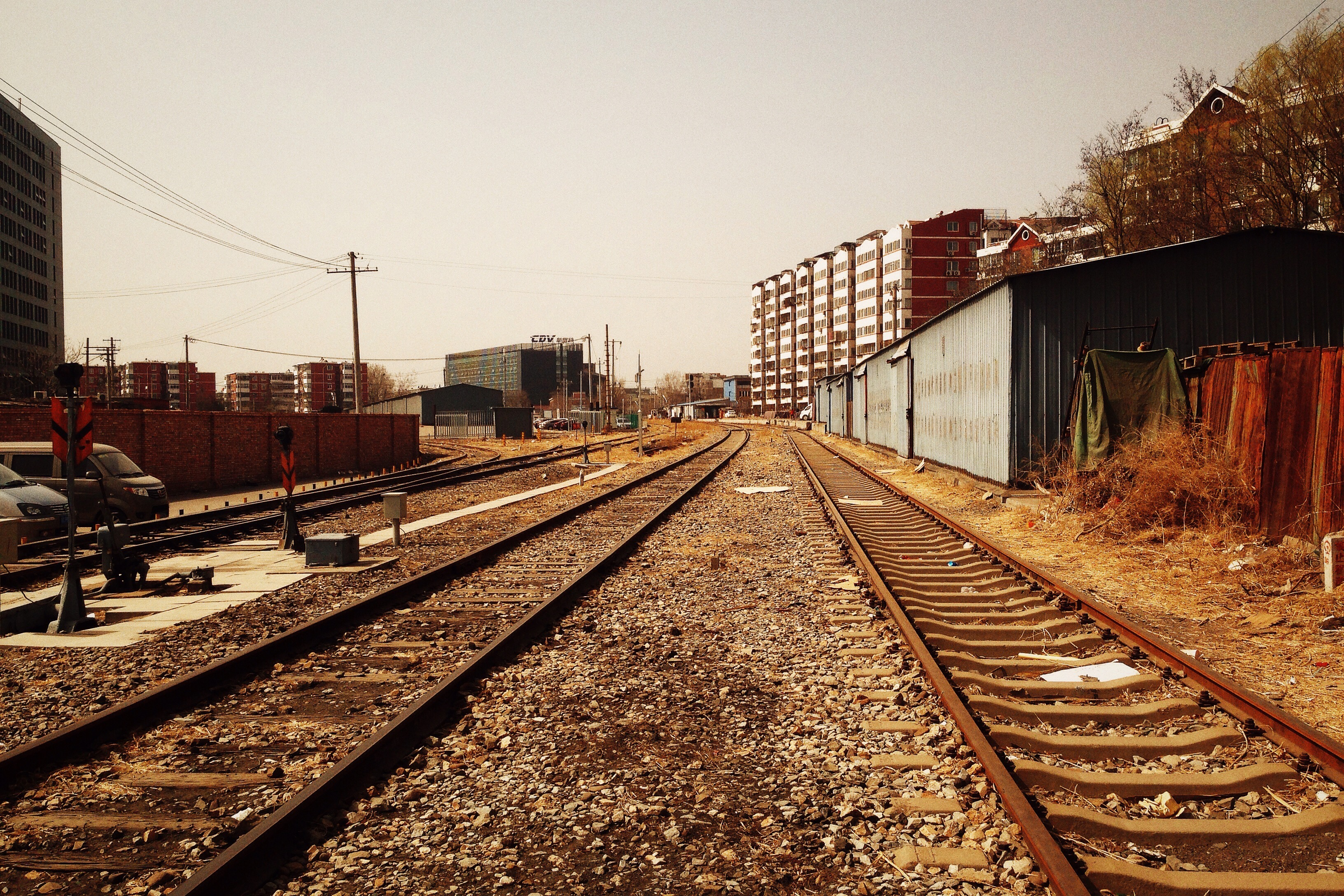
Looking west in Wulu railway station.

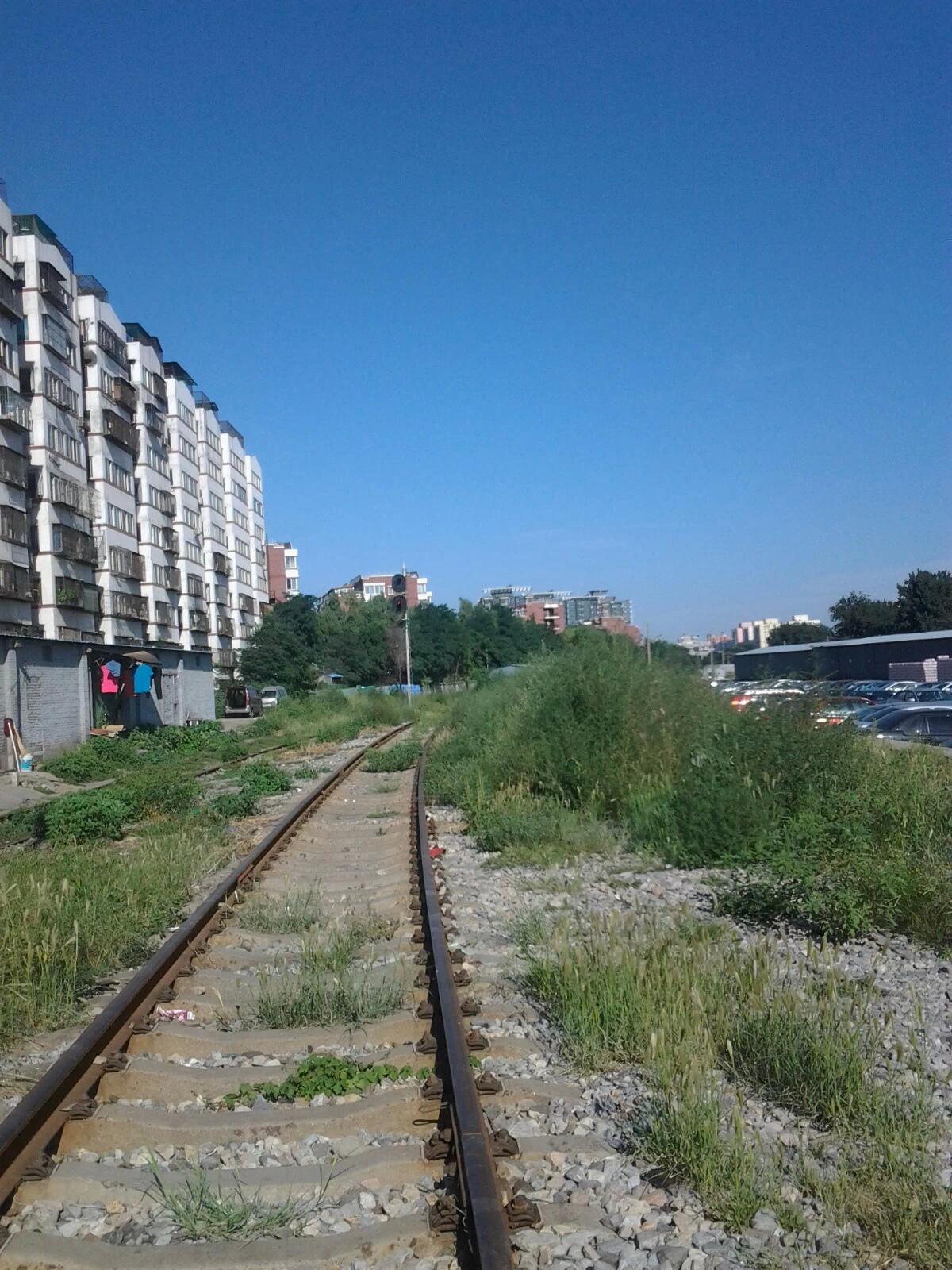
Wulu railway station, track #1 to the west.

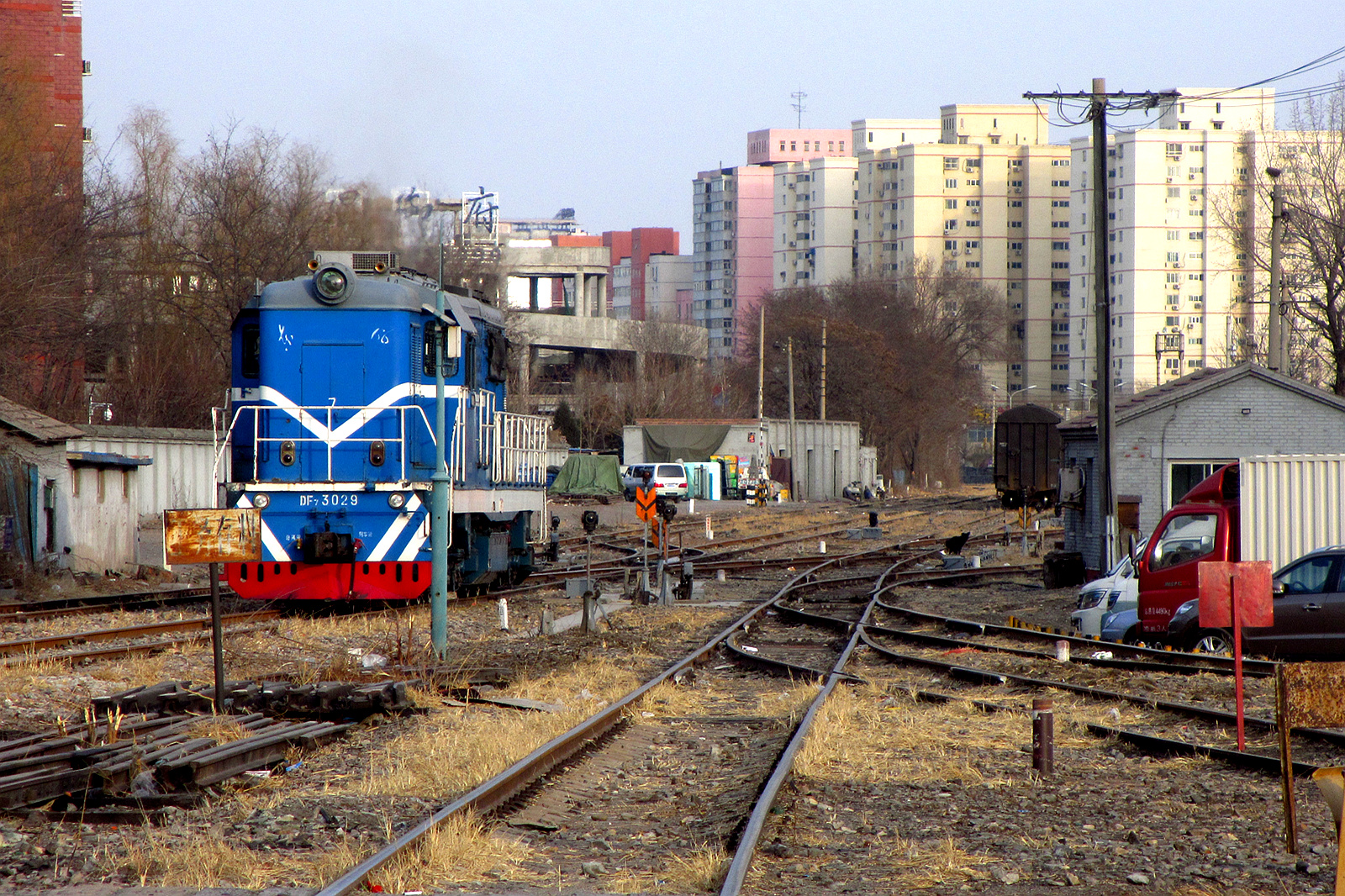
Locomotive DF7B #3029 idles in Wulu railway station.

Wulu railway station (Chinese: 五路火车站; pinyin: Wǔlù Huǒchēzhàn) is a railway station in Haidian District, Beijing, China. It is the east terminus of Jingmen Railway since 1971, when the line was abandoned between Wulu and Beijing North railway station. The station is about 52 kilometres (32 mi) from Muchengjian railway station, which is the west terminus of Jingmen Railway.

The Station is currently for freight traffic only, and only sees light traffic since early 2000s.

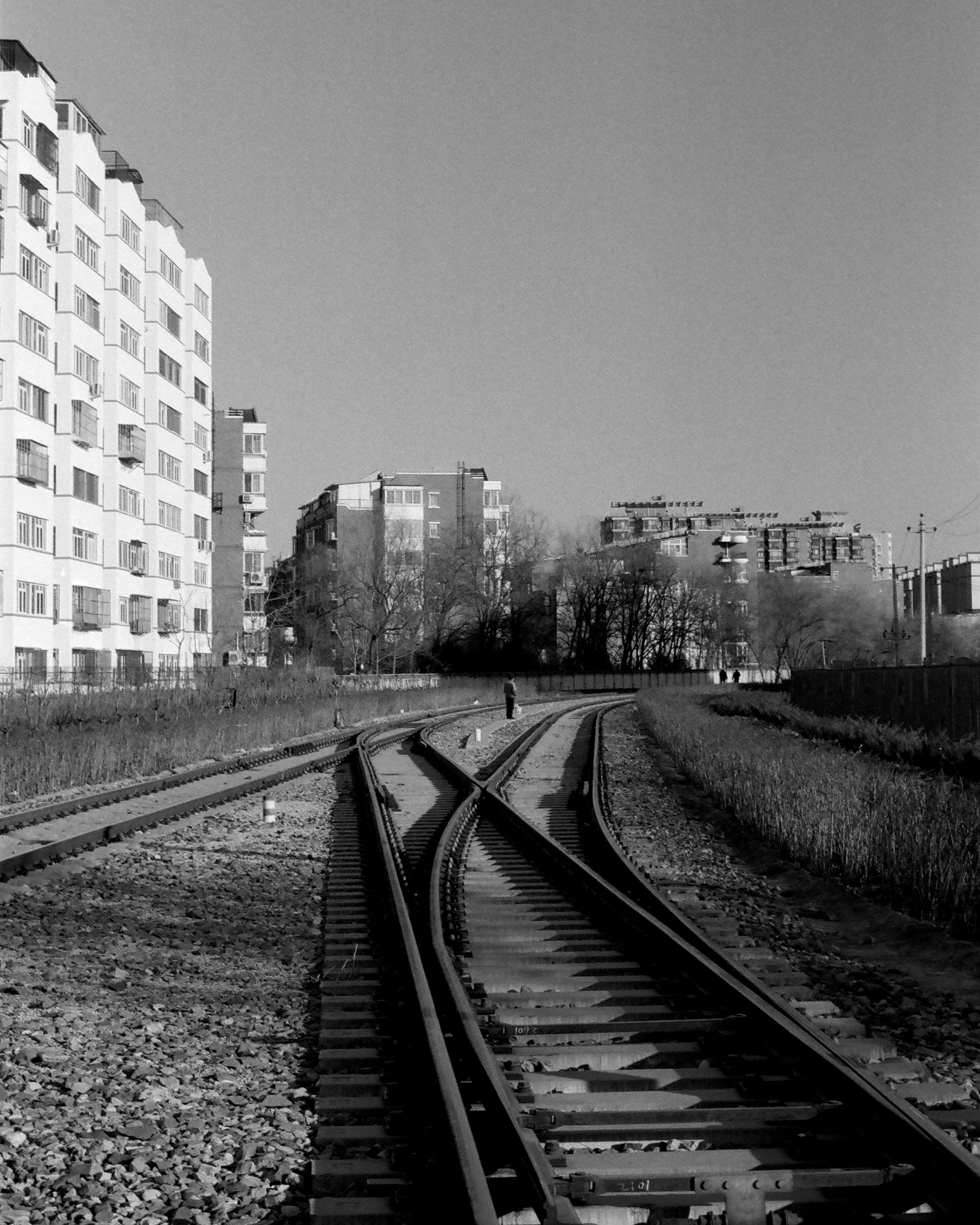
The site of Wulu Railway Station in December 2024. Photo was taken on Kentmere 400 black and white film.

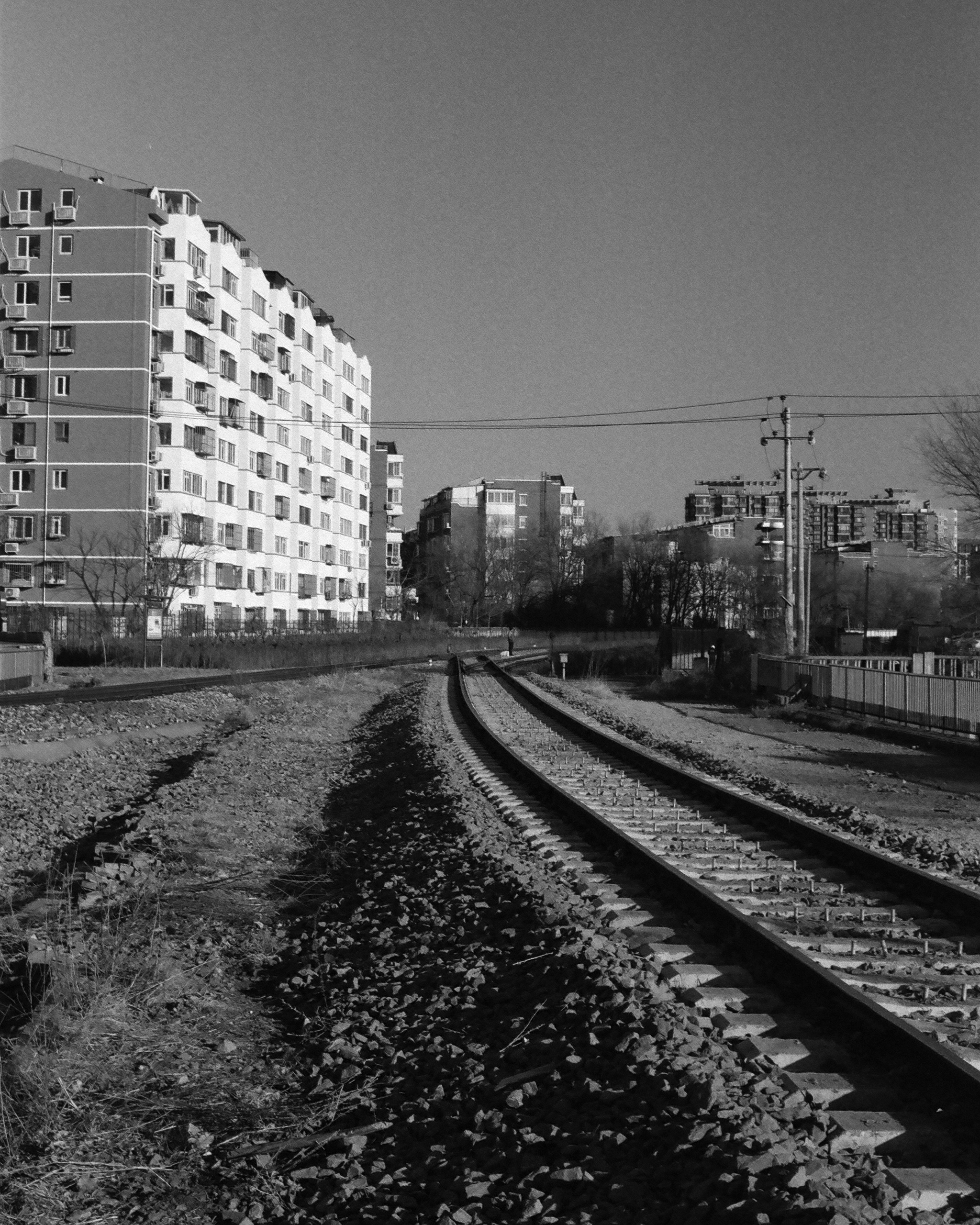
Single track approaching Wulu Railway Station from the west in December 2024. Visible to the left is a branch line leading away from Wulu towards the north. Photo was taken on Kentmere 400 black and white film.

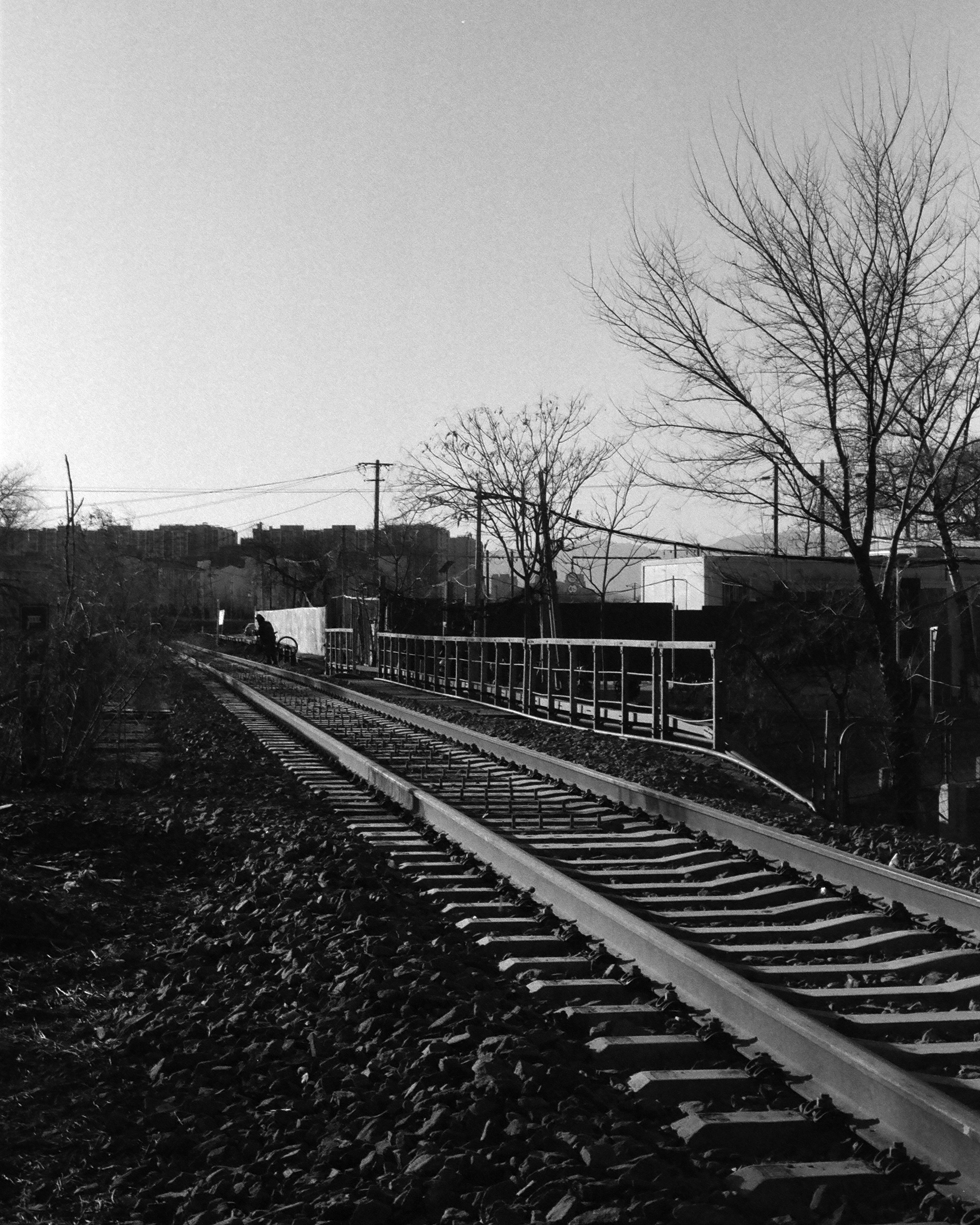
A railway bridge on the western approach to Wulu Railway Station, photographed in December 2024. Photo was taken on Kentmere 400 black and white film.

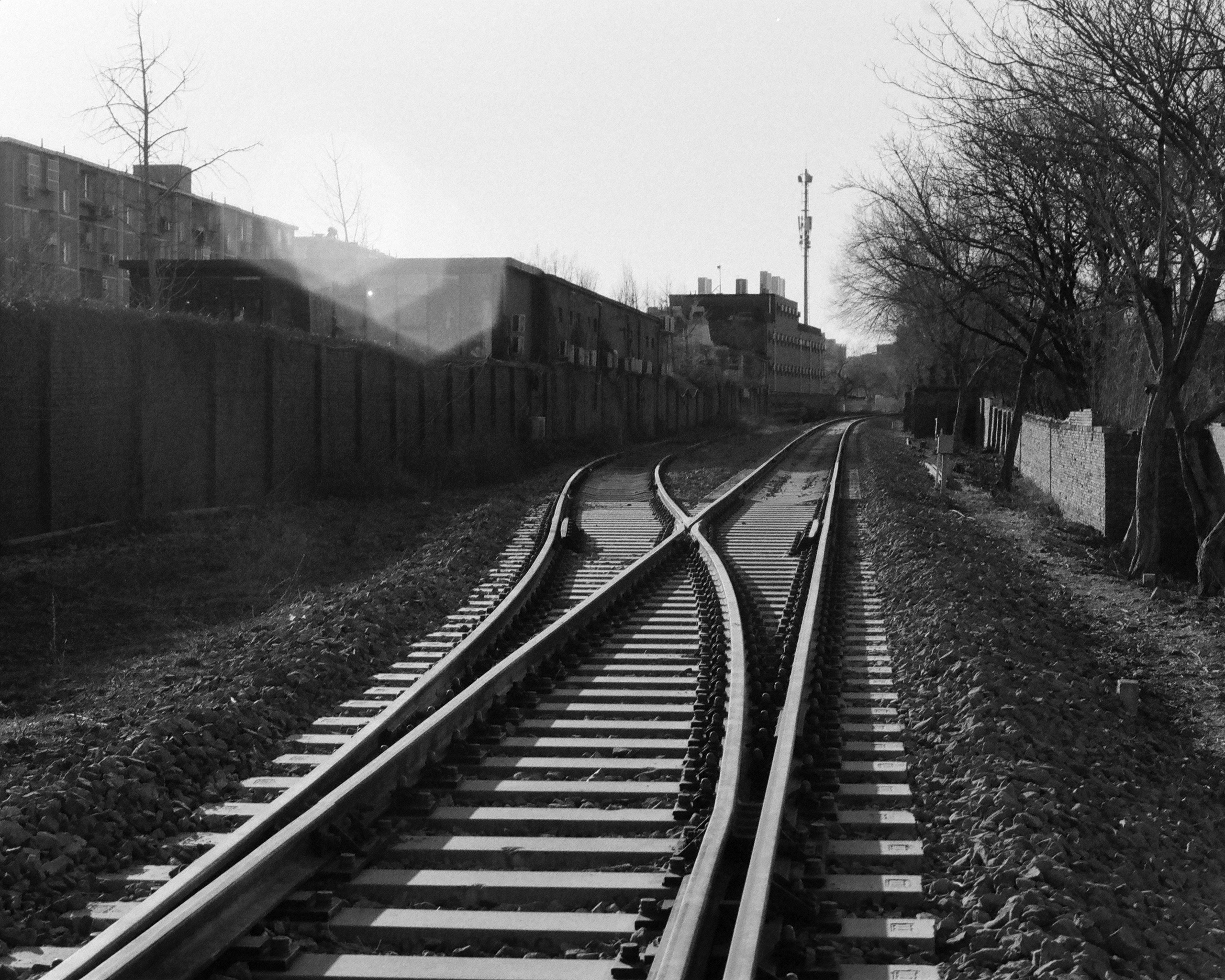
Railway tracks on the western approach to Wulu Railway Station in December 2024. Photo was taken on Kentmere 400 black and white film.

The station has a branch line which connects Xijiao Airport, which supposedly provides fuel supply for the airport. As a result, one may see tank cars in the station, although only on rare occasions.

The Wulu railway station is of walking distance from Haidian Wuluju station, a station on Beijing Subway Line 6. It is also in proximity of West 4th Ring Road.
