= Loggerhead (album) =

Studio album by Wu-Lu
- Released: 8 July 2022
- Studio: The Room, Hither Green
- Length: 41:26
- Label: Warp
- Producer: Wu-Lu, Amon

Wu-Lu chronology
S.U.F.O.S. (2019)	Loggerhead (2022)	Learning to Swim on Empty (2024)

Singles from Loggerhead
- 1. "South" Released: 7 February 2021; 2. "Times" Released: 14 April 2021; 3. "Broken Homes" Released: 21 November 2021; 4. "Blame" Released: 4 May 2022; 5. "Scrambled Tricks" Released: 21 June 2022

Loggerhead is the second album by South London musician Wu-Lu. It was released 8 July 2022 by Warp Records, and was his first with the label after releasing his debut album, Ginga, independently in 2015. Writing and recording for the album began in London, though mainly took place in Norway. Musical collaborators include featured vocalists Asha Lorenz from Sorry, Amon, Lex Amor, and Léa Sen, as well as Mica Levi, two members of the band Black Midi, and Wu-Lu's brother Benjamin Romans-Hopcraft.

Five singles were released prior to the album, each with a music video directed by either Denisha Anderson or Ethan + Tom. The album was received positively by critics and was nominated for multiple awards by the American Association of Independent Music and the UK's Association of Independent Music.

== Background ==
Loggerhead is Wu-Lu's first album released with Warp Records, who he signed with in 2021, having previously released the album Ginga and the EPs N.A.I.S. and S.U.F.O.S. independently in the 2010s.

== Recording ==
While hanging out in an empty pub in 2020, Wu-Lu determined the space would be good for recording in. He hired a mixing desk and invited his band to jam. In a session running through the night until 7 a.m. the next day, the band had written the riff for "Broken Homes". Continuing sessions led to noise complaints, so the band left London for a new space in Norway where they recorded 40 demos over a month. Twelve songs were selected from those demos, solidifying the track list for Loggerhead. The singles "South" and "Times" were all recorded at The Room in Hither Green, a studio and rehearsal space run by Wu-Lu and Kwake Bass.

== Release ==
Three songs from the album were released as singles prior to the album's announcement. The first, "South", features Lex Amor and was released 7 February 2021. "South" came with a music video directed by Denisha Anderson, and was described as having a "trip hop post-punk mix, with shades of Tricky and Martina Topley-Bird." "Times", featuring drums by Black Midi's Morgan Simpson and a music video directed by Ethan + Tom, came out on 14 April. "Broken Homes" was released on 21 November alongside the announcement of Wu-Lu's signing to Warp Records and came with another music video directed by Anderson.

The album was announced on 4 May 2022 for an 8 July release by Warp Records. The album's fourth single, "Blame", was released the same day with another Anderson-directed video. The music video also featured the album cut "Ten". The fifth single, "Scrambled Tricks", was released 21 June with a second music video by Ethan + Tom featuring Wu-Lu being attacked by a gang of clowns, with visuals reminiscent of A Clockwork Orange and The Texas Chain Saw Massacre.

== Reception ==
Loggerhead ratings
Aggregate scores
Source	Rating
AnyDecentMusic?	7.8/10
Metacritic	83/100
Review scores
Source	Rating
AllMusic	4.5/5 stars
Clash	8/10
Crack	8/10
DIY	3.5/5 stars
The Line of Best Fit	9/10
Loud and Quiet	9/10
Pitchfork	7.3/10
The Skinny	3/5 stars

According to the review aggregator Metacritic, Loggerhead received "universal acclaim" based on a weighted average score of 83 out of 100 from 6 critic scores.

=== Awards and nominations ===
Loggerhead awards and nominations
Year	Organisation	Award	Work	Status	Ref.
2022	AIM Independent Music Awards	Best Independent Track	"Broken Homes"	Nominated	
2022	UK Music Video Awards	Best Hip Hop / Grime / Rap Video – Newcomer	"Ten"	Won	
2022	UK Music Video Awards	Best Rock Video - Newcomer	"Blame"	Nominated	
2023	Libera Awards	Best Punk Record	Loggerhead	Nominated	
2023	AIM Independent Music Awards	Best Independent Album	Loggerhead	Nominated	

== Track listing ==
All tracks are written by Wu-Lu with additional writers noted. All tracks produced by Wu-Lu, with track 3 also produced by Amon.

Loggerhead track listing
No.	Title	Writer(s)	Length
1.	"Take Stage"		3:00
2.	"Night Pill" (featuring Asha Lorenz)	Lorenz	3:40
3.	"Facts" (featuring Amon)	Amon	3:26
4.	"Scrambled Tricks"		2:22
5.	"South" (featuring Lex Amor)	Lex Amor	3:54
6.	"Calo Paste" (featuring Léa Sen)		3:27
7.	"Slightly"		3:01
8.	"Blame"		3:03
9.	"Ten"		1:55
10.	"Road Trip"		4:00
11.	"Times"		5:19
12.	"Broken Homes"		4:19
Total length:			41:26

== Personnel ==
=== Musicians ===
- Wu-Lu – vocals, bass, producer, audio engineer
- Demae Chioma Wodu – vocals (1)
- Asha Lorenz – vocals (2)
- Amon – vocals (3)
- Lex Amor – vocals (5)
- Léa Sen – vocals (6)
- Ego Ella Uche – vocals (1, 7)
- Dr Unkle – vocals (4)
- Jordan Thompson Hadfield – guitar (2, 3, 10), synthesiser (12)
- Matthew Antony Kwasniewski-Kelvin – guitar (3, 4, 8, 9)
- Tagara Mhiza – bass (2, 4, 5, 7, 9, 12), vocals (4, 9)
- Jaega Francis McKenna-Gordon – drums (2–4, 7–9, 12)
- Blake Joshua Cameron Cascoe – drums (5, 8–10), vocals (9)
- Giles King-Ashong – drums (5)
- Morgan Simpson – drums (11)
- Jason – percussion (2, 12)
- Raven Bush – strings (1, 6)
- Mica Levi – strings (6)

=== Technical ===
- Wu-Lu – producer, audio engineer (1–8, 10–12)
- Dilip Harris – mixing
- Heba Kadry – mastering
- Max Lyons–Depont – audio engineer (1–8, 10–12)
- Andy Ramsay – audio engineer (9)
- Benjamin Romans-Hopcraft – arranger (12)

== Charts ==
Chart performance for Loggerhead
Chart (2022)	Peak position
Scottish Albums (OCC)	49
UK Independent Albums (OCC)	8
