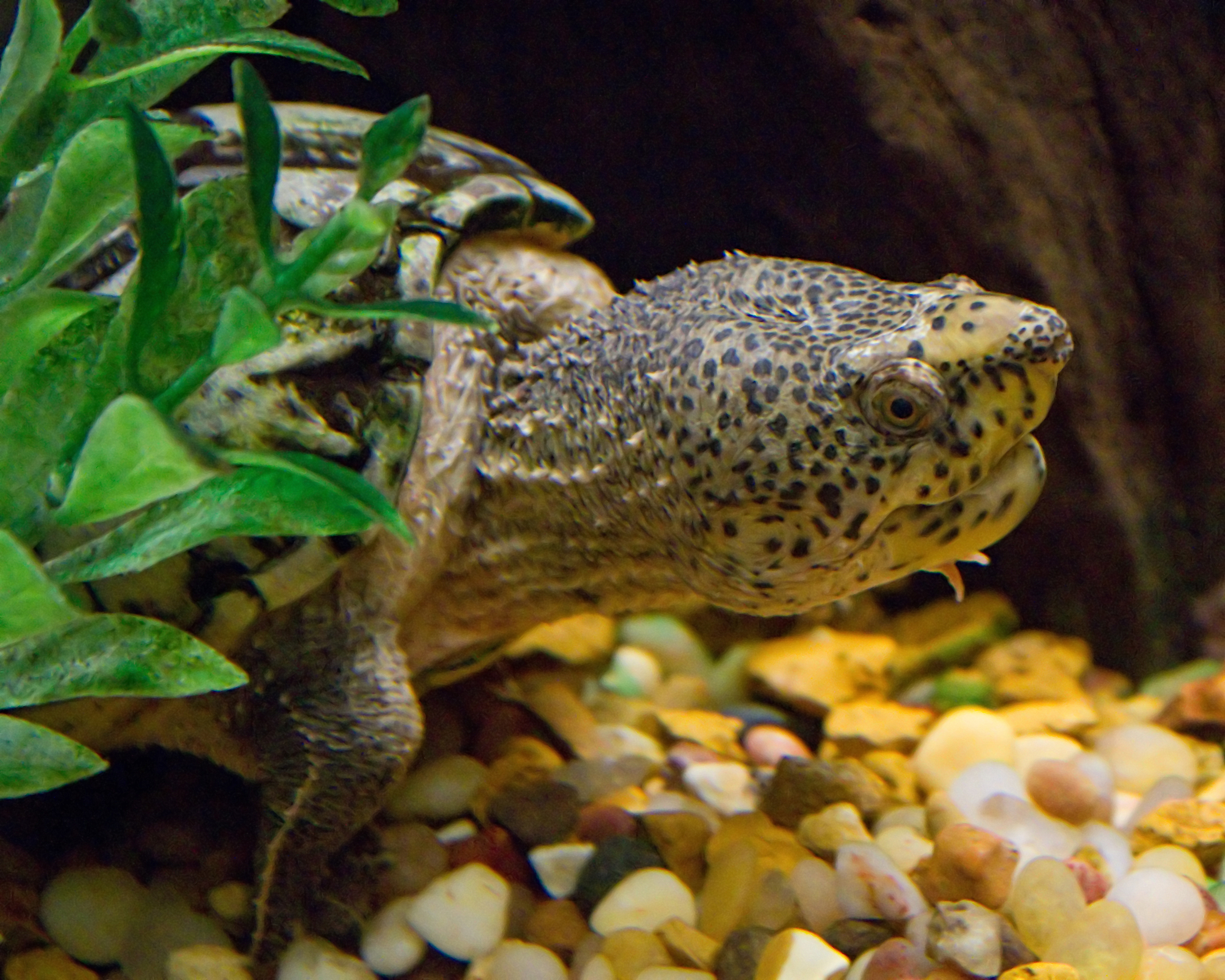
- Adult, in captivity
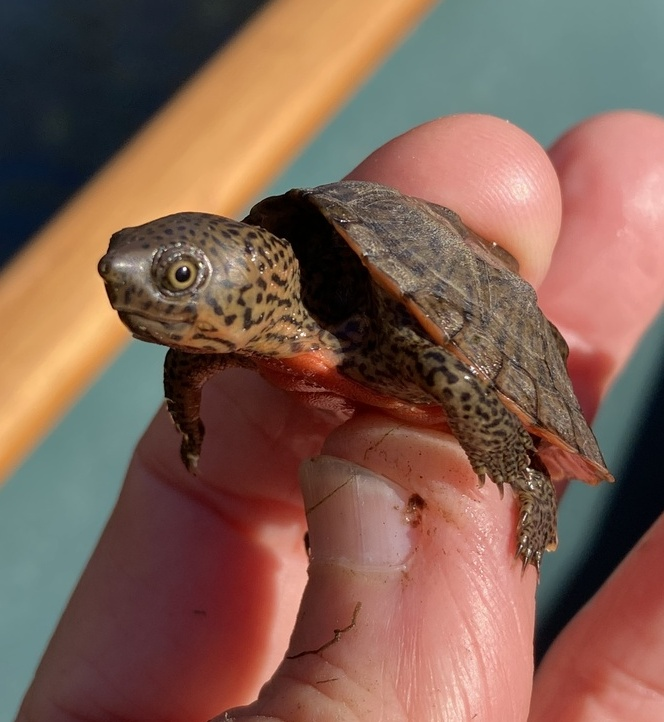
- Young turtle, Florida

Conservation status
- Least Concern (IUCN 3.1)

Scientific classification
- Kingdom: Animalia
- Phylum: Chordata
- Class: Reptilia
- Order: Testudines
- Suborder: Cryptodira
- Family: Kinosternidae
- Genus: Sternotherus
- Species: S. minor

Binomial name
- Sternotherus minor (Agassiz, 1857)

Synonyms
- List: Goniochelys minor Agassiz, 1857; Aromochelys minor — Strauch, 1862; Sternotherus minor — Stejneger, 1923; Sternotherus carinatus minor — Carr, 1952; Sternotherus minor minor — Tinkle & Webb, 1955; Sternothaerus minor minor — Tinkle, 1958; Sternotheraerus minor minor — Wharton & Howard, 1971; Kinosternon minor — Iverson, Ernst, Gotte & Lovich, 1989; Kinosternon minor minor — Ernst & R. Barbour, 1989

= Loggerhead musk turtle =

Species of turtle

The loggerhead musk turtle (Sternotherus minor) is a species of turtle in the family Kinosternidae. This turtle has a large head which has a light-colored background with dark spots or stripes present on the head and neck. The average size of an adult loggerhead musk turtle is about 3–5 in (7.6–12.7 cm) in straight carapace length.

The species is native to the southern United States, being found in rivers, wetlands, and streams in the states of Alabama, Florida, and Georgia. The diet of an adult loggerhead musk turtle consists mostly of clams and snails.

As of 2016 the conservation status of the loggerhead musk turtle is "Least Concern", and its common threats include habitat loss and human interactions such as car or boating accidents.

== Description ==
The loggerhead musk turtle gets its common name from its unusually large head, compared to the common musk turtle (Sternotherus odoratus).

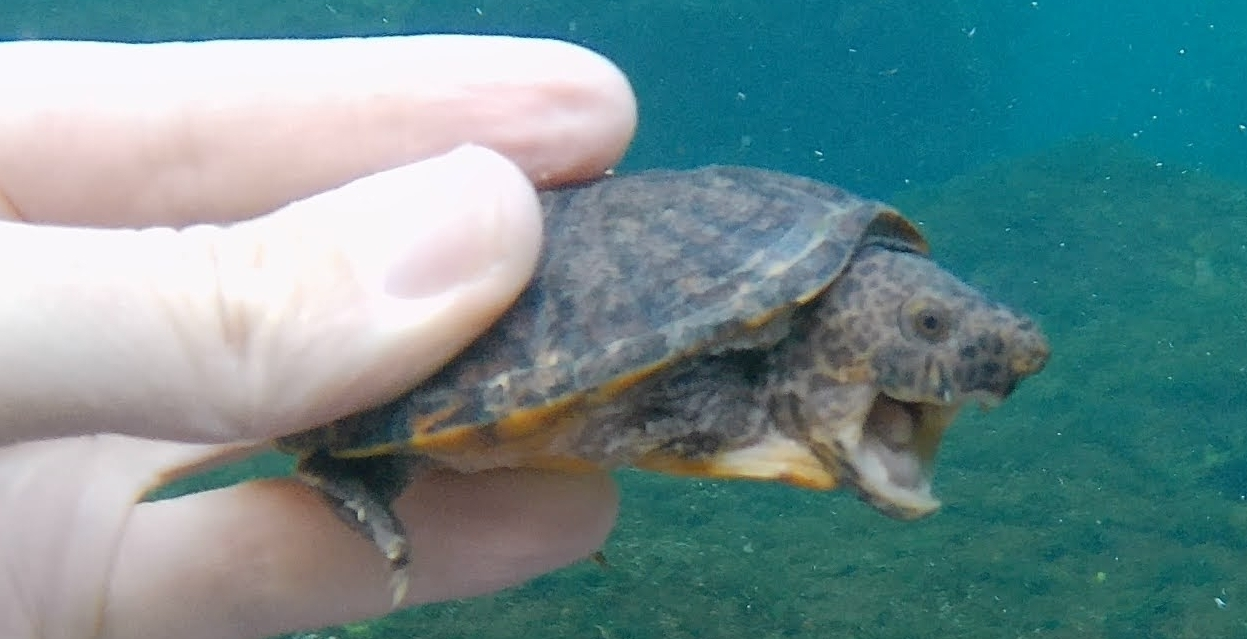
Adult underwater, Florida

Its head has a light-colored background with dark spots or stripes. Hatchlings are about 1 inch (2.5 cm) in straight carapace length and grow up to around 3 to 5 inches (about 8 to 13 cm) by adulthood. Juveniles have three keels on the carapace that usually disappear by adulthood. The loggerhead musk turtle has barbels present on the chin only, not on the throat.

=== Subspecies ===
There are two subspecies of Sternotherus minor: Sternotherus minor minor and Sternotherus minor peltifer, also known as the loggerhead musk turtle and the stripe-necked musk turtle, respectively. The two subspecies are visibly different, with S. m. minor having a darker tan colored head covered with dark spots and three keels on its carapace and S. m. peltifer having a yellow colored head with some dark spots, but mostly dark stripes and a ridged carapace. S. m. minor are generally a little larger in size than S. m. peltifer ranging from 3 to 5.625 inches (7.5 to 14.5 cm) in carapace length, while S. m. peltifer range from 3 to 4.625 inches (7.5 to 11.7 cm).

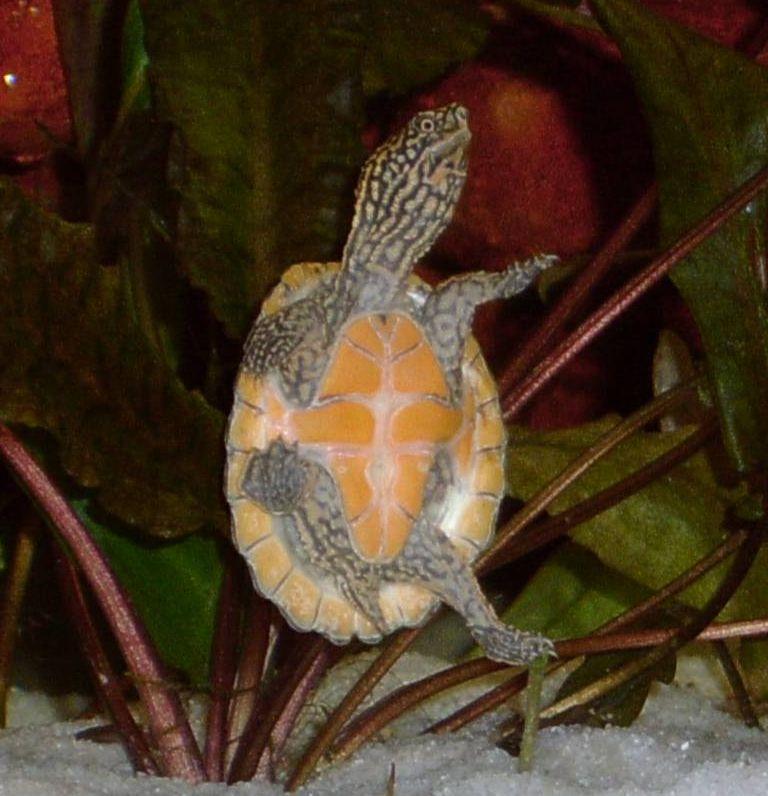
Sternotherus minor peltifer

== Geographic distribution ==
S. minor is found in freshwaters of Alabama, Florida, and Georgia.It occurs in the Ogeechee, Altamaha, and Apalachicola river systems. It shares parts of its range in southeast Alabama, west Florida, and west Georgia with the stripeneck musk turtle (Sternotherus peltifer), and both species can be found in rivers such as the Choctawhatchee and Perdido.

== Habitat ==
S. minor lives in clean freshwater habitats such as springs, streams, runs, wetlands, ponds, and rivers.

== Behaviour ==
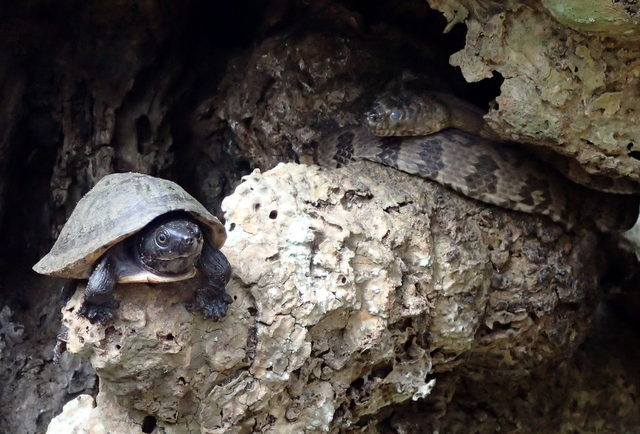
Next to a brown water snake, Florida

It spends most of its time in the water with less time spent basking out in the sun than is observed in other species.

=== Feeding ===
The diet of the loggerhead musk turtle changes as it grows. Younger turtles have a more varied diet, eating insects, snails, crayfish, and clams while adults eat mostly snails and clams since adults are larger.

The loggerhead musk turtle forages in streams with sandy or vegetated bottoms with varying speeds of currents.

== Reproduction ==
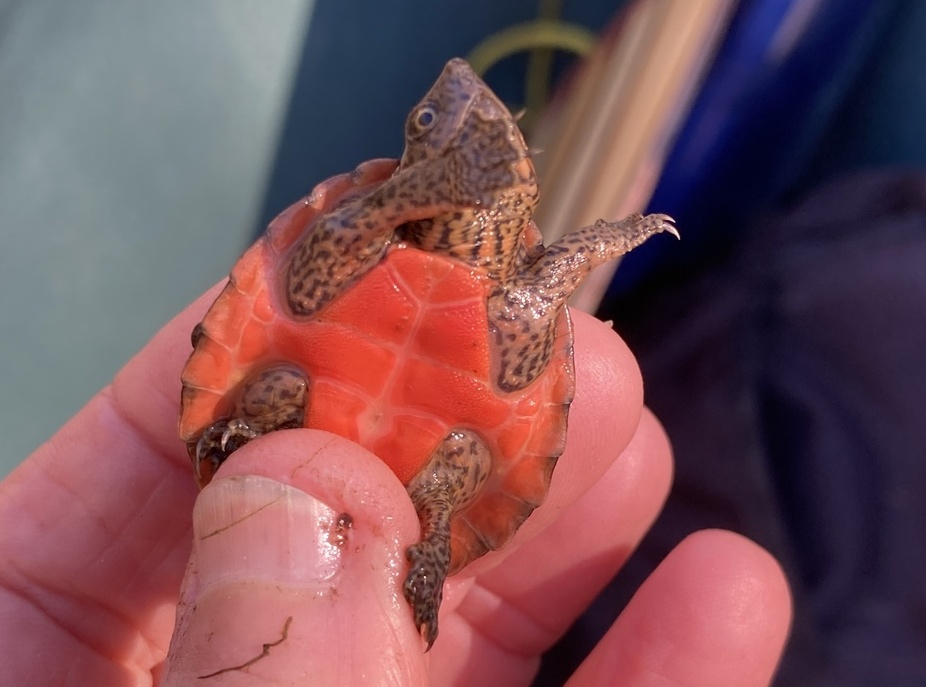
Young turtle, Florida

S. minor is oviparous. Between June and August, females can lay up to five clutches with one to four eggs per clutch. Larger females tend to have larger eggs and more eggs per clutch. Females lay their eggs on the shore, in holes 8–15 cm (3.1–5.9 in) deep. Hatchlings typically have a carapace length of 2.47 cm (0.97 in).

=== Mating behavior ===
In the wild, mating takes place underwater in shaded areas. Males exhibit several different behaviors during the mating process including cloacal sniffing, bridge sniffing, mounting, following the female, biting, moving the head from one side to the other, and interlocking of tails.

== Conservation and threats ==
The IUCN has listed the loggerhead musk turtle as an animal of least concern.

This turtle is prey to alligator snapping turtles, cottonmouths and American alligators. Humans are also known to be predators. Juvenile loggerhead musk turtles are more vulnerable due to their small size. Animals including raccoons and crows are often found feeding on the eggs of loggerhead musk turtles.

Some common threats to this turtle include habitat loss, negative interactions with humans, such as being killed by cars or boats or dying after biting fish hooks, and indirect threats such as threats to their food sources. While this turtle is vulnerable to habitat loss, many waterways within its range are protected by Florida state law. Florida lists it as a protected species.

== Gallery ==
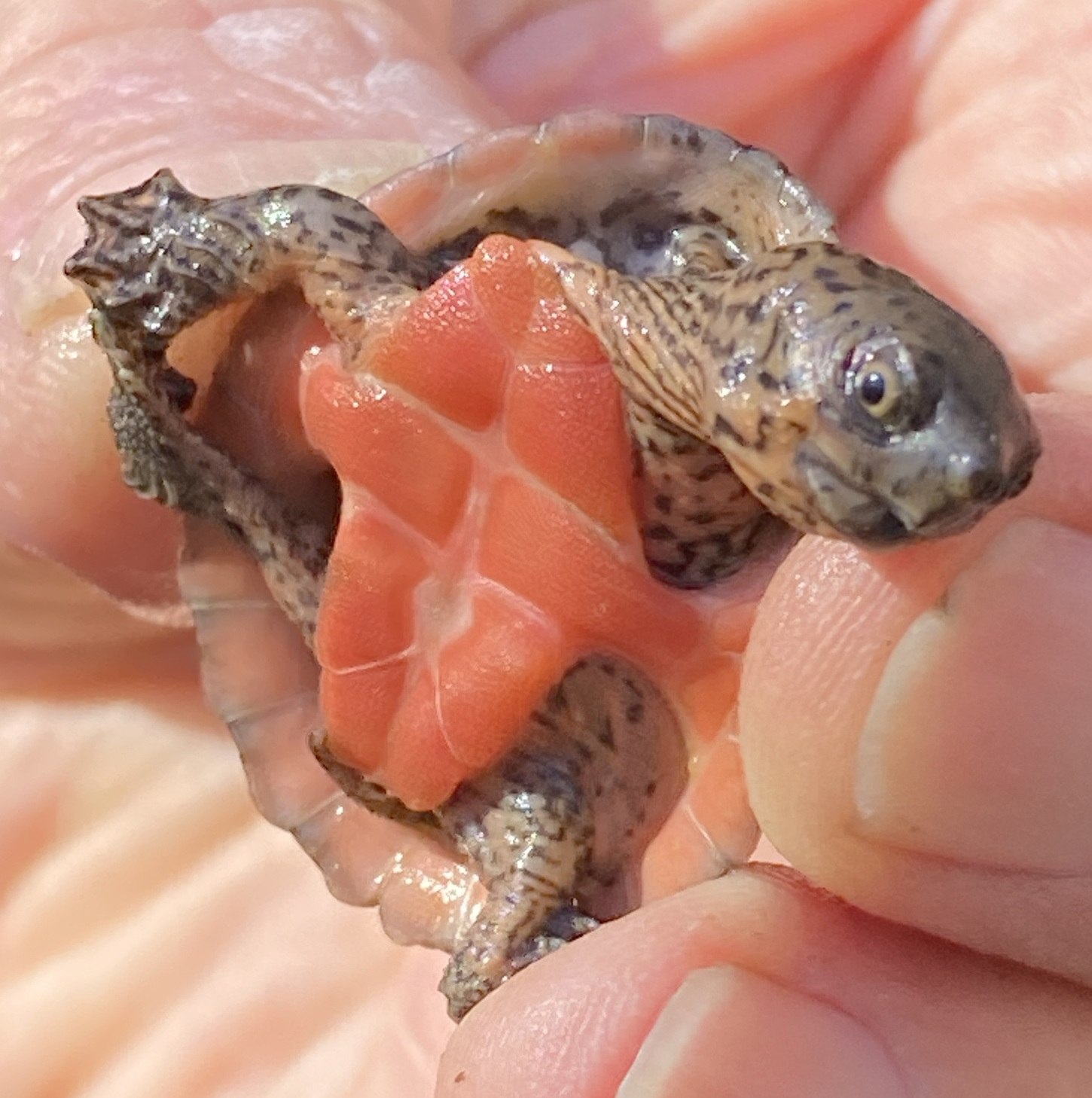
Young turtle plastron, Florida

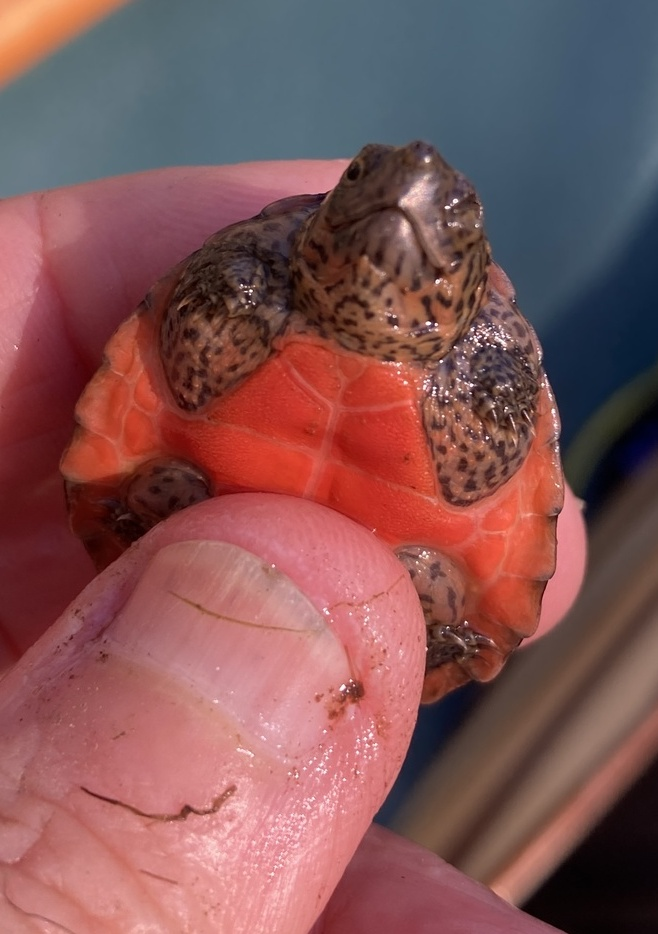
Young turtle plastron, Florida

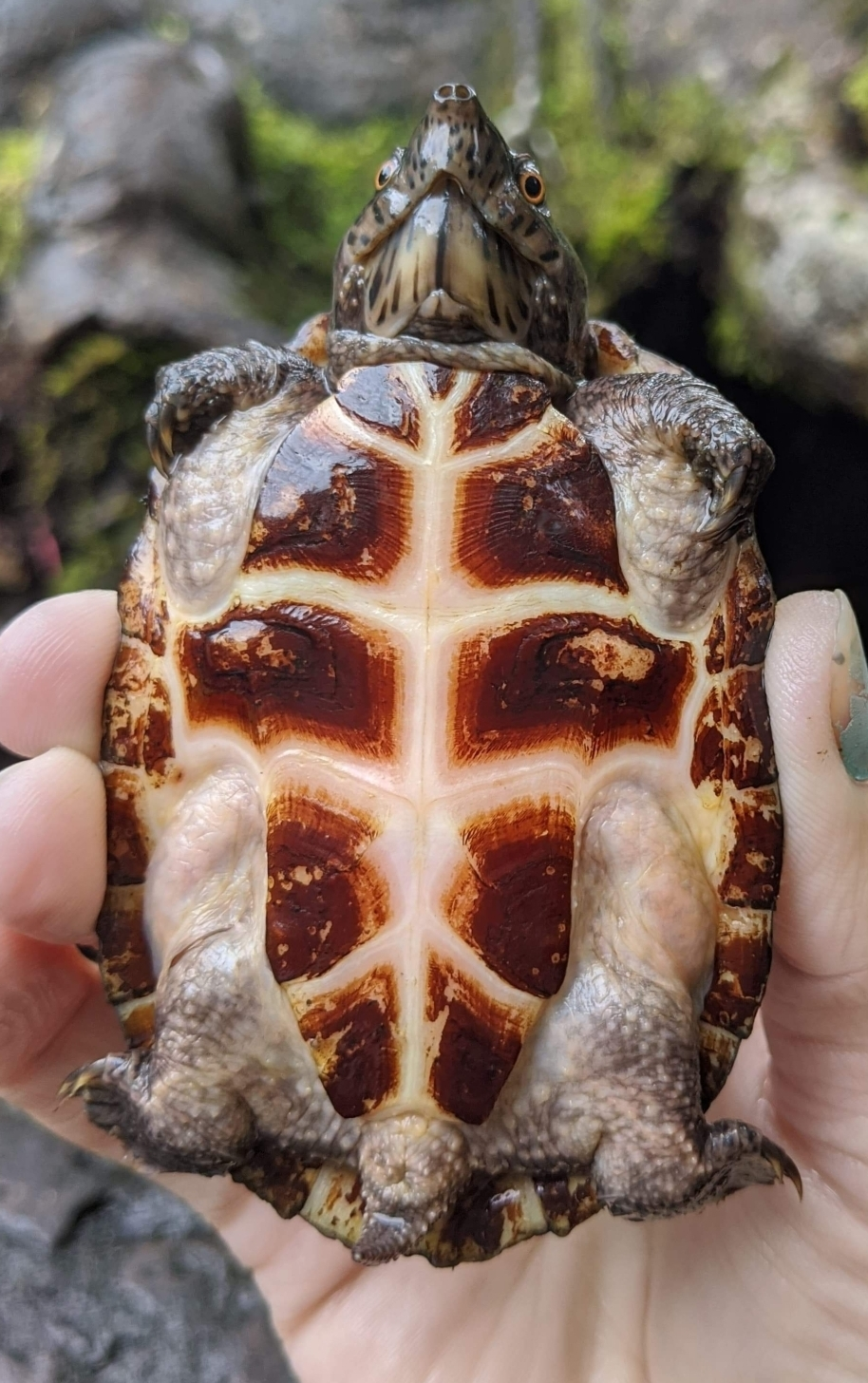
Plastron, Florida

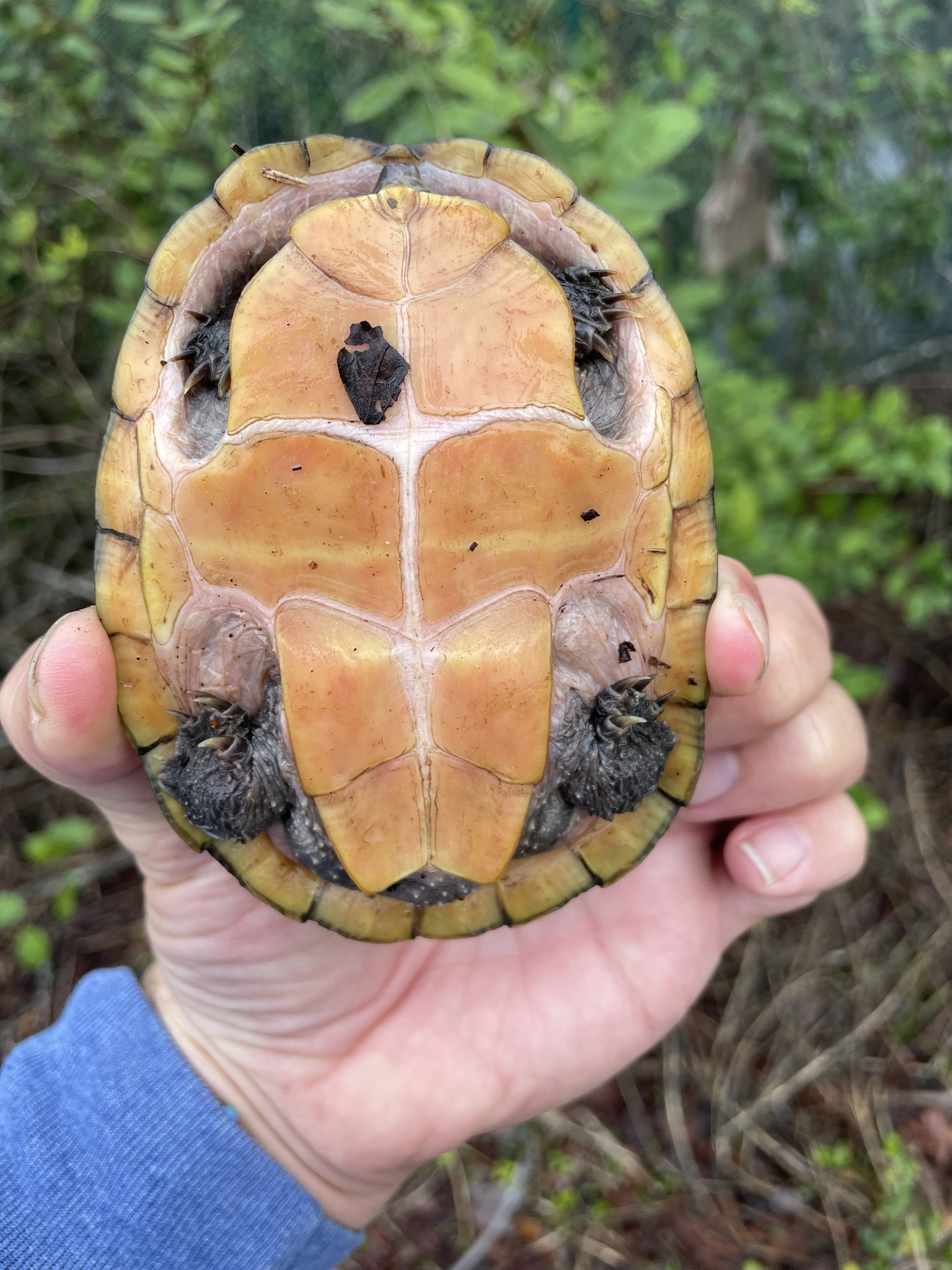
Plastron, Florida

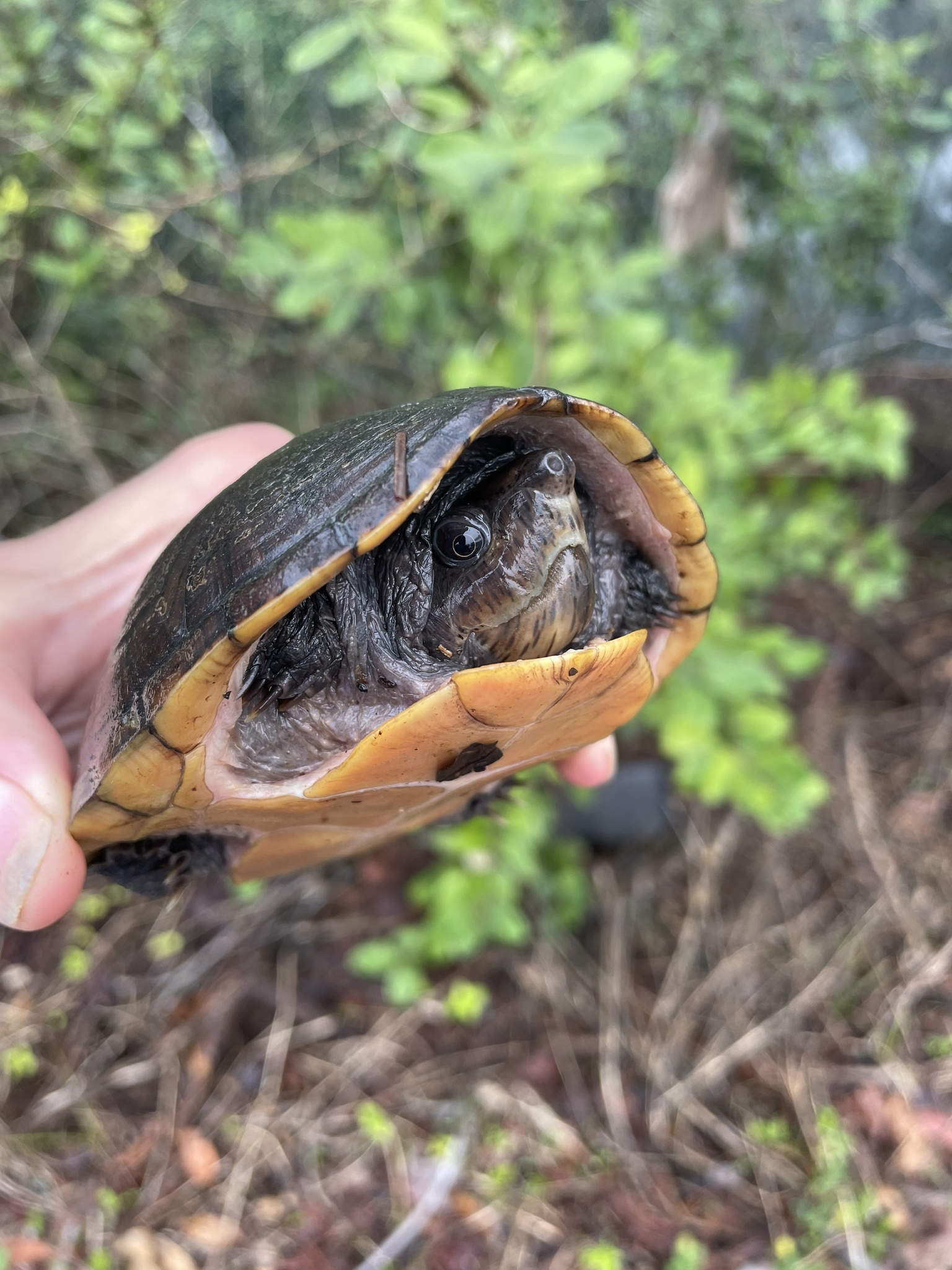
Florida

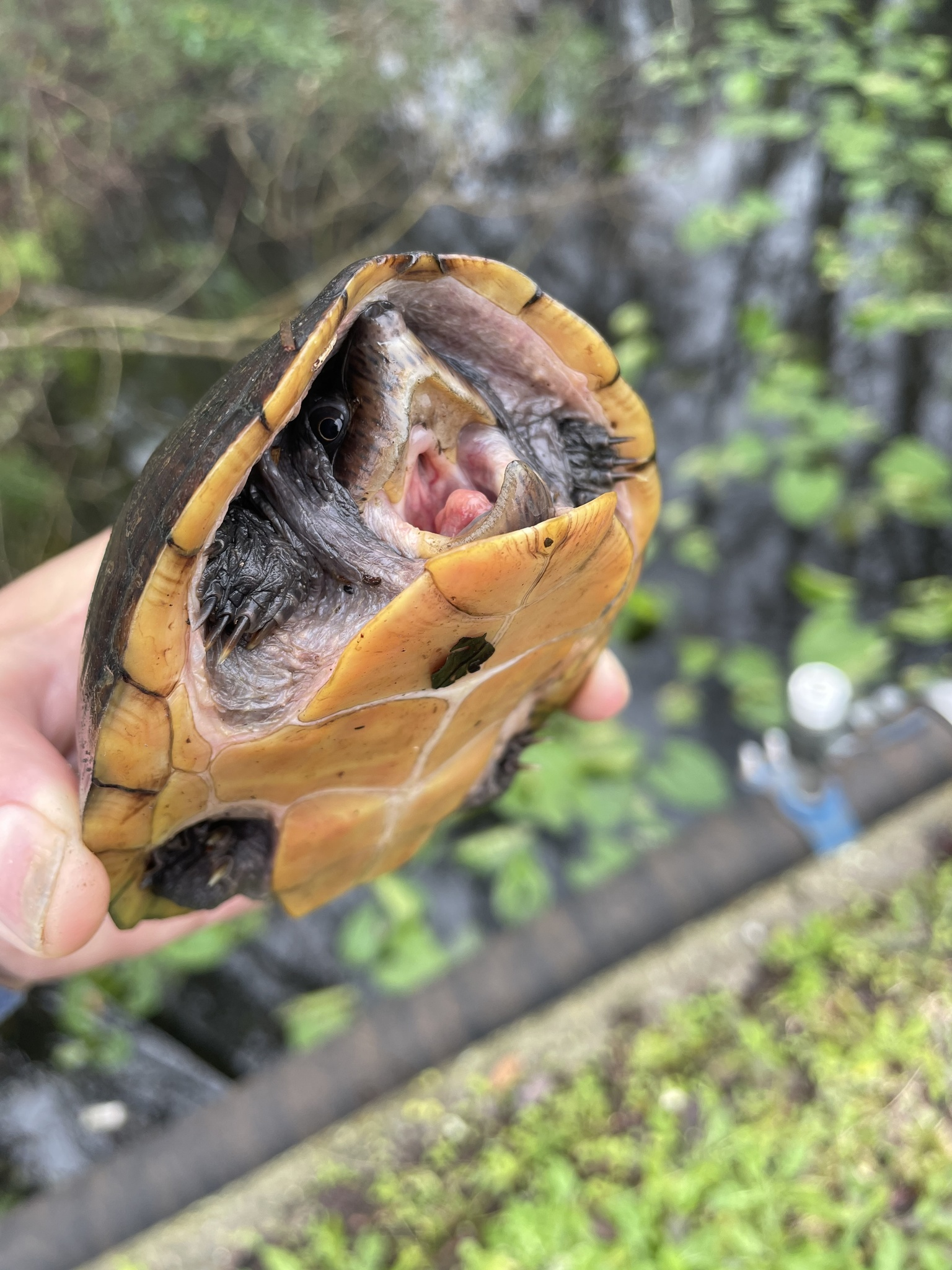
Florida

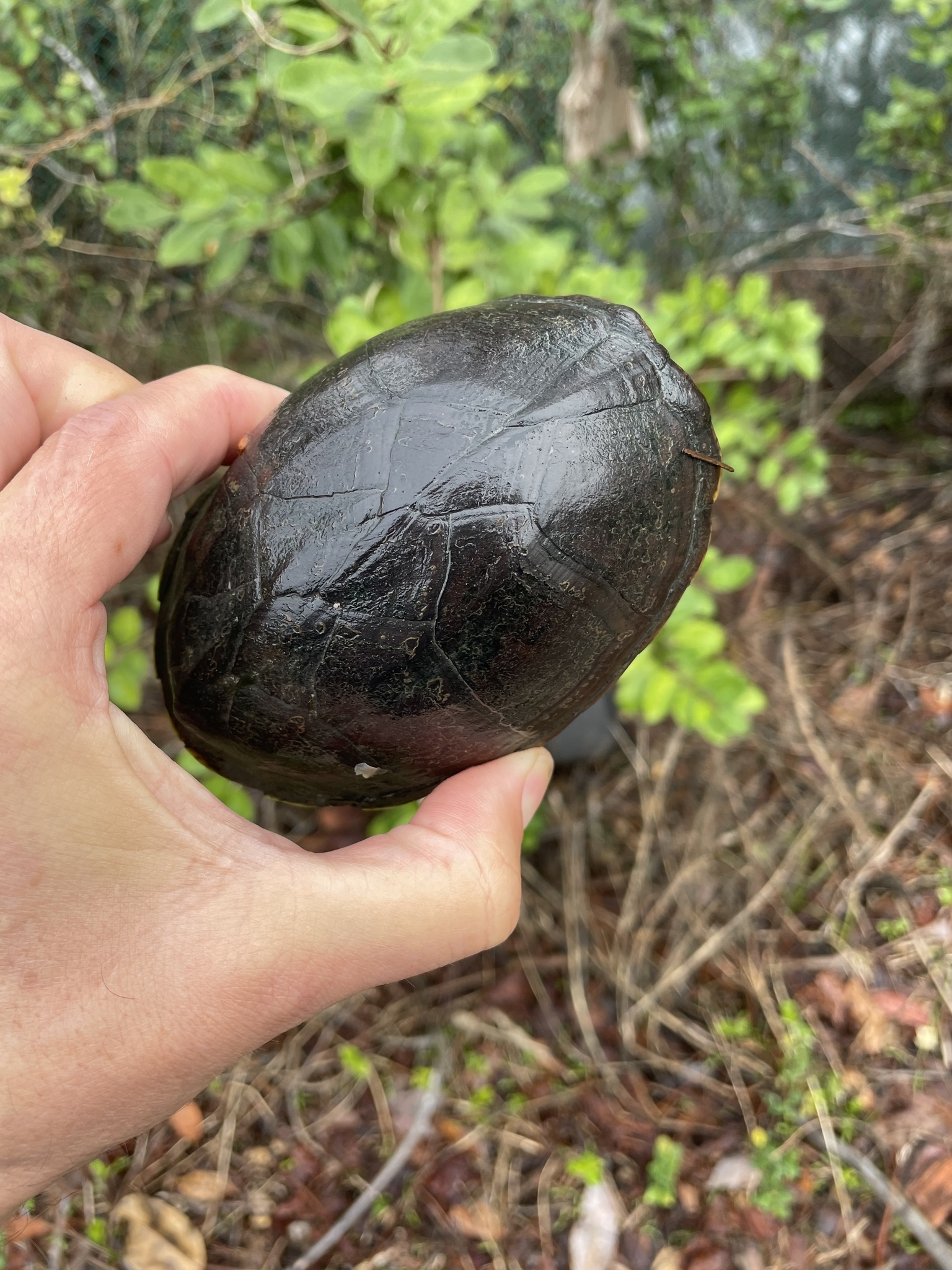
Carapace, Florida

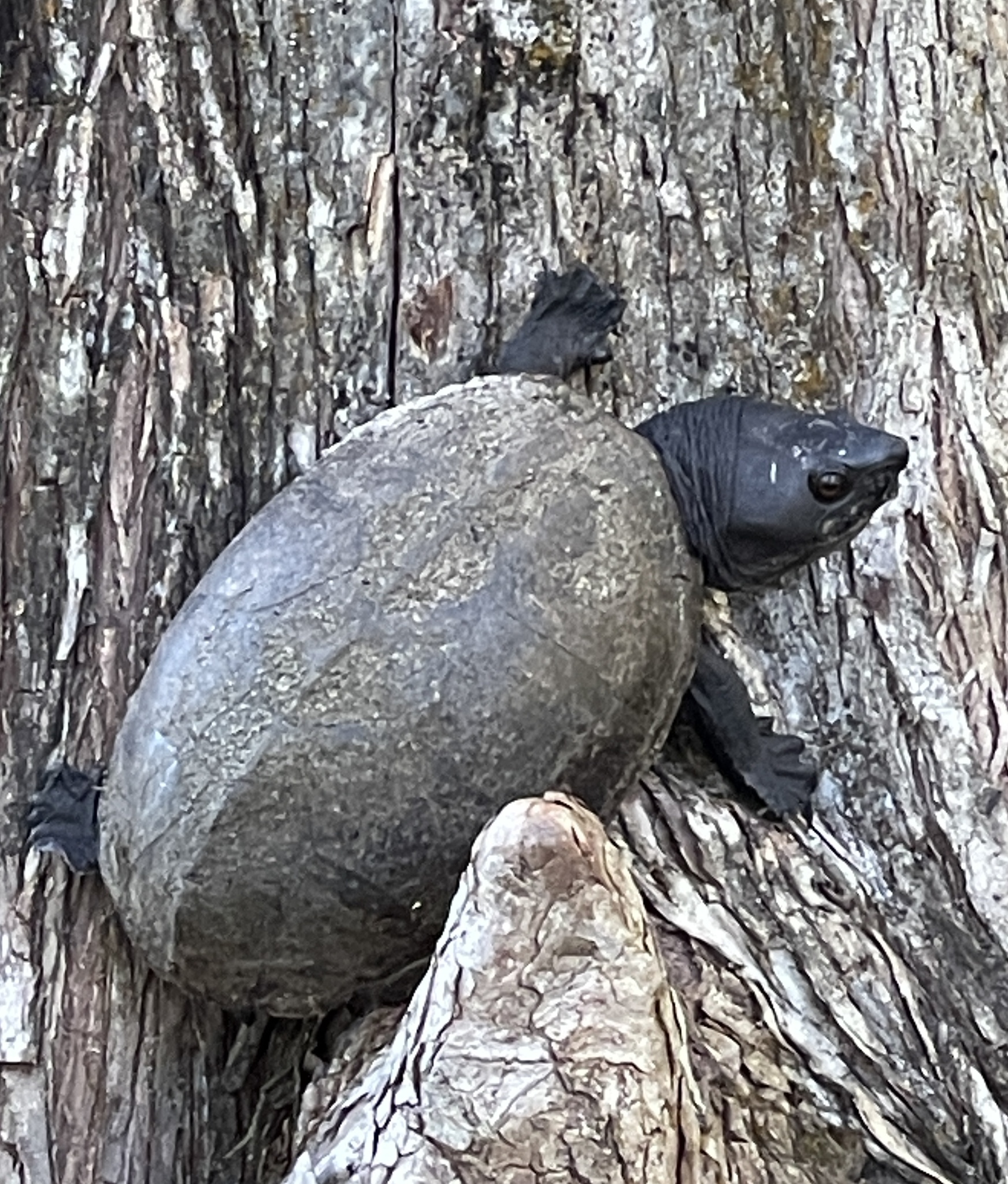
Florida

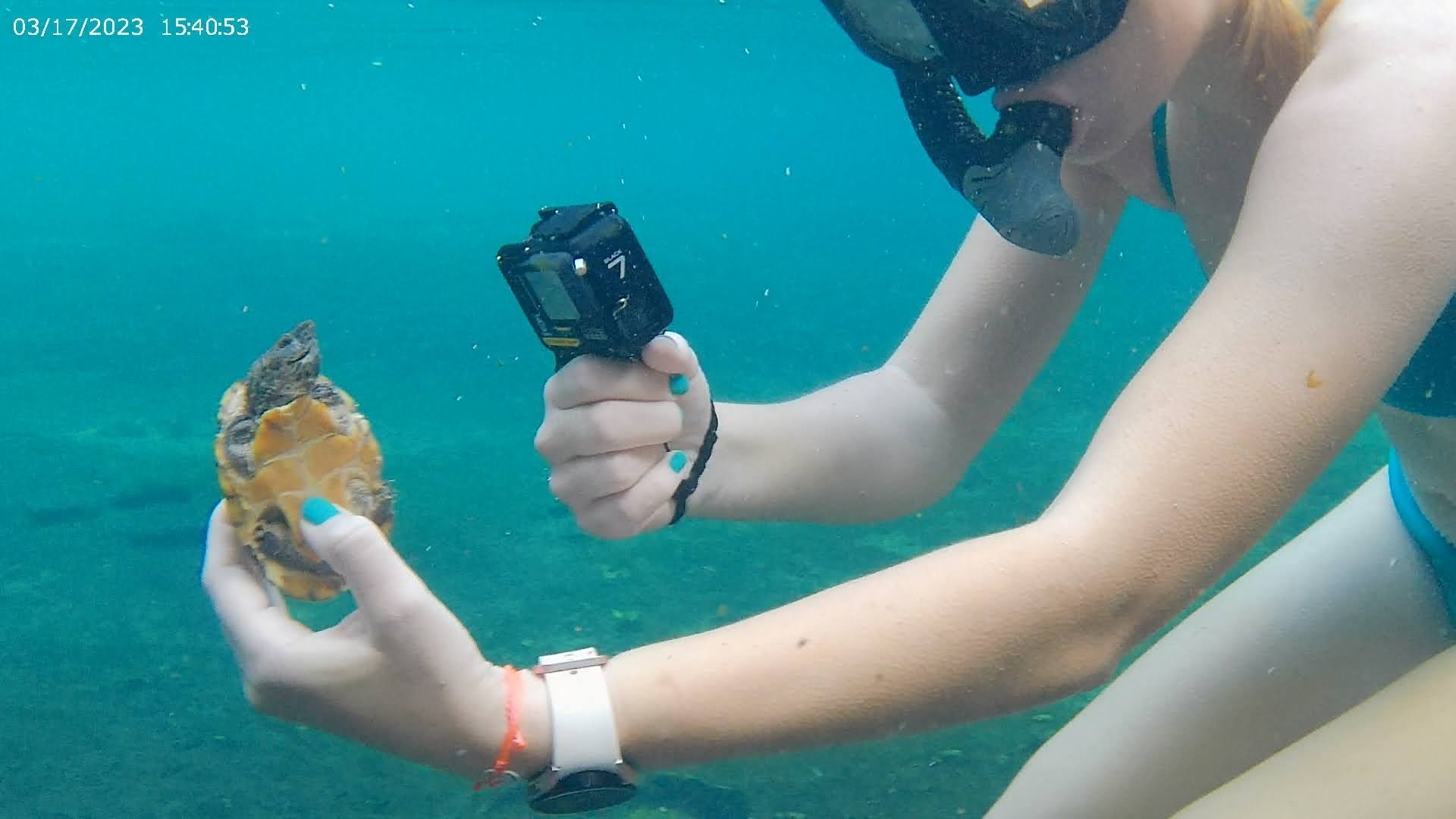
Underwater, Florida
