= Royal Blood discography =

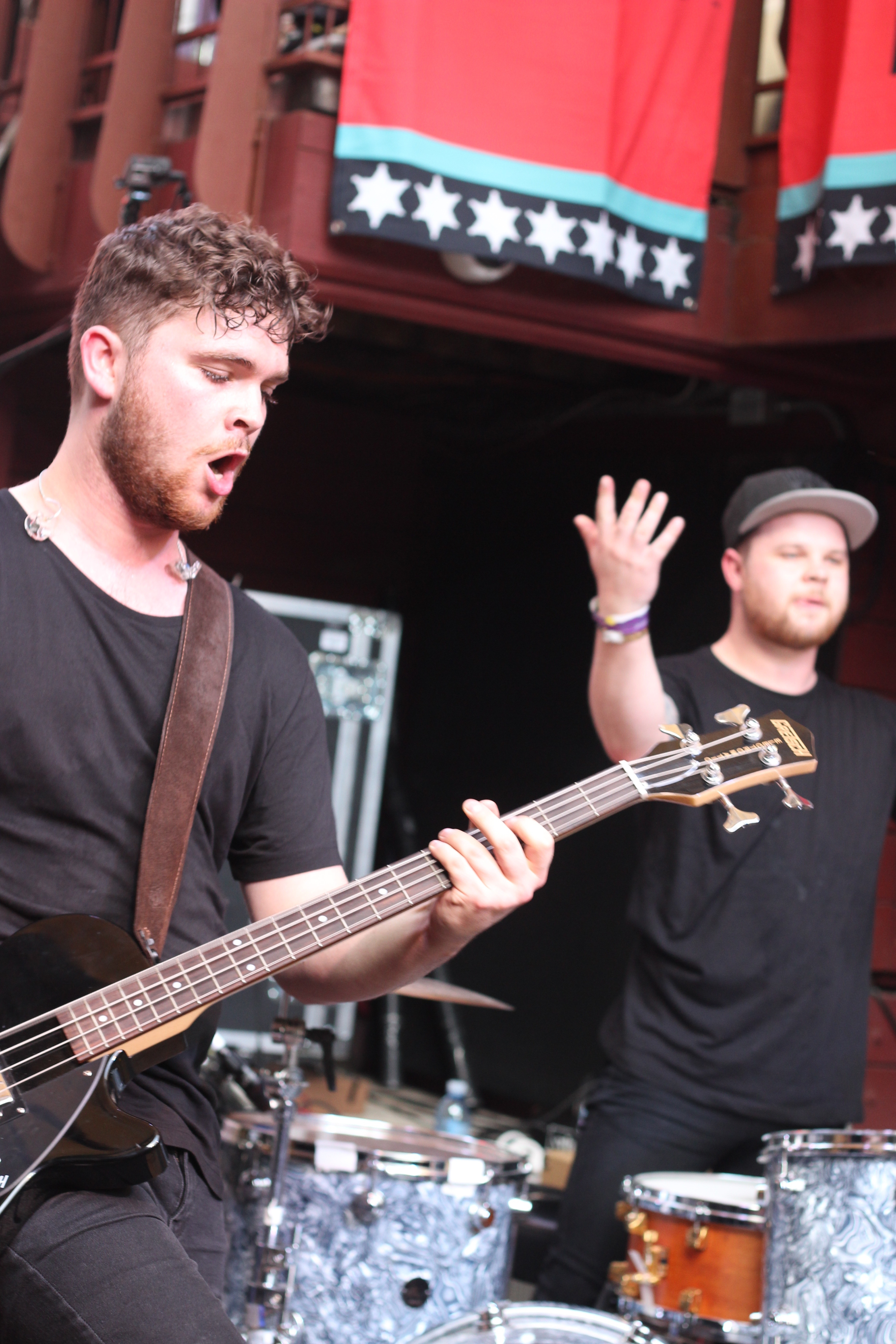
- Royal Blood performing live in 2014
- Studio albums: 5
- EPs: 2
- Singles: 20
- Music videos: 22

English rock duo Royal Blood have released five studio albums, two extended plays (EPs), twenty singles and twenty-two music videos, with a fifth studio album forthcoming in late 2026. Formed in Brighton in March 2011, Royal Blood consists of bassist and vocalist Mike Kerr and drummer Ben Thatcher. After signing with Warner Bros. Records, the duo released their debut single "Out of the Black" in October 2013, which debuted at number 29 on the UK Rock & Metal Singles Chart. In February 2014, "Little Monster" was issued as the band's second single, registering on the UK Singles Chart at number 95 and the UK Rock & Metal Singles Chart at number one. Both singles were later issued alongside their B-sides on the EP Out of the Black in March. "Come On Over" – initially featured as the B-side to "Out of the Black" – was released as a single in April, reaching number 68 on the UK Singles Chart. At the same time, "Little Monster" also returned to the charts, peaking at number 74 on the UK Singles Chart.

Royal Blood's self-titled debut album was released in August 2014, topping the UK Albums Chart, Irish Albums Chart and Scottish Albums Chart. The week before the album's release, "Out of the Black" registered on the UK Singles Chart at number 78, while the band's fourth single "Figure It Out" debuted at number 50 (it would later peak at number 43). Royal Blood was certified gold by the British Phonographic Industry (BPI) by September, and eventually received a platinum certification for sales in excess of 300,000 units. "Ten Tonne Skeleton" was released as the fifth and final single from Royal Blood in late 2014; it charted in Canada only, reaching number 45 on the Canadian Rock Songs chart. "Where Are You Now?", featured on the TV series Vinyl, also registered on the chart, peaking at number 43.

In April 2017, it was announced that Royal Blood's second album How Did We Get So Dark? would be released in June. "Lights Out" was issued as the first single from the album the same month, debuting at number 96 on the UK Singles Chart and number one on the UK Rock & Metal Singles Chart. How Did We Get So Dark? debuted atop the UK Albums Chart upon its release, while a total of ten tracks from the album reached the top 20 of the UK Rock & Metal Singles Chart.

The band officially announced their third studio album Typhoons on 21 January 2021, with a planned release date for 30 April 2021. The band released three singles from Typhoons preceding the album's release: "Trouble's Coming", "Typhoons", and "Limbo".

On 25 May 2023, Royal Blood released "Mountains at Midnight", the lead single from their fourth studio album, Back to the Water Below. The second single "Pull Me Through" was released on 13 July 2023. The album was released on 1 September 2023.

On 12 August 2026, Royal Blood released "Ten Over Ten", the lead single from their fifth studio album, Dead Company. The album was released on 6 November 2026.

== Studio albums ==
List of studio albums, with selected chart positions, sales and certifications
Title	Album details	Peak chart positions										Sales	Certifications
Title	Album details	UK	AUS	CAN	FIN	IRL	NED	NZ	SCO	SWI	US	Sales	Certifications
Royal Blood	Released: 22 August 2014; Label: Black Mammoth, Warner Bros.; Formats: CD, LP, digital download	1	3	9	14	1	13	6	1	6	17	686,000	BPI: 2× Platinum; ARIA: Gold; MC: Gold; RMNZ: Platinum
How Did We Get So Dark?	Released: 16 June 2017; Label: Black Mammoth, Warner Bros.; Formats: CD, LP, CS, digital download	1	4	8	28	4	8	6	1	4	25		BPI: Gold
Typhoons	Released: 30 April 2021; Label: Black Mammoth, Warner; Formats: CD, LP, CS, digital download	1	5	35	29	1	5	6	1	9	48		BPI: Gold
Back to the Water Below	Released: 1 September 2023; Label: Black Mammoth, Warner; Formats: CD, LP, CS, digital download	1	32	—	—	51	19	17	1	9	—		
Dead Company	Released: 6 November 2026; Label: Black Mammoth, Warner; Formats: CD, LP, CS, digital download	2	37	—	—	—	26	40	2	11	—		

== Extended plays ==
List of extended plays
Title	EP details
Out of the Black	Released: 11 March 2014; Label: Black Mammoth, Warner Bros.; Formats: CD, LP, digital download
Spotify Sessions	Released: 2 July 2014; Label: Black Mammoth, Warner Bros.; Format: Digital streaming

== Singles ==
List of singles, with selected chart positions and certifications, showing year released and album name
Title	Year	Peak chart positions										Certifications	Album
Title	Year	UK	UK Rock	BEL (FL)	BEL (WA)	CAN	CAN Rock	FIN	HUN	SCO	US Rock	Certifications	Album
"Out of the Black"	2013	78	1	—	—	—	35	61	—	64	47	BPI: Gold; MC: Gold; RMNZ: Gold	Out of the Black and Royal Blood
"Little Monster"	2014	74	1	— (Note: "Little Monster" did not register on the Ultratop Singles Chart, but did reach number 3 on the Ultratip Singles chart.)	—	—	4	30	—	88	33	BPI: Gold; MC: Gold; RMNZ: Gold	Out of the Black and Royal Blood
"Come On Over"	2014	68	—	—	—	—	—	—	—	73	—	BPI: Silver	Out of the Black and Royal Blood
"Figure It Out"	2014	43	—	46	— (Note: "Figure It Out" did not register on the Ultratop Singles Chart, but did reach number 44 on the Ultratip Singles chart.)	95	1	31	—	36	18	BPI: Platinum; MC: Platinum; RMNZ: Platinum	Royal Blood
"Ten Tonne Skeleton"	2014	— (Note: "Ten Tonne Skeleton" did not enter the UK Singles Chart, but peaked at number 83 on the UK Singles Downloads Chart.)	—	— (Note: "Ten Tonne Skeleton" did not register on the Ultratop Singles Chart, but did reach number 6 on the Ultratip Singles chart.)	—	—	45	—	—	88	—	BPI: Silver; RMNZ: Gold	Royal Blood
"Lights Out"	2017	96	1	— (Note: "Lights Out" did not register on the Ultratop Singles Chart, but did reach number 6 on the Ultratip Singles chart.)	— (Note: "Lights Out" did not register on the Ultratop Singles Chart, but did reach number 43 on the Ultratip Singles chart.)	—	2	—	—	46	28	BPI: Silver; MC: Gold	How Did We Get So Dark?
"Hook, Line & Sinker"	2017	— (Note: "Hook, Line & Sinker" did not enter the UK Singles Chart, but peaked at number 78 on the UK Singles Downloads Chart.)	1	—	—	—	—	—	—	67	— (Note: "Hook, Line & Sinker" did not chart on the Hot Rock & Alternative Songs chart but did peak at number 25 on the Hard Rock Digital Song Sales chart.)		How Did We Get So Dark?
"I Only Lie When I Love You"	2017	—	2	— (Note: "I Only Lie When I Love You" did not register on the Ultratop Singles Chart, but did reach number 8 on the Ultratip Singles chart.)	— (Note: "I Only Lie When I Love You" did not register on the Ultratop Singles Chart, but entered the Ultratip Singles chart as an "extra tip".)	—	2	—	—	—	19	BPI: Silver	How Did We Get So Dark?
"How Did We Get So Dark?"	2017	—	4	— (Note: "How Did We Get So Dark?" did not register on the Ultratop Singles Chart, but did reach number four on the Ultratip Singles chart.)	—	—	—	—	—	—	—		How Did We Get So Dark?
"Hole in Your Heart"	2018	—	12	—	—	—	31	—	—	—	— (Note: "Hole in Your Heart" did not chart on the Hot Rock & Alternative Songs chart but did peak at number 36 on the Rock Airplay chart.)		How Did We Get So Dark?
"Trouble's Coming"	2020	46	—	— (Note: "Trouble's Coming" did not register on the Ultratop Singles Chart, but did reach number 14 on the Ultratip Singles chart.)	— (Note: "Trouble's Coming" did not register on the Ultratop Singles Chart, but did reach number 47 on the Ultratip Singles chart.)	— (Note: "Trouble's Coming" did not enter the Billboard Canadian Hot 100, but peaked at number 45 on the Canadian All-format Airplay chart.)	1	—	—	8	28	BPI: Silver; MC: Gold	Typhoons
"Typhoons"	2021	63	2	— (Note: "Typhoons" did not register on the Ultratop Singles Chart, but did reach number 18 on the Ultratip Singles chart.)	—	—	3	—	5	—	— (Note: "Typhoons" did not chart on the Hot Rock & Alternative Songs chart but did peak at number 22 on the Rock Airplay chart.)		Typhoons
"Limbo"	2021	— (Note: "Limbo" did not enter the UK Singles Chart, but peaked at number 3 on the UK Physical Singles Chart.)	—	— (Note: "Limbo" did not register on the Ultratop Singles Chart, but entered the Ultratip Singles chart as an "extra tip".)	—	—	—	—	11	—	—		Typhoons
"Boilermaker"	2021	—	10	— (Note: "Boilermaker" did not register on the Ultratop Singles Chart, but did reach number 20 on the Ultratip Singles chart.)	—	—	—	—	—	—	— (Note: "Boilermaker" did not chart on the Hot Rock & Alternative Songs chart but did peak at number 25 on the Hot Hard Rock Songs chart.)		Typhoons
"Honeybrains"	2022	— (Note: "Honeybrains" did not enter the UK Singles Chart, but peaked at number 65 on the UK Singles Sales Chart.)	17	—	—	—	23	—	—	—	—		Back to the Water Below (Japanese edition)
"Mountains at Midnight"	2023	—	24	—	—	—	18	—	—	—	—		Back to the Water Below
"Pull Me Through"	2023	—	—	—	—	—	13	—	—	—	— (Note: "Pull Me Through" did not chart on the Hot Rock & Alternative Songs chart but did peak at number 26 on the Rock Airplay chart.)		Back to the Water Below
"Ten Over Ten"	2026	—	—	—	—	—	23	—	—	—	—		Dead Company
"Swallow the Bomb"	2026	—	—	—	—	—	—	—	—	—	—		Dead Company
"Dead Company"	2026	—	—	—	—	—	—	—	—	—	—		Dead Company
"—" denotes a release that did not chart or was not released in that territory.

=== Featured singles ===
Title	Year	Album
"Times Like These" (as part of Live Lounge Allstars)	2020	Non-album single

== Other charted and certified songs ==
List of songs, with selected chart positions, showing year released and album name
Title	Year	Peak chart positions							Certifications	Album
Title	Year	UK	UK Rock	BEL (FL)	CAN Rock	MEX Air.	NZ Hot	US Hard Rock	Certifications	Album
"Loose Change"	2014	—	—	—	—	—	—	—	BPI: Silver	Royal Blood
"Where Are You Now?"	2015	—	10	—	43	45	—	—		Vinyl: Music from the HBO Original Series, Vol. 1.8
"She's Creeping"	2017	—	9	—	—	—	—	—		How Did We Get So Dark?
"Look Like You Know"	2017	—	—	— (Note: "Look Like You Know" did not register on the Ultratop Singles Chart, but did reach number 13 on the Ultratip Singles chart.)	—	—	—			How Did We Get So Dark?
"Don't Tell"	2017	—	13	—	—	—	—	—		How Did We Get So Dark?
"Sleep"	2017	—	14	—	—	—	—	—		How Did We Get So Dark?
"Oblivion"	2021	72	4	—	—	—	34	21		Typhoons
"Who Needs Friends"	2021	—	12	—	—	—	—	—		Typhoons
"Million and One"	2021	—	13	—	—	—	—	—		Typhoons
"Mad Visions"	2021	—	17	—	—	—	—	—		Typhoons
"Either You Want It"	2021	—	18	—	—	—	—	—		Typhoons
"Hold On"	2021	—	20	—	—	—	—	—		Typhoons
"All We Have Is Now"	2021	—	34	—	—	—	—	—		Typhoons
"—" denotes a release that did not chart or was not released in that territory.

== Music videos ==
List of music videos, showing year released and director(s) name
Title	Year	Director(s)	Ref.
"Out of the Black" (version 1)	2013	Stephen Agnew	
"Little Monster"	2014	Libby Burke Wilde	
"Come On Over"	2014	AB/CD/CD	
"Figure It Out"	2014	Ninian Doff	
"Ten Tonne Skeleton"	2014	Never Ending Fun	
"Out of the Black" (version 2)	2015	David Wilson, Christy Karacas	
"Lights Out"	2017	The Sacred Egg	
"Hook, Line & Sinker"	2017	Ben Lowe	
"I Only Lie When I Love You"	2017	Pascal Teixeira	
"How Did We Get So Dark?"	2017	The Sacred Egg	
"Look Like You Know"	2018	unknown	
"Trouble's Coming"	2020	LX	
"Typhoons"	2021	Quentin Deronzier	
"Limbo"	2021	Joao Retorta	
"Boilermaker"	2021	Liam Lynch	
"Oblivion"	2021	Liam Lynch	
"Hold On"	2021	Colin Hanks	
"All We Have Is Now"	2021	Liam Lynch	
"Honeybrains"	2022	Joel Barney	
"Mountains at Midnight"	2023	Milo Blake	
"Pull Me Through"	2023	Polocho	
"Shiner In The Dark"	2023	Polocho	
"Ten Over Ten"	2026	Edward Cooke	
"Swallow The Bomb"	2026	unknown	
"Dead Company"	2026	Mark Szumski, Gina Niespodziani	
