= List of UK Rock & Metal Singles Chart number ones of 2014 =

The UK Rock & Metal Singles Chart is a record chart which ranks the best-selling rock and heavy metal songs in the United Kingdom. Compiled and published by the Official Charts Company, the data is based on each track's weekly physical sales, digital downloads and streams. In 2014, there were 20 singles that topped the 52 published charts. The first number-one single of the year was "Highway to Hell" by Australian hard rock band AC/DC, which spent the last week of 2013 and the first of 2014 atop the chart. The final number-one single of the year was a live version of Iron Maiden's "The Number of the Beast".

The most successful song on the UK Rock & Metal Singles Chart in 2014 was "Centuries", the lead single from Fall Out Boy's sixth studio album American Beauty/American Psycho, which spent a total of eleven weeks at number one during the year, including a single run of nine consecutive weeks. Royal Blood also spent eleven weeks at number one in 2014, ten of which were for "Little Monster" (the other one for "Out of the Black"). Twin Atlantic spent seven weeks at number one with "Heart and Soul" (five weeks) and "Brothers and Sisters" (two weeks), while The Pretty Reckless were number one for three weeks with "Heaven Knows". Six artists – Nickelback, Guns N' Roses, You Me at Six, Linkin Park, Red Hot Chili Peppers and Foo Fighters – were number one on the chart for two weeks in 2014.

== Chart history ==
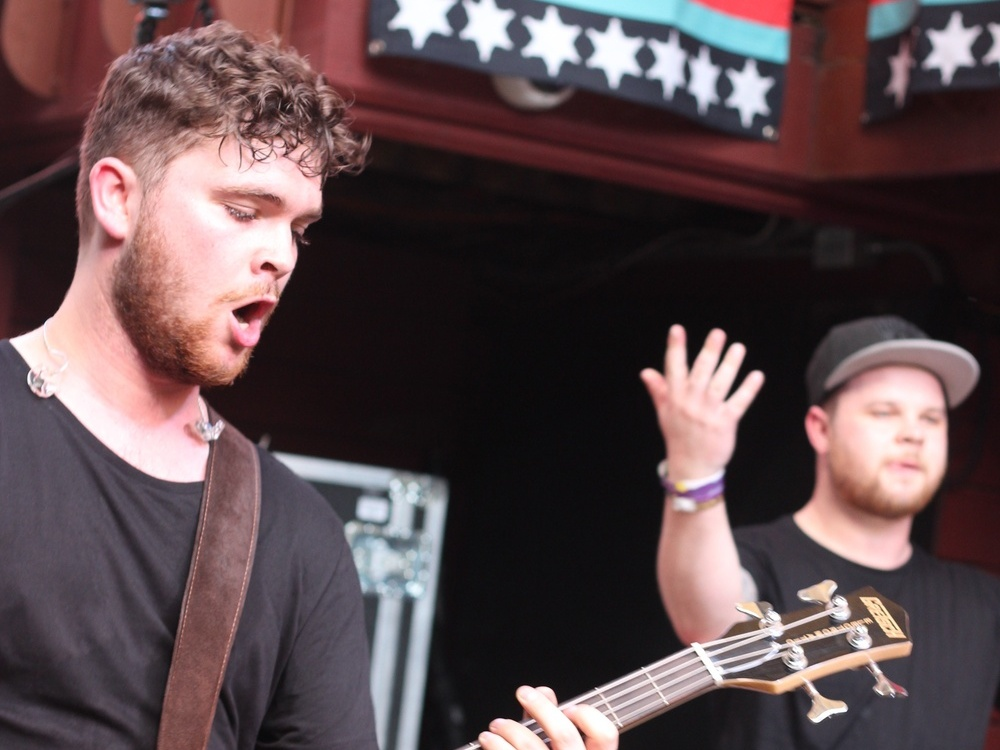
Royal Blood spent 11 weeks at number one, with "Little Monster" (ten weeks) and "Out of the Black" (one week).

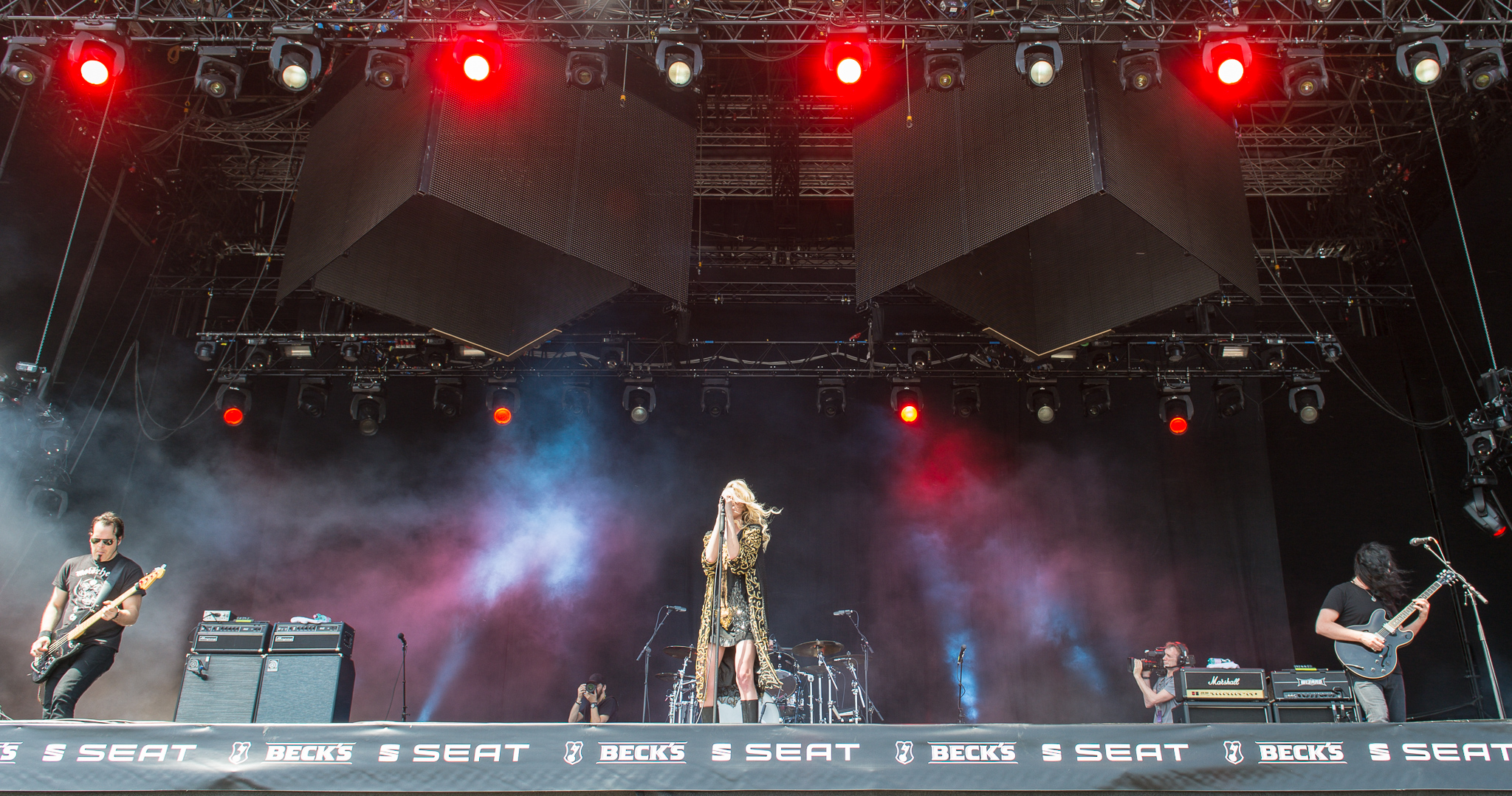
"Heaven Knows" by The Pretty Reckless was number one for three consecutive weeks in 2014.

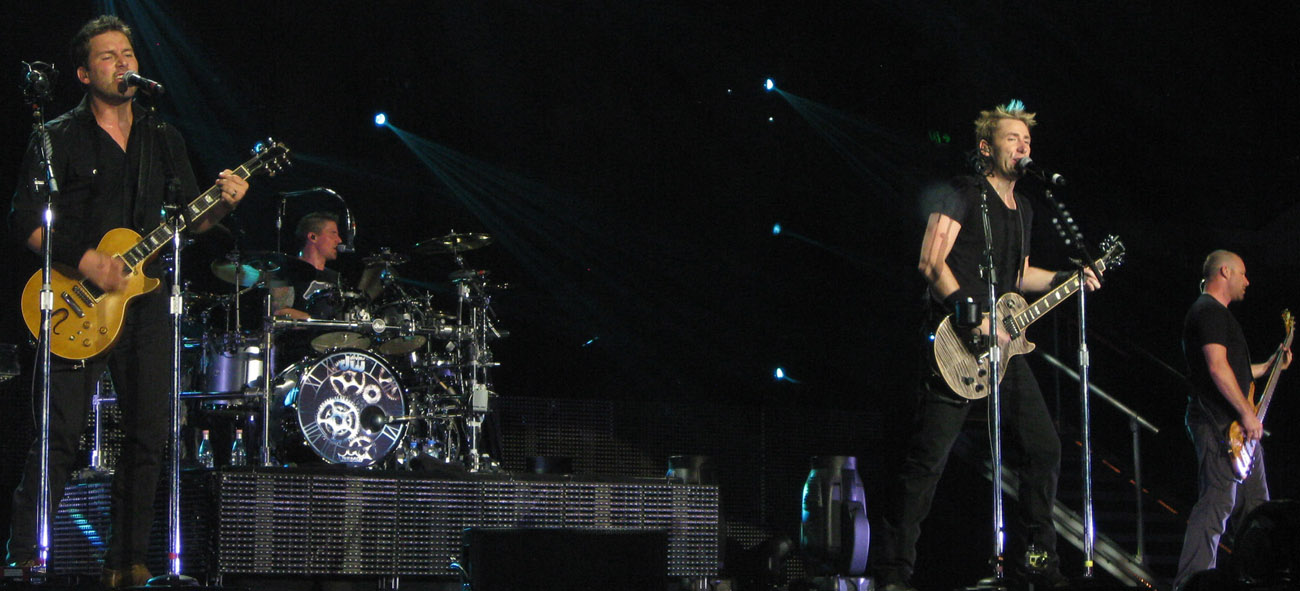
Nickelback's "Rockstar" was number one for two weeks in January 2014.

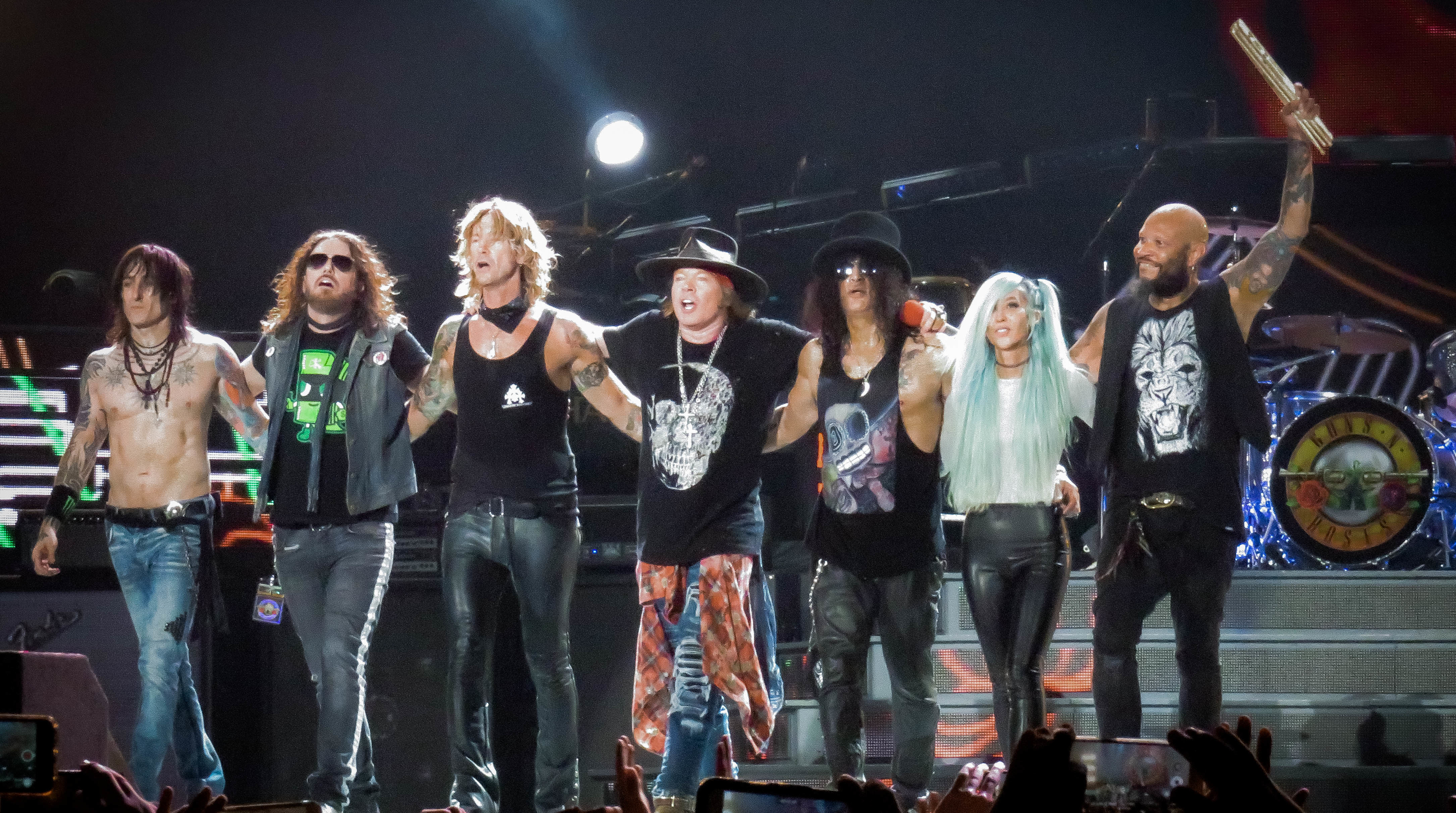
Guns N' Roses spent two weeks at number one on the chart in 2014 with "Sweet Child o' Mine".

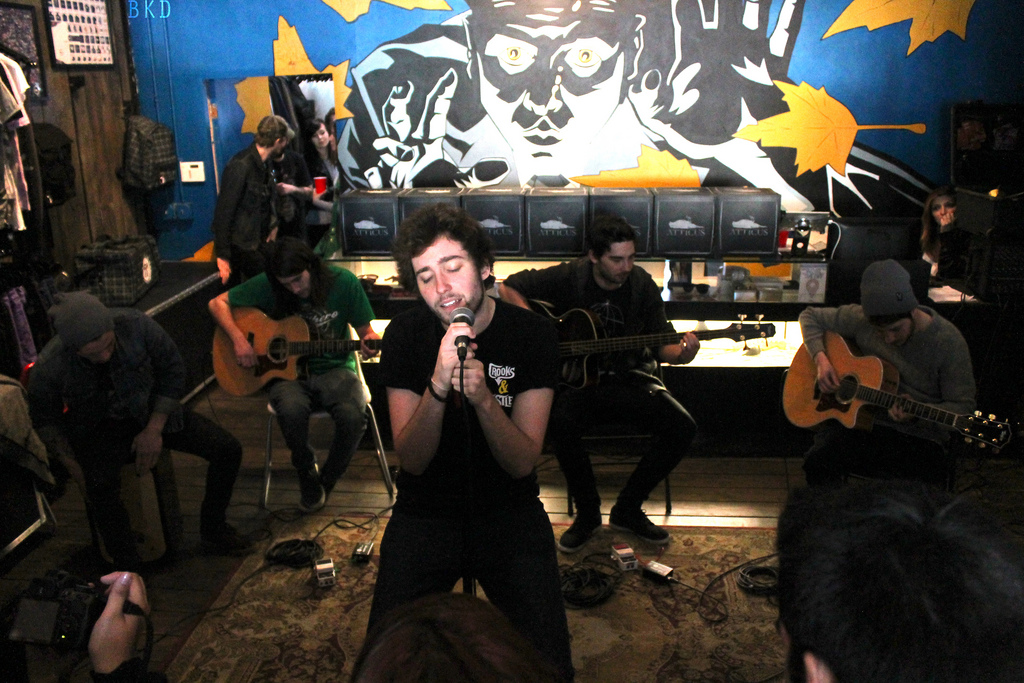
"Lived a Lie" by You Me at Six was number one for two weeks.

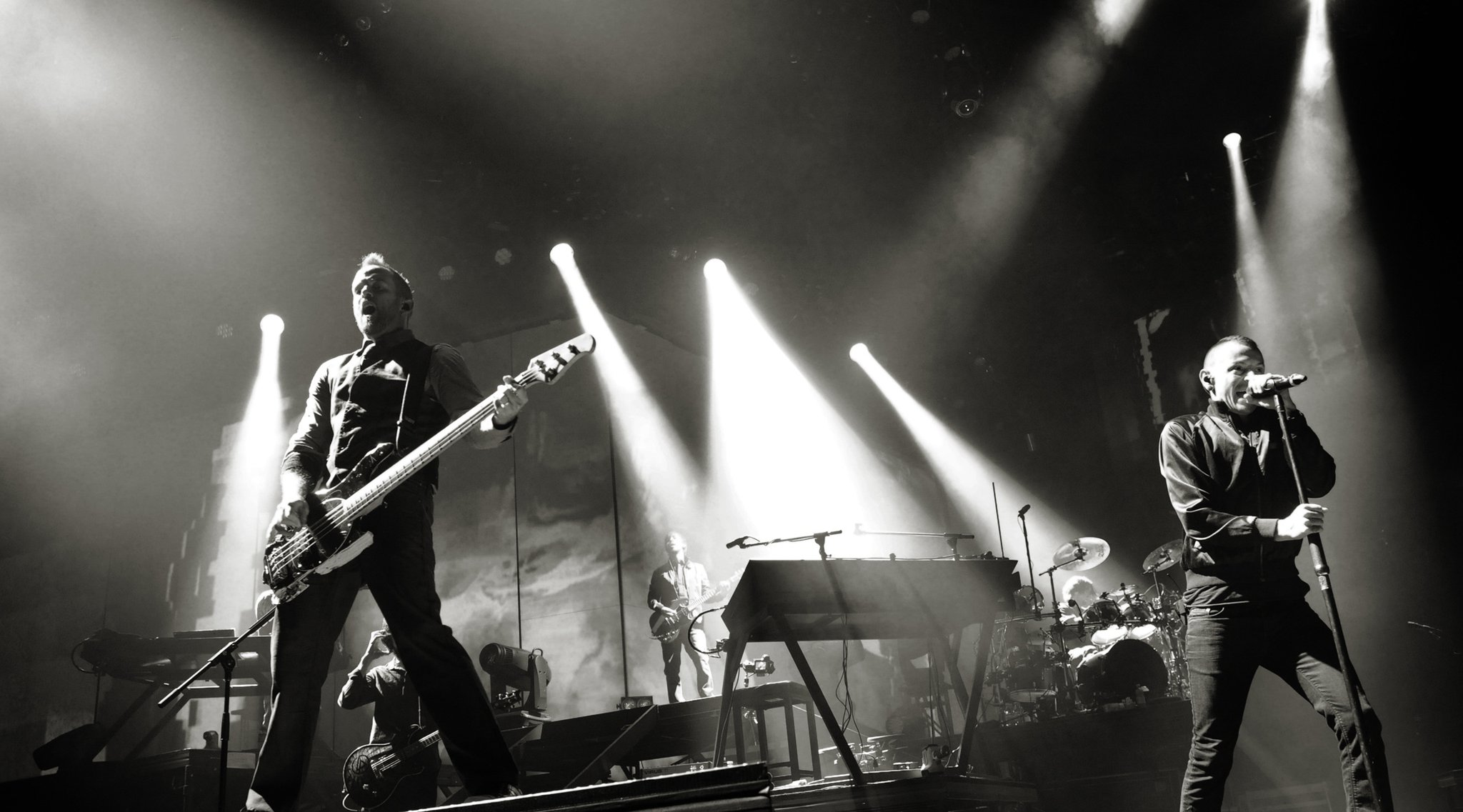
Linkin Park's "Until It's Gone" topped the chart for two weeks in May.

Issue date	Single	Artist(s)	Record label(s)	Ref.
4 January	"Highway to Hell"	AC/DC	Columbia	
11 January	"Rockstar"	Nickelback	Roadrunner	
18 January	"Rockstar"	Nickelback	Roadrunner	
25 January	"Sweet Child o' Mine"	Guns N' Roses	Geffen	
1 February	"Sweet Child o' Mine"	Guns N' Roses	Geffen	
8 February	"Lived a Lie"	You Me at Six	BMG Rights	
15 February	"Lived a Lie"	You Me at Six	BMG Rights	
22 February	"Little Monster"	Royal Blood	Warner Bros.	
1 March	"Fake Your Death"	My Chemical Romance	Reprise	
8 March	"Little Monster"	Royal Blood	Warner Bros.	
15 March	"Heaven Knows"	The Pretty Reckless	Cooking Vinyl	
22 March	"Heaven Knows"	The Pretty Reckless	Cooking Vinyl	
29 March	"Heaven Knows"	The Pretty Reckless	Cooking Vinyl	
5 April	"Little Monster"	Royal Blood	Warner Bros.	
12 April	"The Edge"	Tonight Alive	Sony	
19 April	"Little Monster"	Royal Blood	Warner Bros.	
26 April	"Little Monster"	Royal Blood	Warner Bros.	
3 May	"Little Monster"	Royal Blood	Warner Bros.	
10 May	"Little Monster"	Royal Blood	Warner Bros.	
17 May	"Until It's Gone"	Linkin Park	Warner Bros.	
24 May	"Until It's Gone"	Linkin Park	Warner Bros.	
31 May	"Little Monster"	Royal Blood	Warner Bros.	
7 June	"Heart and Soul"	Twin Atlantic	Red Bull	
14 June	"Heart and Soul"	Twin Atlantic	Red Bull	
21 June	"Heart and Soul"	Twin Atlantic	Red Bull	
28 June	"Heart and Soul"	Twin Atlantic	Red Bull	
5 July	"Heart and Soul"	Twin Atlantic	Red Bull	
12 July	"Enter Sandman"	Metallica	Vertigo	
19 July	"Out of the Black"	Royal Blood	Warner Bros.	
26 July	"Can't Stop"	Red Hot Chili Peppers	Warner Bros.	
2 August	"Can't Stop"	Red Hot Chili Peppers	Warner Bros.	
9 August	"Here We Go"	Lower Than Atlantis	Easy Life	
16 August	"The Negative One"	Slipknot	Roadrunner	
23 August	"Brothers and Sisters"	Twin Atlantic	Red Bull	
30 August	"Brothers and Sisters"	Twin Atlantic	Red Bull	
6 September	"Little Monster"	Royal Blood	Warner Bros.	
13 September	"Little Monster"	Royal Blood	Warner Bros.	
20 September	"Centuries"	Fall Out Boy	Island	
27 September	"Centuries"	Fall Out Boy	Island	
4 October	"Centuries"	Fall Out Boy	Island	
11 October	"Centuries"	Fall Out Boy	Island	
18 October	"Centuries"	Fall Out Boy	Island	
25 October	"Centuries"	Fall Out Boy	Island	
1 November	"Centuries"	Fall Out Boy	Island	
8 November	"Centuries"	Fall Out Boy	Island	
15 November	"Centuries"	Fall Out Boy	Island	
22 November	"Something from Nothing"	Foo Fighters	RCA	
29 November	"Something from Nothing"	Foo Fighters	RCA	
6 December	"Centuries"	Fall Out Boy	Island	
13 December	"Centuries"	Fall Out Boy	Island	
20 December	"Drown"	Bring Me the Horizon	RCA	
27 December	"The Number of the Beast" (live)	Iron Maiden	EMI	

== See also ==
- 2014 in British music
- List of UK Rock & Metal Albums Chart number ones of 2014
