= Out of the Black =

Out of the Black may refer to:

- Out of the Black (Boys Noize album), 2012
- Out of the Black (The Stranglers album), 2002
- Out of the Black (EP), by Royal Blood, 2014
  - "Out of the Black" (song), the title song
- Out of the Black (film), an American film of 2001
