= List of UK Rock & Metal Albums Chart number ones of 2014 =

The UK Rock & Metal Albums Chart is a record chart which ranks the best-selling rock and heavy metal albums in the United Kingdom. Compiled and published by the Official Charts Company, the data is based on each album's weekly physical sales, digital downloads and streams. In 2014, there were 39 albums that topped the 52 published charts. The first number-one album of the year was the 2009 Foo Fighters compilation Greatest Hits. The first new number-one album of the year was Dark Days, the third and final album by English alternative rock band Canterbury. The final number-one album of the year was Pink Floyd's fifteenth and final studio album The Endless River, which first topped the chart for three weeks in November before returning for a two-week spell at the end of December.

The most successful album on the UK Rock & Metal Albums Chart in 2014 was The Endless River, which spent five weeks at number one and was the best-selling rock and metal album of the year, ranking ninth in the UK End of Year Albums Chart. Cavalier Youth by You Me at Six spent four separate weeks at number one during early 2014, ranking as the 98th best-selling album in the UK for the year. The second album by Slash featuring Myles Kennedy and The Conspirators, World on Fire was number one for three weeks, while four albums – Queens of the Stone Age's sixth studio album ...Like Clockwork, Black Stone Cherry's fourth studio album Magic Mountain, Linkin Park's sixth studio album The Hunting Party and Slipknot's fifth studio album .5: The Gray Chapter – spent two weeks at number one in 2014.

== Chart history ==
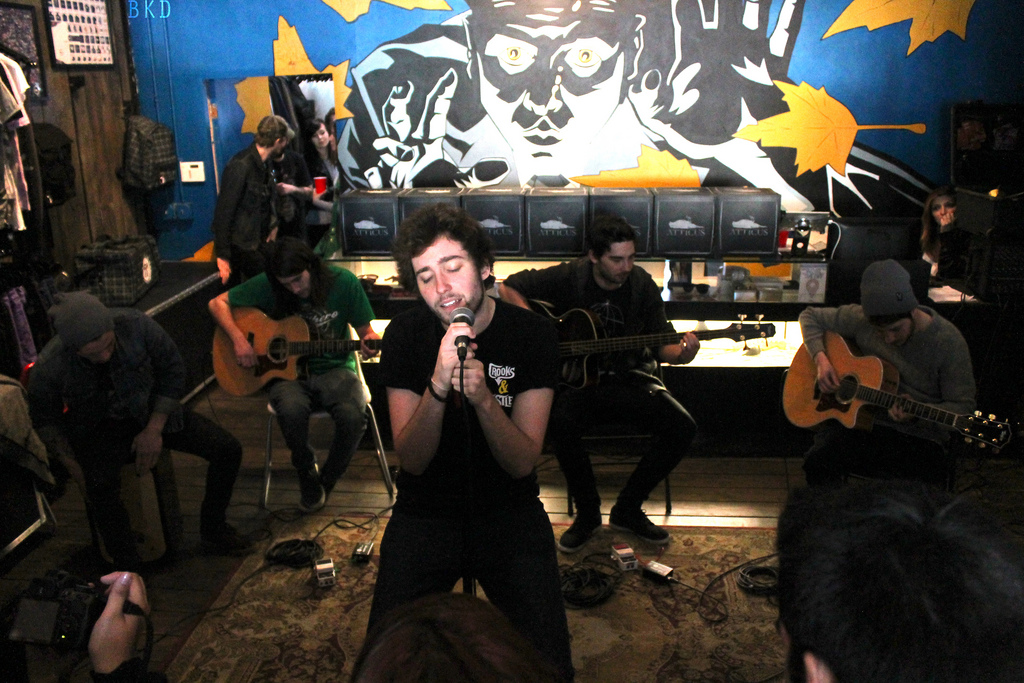
You Me at Six spent four separate weeks at number one in 2014 with their fourth studio album Cavalier Youth.

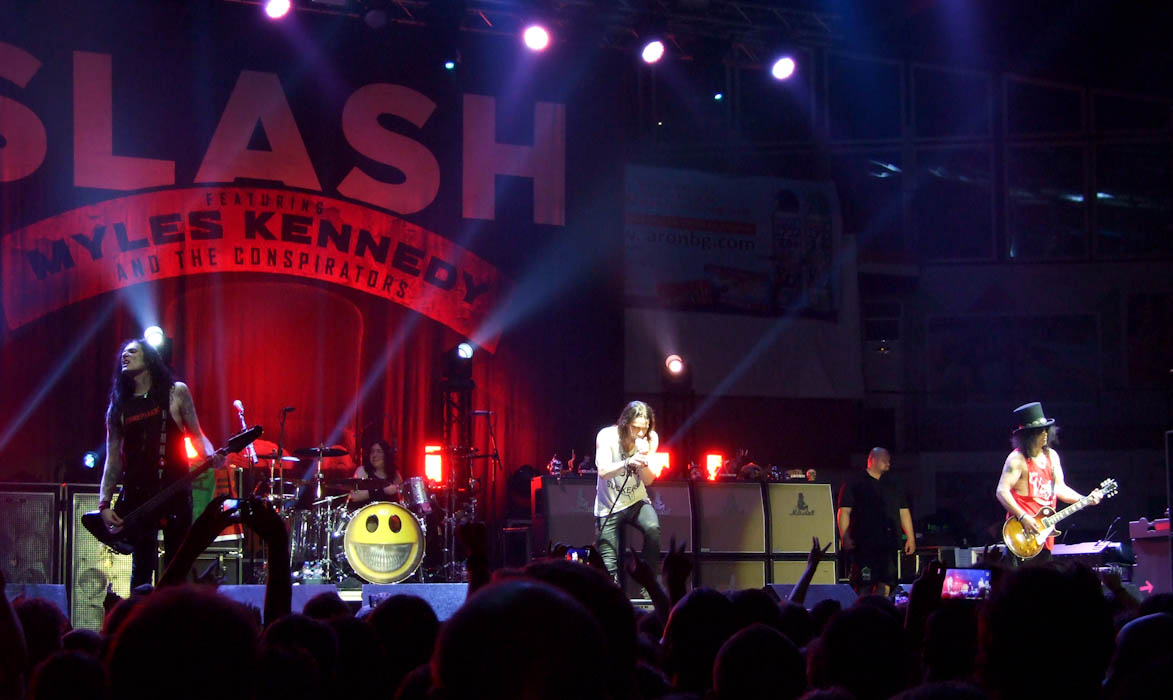
World on Fire, the second album by Slash featuring Myles Kennedy and The Conspirators, spent three weeks at number-one during 2014.

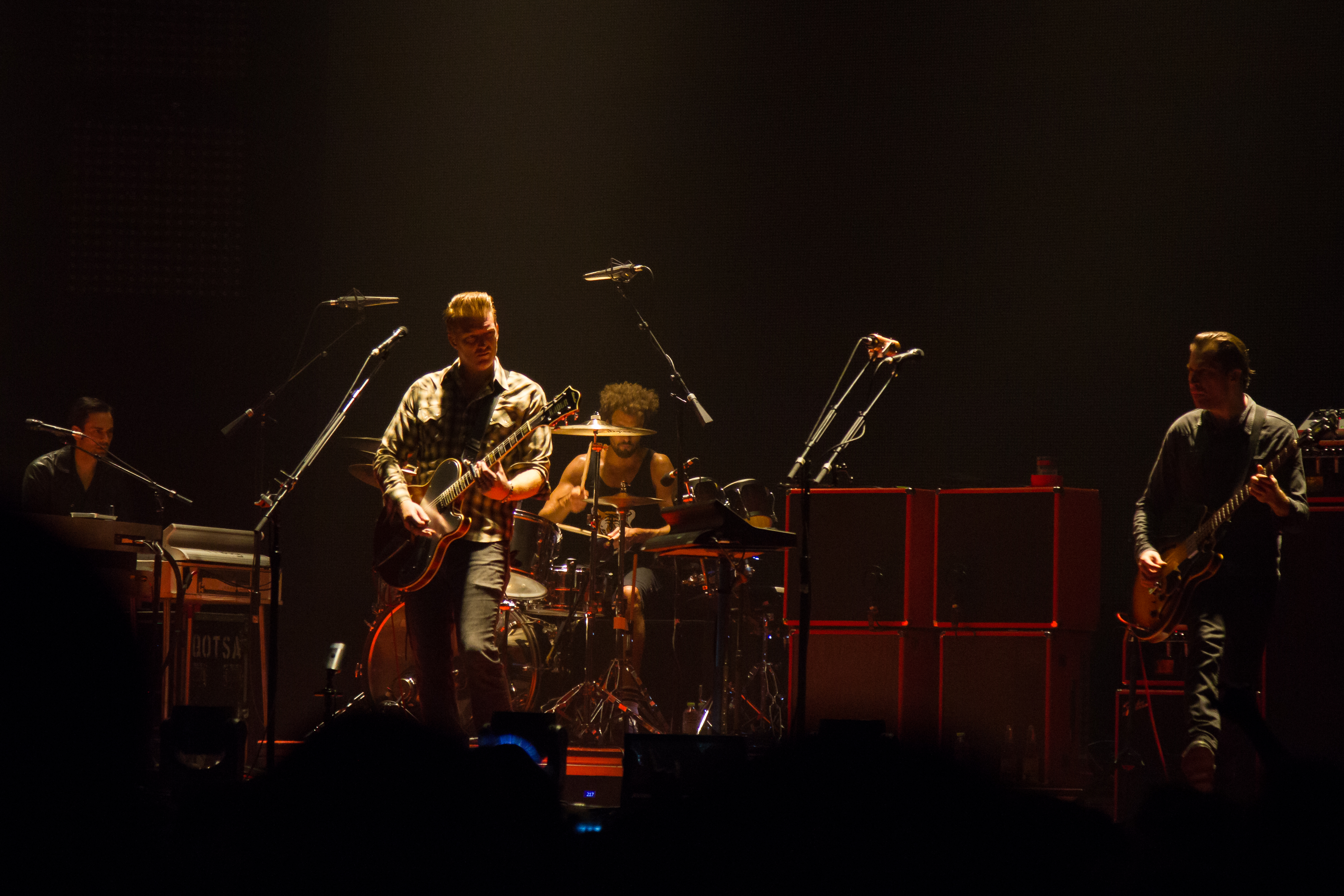
Queens of the Stone Age spent two weeks at number one in January with 2013's ...Like Clockwork.

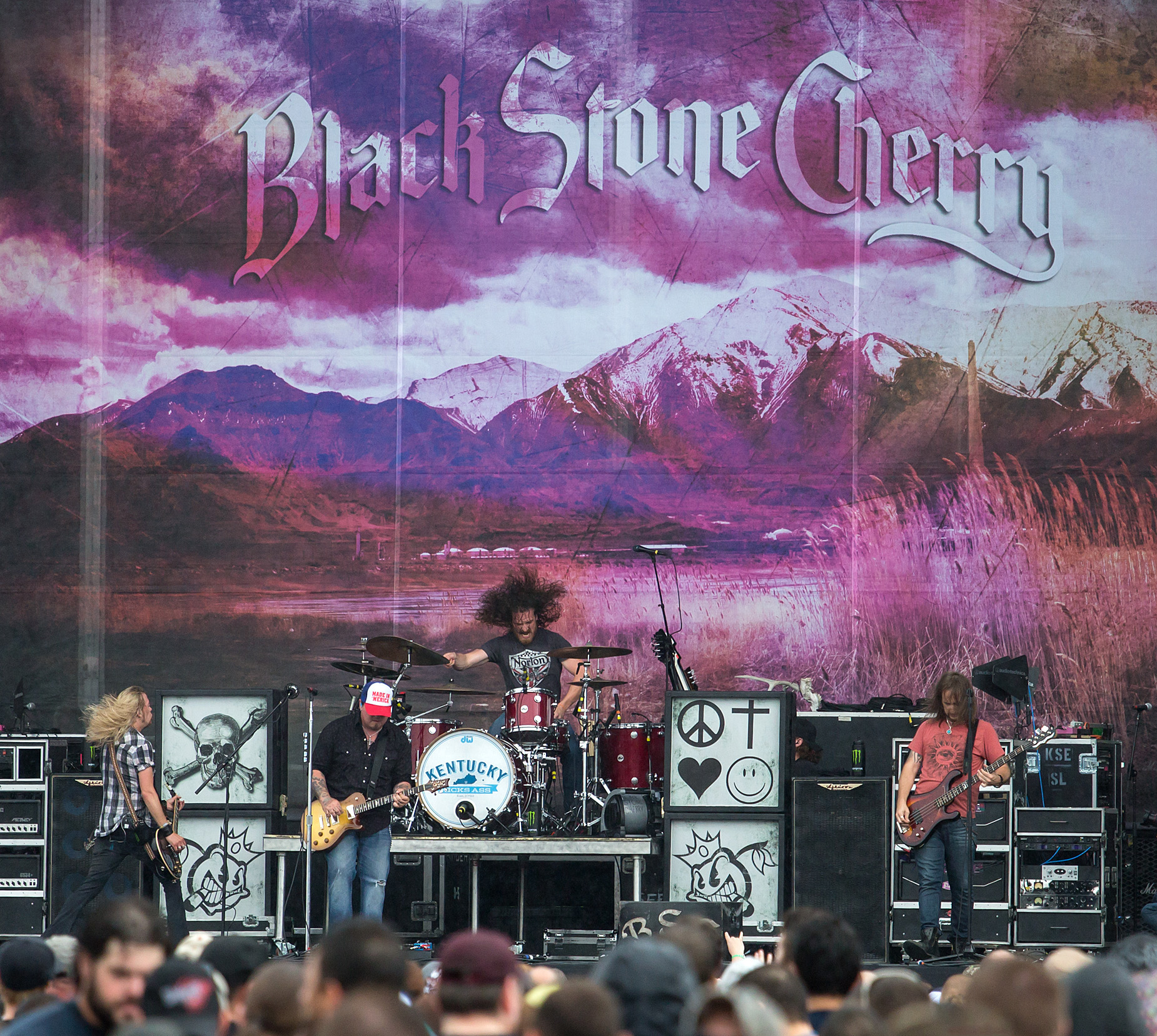
Black Stone Cherry achieved their third UK Rock & Metal Albums Chart number-one with Magic Mountain.

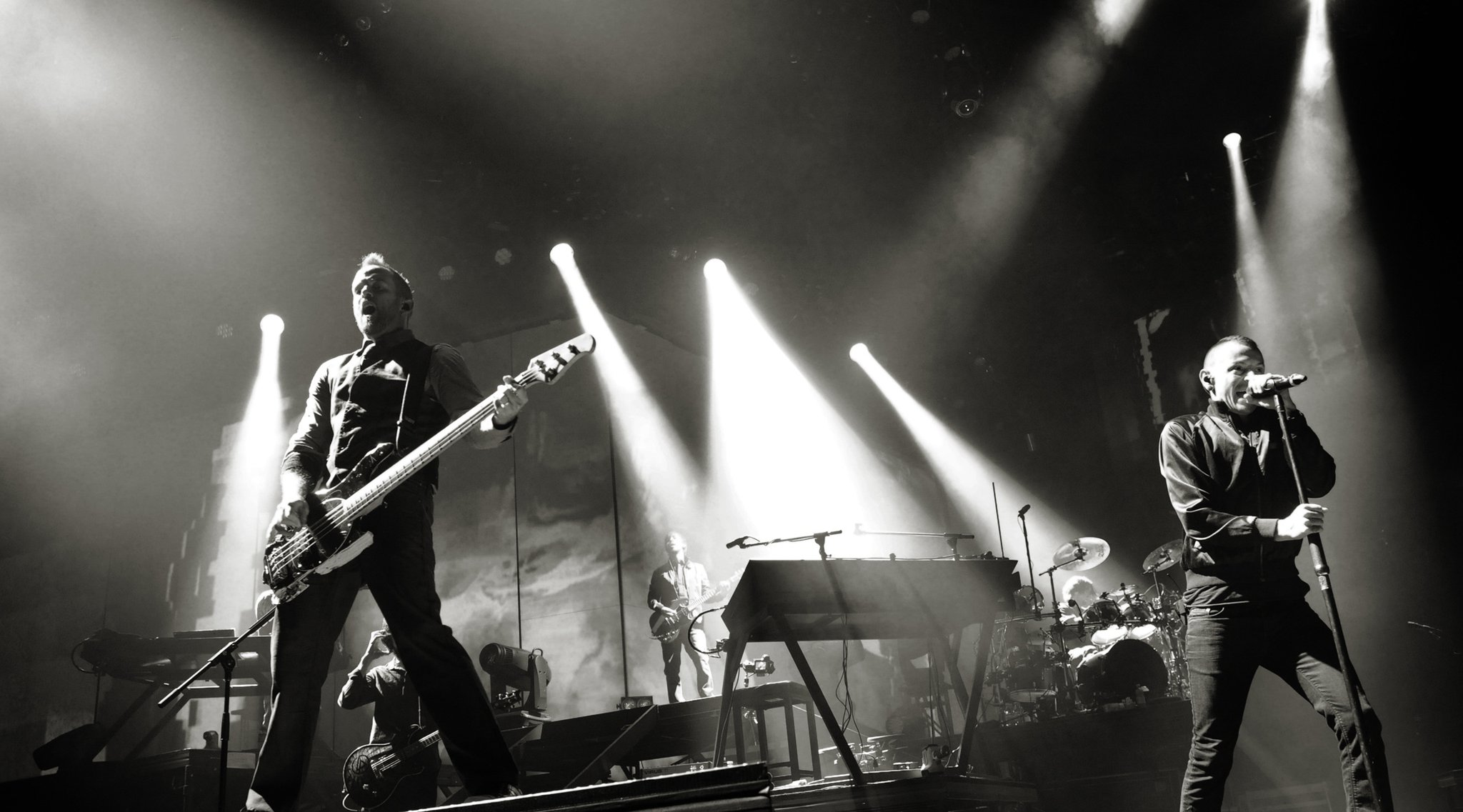
Linkin Park spent two weeks at number one in 2014 with their sixth studio album The Hunting Party.

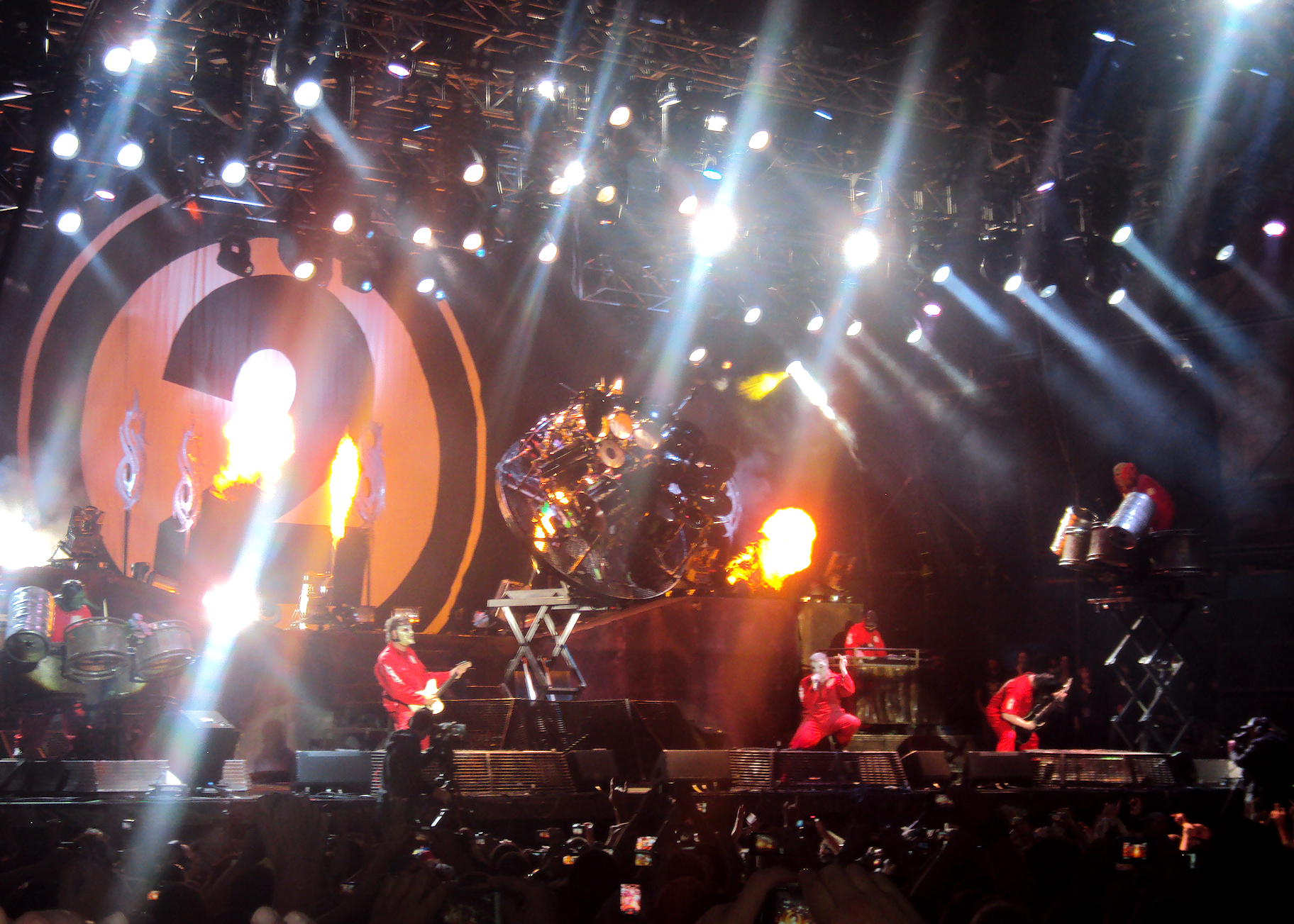
Slipknot's .5: The Gray Chapter spent two weeks at number one in 2014.

Key
†	Indicates best-selling rock album of 2014

Issue date	Album	Artist(s)	Record label(s)	Ref.
4 January	Greatest Hits	Foo Fighters	RCA	
11 January	...Like Clockwork	Queens of the Stone Age	Matador	
18 January	...Like Clockwork	Queens of the Stone Age	Matador	
25 January	Dark Days	Canterbury	Hassle	
1 February	Nevermind	Nirvana	Geffen	
8 February	Cavalier Youth	You Me at Six	BMG	
15 February	Hydra	Within Temptation	Dramatico	
22 February	Cavalier Youth	You Me at Six	BMG	
1 March	Weird Kids	We Are the In Crowd	Hopeless	
8 March	Cavalier Youth	You Me at Six	BMG	
15 March	English Oceans	Drive-By Truckers	ATO	
22 March	Lost Forever // Lost Together	Architects	Epitaph	
29 March	Going to Hell	The Pretty Reckless	Cooking Vinyl	
5 April	May Death Never Stop You	My Chemical Romance	Reprise	
12 April	All You Can Eat	Steel Panther	Open E	
19 April	Catacombs of the Black Vatican	Black Label Society	Mascot	
26 April	Cavalier Youth	You Me at Six	BMG	
3 May	Space Police: Defenders of the Crown	Edguy	Nuclear Blast	
10 May	Diploid Love	Brody Dalle	Queen of Hearts	
17 May	Magic Mountain	Black Stone Cherry	Roadrunner	
24 May	Magic Mountain	Black Stone Cherry	Roadrunner	
31 May	California Breed	California Breed	Frontiers	
7 June	Runes	Bury Tomorrow	Nuclear Blast	
14 June	Led Zeppelin	Led Zeppelin	Rhino	
21 June	Great Western Valkyrie	Rival Sons	Earache	
28 June	The Hunting Party	Linkin Park	Warner Bros.	
5 July	Once More 'Round the Sun	Mastodon	Reprise	
12 July	Metallica	Metallica	Vertigo	
19 July	The Hunting Party	Linkin Park	Warner Bros.	
26 July	Redeemer of Souls	Judas Priest	Columbia	
2 August	Similarities	Biffy Clyro	14th Floor	
9 August	Savages	Theory of a Deadman	Roadrunner	
16 August	Sunset on the Golden Age	Alestorm	Napalm	
23 August	Get Hurt	The Gaslight Anthem	Island	
30 August	Great Divide	Twin Atlantic	Red Bull	
6 September	Pale Communion	Opeth	Roadrunner	
13 September	The Day's War	Lonely the Brave	Hassle	
20 September	No Going Back	Stiff Little Fingers	Rigid Digits	
27 September	World on Fire	Slash; Myles Kennedy; The Conspirators	Roadrunner	
4 October	World on Fire	Slash; Myles Kennedy; The Conspirators	Roadrunner	
11 October	Hesitant Alien	Gerard Way	Reprise	
18 October	R-Kive	Genesis	Universal/Virgin	
25 October	World on Fire	Slash; Myles Kennedy; The Conspirators	Roadrunner	
1 November	.5: The Gray Chapter	Slipknot	Roadrunner	
8 November	Led Zeppelin IV	Led Zeppelin	Rhino	
15 November	.5: The Gray Chapter	Slipknot	Roadrunner	
22 November	The Endless River †	Pink Floyd	Rhino	
29 November	The Endless River †	Pink Floyd	Rhino	
6 December	The Endless River †	Pink Floyd	Rhino	
13 December	Rock or Bust	AC/DC	Columbia	
20 December	The Endless River †	Pink Floyd	Rhino	
27 December	The Endless River †	Pink Floyd	Rhino	

== See also ==
- 2014 in British music
- List of UK Rock & Metal Singles Chart number ones of 2014
