= David Wilson (director) =

- Born: Wells, Somerset, England
- Occupations: Director, animator
- Website: thisisdavidwilson.com

David Wilson is an English music video director and animator from Wells, Somerset, currently living in London.

Wilson studied Illustration at Brighton University and did a foundation course in Art and Design at St. Martin's. He is represented by the production company Riff Raff in the UK and The Directors Bureau in the U.S. . He has directed music videos for Arcade Fire, The Maccabees, David Guetta, Arctic Monkeys and Tame Impala.

== Filmography ==
=== Music videos ===
Year	Song title	Artist
2020	It's All So Incredibly Loud	Glass Animals
2018	"Money + Love"	Arcade Fire
2017	"Juice"	Chromeo
2017	"Do It, Try It"	M83
2015	"Disappointing"	John Grant
2015	"Let It Happen"	Tame Impala
2015	"Out of the Black"	Royal Blood
2014	"We Exist"	Arcade Fire
2013	"Do I Wanna Know?"	Arctic Monkeys
2013	"Mind Mischief"	Tame Impala
2012	"Take a Walk"	Passion Pit
2011	"Pelican"	The Maccabees
2011	"Titanium"	David Guetta
2011	"You Don't Know How Lucky You Are"	Keaton Henson
2011	"Let Go"	The Japanese Popstars
2011	"The Bay"	Metronomy
