= Figure It Out (Royal Blood song) =

Single by Royal Blood

from the album Royal Blood
- Released: 18 August 2014
- Recorded: 2013–14 at; Rockfield Studios; (Monmouth, Wales)
- Genre: Hard rock; garage rock
- Length: 3:04
- Label: Warner Bros.
- Songwriters: Mike Kerr; Ben Thatcher
- Producers: Tom Dalgety; Mike Kerr; Ben Thatcher

Royal Blood singles chronology
"Come On Over" (2014)	"Figure It Out" (2014)	"Ten Tonne Skeleton" (2014)

"Figure It Out" is a song written by Mike Kerr and Ben Thatcher of British rock duo Royal Blood. The song was originally recorded by the duo for the band's eponymous debut studio album, Royal Blood, where it appears as the third track on the album. It was released as the band's fourth single from the album by Black Mammoth Records and Warner Bros. Records on 18 August 2014.

Album artwork was designed from an original piece titled 'Deeps' by London-based artist Dan Hillier.

== Track listing ==
All tracks are written by Mike Kerr and Ben Thatcher. All tracks produced by Tom Dalgety with Kerr and Thatcher.

"Figure It Out" digital download
No.	Title	Length
1.	"Figure It Out"	3:04
Total length:		3:04

"Figure It Out" 7" (WEA494)
No.	Title	Length
1.	"Figure It Out"	3:04
2.	"Love and Leave It Alone"	3:31
Total length:		6:35

== Personnel ==
Partly adapted from Out of the Black liner notes.

Royal Blood

- Mike Kerr – lead vocals, bass guitar
- Ben Thatcher – drums

Technical personnel

- Tom Dalgety – producer, recording
- John Davis – mastering

== Charts ==
=== Weekly charts ===
Weekly chart performance for "Figure It Out"
Chart (2014–15)	Peak position
Belgium (Ultratop 50 Flanders)	46
Belgium (Ultratip Bubbling Under Wallonia)	48
Canada Rock (Billboard)	1
CIS Airplay (TopHit)	187
Mexico Ingles Airplay (Billboard)	39
Scottish Singles Sales (Official Charts)	38
UK Singles (Official Charts)	43
US Hot Rock & Alternative Songs (Billboard)	18
US Rock & Alternative Airplay (Billboard)	5

=== Year-end charts ===
Year-end chart performance for "Figure It Out"
Chart (2014)	Position
US Mainstream Rock (Billboard)	37

Chart (2015)	Position
US Hot Rock & Alternative Songs (Billboard)	74
US Rock Airplay (Billboard)	32

== Certifications ==
Certifications for "Figure It Out"
Region	Certification	Certified units/sales
Canada (Music Canada)	Platinum	80,000^{‡}
New Zealand (RMNZ)	Gold	15,000^{‡}
United Kingdom (BPI)	Platinum	600,000^{‡}
^{‡} Sales+streaming figures based on certification alone.

== Release history ==
Region	Date	Format	Label	Catalogue no.
Australia	18 July 2014	Digital download	Warner Bros.	none
France	18 July 2014	Digital download	Warner Bros.	none
United States	8 August 2014	Active rock radio	Warner Bros.	none
United Kingdom	17 August 2014	Digital download	Warner Bros.	none
United Kingdom	18 August 2014	7" vinyl	Warner Bros.	WEA494
United States	26 August 2014	Modern rock radio	Warner Bros.	none

== In popular culture ==
"Figure It Out" also appears on the soundtrack for the video game Pro Evolution Soccer 2016. The song also was used as the music in the trailer for the second series of the BBC One drama, Doctor Foster and for the Supernatural season 10 trailer and the 2014 British Touring Car Championship season montage. The song was also used in season one episode 11 of the TV show Gotham.

It was also used as the opening track in the Entourage movie.

In the lead up to the downfall of Gray Atkins, a serial killer in the British soap, EastEnders, "Figure It Out" is played while Kheerat Panesar is confronting Gray on the abuse of Gray's late wife, Chantelle, in the property of 1 Albert Square. The episode aired on 21 February 2022.
