= Back to the Water Below =

Studio album by Royal Blood
- Released: 1 September 2023
- Recorded: 2022
- Studios: RAK (London); Retreat Recording (Brighton)
- Genre: Hard rock
- Length: 31:22
- Label: Warner
- Producer: Royal Blood

Royal Blood chronology
Typhoons (2021)	Back to the Water Below (2023)	Dead Company (2026)

Singles from Back to the Water Below
- 1. "Mountains at Midnight" Released: 25 May 2023; 2. "Pull Me Through" Released: 13 July 2023

Back to the Water Below is the fourth studio album by English hard rock duo Royal Blood. It was released on 1 September 2023 by Warner Records. The album was self-produced, like the majority of their previous album, Typhoons (2021). It received critical acclaim and debuted at number one on the UK Albums Chart, making it their fourth consecutive number one album.

== Background ==
Back to the Water Below was recorded in Royal Blood's home studio in Brighton. Of the decision to produce the album themselves as opposed to minor input from outside producers as the band had done on their previous records, frontman Mike Kerr said in an interview with NME that the recording process allowed the band to "[force themselves] to do things that came naturally". The album title takes its name from a lyric in the song "Pull Me Through."

== Promotion ==
The band began teasing new music on Instagram on 12 May 2023, with the first in a series of videos being released showing work being done in the studio, such as demos of new riffs. On 25 May 2023, the album's lead single "Mountains at Midnight" was released alongside an accompanying music video. On 13 July 2023, the second and final single, "Pull Me Through", was released.

The band toured North America and Europe in support of the album, including as an opening act for Muse on their Will of the People World Tour in the summer. The band then embarked on their own headlining tour in the autumn.

== Bonus edition ==
The deluxe edition of Back to the Water Below was accompanied by a bonus 7" that included the two B-sides of the album, "Supermodel Avalanches" and "Everything's Fine".

Although fans received both bonus tracks well, "Supermodel Avalanches" was met with particularly high acclaim from fans of the band, who widely demanded the song be released officially on streaming services. After teasing the song online, the band debuted the song live on 15 November at a gig at the Crystal Ballroom in Portland. The song became a mainstay of the setlist, and on 19 December, the band released Back to the Water Below (Bonus Edition) onto all streaming services and platforms, which included "Supermodel Avalanches" as an eleventh bonus track. The release was presented as a Christmas gift, with the band wishing their fans a "Merry Riffmas" as a part of the release.

== Critical reception ==
Professional ratings
Aggregate scores
Source	Rating
Metacritic	81/100
Review scores
Source	Rating
DIY	4/5 stars
Far Out	3/5 stars
Kerrang!	4/5 stars
The Line of Best Fit	7/10
Mojo	4/5 stars
NME	4/5 stars
Rolling Stone	3/5 stars
The Telegraph	4/5 stars

Back to the Water Below received a score of 81 out of 100 on review aggregator Metacritic based on seven critics' reviews, indicating "universal acclaim". Mojo stated that it has "top-drawer tunes throughout", while Kerrang!'s Mark Sutherland noted that it "really ought to broaden Royal Blood's appeal still further" with its "tightly-wound riffing and ludicrous lyrics". Erica Campbell of NME described it as "an album that highlights the band's rock and roll instincts, self-knowledge and ability to generate something new with a bass, drums and zero hand holding".

Neil McCormick of The Telegraph summarised that "rock fans should be delighted that Kerr and Thatcher are still in the ring, giving it everything they've got" as "lyricist Kerr sounds like he has been in the wars" and "like a man undergoing changes, using music to understand himself". Finlay Holden of The Line of Best Fit called Back to the Water Below "simultaneously a refinement and expansion of the Royal Blood formula" as well as "a short and snappy experience". DIY's Sarah Jamieson felt that the duo "mov[e] away from the more shallow-sounding confines of its predecessor" and "manage to make a return to the towering riffs that populated their early releases, while adding some much-needed dynamism".

== Track listing ==
All lyrics are written by Mike Kerr; all music is composed by Royal Blood.

Back to the Water Below track listing
No.	Title	Length
1.	"Mountains at Midnight"	3:06
2.	"Shiner in the Dark"	3:27
3.	"Pull Me Through"	3:08
4.	"The Firing Line"	3:22
5.	"Tell Me When It's Too Late"	2:44
6.	"Triggers"	2:55
7.	"How Many More Times"	3:11
8.	"High Waters"	2:45
9.	"There Goes My Cool"	2:56
10.	"Waves"	3:48
Total length:		31:22

Japanese bonus track
No.	Title	Length
11.	"Honeybrains"	3:06

Deluxe edition bonus 7"
No.	Title	Length
1.	"Supermodel Avalanches"	3:05
2.	"Everything's Fine"	2:48

== Personnel ==
Royal Blood

- Mike Kerr – bass, vocals, backing vocals, piano, synths, keyboards, guitar; production
- Ben Thatcher – drums, percussion, production

Guest musicians

- Tom Hobden – violin and viola on "There Goes My Cool" and "Waves"
- Ian Burdge – cello on "Waves"

Technical

- Pete Hutchings – engineering
- Liam Hebb – engineering assistance
- Spike Stent – mixing
- Matt Wolach – mixing assistance
- Matt Colton – mastering
- Aidan Cochrane – creative direction and design
- Tom Beard – band photography

== Charts ==
=== Weekly charts ===
Weekly chart performance for Back to the Water Below
Chart (2023)	Peak position
Australian Albums (ARIA)	32
Austrian Albums (Ö3 Austria)	65
Belgian Albums (Ultratop Flanders)	6
Belgian Albums (Ultratop Wallonia)	10
Croatian International Albums (HDU)	10
Dutch Albums (Album Top 100)	19
French Albums (SNEP)	48
German Albums (Offizielle Top 100)	38
Hungarian Physical Albums (MAHASZ)	5
Irish Albums (IRMA)	51
New Zealand Albums (RMNZ)	17
Polish Albums (ZPAV)	54
Portuguese Albums (AFP)	16
Scottish Albums (Official Charts)	1
Spanish Albums (Promusicae)	64
Swiss Albums (Schweizer Hitparade)	9
UK Albums (Official Charts)	1
UK Rock & Metal Albums (Official Charts)	1

=== Year-end charts ===
Year-end chart performance for Back to the Water Below
Chart (2023)	Position
UK Official Record Stores (OCC)	7
