= Come On Over (Royal Blood song) =

Single by Royal Blood

from the album Out of the Black and Royal Blood
- Released: 21 April 2014
- Recorded: 2013–2014
- Studio: Rockfield (Monmouth, Wales)
- Genre: Hard rock; blues rock; psychedelic rock
- Length: 2:51
- Label: Warner Bros.
- Songwriter(s): Mike Kerr; Ben Thatcher
- Producer(s): Tom Dalgety; Mike Kerr; Ben Thatcher

Royal Blood singles chronology
"Little Monster" (2014)	"Come On Over" (2014)	"Figure It Out" (2014)

"Come On Over" is a song written by Mike Kerr and Ben Thatcher of British rock duo Royal Blood. The song was originally recorded by the duo for the band's debut single, "Out of the Black", where it appeared as the B-side. The track later appeared as the third track on the band's debut extended play Out of the Black, and as the second track on the band's eponymous debut studio album, Royal Blood. The track also appeared on the band's third single, released by Black Mammoth Records and Warner Bros. Records on 21 April 2014. "Come On Over" also appears on the soundtrack for WWE 2K15 and Guitar Hero Live.

== Track listing ==
All tracks are written by Mike Kerr and Ben Thatcher. All tracks produced by Tom Dalgety with Kerr and Thatcher

"Come On Over" digital download
No.	Title	Length
1.	"Come On Over"	2:51
Total length:		2:51

"Come On Over" 7-inch (WEA493)
No.	Title	Length
1.	"Come On Over"	2:51
2.	"You Want Me"	2:41
Total length:		5:31

== Personnel ==
Partly adapted from Out of the Black liner notes.

Royal Blood

- Mike Kerr – lead vocals, bass guitar
- Ben Thatcher – drums

Technical personnel

- Tom Dalgety – producer, recording
- John Davis – mastering
- Alan Moulder – mixing (track 1)

== Charts ==
Chart (2014)	Peak position
Mexico Ingles Airplay (Billboard)	36
UK Singles (OCC)	68

== Certifications ==
Region	Certification	Certified units/sales
United Kingdom (BPI)	Silver	200,000^{‡}
^{‡} Sales+streaming figures based on certification alone.

== Release history ==
Region	Date	Format	Label	Catalogue no.
Australia	21 April 2014	Digital download	Warner Bros.	none
France	21 April 2014	Digital download	Warner Bros.	none
United Kingdom	21 April 2014	Digital download	Warner Bros.	none
United Kingdom	9 June 2014	7" vinyl	Warner Bros.	WEA493
