= I Only Lie When I Love You =

Single by Royal Blood

from the album How Did We Get So Dark?
- Released: 8 June 2017
- Studio: ICP Studios (Brussels, Belgium)
- Genre: Hard rock; stoner rock
- Length: 2:49
- Label: Warner Bros.
- Composer: Royal Blood
- Lyricist: Mike Kerr
- Producers: Jolyon Thomas; Royal Blood; Tom Dalgety

Royal Blood singles chronology
"Lights Out" (2017)	"I Only Lie When I Love You" (2017)	"How Did We Get So Dark?" (2017)

Music video
- "I Only Lie When I Love You" on YouTube

"I Only Lie When I Love You" is a song by English hard rock band Royal Blood, released as the second overall single from their second studio album How Did We Get So Dark? on June 8, 2017.

The song was written by the band and was produced by Jolyon Thomas and Tom Dalgety with Royal Blood. It reached number one on the Billboard Mainstream Rock chart, becoming the band's second number one hit. It also reached number sixteen on the Billboard Alternative Songs chart, becoming the band's second-most-successful single on the latter chart.

== Promotion ==
The track was released as the third overall single from the band's second album How Did We Get So Dark? released on June 8, 2017. It was later serviced to U.S. rock radio formats as the second U.S. radio single on October 3, 2017.

On 16 January 2018, the band performed the song live on The Late Late Show with James Corden.

== Music video ==
The music video for "I Only Lie When I Love You" was released on June 8, 2017, and was directed by Pascal Teixeira. It features the band performing on a white backdrop and a rolling shot that features distorted angles of the band.

== Personnel ==
- Mike Kerr – vocals, bass, keyboards, production
- Ben Thatcher – drums, percussion, piano, production
- Jolyon Thomas – production, engineering
- Drew Bang – engineering
- Tom Dalgety – mixing

== Charts ==
=== Weekly charts ===
Weekly chart performance for "I Only Lie When I Love You"
Chart (2017–18)	Peak position
Belgium (Ultratip Bubbling Under Flanders)	8
Canada Rock (Billboard)	2
UK Rock & Metal (OCC)	2
US Hot Rock & Alternative Songs (Billboard)	19
US Rock Airplay (Billboard)	8

=== Year-end charts ===
Year-end chart performance for "I Only Lie When I Love You"
Chart (2018)	Position
US Hot Rock & Alternative Songs (Billboard)	78

== Certifications ==
Certifications for "I Only Lie When I Love You"
Region	Certification	Certified units/sales
United Kingdom (BPI)	Silver	200,000^{‡}
^{‡} Sales+streaming figures based on certification alone.
