= How Did We Get So Dark? =

Studio album by Royal Blood
- Released: 16 June 2017
- Recorded: 2016–2017
- Studios: ICP (Brussels); RAK (London)
- Genres: Hard rock; blues rock; garage rock; stoner rock; alternative rock
- Length: 34:25
- Label: Warner Bros.
- Producers: Royal Blood; Jolyon Thomas; Tom Dalgety

Royal Blood chronology
Royal Blood (2014)	How Did We Get So Dark? (2017)	Typhoons (2021)

Singles from How Did We Get So Dark?
- 1. "Lights Out" Released: 13 April 2017; 2. "I Only Lie When I Love You" Released: 8 June 2017; 3. "How Did We Get So Dark?" Released: 20 October 2017; 4. "Hole in Your Heart" Released: 20 March 2018

How Did We Get So Dark? is the second studio album by the British hard rock duo Royal Blood. It was released on 16 June 2017, through Warner Bros. Records. The band, alongside Tom Dalgety, return as producers from the self-titled debut album, but with the addition of Joylon Thomas. He helped make alterations to the duo's sound, such as harmonies, keyboards, and outsider songwriters, while retaining their hard rock roots.

How Did We Get So Dark? received generally positive reviews from critics, and became the band's second consecutive UK number one album.

== Background ==
Royal Blood's self-titled debut album was released in 2014, a time when mainstream rock was scarce. The duo's expectations were low, yet it sold nearly 66,000 copies in the first week, making in the fastest-selling rock debut album in the country since Noel Gallagher's High Flying Birds' self-titled debut album in 2011. Royal Blood soon became one of the biggest names in rock and embarked on two and a half years of touring. "We weren't ever expecting things to happen so quickly and so fast," bassist and vocalist Mike Kerr says. This, combined with pressure from people like Jimmy Page- "they’re going to take rock into a new realm," led many to predict the duo was headed for a sophomore slump.

One of the main challenges Royal Blood faced recording their second album was a new environment. This is evident from the first song recorded for it, "Hook, Line and Sinker" which the duo debuted at Reading and Leeds Festival in 2015. They had gotten bored of playing the same ten songs, with Kerr adding "we were so desperate to play it, so we did." They cautiously chose a recording studio, trying sessions in England, Nashville and Los Angeles before deciding on one in Brussels with about 50 song ideas. "It probably took a bit longer than we thought or were planning it to take," admits Kerr. "But I think it was all the better for it. We needed a bit of a time out."

They recruited Joylon Thomas in hopes of building upon their established sound. "We wanted to progress," Kerr says, but not end up making "a kind of weird reggae record." Soul and gospel backup singers were brought in for harmonies but "it wasn't quite right," according to Kerr. Instead, he recorded both backing and lead vocals and layered them on top of each other. Thomas also thought about "other singers and other textures" but concluded part of Royal Blood's character is that there are "just two guys." The only other adjustments to Royal Blood's to make the album are some keyboard parts and songwriters John Barrett and Patrik Berger contributing to three songs, "Lights Out", "Don't Tell" and "Sleep".

== Composition ==
How Did We Get So Dark? is stylistically similar to the duo's self-titled debut album, with Geoff Jenke of Eventalaide describing both as featuring a "mixture of hard blues, stoner rock and hard rock with a little bit of psychedelic rock and pop." Polly Glass of Classic Rock similarly felt it continued Royal Blood's "grizzled blues rock tropes," where as WERS noted more variance in the duo's melodies while keeping their "signature garage-rock sound."

== Critical reception ==
Professional ratings
Aggregate scores
Source	Rating
AnyDecentMusic?	6.4/10
Metacritic	71/100
Review scores
Source	Rating
AllMusic	4/5 stars
Classic Rock	4/5 stars
Dork	4/5 stars
Exclaim!	6/10
Financial Times	4/5 stars
MusicOMH	3.5/5 stars
NME	4/5 stars
The Spill Magazine	5/5 stars

The album received generally positive reviews from music critics, attaining a Metacritic aggregate score of 71.

How Did We Get So Dark was elected by Loudwire as the 7th best hard rock album of 2017, and Craig Clemens of RX Music listed it as a runner-up for the best alternative rock album of 2017.

== Track listing ==
All lyrics are written by Mike Kerr; all music is composed by Royal Blood, except where noted.

No.	Title	Lyrics	Music	Length
1.	"How Did We Get So Dark?"			3:17
2.	"Lights Out"	Mike Kerr; John Barrett	Royal Blood; John Barrett	3:57
3.	"I Only Lie When I Love You"			2:49
4.	"She's Creeping"			3:23
5.	"Look Like You Know"			3:05
6.	"Where Are You Now?"			2:46
7.	"Don't Tell"	Mike Kerr; John Barrett	Royal Blood; John Barrett	3:38
8.	"Hook, Line & Sinker"			3:28
9.	"Hole in Your Heart"			3:46
10.	"Sleep"		Royal Blood; Patrick Berger	4:16
Total length:				34:25

Super deluxe vinyl bonus 7"
No.	Title	Length
11.	"Cheap Affection"	2:55
12.	"Half the Chance"	3:18
Total length:		40:38

== Personnel ==
Credits adapted from the album's booklet.

Royal Blood

- Mike Kerr – bass, keyboards, vocals, production
- Ben Thatcher – drums, percussion, piano, production

Production

- Tom Dalgety – production, engineering, mixing
- Jolyon Thomas – production, engineering
- Brian Lucey – mastering
- Justin Smith – engineering
- Drew Bang – engineering

Imagery

- Adrian Samson – photography
- Pascal Teixeira – art direction
- Richard Welland – design
- We Three Club – tiger design

== Charts ==
=== Weekly charts ===
Chart (2017)	Peak position
Australian Albums (ARIA)	4
Austrian Albums (Ö3 Austria)	13
Belgian Albums (Ultratop Flanders)	2
Belgian Albums (Ultratop Wallonia)	2
Canadian Albums (Billboard)	8
Czech Albums (ČNS IFPI)	43
Dutch Albums (Album Top 100)	8
Finnish Albums (Suomen virallinen lista)	28
French Albums (SNEP)	37
German Albums (Offizielle Top 100)	17
Greek Albums (IFPI)	19
Irish Albums (IRMA)	4
Italian Albums (FIMI)	29
New Zealand Albums (RMNZ)	6
Polish Albums (ZPAV)	23
Portuguese Albums (AFP)	8
Scottish Albums (Official Charts)	1
Spanish Albums (PROMUSICAE)	25
Swiss Albums (Schweizer Hitparade)	4
UK Albums (Official Charts)	1
UK Rock & Metal Albums (Official Charts)	1
US Billboard 200	25
US Top Rock Albums (Billboard)	6

=== Year-end charts ===
Chart (2017)	Position
Belgian Albums (Ultratop Flanders)	31
Belgian Albums (Ultratop Wallonia)	112
UK Albums (OCC)	39
