= Dead Company =

Studio album by Royal Blood
- Released: 6 November 2026
- Studio: Sound City
- Length: 32:45
- Label: Warner
- Producers: Royal Blood (Note: Tracks 1–9); Tom Dalgety (Note: Track 10)

Royal Blood chronology
Back to the Water Below (2023)	Dead Company (2026)

Singles from Dead Company
- 1. "Ten Over Ten" Released: 12 August 2026; 2. "Swallow the Bomb" Released: 16 September 2026; 3. "Dead Company" Released: 6 October 2026; 4. "Mother Never Told You" Released: 4 November 2026

Dead Company is the fifth studio album by the English rock duo Royal Blood. It was released on 6 November 2026 through Warner Records. Self-produced by the band, the album has been preceded by the singles "Ten Over Ten", "Swallow the Bomb", "Dead Company" and "Mother Never Told You". The album debuted at number two on the UK Albums Chart, losing the top spot to James Blunt's Airplane Mode, making it their first album not to debut at number one.

== Background and release ==
In September 2023, the band released their fourth studio album, Back to the Water Below, and toured in support of the album extensively from May 2023 through August 2024. Following the tour, the band took a small break, but announced in a statement at the end of 2025 that they "Can't wait to see you all again soon".

In June 2026, the band began to tease new music online, and subsequently announced a small set of three UK shows for the summer, stating that they would "play you a couple of new songs". On 12 August, the band released the lead single "Ten Over Ten", and announced the album's title and release date of 13 November. The album was self-produced by the band, who called the production style "anti-production" due to its raw and stripped-back nature.

Royal Blood announced on 21 August that they would be supporting the album with a UK headlining tour in the winter, debuting song "Swallow the Bomb" in a Pukkelpop concert on the same day. On 24 August, the band played a concert in Dreamland, Margate and debuted "Dead Company". Both songs were eventually released as the second and third singles of the album on 16 September and 6 October respectively, with "Dead Company" additionally featuring on the soundtrack of EA Sports FC 27.

The release date for Dead Company would later be brought forward to 6 November, with the fourth single, "Mother Never Told You", being released on 4 November.

== Critical reception ==
Professional ratings
Aggregate scores
Source	Rating
Metacritic	75/100
Review scores
Source	Rating
AllMusic	3.5/5 stars
God Is in the TV	8/10
Kerrang!	4/5
NME	4/5 stars
Riff Magazine	7/10
The Skinny	3/5 stars
Spill Magazine	9/10
Sputnikmusic	3.5/5
Stereoboard	4/5 stars
Uncut	7/10

According to the review aggregator Metacritic, Dead Company received "generally favorable reviews" based on a weighted average score of 75 out of 100 from seven critic scores.

== Track listing ==
All music is composed by Royal Blood

No.	Title	Length
1.	"Dead Company"	3:20
2.	"Swallow the Bomb"	3:19
3.	"Ten Over Ten"	3:17
4.	"Mother Never Told You"	3:00
5.	"Nowhere All Along"	3:50
6.	"Ride"	3:30
7.	"Rear View Mirror"	2:51
8.	"Take 'Em All"	3:09
9.	"Tapping Out"	2:45
10.	"The Closer"	3:44
Total length:		32:45

== Personnel ==
These credits are adapted from Tidal.

=== Royal Blood ===
- Mike Kerr – bass, vocals (all tracks); backing vocals (except 3); production (tracks 1–9); Wurlitzer (3); keyboards (5 and 9); synthesizer (8); baritone guitar, Mellotron, additional production (10)
- Ben Thatcher – drums, percussion (all tracks); production (1–9); additional production (10)

=== Additional contributors ===
- Pete Hutchings – co-production, engineering (1–9); additional production (10)
- Matt Colton – mastering
- Alan Moulder – mixing (1–4, 6)
- Finn Howells – mixing assistance (1–4, 6), mixing (5, 7–10)
- Nick Raskulinecz – additional production (6)
- Chris Holmes – engineering (6)
- Tom Dalgety – production, engineering (10)
- Joe Jones – engineering (10)

== Charts ==
Chart performance for Dead Company
Chart (2026)	Peak position
Australian Albums (ARIA)	37
Austrian Albums (Ö3 Austria)	25
Belgian Albums (Ultratop Flanders)	3
Belgian Albums (Ultratop Wallonia)	16
Dutch Albums (Album Top 100)	26
French Albums (SNEP)	60
French Rock & Metal Albums (SNEP)	5
German Albums (Offizielle Top 100)	34
German Rock & Metal Albums (Offizielle Top 100)	16
Hungarian Albums (MAHASZ)	26
New Zealand Albums (RMNZ)	40
Portuguese Albums (AFP)	129
Scottish Albums (Official Charts)	2
Swiss Albums (Schweizer Hitparade)	11
UK Albums (Official Charts)	2
UK Rock & Metal Albums (Official Charts)	1
US Top Album Sales (Billboard)	44
