= 2014 in British music =

This is a summary of the year 2014 in British music.

== Events ==
- 6 January – Sir Thomas Allen is revealed as the winner of the 2013 Queen's Medal for Music.
- 9 January – The list of nominees for the 2014 Brit Awards is published. Nominees for Best British Group are Arctic Monkeys, Bastille, Disclosure, One Direction and Rudimental.
- 19 February – Brit Awards ceremony takes place at the O2 Arena, London.
- 22 March – Kate Bush announces a tour – her first live tour dates since the only tour of her career in 1979.
- 1 April – A 90th birthday concert for Sir Neville Marriner is held by the Academy of St Martin in the Fields at the Royal Festival Hall, with soloists Joshua Bell and Murray Perahia.
- 21 April – Ralph Vaughan Williams' "The Lark Ascending" returns to the top spot in the Classic FM Hall of Fame.
- 28 April – Julian Lloyd Webber announces his retirement from playing cello and performance owing to a herniated disc in his neck which has reduced the power of his bowing arm.
- 30 April – Michael Nyman's 70th birthday is celebrated with a concert at London's Southbank Centre.
- 10 May – A judge rules that a music industry investment scheme. in which Gary Barlow and other members of Take That invested heavily was set up for the purpose of avoiding tax. HMRC indicate that they will be pursuing Barlow and others for repayment of the taxes they had sought to avoid paying. Those involved included the band's manager Jonathan Wild.
- 13–16 June – Download Festival 2014 takes place at Donington Park in Leicestershire. The Stephen Sutton main stage is headlined by Avenged Sevenfold, Linkin Park and Aerosmith, the Zippo encore stage by The Offspring, Status Quo and Trivium, the Pepsi Max stage by Opeth, Behemoth and The Dillinger Escape Plan, the Red Bull Studios Live stage by Dan Reed Network, SikTh and Zebrahead, and the Jägermeister acoustic stage by Jamie Lenman, Ginger Wildheart and Nick Oliveri.
- 3 July – Arcade Fire's headlining set at British Summer Time—"the concert of the summer"—takes place in Hyde Park, London.
- 6 July – Audio streaming becomes incorporated into the UK Singles Chart
- 24 September – Jason Orange announces his decision to leave Take That.
- 27 September – Katherine Jenkins marries Andrew Levitas at Hampton Court Palace.
- 12 December – The Andrew Lloyd Webber musical Cats returns to the West End after an absence of 12 years.
- 14 December – Ben Haenow wins the eleventh series of The X Factor. Fleur East is named runner-up, while Andrea Faustini and Lauren Platt finish in third and fourth place respectively.
- December – A copy of "Open the Door to Your Heart" by Darrell Banks on London Records issued in 1967, sells for over £14,500. This is the highest sum ever paid for a UK-released single.
- Undated – London drill rapper Cassiel Wuta-Ofei of 67 is issued with a 2-year anti-social behaviour order (ASBO) preventing him performing as Scribz, hence he changes his alias to LD.

== Television series ==
- April – BBC Four screens Rule Britannia! Music, Mischief and Morals in the 18th Century, presented by Suzy Klein.
- 30 August – The eleventh series of The X Factor begins on ITV.
- 16 November – Dancing Cheek to Cheek, a history of dance presented by Len Goodman and Lucy Worsley, begins on BBC4.

== Films ==
- God Help the Girl, written and directed by Stuart Murdoch. and starring Olly Alexander

== Artists/Groups reformed ==
- Hurricane#1
- The Libertines
- Ride
- S Club 7
- Slowdive

== Groups disbanded ==
- Beady Eye
- Hard-Fi
- Jethro Tull
- Jim Jones Revue
- Jonathan and Charlotte
- LFO
- LostAlone
- Luminites
- Miss Dynamix
- Morning Parade
- The Move
- Orbital
- Twisted Wheel

== Classical works ==
- Robin Holloway – Europa and the Bull, Opus 121, for Tuba and Orchestra
- Karl Jenkins – The Healer – A Cantata for St Luke

== Opera ==
- John Metcalf – Under Milk Wood: An Opera

== Musical theatre ==
- Made in Dagenham, with music by David Arnold, lyrics by Richard Thomas, and a book by Richard Bean
- Sunny Afternoon, with music and lyrics by Ray Davies and book by Joe Penhall

== Film scores and incidental music ==
=== Film ===
- Rupert Gregson-Williams – Postman Pat: The Movie
- David Holmes – '71
- Henry Jackman – Kingsman: The Secret Service
- Edward Shearmur – Before I Go to Sleep
- Gary Yershon – Mr. Turner

=== Television ===
- Martin Phipps – The Honourable Woman

== British music awards ==
=== BRIT Awards ===
The 2014 BRIT Awards were held on 19 February 2014 at The O2 Arena, London and hosted by James Corden.

- Best Producer: Flood and Alan Moulder
- British Breakthrough Act: Bastille
- British Female Solo Artist: Ellie Goulding
- British Group: Arctic Monkeys
- British Male Solo Artist: David Bowie
- British Single: "Waiting All Night" – Rudimental featuring Ella Eyre
- British Video: "Best Song Ever" – One Direction
- Critics' Choice Award: Sam Smith
- International Female Solo Artist: Lorde
- International Group: Daft Punk
- International Male Solo Artist: Bruno Mars
- MasterCard British Album of the Year: AM – Arctic Monkeys

=== Ivor Novello Awards ===
The 59th Ivor Novello Awards were held on 22 May 2014 at the Grosvenor House Hotel, London.

- PRS for Music Most Performed Work: "Let Her Go" – Passenger (written by Mike Rosenberg)
- The Ivors Classical Music Award: John McCabe
- Best Television Soundtrack: Ripper Street (composed by Dominik Scherrer)
- Best Contemporary Song: "Retrograde" – James Blake (written by James Blake)
- International Achievement: Mumford & Sons
- Best Original Film Score: The Epic of Everest (composed by Simon Fisher Turner)
- The Ivors Inspiration Award: Jerry Dammers
- Album Award: Push the Sky Away – Nick Cave and the Bad Seeds (written by Nick Cave and Warren Ellis)
- PRS for Music Outstanding Contribution to British Music: Jeff Beck
- Best Song Musically and Lyrically: "Strong" – London Grammar (written by Dominic Major, Hannah Reid and Daniel Rothman)
- Songwriter of the Year: Tom Odell
- Outstanding Song Collection: The Chemical Brothers
- Lifetime Achievement: Christine McVie
- PRS for Music Special International Award: Nile Rodgers

=== Mercury Prize ===
The 2014 Barclaycard Mercury Prize was awarded on 29 October 2014 to Young Fathers for their album Dead.

=== Popjustice £20 Music Prize ===
The 2014 Popjustice £20 Music Prize was awarded on 29 October 2014 to Little Mix for their song "Move".

== Deaths ==
- 13 January – Ronny Jordan, British guitarist, 51
- 5 February – Samantha Juste, English-American singer and television host, 69
- 17 February – Frank Wappat, DJ and singer, 84
- 25 February – Peter Callander, English songwriter and record producer, 74
- 5 March – Dave Sampson, English singer, 73
- 6 March – Marion Stein (Thorpe), British pianist, 87
- 2 April – Lyndsie Holland, English actress and singer, 75
- 7 April – John Shirley-Quirk, operatic bass-baritone, 83
- 16 April – Stan Kelly-Bootle, songwriter, author and computer engineer, 84
- 18 April – Brian Priestman, conductor (Denver Symphony Orchestra), 87
- 23 April – Patric Standford, composer, 75
- 6 May – Antony Hopkins, composer, conductor and pianist, 93
- 7 May – Sir George Christie, manager of Glyndebourne Opera, 79
- 14 May
  - Douglas Cummings, cellist (London Symphony Orchestra), 67.
  - Jeffrey Kruger, music business executive, 83
- 27 May – Malcolm MacDonald, music critic, 66
- 20 June – David Brown, musicologist and Tchaikovsky specialist, 84
- 9 July
  - John Spinks, guitarist and songwriter (The Outfield), 60
  - Ken Thorne, English-American composer, 90
- 21 August – Jean Redpath, folk singer-songwriter, 77
- 28 August – Glenn Cornick, bassist (Jethro Tull), 67
- 1 October – Lynsey de Paul, singer-songwriter, 64 (brain haemorrhage)
- 2 October
  - Rob Skipper, guitarist (The Holloways), 28
  - The Spaceape, hyperdub artist (cancer)
- 6 October – Andrew Kerr, co-founder of the Glastonbury Festival, 80
- 8 October – Mark Bell, house music producer (LFO), 43 (complications from surgery)
- 19 October – Raphael Ravenscroft, saxophonist, 60 (heart attack)
- 23 October – Alvin Stardust, singer, 72
- 25 October – Jack Bruce, bassist (Cream), 71
- 31 October – Ian Fraser, composer and conductor, 81
- 2 November – Acker Bilk, clarinettist and vocalist, 85
- 6 November – Maggie Boyle, folk singer and musician, 57 (cancer)
- 8 November – Ivey Dickson, second musical director of the National Youth Orchestra of Great Britain
- 14 November – Mike Burney, jazz saxophonist, 70
- 15 November – Cherry Wainer, South African-born organist (Lord Rockingham's XI), 79
- 17 November – Jeff Fletcher, guitarist (Northern Uproar), 36
- 20 November – Arthur Butterworth, English composer and conductor, 91
- 23 November – Clive Palmer, banjo player, 71
- 2 December – Nick Talbot, singer-songwriter (Gravenhurst), 37
- 3 December – Ian McLagan, keyboardist (Small Faces), 69 (stroke)
- 22 December – Joe Cocker, singer, 70
- 23 December – Jeremy Lloyd, comedy writer and songwriter (Captain Beaky and His Band), 84 (pneumonia)

== See also ==
- 2014 in British radio
- 2014 in British television
- 2014 in the United Kingdom
- List of British films of 2014
