= Out of the Black (EP) =

EP by Royal Blood
- Released: 11 March 2014
- Recorded: 2013–14 at; Rockfield Studios; (Monmouth, Wales)
- Genres: Hard rock; blues rock; garage rock; stoner rock
- Length: 14:54
- Label: Warner Bros.
- Producers: Tom Dalgety; Mike Kerr; Ben Thatcher

Royal Blood chronology
Out of the Black (2014)	Royal Blood (2014)

Singles from Out of the Black
- 1. "Out of the Black" Released: 22 November 2013; 2. "Little Monster" Released: 10 February 2014; 3. "Come On Over" Released: 21 April 2014

Out of the Black is the debut extended play and major label release by the British hard rock duo Royal Blood. The four-track EP, self-produced by the band with Tom Dalgety, was released by Black Mammoth and Warner Bros. Records on 11 March 2014 in the United States. The first three songs appeared on their self-titled debut album that was released later that year. "Hole" was later released as a B-side to the single "Little Monster".

== Track listing ==
All tracks are written by Mike Kerr and Ben Thatcher. All tracks produced by Tom Dalgety with Kerr and Thatcher.

No.	Title	Length
1.	"Out of the Black"	4:00
2.	"Little Monster"	3:32
3.	"Come On Over"	2:51
4.	"Hole"	4:31
Total length:		14:54

== Personnel ==
Partly adapted from Out of the Black liner notes.

Royal Blood

- Mike Kerr – lead vocals, bass guitar
- Ben Thatcher – drums

Technical personnel

- Tom Dalgety – producer, mixing (track 1), recording
- John Davis – mastering
- Alan Moulder – mixing (track 3)
- Dave Sardy – mixing (track 2)

== Release history ==
Region	Date	Format	Label
United States	11 March 2014	Digital download	Black Mammoth; Warner Bros.
