= Royal Blood (album) =

- Cover by Dan Hillier

Studio album by Royal Blood
- Released: 22 August 2014
- Recorded: 2013–2014
- Studio: Rockfield (Monmouth)
- Genres: Hard rock; stoner rock; blues rock; garage rock
- Length: 32:38
- Label: Warner Bros.
- Producers: Tom Dalgety; Mike Kerr; Ben Thatcher

Royal Blood chronology
Out of the Black (2014)	Royal Blood (2014)	How Did We Get So Dark? (2017)

Singles from Royal Blood
- 1. "Figure It Out" Released: 18 August 2014; 2. "Ten Tonne Skeleton" Released: 1 December 2014

Alternative cover
- 10th anniversary edition cover

Royal Blood is the debut studio album by English rock duo Royal Blood. It was released on 22 August 2014, through Warner Bros. Records. The album was produced by the band alongside Tom Dalgety.

Upon release, Royal Blood received positive reviews from critics. It was nominated for the 2014 Mercury Prize and the Brit Award for British Album of the Year at the 2015 Brit Awards, where the duo won Best British Group. It debuted at number one on the UK Albums Chart, becoming the fastest-selling British rock debut album in the UK in three years, and also topped the charts in Ireland and Scotland, while also reaching the top 10 in Switzerland, Australia and New Zealand. A 10th-anniversary edition of the album with bonus tracks was released on 16 August 2024.

== Background ==
Royal Blood was formed in 2011 by bassist and lead vocalist Mike Kerr and drummer Ben Thatcher. The pair had known each other since their teenage years and had been playing in various bands together and independently, with Kerr previously serving as a member of British rock band Hunting the Minotaur. With ideas for new songs and "a bass sound", Kerr formed the band with Thatcher after a nine-month tenure in Australia, meeting him at the airport and arranging rehearsals the next day and playing a concert to their friends in a local bar in Brighton.

After spending time in the recording studio, the band started to gain mainstream attention in the summer of 2013, when their songs, such as "Out of the Black" and "Come On Over", were first sent to the radio for airplay, and after a promotional stunt where Arctic Monkeys drummer Matt Helders wore a Royal Blood T-shirt during the band's performance at Glastonbury. Both bands share the same management company. Additionally, the band was nominated by the BBC, along with fourteen other acts, for their Sound of 2014, however they lost out to British singer Sam Smith.

"Blood Hands" was featured prominently in The Divergent Series: Insurgent.

== Recording ==
The recording of the album was kept under strict conditions, with the band essentially recording the album with only Mike Kerr's vocals and bass guitar and Ben Thatcher's drum kit, with the exception of shakers and tambourines on some of the album's tracks. The production of the album did not involve the use of samples or overdubbing, which meant that most of the album's material was recorded in one take, thus producing a more natural sound as opposed to the popular method of recording various takes and combining them in the final mix.

== Critical reception ==
Professional ratings
Aggregate scores
Source	Rating
AnyDecentMusic?	6.9/10
Metacritic	77/100
Review scores
Source	Rating
AllMusic	4/5 stars
The Daily Telegraph	4/5 stars
DIY	4/5 stars
The Guardian	3/5 stars
Mojo	3/5 stars
The New Zealand Herald	4/5 stars
NME	8/10
Pitchfork	5.6/10
Q	4/5 stars
Uncut	8/10

Upon its release, Royal Blood was met with positive reviews from music critics. Positive consensus on the album was that it was well-produced and backed strongly by high quality songwriting both lyrically and musically. Criticism of the album was predominantly based around the lack of deviation sonically from the standard rock music formula. At Metacritic, which assigns a normalized rating out of 100 to reviews from mainstream critics, the album received an average score of 77, which indicates "generally favorable reviews", based on 15 reviews.

It was elected by Loudwire as the 5th best Rock album of 2014.

Ben Patashnik of British music magazine NME gave Royal Blood a largely positive review, describing the record as having "light, shade and careful nuance throughout" and stating that it was a "turbo-bastard of a rock record". Praising the album's composition and sound, he went on to write that while the album may not revolutionise rock music, the album has potential to extend the boundaries of rock music from its small share in mainstream media. He additionally stated, "Unconcerned with anything other than how fun the shared language of rock can be, Royal Blood is here to convince everyone in its path that loud is good". Stephen Ackroyd, the editor of British music magazine DIY, also gave the album a largely positive review, describing the album as not being "a cooler than thou indie band masquerading as something heavier", and stating that "Royal Blood can mix it". In contrast to Patashnik's review for NME, Ackroyd believes that the album would go on to bring rock music back to the forefront of mainstream media.

For what feels like eons, anyone with more than a passing interest in rock music – proper rock music – has not-so-quietly been praying for a saviour. A homegrown concern who might have a chance of punching through to prove that Britain can still raise hell. Their faith is rewarded, Royal Blood will save us all.

— Stephen Ackroyd

Chris Schulz of Auckland-based daily newspaper The New Zealand Herald commented on the effort put in by Kerr and Thatcher in sounding like a full band, describing the duo's sound as "a simple formula done with impressive clarity and at huge volumes" and that "it's a major surprise to discover that Royal Blood consists of just two people". He gave Royal Blood a positive four-star review, writing that "it's hard to pick favourites when every song is backed by riffs you'll want to air guitar along to until the final chords of "Better Strangers" ring out" and jokingly stating, "Someone better warn Jack White that these new kids on the rock block mean business". Harriet Gibsone of London-based daily national newspaper The Guardian gave the album a moderately positive three-star review. Comparing the album to early-2000s rock bands such as Death from Above 1979 and The Vines, while also comparing the album's guitar riffs to the sound of "Jack White drunk at a saloon bar", she wrote that "It's heavy and hefty enough to crown them kings of the commercial rock scene, but then, who is going to stand in their way?".

Kitty Empire of The Guardian sister newspaper The Observer gave a less positive review than her Guardian counterpart, also giving the album three stars. She made comparisons between Kerr's vocals and bass work to that of Jack White and Josh Homme, commenting that Kerr's channeling of Homme's vocals "actually sounds pretty great, not least because it's been a while since the Queens have made a record you could dance to". She closed her review with a moderately positive note, writing that, "Happily, their self-titled debut album sounds just like it should: a muscular expansion on the sound of their four preceding singles and EP. They're not a patch on their illustrious predecessors yet. Hell, they're not a patch on Deap Vally, but debt is a funny thing in rock. A great deal of it can be written off if the end result is a pleasure". Michael Palmer of music website The Line of Best Fit gave the album a mixed review, highlighting that "Royal Blood’s debut is an easily digestible, unfortunately thin-sounding, slightly disappointing rock record and an exciting, fresh, invigorating pop record both at the same time".

Jessica Goodman and Ryan Kistobak of The Huffington Post included the album on their list of 2014's best releases, saying that "it should be recognized as good for all parties".

The album artwork is by London-based contemporary artist Dan Hillier, from an original work titled 'Pachamama', the Quechuan word for Mother Earth. The artwork went on to win the award for 'Best Art Vinyl' in 2014.

"Ten Tonne Skeleton" was released as the album's latest single on 1 December 2014. This was released as a limited 7-inch limited edition vinyl with B-side "One Trick Pony". as well as being released to radio. "Ten Tonne Skeleton" was A-listed on BBC radio 1 and also went on to top the Kerrang! Radio Charts in January 2015 after 10 weeks on the chart.

== Track listing ==
All tracks are written by Mike Kerr and Ben Thatcher. All lyrics are written by Mike Kerr. All tracks produced by Tom Dalgety with Kerr and Thatcher.

Royal Blood track listing
No.	Title	Length
1.	"Out of the Black"	4:00
2.	"Come On Over"	2:51
3.	"Figure It Out"	3:04
4.	"You Can Be So Cruel"	2:44
5.	"Blood Hands"	3:07
6.	"Little Monster"	3:32
7.	"Loose Change"	2:35
8.	"Careless"	3:21
9.	"Ten Tonne Skeleton"	3:07
10.	"Better Strangers"	4:12
Total length:		32:38

Japanese edition
No.	Title	Length
11.	"Hole"	4:32
12.	"You Want Me"	2:43
13.	"Love and Leave It Alone"	3:24
Total length:		43:17

10th Anniversary edition
No.	Title	Length
11.	"One Trick Pony"	3:33
12.	"You Want Me"	2:42
13.	"Love and Leave It Alone"	3:23
14.	"Sleeptalker"	3:09
15.	"Ten Tonne Skeleton (Tom Dalgety Mix)"	3:39
16.	"Hole"	4:31
17.	"Figure It Out (Live from T In the Park 2015)"	3:24
18.	"Loose Change (Live from Reading Festival 2015)"	2:44
19.	"Little Monster (Live from Reading Festival 2015)"	4:59
20.	"Better Strangers (Live from Bonnaroo 2015)"	4:59
21.	"Out of the Black (Live from Reading 2015)"	5:50
Total length:		75:32

== Personnel ==
Partly adapted from Out of the Black liner notes.

Royal Blood

- Mike Kerr – lead vocals, bass guitar
- Ben Thatcher – drums

Technical personnel

- Tom Dalgety – production, mixing (tracks 1, 3, 5, 7, 10), recording
- John Davis – mastering
- Alan Moulder – mixing (track 2)
- Dave Sardy – mixing (track 6)

== Charts ==
=== Weekly charts ===
Weekly chart performance for Royal Blood
Chart (2014–24)	Peak position
Australian Albums (ARIA)	3
Austrian Albums (Ö3 Austria)	24
Belgian Albums (Ultratop Flanders)	16
Belgian Albums (Ultratop Wallonia)	31
Canadian Albums (Billboard)	9
Danish Albums (Hitlisten)	18
Dutch Albums (Album Top 100)	13
Finnish Albums (Suomen virallinen lista)	14
French Albums (SNEP)	48
German Albums (Offizielle Top 100)	40
Hungarian Physical Albums (MAHASZ)	17
Irish Albums (IRMA)	1
Italian Albums (FIMI)	83
New Zealand Albums (RMNZ)	6
Norwegian Albums (VG-lista)	14
Scottish Albums (Official Charts)	1
Swiss Albums (Schweizer Hitparade)	6
UK Albums (Official Charts)	1
US Billboard 200	17
US Top Alternative Albums (Billboard)	2
US Top Rock Albums (Billboard)	4
US Top Hard Rock Albums (Billboard)	1

=== Year-end charts ===
Year-end chart performance for Royal Blood
Chart (2014)	Position
Belgian Albums (Ultratop Flanders)	59
Belgian Albums (Ultratop Wallonia)	184
UK Albums (OCC)	22
US Top Hard Rock Albums (Billboard)	44

Chart (2015)	Position
Belgian Albums (Ultratop Flanders)	23
Belgian Albums (Ultratop Wallonia)	164
UK Albums (OCC)	22
US Top Rock Albums (Billboard)	53

== Certifications ==
Certifications for Royal Blood
Region	Certification	Certified units/sales
Australia (ARIA)	Gold	35,000^{^}
Canada (Music Canada)	Gold	40,000^{^}
New Zealand (RMNZ)	Platinum	15,000^{‡}
United Kingdom (BPI)	2× Platinum	600,000^{‡}
^{^} Shipments figures based on certification alone.^{‡} Sales+streaming figures based on certification alone.

== Release history ==
Release history and formats for Royal Blood
Region	Date	Format	Label	Ref.
Australia	22 August 2014	CD; digital download	Warner Bros.	
Germany	22 August 2014	Digital download	Warner Bros.	
United Kingdom	25 August 2014	CD; digital download; vinyl	Warner Bros.	
United States	26 August 2014	CD; digital download; vinyl	Warner Bros.	
