= Little Monster (song) =

Single by Royal Blood

from the album Out of the Black and Royal Blood
- Released: 10 February 2014
- Recorded: 2013–14
- Studio: Rockfield Studios, Monmouth, Wales
- Genre: Stoner rock; hard rock; blues rock; alternative metal; garage rock
- Length: 3:32
- Label: Warner Bros.
- Songwriters: Mike Kerr; Ben Thatcher
- Producers: Tom Dalgety; Mike Kerr; Ben Thatcher

Royal Blood singles chronology
"Out of the Black" (2013)	"Little Monster" (2014)	"Come On Over" (2014)

Music video
- "Little Monster" on YouTube

"Little Monster" is a song by the English hard rock duo Royal Blood. Written by both members, it was released as their second single on 10 February 2014. It marked the band's first release under Warner Bros. Records after signing with the label in 2013. The song later appeared on the band's debut extended play Out of the Black, and on their first full-length album Royal Blood.

== Composition ==
"Little Monster" has been described as stoner rock, hard rock, blues rock, alternative metal and garage rock.

== Track listing ==
All tracks are written by Mike Kerr and Ben Thatcher. All tracks produced by Tom Dalgety with Kerr and Thatcher.

"Little Monster" digital download
No.	Title	Length
1.	"Little Monster"	3:32
Total length:		3:32

"Little Monster" 7" (WEA491)
No.	Title	Length
1.	"Little Monster"	3:32
2.	"Hole"	4:31
Total length:		8:03

== Personnel ==
Partly adapted from Out of the Black liner notes.

Royal Blood

- Mike Kerr – lead vocals, bass guitar
- Ben Thatcher – drums

Technical personnel

- Tom Dalgety – producer, recording
- John Davis – mastering
- Dave Sardy – mixing

== Charts ==
=== Weekly charts ===
Weekly chart performance for "Little Monster"
Chart (2014–15)	Peak position
Scotland (OCC)	88
UK Singles (Official Charts)	74
UK Rock & Metal (Official Charts)	1
US Hot Rock & Alternative Songs (Billboard)	33
US Rock & Alternative Airplay (Billboard)	8

=== Year-end charts ===
Year-end chart performance for "Little Monster"
Chart (2015)	Position
US Rock Airplay (Billboard)	42

== Certifications ==
Certifications for "Little Monster"
Region	Certification	Certified units/sales
Canada (Music Canada)	Gold	40,000^{‡}
New Zealand (RMNZ)	Gold	15,000^{‡}
United Kingdom (BPI)	Gold	400,000^{‡}
^{‡} Sales+streaming figures based on certification alone.

== Release history ==
Region	Date	Format	Label	Catalogue no.
Australia	10 February 2014	Digital download	Warner Bros.	none
France	10 February 2014	Digital download	Warner Bros.	none
United Kingdom	12 February 2014	Digital download	Warner Bros.	none
United Kingdom	31 March 2014	7" vinyl	Black Mammoth; Warner Bros.	WEA491
United States	10 March 2015	Modern rock radio	Warner Bros.	none
