= Out of the Black (song) =

Single by Royal Blood

from the album Out of the Black and Royal Blood
- Released: 22 November 2013
- Recorded: Rockfield Studios (Monmouth, Wales)
- Genre: Hard rock; stoner rock; alternative metal; garage rock
- Length: 4:00
- Label: Black Mammoth
- Songwriters: Mike Kerr; Ben Thatcher
- Producers: Tom Dalgety; Mike Kerr; Ben Thatcher

Royal Blood singles chronology
"Out of the Black" (2013)	"Little Monster" (2014)

"Out of the Black" is a song by the English hard rock duo Royal Blood. Written by both members, it was released as their debut single on 22 November 13 through their independent label, Black Mammoth. They signed with Warner Bros. Records soon after, who rereleased the song in 2014; first on their debut extended play, Out of the Black, and then on their first full-length album, Royal Blood.

"Out of the Black" received a music video in 2015 to coincide with its appearance on the soundtrack to the film Who Am I. It also served as the official theme song for the 2016 professional wrestling event WWE Roadblock.

== Music video ==
A music video for the song was released on 6 February 2015. It was directed by David Wilson and Christy Karacas and mixes live-action footage with animation. In the video, a robber wearing a bunny costume steals various confectionaries from a petrol station, including a chocolate bar directly from the station's attendant. When the police respond, the robber is revealed to be an alien and, along with other aliens in costumes, massacres a team of men in black who arrive on the scene. The aliens, however, are subsequently slaughtered in a fight with the attendant, who kills the alien in the bunny costume last and takes back his chocolate bar.

== Critical reception ==
Scott Kerr of AllMusic, no relation to the band's frontman Mike Kerr, called the song "a riff-fueled onslaught that belies their two-piece status; with just a heavily processed bass guitar and a drum set between them, they make some four-piece rock bands look inconsequential". DIY editor Stephen Ackroyd repeated what Kerr said, calling the song "an incendiary calling card - a roaring, snarling Godzilla levelling skyscrapers at will".

== Track listing ==
All tracks are written by Mike Kerr and Ben Thatcher. All tracks produced by Tom Dalgety with Kerr and Thatcher.

"Out of the Black" 7" (BMR001)
No.	Title	Length
1.	"Out of the Black"	4:00
2.	"Come On Over"	2:51
Total length:		6:51

== Personnel ==
Partly adapted from Out of the Black liner notes.

Royal Blood

- Mike Kerr – lead vocals, bass guitar
- Ben Thatcher – drums

Technical personnel

- Tom Dalgety – producer, mixing (track 1), recording
- John Davis – mastering
- Alan Moulder – mixing (track 2)

== Charts ==
=== Weekly charts ===
Weekly chart performance for "Out of the Black"
Chart (2013–15)	Peak position
Australia Hitseekers (ARIA)	18
Canada Rock (Billboard)	35
Mexico Ingles Airplay (Billboard)	41
Scottish Singles Sales (Official Charts)	64
UK Singles (Official Charts)	78
UK Rock & Metal (Official Charts)	1
US Hot Rock & Alternative Songs (Billboard)	47
US Rock & Alternative Airplay (Billboard)	13

=== Year-end charts ===
Year-end chart performance for "Out of the Black"
Chart (2014)	Position
US Rock Airplay (Billboard)	40

== Certifications ==
Certifications for "Out of the Black"
Region	Certification	Certified units/sales
Canada (Music Canada)	Gold	40,000^{‡}
New Zealand (RMNZ)	Gold	15,000^{‡}
United Kingdom (BPI)	Gold	400,000^{‡}
^{‡} Sales+streaming figures based on certification alone.

== Release history ==
Region	Date	Format	Label	Catalogue no.
United Kingdom	11 November 2013	7" vinyl	Black Mammoth	BMR001
United States	18 March 2014	Modern rock radio	Warner Bros.	none
