= Royal Blood (band) =

English rock duo

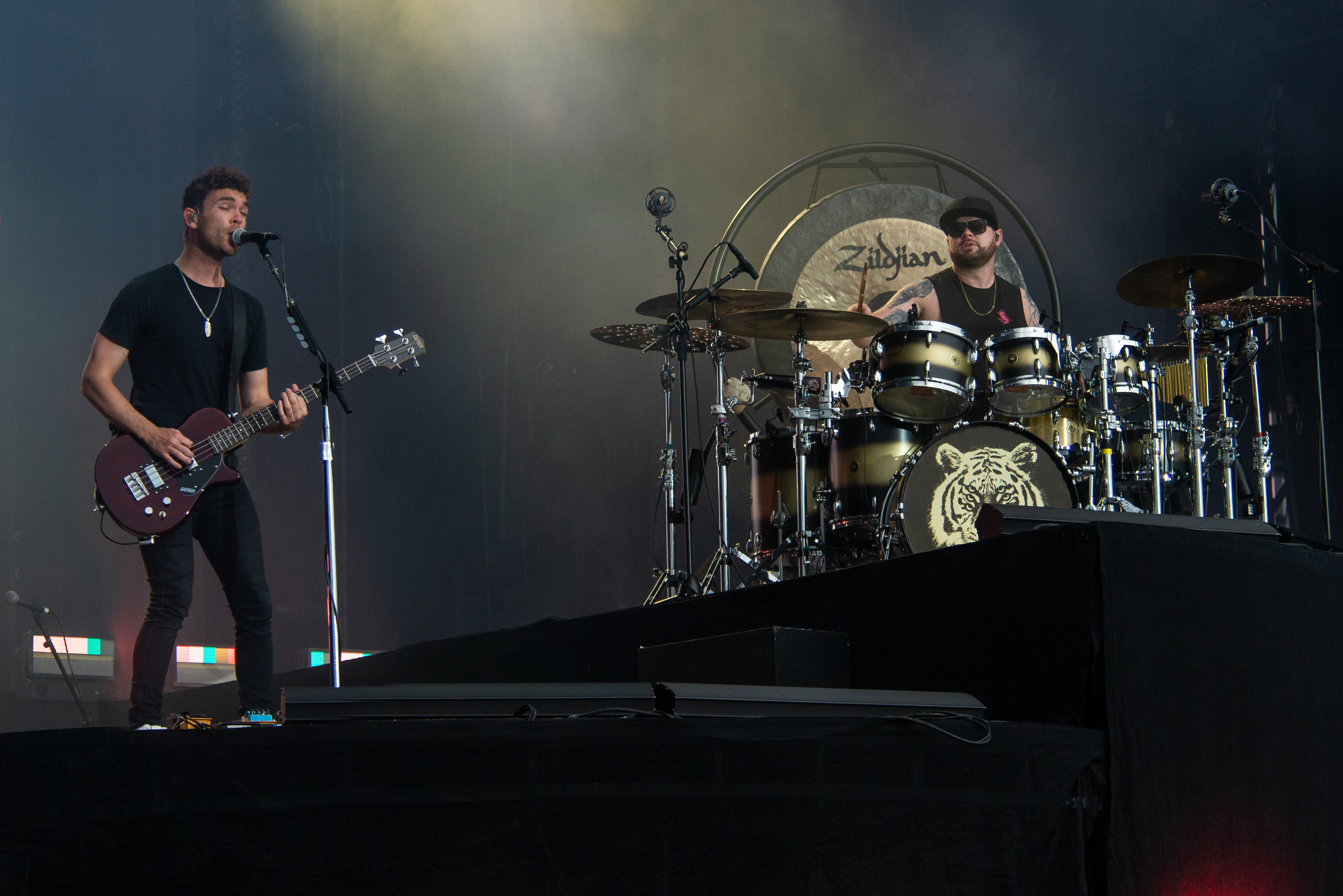
- Royal Blood performing in June 2022

Background information
- Origin: Worthing, England
- Genres: Hard rock; blues rock; garage rock; stoner rock; alternative rock
- Years active: 2011–present
- Labels: Warner; Black Mammoth
- Members: Mike Kerr; Ben Thatcher
- Past members: Matt Swan; Joe Dennis
- Website: royalbloodband.com

Royal Blood are an English rock duo formed in Worthing in 2011. The lineup consists of Mike Kerr (vocals, bass guitar, keyboards) and Ben Thatcher (drums). Their signature sound is built around Kerr's bass playing style, which sees him using various effects pedals and amps to make his bass guitar sound like an electric guitar and bass guitar at the same time. The duo were signed by Warner Chappell Music in 2013 and have since released five studio albums: Royal Blood (2014), How Did We Get So Dark? (2017), Typhoons (2021), Back to the Water Below (2023) and Dead Company (2026).

== History ==
=== 2011–2015: Formation and debut album ===
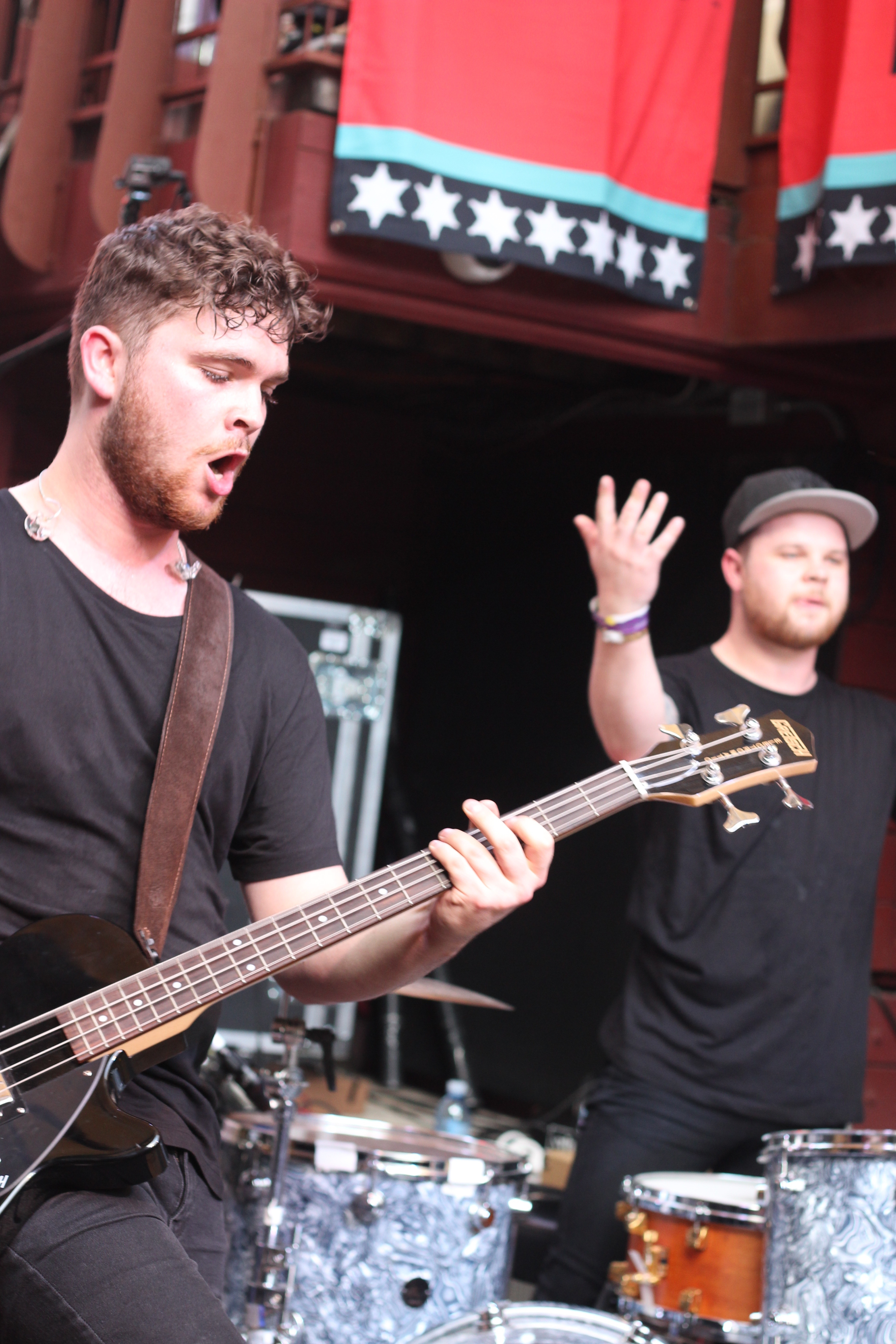
Royal Blood performing in March 2014

Royal Blood consists of vocalist and bassist Mike Kerr (born 19 June 1990) from Worthing and drummer Ben Thatcher (born 12 February 1988) from Rustington. They first met around 2005 when they were teenagers; for a brief period, they were part of the same four-piece band called Flavour Country, for which Kerr was the keyboardist and keytarist.

Royal Blood formed in Worthing in March 2011, after Kerr met original drummer Matt Swan. The band were initially a trio consisting of Kerr on vocals and bass, Joe Dennis on guitar, and Matt Swan on drums. Dennis left in early 2012, leading the band to discover what is now their signature sound, as Kerr's unique bass playing style (which sees him using various effects pedals and amps to make his bass guitar sound like an electric guitar and bass guitar at the same time) became the main focus. They relocated to Swan's home country of Australia, where they recorded an EP in Brisbane. The first single, "Leaving", premiered on Australian radio station Triple J in 2012; Kerr and Thatcher later recorded a new version of the song and renamed it "Come On Over". Kerr and Swan played around the Brisbane and Gold Coast area, before Kerr eventually decided to return to Worthing, ending this incarnation of the band. He was picked up at the airport by Thatcher, and the two decided to continue under the Royal Blood name together with Thatcher replacing Swan on drums.

Initially, the new duo "couldn't get a gig in Worthing for months" and "ended up just playing a lot of open-mic nights with acoustic singer-songwriters". The band developed their music in the studios of Brighton Electric, and it was during this time that they were signed by Warner Chappell Music. They joined the same management company as the band Arctic Monkeys. In 2013, Arctic Monkeys' drummer Matt Helders was seen wearing a Royal Blood shirt during Arctic Monkeys' performance at Glastonbury Festival, boosting interest in the band. At Glastonbury Festival 2023, Thatcher returned the favour, wearing an Arctic Monkeys T-shirt whilst playing their set on the Pyramid Stage, as the act before the Arctic Monkeys headlined the same stage.

On 11 November 2013, Royal Blood released their official debut single, "Out of the Black", which came with the B-side of the re-recorded "Come On Over". In November 2013, it was announced that Royal Blood would be supporting Arctic Monkeys for two Finsbury Park shows in May 2014. In December 2013, Royal Blood were nominated for BBC Sound of 2014. Royal Blood released their second single, "Little Monster", on 11 February 2014. The band also released a four-track EP Out of the Black, featuring "Out of the Black", "Little Monster", "Come On Over" and "Hole" on 11 March 2014 in North America.

Royal Blood performed at South by Southwest in Austin, Texas in March 2014; at Liverpool Sound City festival and at BBC Radio 1's Big Weekend in Glasgow in May; and at Download Festival and Glastonbury Festival in June. They performed at Rock Werchter and T in the Park festival in July, and at Reading Festival, but got cut short at their Leeds Festival show, as well as Osheaga in August 2014.

Their debut album, Royal Blood, was released on 25 August 2014 on Warner Bros. Records. Well received by critics, it was verified by the Official Charts Company as the fastest-selling British rock debut album in three years in the UK. The cover artwork, by London-based contemporary artist Dan Hillier, won the Best Art Vinyl award in 2014. A video clip for "Out of the Black" entered rotation as part of cable network AXN Japan's "AXN Tunes" programme in October 2014; music videos aired on-the-hour as filler, in between their regularly scheduled timetabled programming.

In October 2014, Royal Blood announced details of their biggest European tour to date, starting in Germany on 10 January, and ending in Sweden on 23 March. The band, along with Iggy Pop, supported Foo Fighters on selected dates during their 2015 UK, US and Canada tours. In February 2015, at the Brit Awards in London, Jimmy Page presented them with the Best British Group Award. In April 2015, they played the Coachella Festival in California, in June 2015 they played twice at Rock Werchter and at Bunbury Music Festival in Cincinnati and, in September 2015, they played at the Rock in Rio festival, in Rio de Janeiro.

On 29 and 30 August 2015, Royal Blood played the main stage at Reading and Leeds 2015. During both of these performances, the band revealed a new song titled "Hook, Line & Sinker". In October 2015, the band had finished touring for their debut album. The song "Careless" is used as the opening theme of the French version of the TV show Tattoo Fixers.

=== 2016–2018: How Did We Get So Dark? ===
On 29 March 2016, the band released a new track, "Where Are You Now?", inspired by the American TV series Vinyl. The song was later re-recorded during the making of their second album How Did We Get So Dark?

On 16 October 2016, a video was uploaded to the band's official Instagram account showing the band in the studio. The video showed Mike Kerr playing the Robbie Williams track "Let Me Entertain You" on piano, with Ben Thatcher recording the video and singing. The video was captioned "Day 1. Robbie Williams #royalblooddocovers". They then continued these short covers on Instagram, covering songs from Vanessa Carlton, Gloria Gaynor, Spandau Ballet, Elton John, Coldplay, and Michael Jackson.

Following its announcement on 11 April 2017, Royal Blood released their second album, How Did We Get So Dark? on 16 June 2017, preceded by the singles "Lights Out", "Hook, Line & Sinker" and "I Only Lie When I Love You". It debuted at number one on the UK Albums Chart. Royal Blood were part of the WayHome Music & Arts Festival 2017 Line-up in Oro-Medonte, Ontario. In April 2017, Royal Blood announced four UK shows, starting in Cambridge on 17 May and ending in Leicester on 20 May. In June 2017, Royal Blood played at Glastonbury on the Pyramid Stage. In addition, on 5 June, the band announced a tour in Europe on their social media, which took place throughout October and November 2017. In May 2018, Royal Blood went on a headlining US tour in continued support of their second album, which included more acts alongside Queens of the Stone Age.

=== 2019–2022: Typhoons ===
In June 2019, Kerr and Thatcher presented Jimmy Page with the Icon Award at the Kerrang! Awards. The following month, Royal Blood debuted two new songs, "Boilermaker" and "King", in Wiesbaden, Germany. In March 2020, the band announced they had begun recording their third studio album, though production was delayed due to the COVID-19 pandemic. On 24 September 2020, the band released "Trouble's Coming", the first single from their third studio album Typhoons. In October 2020, the single was featured as a part of both the NHL 21 and FIFA 21 soundtracks. As well as the NASCAR 21: Ignition soundtrack.

On 21 January 2021, the second single "Typhoons" was released, along with the announcement of the album itself, which was released on 30 April 2021 and features the previously previewed track "Boilermaker". Royal Blood contributed a cover of the Metallica song "Sad But True" to the charity tribute album The Metallica Blacklist, released in September 2021. On 18 March 2022, the band surprise-released the single "Honeybrains".

=== 2023–2025: Back to the Water Below ===
On 23 May 2023, Royal Blood announced the single "Mountains at Midnight" would be released on 25 May 2023. The band also announced their next album, Back to the Water Below, was to be released on 8 September 2023. The release date was later brought forward to 1 September 2023.

The band received some criticism for calling the energy level from the Dundee crowd "pathetic" on 29 May 2023 after playing a live show for BBC Radio 1's Big Weekend. There have been conflicting opinions on the incident, with some commentators speaking out in defence of the band.

In summer 2023, Royal Blood supported Muse on the Will of the People world tour in the UK and France. They also embarked on their own headlining tour to promote the album.

To complement the more dance and electronic-oriented sounds of later albums, the band are supported live for additional synths/keyboards/vocoder, currently by Darren James.

=== 2026–present: Dead Company ===
On 12 August 2026, Royal Blood announced their fifth album, Dead Company, due for release 6 November 2026. The lead single "Ten Over Ten" was released on the same day as the announcement.

== Influences ==
Royal Blood have cited influences including Foo Fighters, the Dead Weather, the Raconteurs, Black Sabbath, Kendrick Lamar, Pharoahe Monch, Daft Punk, Justice, Bee Gees, Dua Lipa, Goldfrapp, St. Vincent, ZZ Top, Turbowolf, Tame Impala, Queen, Led Zeppelin, Queens of the Stone Age, Nirvana, Red Hot Chili Peppers, T. Rex and the Beatles.

== Band members ==
Current members

- Mike Kerr – vocals, bass (2011–present), keyboards, piano (2017–present), guitar (2016, 2022–2023)
- Ben Thatcher – drums, percussion (2013–present), piano (2017–2018)

Current touring musicians

- Darren James – keyboards, synthesizers, piano, vocoder, tambourine, backing vocals (2021–present)

Former members

- Matt Swan – drums, percussion (2011–2013)
- Joe Dennis – guitar (2011–2012)

Former touring musicians

- Jodie Scantlebury – backing vocals, electronic drums (2017–2018, 2020–2022)
- Zarif Davidson – backing vocals, electronic drums (2017–2018, 2020–2022)

== Discography ==
- Royal Blood (2014)
- How Did We Get So Dark? (2017)
- Typhoons (2021)
- Back to the Water Below (2023)
- Dead Company (2026)

== Awards and nominations ==
Year	Organisation	Award	Result	Ref.
2014	BBC	Sound of 2014	Nominated	
2014	Mercury Prize	Album of the Year	Nominated	
2015	NME Awards	Best Live Band	Won	
2015	NME Awards	Best New Band	Won	
2015	Brit Awards	Best British Group	Won	
2015	Kerrang! Awards	Best British Newcomer	Won	
2015	MTV Europe Music Awards	Best Rock	Nominated	
2015	MTV Europe Music Awards	Best Push Act	Nominated	
2015	Q Awards	Best Live Act	Won	
2015	Classic Rock Magazine Awards	Album of the Year	Nominated	
2015	GMA Awards; Global Metal Apocalypse	Breakthrough Non-Metal band/artist	Won	
2015	UK Music Video Awards	Best Rock/Indie Video – UK	Won	
2015	UK Music Video Awards	Best Animation In A Video	Won	
2015	UK Music Video Awards	Best Editing In A Video	Won	
2016	NME Awards	Best British Band	Nominated	
2016	NME Awards	Best Live Band	Nominated	
2017	LOS40 Music Awards	LOS40 Blackjack Artist Award	Nominated	
2017	MTV Europe Music Awards	Best Rock	Nominated	
2017	UK Music Video Awards	Best Rock/Indie Video – UK	Won	
2017	UK Music Video Awards	Best Visual Effects in a Video	Nominated	
2018	Brit Awards	Best British Group	Nominated	
2018	Kerrang! Awards	Best British Band	Nominated	
2018	UK Music Video Awards	Best Rock/Indie Video – UK	Nominated	
2018	UK Music Video Awards	Best Live Concert	Nominated	
