= Sebastian discography =

This is the discography for French electronic musician Sébastien Akchoté, better known as SebastiAn.

== Studio albums ==
List of studio albums, with selected chart positions
Title	Album details	Peak chart positions		
Title	Album details	FRA	UK Dance	US Dance
Total	Released: 30 May 2011; Label: Ed Banger, Because Music; Formats: CD, LP, digital download	63	22	20
Thirst	Released: 8 November 2019; Label: Ed Banger, Because Music; Formats: CD, LP, digital download	90	—	—

== Compilations ==
Title	Details	Peak chart positions
Title	Details	FRA
Ross Ross Ross / Productions & Remixes	Released: 28 August 2006; Label: Ed Banger, Because Music; Format: Promo CD	—
Remixes	Released: 2 September 2008; Label: Ed Banger, Because Music; Formats: 12-inch, CD, digital download	103
SAINT LAURENT SHOWS	Released: 19 December 2023 (Updated on streaming services with each new show); Label: Ed Banger, Because Music; Formats: Digital download	—

== Extended plays and singles ==
Year	Title	Tracks	Format	Label	Catalogue
2005	Smoking Kills	"Smoking Kills (?)", "Dolami", "Shoot"	12"	Ed Banger	ED006
2005	H.A.L.	"H.A.L.", (split with Time Period by Krazy Baldhead)	7"	Ed Banger	LTED002
2006	Ross Ross Ross	"Ross Ross Ross", "Head/Off", "Walkman"	12"	Ed Banger, Because; Music	ED011
2007	Walkman 2	"Walkman (Re-Edit)", "Killing in the Name of Sebastian"	12"	Ed Banger, Because; Music	BEC5772152
2008	Motor	"Motor", "Momy", "Army"	12", CD	Ed Banger, Because; Music	ED023
2011	Embody	"Embody", "Embody (DJ Premier 95 Break Remix)", "Embody (Kavinsky Remix)"	Digital download, 12", CD	Ed Banger, Because; Music	ED046
2011	C.T.F.O. (featuring M.I.A.)	"C.T.F.O.", "C.T.F.O. (Nero Remix)", "C.T.F.O. (DMX Krew Remix)"	Digital download, 12", CD	Ed Banger, Because; Music	ED051
2011	Love in Motion (featuring Mayer Hawthorne)	"Love in Motion", "Love in Motion (Skrillex's Funkt-Out Mix)", "Love in Motion (Rustie Remix)"	Digital download, 12", CD	Ed Banger, Because; Music	ED053
2012	The EP Collection	"Holloback", "Organia", (includes all tracks from Embody, C.T.F.O., and Love in Motion)	Digital download, 12"	Ed Banger, Because; Music	ED059

== Singles ==
Title	Year	Peak chart positions	Album
Title	Year	FRA	Album
"Embody"	2012	90	Total
"Tetra"	2012	87	Total
"Odd Look" (Kavinsky featuring SebastiAn)	2013	46	Outrun
"Thirst"	2019	—	Thirst
"Run for Me" (Edit) (featuring Gallant)	2019	—	Thirst
"Beograd" (Edit)	2019	—	Thirst
"Better Now" (Edit) (featuring Mayer Hawthorne)	2019	—	Thirst
"Sober" (featuring Bakar)	2019	—	Thirst
"What a Wonderful World" (featuring Ehla)	2023	—	Non-album single
"Love Triangle" (Angèle featuring Caroline Polachek and SebastiAn)	2026	—	Instinct

== Soundtracks ==
Year	Title	Format	Label
2007	Steak: Music from the Motion Picture (with Sebastien Tellier and Mr. Oizo)	CD	Ed Banger, Because Music
2008	Notre Jour Viendra (Our Day will Come)	MP3, CD	Ed Banger, Because Music
2023	Tropic (Original Motion Picture Soundtrack)	MP3, Vinyl	Ed Banger, Because Music

== Other tracks ==
Year	Appearing on	Title	Format	Label
2006	Ed Rec Vol. 1	"Dolami", "H.A.L."	MP3, 12", CD	Ed Banger Records
2007	Ed Rec Vol. 2	"Greel"	MP3, 12", CD	Ed Banger Records
2008	Ed Rec Vol. 3	"Dog"	MP3, 12", CD	Ed Banger Records
2010	Ed Banger Xmas / 2010	"Threnody"	Promo CD	Ed Banger Records
2011	Let the Children Techno	"Enio"	MP3, CD	Ed Banger Records
2011	The Bee Sides	"Total"	7"	Ed Banger Records
2013	Ed Rec Vol. X	"Moi (Demo Version)"	MP3, 12", CD	Ed Banger Records
2017	Ed Rec 100	"So Huge"	MP3, 12", CD	Ed Banger Records

== Production credits ==
=== Albums ===
Album	Year	Artist	Occupation(s)
OutRun	2013	Kavinsky	Co-composer (except "Prelude", "Suburbia", "Testarossa Autodrive", "Nightcall", "Deadcruiser" and "Endless"), producer (except "Testarossa Autodrive", "Nightcall", "Deadcruiser" and "Endless"), mixer
Magnum	2014	Katerine	Composer, producer, mixer
Rest	2017	Charlotte Gainsbourg	Composer and producer (except "Rest") "Songbird in a Cage": producer only
Take 2	2018	Charlotte Gainsbourg	Composer and producer (except "Runaway (Live)")

=== Tracks ===
Title	Year	Artist	Album	Role(s)
"Seule La Musique"	2000	Costes	Nik ta race	Composer, producer
"Difficult"	2010	Uffie	Sex Dreams and Denim Jeans	Composer, producer
"Stabat Mater"	2013	Woodkid	The Golden Age	Composer, producer, arranger
"Rainbow Man 2.0"	2014	Busy P	Reworking Is Not a Crime	"Extra flavas"
"American Beauty/American Psycho"	2014	Fall Out Boy	American Beauty/American Psycho	Composer, producer
"Slide on Me"	2016	Frank Ocean	Endless	Additional programming, synthesizers
"Rushes"	2016	Frank Ocean	Endless	Programming, synthesizers
"Higgs"	2016	Frank Ocean	Endless	Programming, synthesizers
"Facebook Story"	2016	Frank Ocean	Blonde	Composer, vocals
"White Ferrari"	2016	Frank Ocean	Blonde	Drum programming, sample programming
"Godspeed"	2016	Frank Ocean	Blonde	Arrangement, string arrangement
"Rare Changes"	2020	Mayer Hawthorne	Rare Changes	Composer, producer
"Chasing the Feeling"	2020	Mayer Hawthorne	Rare Changes	Composer, producer
"The Mission"	2021	Bakar	Nobody's Home	Composer, producer, drums, synthesizer
"Le dernier jour du disco"	2021	Juliette Armanet	Brûler le feu	Producer, string arranger, strings, bass, drum, programming
"Qu'importe"	2021	Juliette Armanet	Brûler le feu	Composer, producer, string arranger, guitar, keyboards, strings, bass, drum
"Je ne pense qu'à ça"	2021	Juliette Armanet	Brûler le feu	Producer, string arranger, drums, strings, bass
"Vertigo" (featuring SebastiAn)	2021	Juliette Armanet	Brûler le feu	Featured artist, composer, producer, string arranger, piano
"Sauver ma vie"	2021	Juliette Armanet	Brûler le feu	Producer, keyboards, bass
"Zenith" (featuring Prudence and Morgan Phalen)	2022	Kavinsky	Reborn	Composer
"Vigilante" (featuring Morgan Phalen)	2022	Kavinsky	Reborn	Composer
"Fuguer"	2022	Juliette Armanet	Brûler le feu 2	Producer, bass, drum
"À quoi tu joues?"	2022	Juliette Armanet	Brûler le feu 2	Producer, percussion, bass, drum
"Dancing By Night" (featuring SebastiAn)	2023	London Grammar	The Remixes	Featured artist, composer
"Don't Wanna Cry"	2025	Selena Gomez & Benny Blanco	I Said I Love You First	Composer, producer, guitar, keyboards, programming
"Blurry Moon"	2025	Charlotte Gainsbourg	Non-album singles	Composer, producer
"Once"	2025	Kid Cudi	Non-album singles	Producer, composer
"Refresh"	2025	Sébastien Tellier	Kiss The Beast	Producer, keyboards
"Thrill of the Night" (with Slayyyter and Nile Rodgers)	2025	Sébastien Tellier	Kiss The Beast	Producer, keyboards
"Copycat"	2026	Sébastien Tellier	Kiss The Beast	Producer, bass guitar
"Amnesia" (with Kid Cudi)	2026	Sébastien Tellier	Kiss The Beast	Producer, arranger
"Love & Tears" (with Yannis)	2026	GENER8ION	Love & Tears	Composer
"Say it Ain't So"	2026	Penny	Non-album single	Producer
"Love Triangle" (with Caroline Polachek)	2026	Angèle	Instinct	Featured artist, producer

== Remixes ==
Track	Year	Artist(s)	Title (Note: Unless otherwise noted, remixes are listed in the standard format: "SebastiAn Remix".)
"Happy Without You"	2005	Annie	Sebastien Remix (5:11, single); SebastiAn Remix (Same length as single, on Remixes); SebastiAn Remix (4:31, on Productions & Remixes)
"Texas"	2005	Benjamin Theves	
"Human After All"	2005	Daft Punk	
"K-Hole"	2006	Ali Love	"(Remixed By SebastiAn)" (2:35) "(Inst) (Remixed By SebastiAn)" (2:25)
"Going Nowhere"	2006	Cut Copy	
"Camera"	2006	Editors	"SebastiAn Remix" (5:05, on Remixed EP) "Fader - SebastiAn Remix" (3:14, on Remixes)
"If You Fail We All Fail"	2006	Fields	
"Testarossa Autodrive"	2006	Kavinsky	(5:00, on 1986 EP; 3:29, on Remixes)
"Bossy"	2006	Kelis	
"Paris Four Hundred"	2006	Mylo	(3:55, single; 4:24, on Remixes)
"Tous ces mots"	2006	Nâdiya	
"La La Land"	2006	Play Paul	Ed Banger's All Stars Remix (Xavier de Rosnay and SebastiAn)
"Walking Machine"	2006	Revl9n	(4:04, single; 3:29, on Remixes)
"Get Myself Into It"	2006	The Rapture	"Sebastian Mix" (3:16, single) "SebastiAn Remix" (2:57, on Remixes)
"Pop the Glock"	2006	Uffie	Sebastian Remix 1 (3:24, on Arcade Mode); Sebastian Remix 2 (2:42, on Ed Banger Records)
"I Still Remember"	2007	Bloc Party	"Sebastian Mix" (4:29, single) "SebastiAn Remix" (3:51, on Remixes)
"Fool for Love"	2007	Das Pop	
"Ride the Pony"	2007	Fuckpony	SebastiAn Tellier Remix (SebastiAn and Sébastien Tellier Remix)
"Golden Skans"	2007	Klaxons	(4:22, single; 5:02, EP; 4:31, Remixes)
"Killing in the Name"	2007	Rage Against the Machine	Sebastian's Late Night Laptop Edit; Sebastian – "Killing in the Name of Sebastian"
"Both Gotta Move On"	2007	Scenario Rock	
"Sexual Sportswear"	2007	Sébastien Tellier	
"Debbie's Shoes"	2007	Shesus	Sebastien Mix
"We Danced Together"	2007	The Rakes	
"Cheap and Cheerful"	2008	The Kills	
"Difficult"	2010	Uffie	2006 Parties Remix by SebastiAn
"Don't Play No Game That I Can't Win"	2011	Beastie Boys featuring Santigold	
"Watch Me Dance"	2011	Toddla T and Roots Manuva	
"New Lands"	2012	Justice	
"Must Be the Feeling"	2012	Nero	
"DTF DADT"	2012	Spank Rock	
"Time to Dance"	2012	The Shoes	
"Idea of Happiness"	2012	Van She	
"Run Boy Run"	2012	Woodkid	
"Hey Joe"	2014	Charlotte Gainsbourg	
"Bonnie and Clyde"	2017	Brigitte Bardot & Serge Gainsbourg	AKSE Remix
"Ring-a-Ring o' Roses"	2018	Charlotte Gainsbourg	SebastiAn "On the Beat" Remix
"Après le Blitz"	2018	Étienne Daho featuring Flavien Berger	
"Mountain at My Gates"	2020	Foals	
"Your Devotion"	2020	Y.O.G.A.	
"Limbo"	2021	Royal Blood	
"Don't Tread on Else Matters" ("Don't Tread on Me" and "Nothing Else Matters")	2021	Metallica	

Unreleased remixes

- 2008: The Who – "Baba O' Riley"
- 2009: Amon Düül II – "Spaniards & Spacemen"
- 2010: Depeche Mode – "Master and Servant"
- 2016: Earth, Wind & Fire – "Shining Star"
