= The Rakes discography =

- Studio albums: 3
- Extended plays: 1
- Singles: 9

The Rakes were an indie rock band based in London, England. At the time of the band splitting in October 2009, the band line-up consisted of Alan Donohoe (lead vocals and rhythm guitar), Matthew Swinnerton (lead guitar), Jamie Hornsmith (bass) and Lasse Petersen (drums). The Rakes' discography consisted of three studio albums, one EP and nine singles.

The Rakes released their debut studio album, Capture/Release, in the UK in August 2005 on V2 Records. The record was generally well received by critics, and achieved a peak position of #32 on the UK Albums Chart. A total of six singles were released from the album, with the most successful being the bonus track on the reissue of the album, "All Too Human", which peaked at #22 in the UK Singles Chart in March 2006. In October 2005, the band released an EP in the United States, which featured six different tracks including three songs from the album, two previously unreleased tracks and a remix of the song "Retreat".

On 19 March 2007, The Rakes released their second album, Ten New Messages, which achieved a peak position of #38 in the UK Albums Chart, and was preceded by the first single from the record, "The World Was a Mess But His Hair Was Perfect". The album was the band's most successful in France, achieving a peak position of #77 in the SNEP chart. The group released their third studio album, Klang on 23 March 2009. The record was their least successful commercially, failing to chart in the UK, and peaking at #91 in France. Before the band split, only one single was released from the album; "1989" was released one week before the album but failed to chart in the UK.

== Studio albums ==
Year	Details	Peak chart positions		
Year	Details	UK	FRA	SCO
2005	Capture/Release: Released: 15 August 2005; Label: V2 (VVR1032762); Formats: CD, LP, Download	32	122	—
2007	Ten New Messages: Released: 19 March 2007; Label: V2 (VVR1041852); Formats: LP, CD, Download	38	77	53
2009	Klang: Released: 23 March 2009; Label: V2 (VVR701574); Formats: LP, CD, download	109	91	—
"—" denotes releases that did not chart.

== Extended plays ==
Year	Details
2005	Retreat EP: Released: 11 October 2005; Label: Dim Mak (DM 092); Format: CD

== Singles ==
List of singles, with selected chart positions
Title	Year	Peak chart positions			Album
Title	Year	UK	UK Indie	SCO	Album
"22 Grand Job"	2004	—	—	—	Capture/Release
"Strasbourg"	2004	57	11	83	Capture/Release
"Retreat"	2005	24	1	24	Capture/Release
"Work, Work, Work (Pub, Club, Sleep)"	2005	28	1	—	Capture/Release
"22 Grand Job" (reissue)	2005	39	5	40	Capture/Release
"All Too Human"	2006	22	1	20	Capture/Release
"We Danced Together"	2007	38	—	28	Ten New Messages
"The World Was a Mess But His Hair Was Perfect"	2007	—	—	—	Ten New Messages
"1989"	2009	—	—	—	Klang
"That's the Reason"	2009	—	—	—	Klang
"—" denotes releases that did not chart.

== Compilation and soundtrack appearances ==
The Rakes have had a number of songs featured on compilation albums. The songs "Strasbourg", "22 Grand Job" and "Binary Love" have all appeared on New Musical Express albums. "22 Grand Job" and "Retreat" have featured on V2 compilations. The track "The World Was a Mess But His Hair Was Perfect" appeared on the 2007 CD, The State of Independence. The video game FIFA 06 featured a censored version of the song "Strasbourg". " the censored version of retreat " is in fifa manager 06 .
