= Typhoons (album) =

Studio album by Royal Blood
- Released: 30 April 2021
- Recorded: February 2019 – August 2020 in Brighton
- Genres: Dance-rock; alternative rock; hard rock
- Length: 38:11
- Label: Warner
- Producers: Royal Blood (Note: Tracks 1–3, 5–7, 10, and 11); Josh Homme (Note: Tracks 8, 12, and 13); Paul Epworth (Note: Tracks 1 and 4)

Royal Blood chronology
How Did We Get So Dark? (2017)	Typhoons (2021)	Back to the Water Below (2023)

Singles from Typhoons
- 1. "Trouble's Coming" Released: 24 September 2020; 2. "Typhoons" Released: 21 January 2021; 3. "Limbo" Released: 25 March 2021

Typhoons is the third studio album by English rock duo Royal Blood, released through Warner Records on 30 April 2021. A predominantly self-produced effort, the band recorded the album throughout 2019 and 2020. The album also marks a notable shift in the band's sound, pairing their usual alternative and hard rock sound with elements of dance-rock and disco. The album was preceded by three singles—"Trouble's Coming", "Typhoons", and "Limbo"—in addition to the promotional single "Boilermaker".

Typhoons received generally favourable reviews from critics, some of whom deemed it the band's best work to date, and was a commercial success, becoming the band's third consecutive UK number one album.

== Recording ==
Royal Blood began recording the album in early 2019. Halfway through the year, they embarked on a tour consisting of intimate shows as well as appearances at festivals such as the Reading and Leeds Festivals. During this tour the band debuted the songs "Boilermaker" and "King" live. They resumed recording later that year. During this time, the duo were recovering from having toured alongside Queens of the Stone Age during the Villains World Tour and promotion of How Did We Get So Dark?, with Kerr affected particularly hard by the constant partying of the tour and thus focused his efforts on becoming sober. As such, this process of sobering up also saw Kerr gain new "clarity and focus on being creative", and his thoughts surrounding this were influential on the songwriting process. The band struggled at first to find their footing with the album, though drummer Ben Thatcher identified the first single "Trouble's Coming" as the first track to click with the band. "Trouble's Coming" saw the foundation for the infusion of the disco influences that were followed up in later tracks.

Recording of the album stretched into early 2020, when it was forced to be halted as a result of the COVID-19 pandemic in England. Although the songwriting was mostly done, the band wrote additional songs in lockdowns - "Typhoons", "Limbo", "Mad Visions" and "Oblivion", two of which lead singer Mike Kerr felt were "the two best songs on the record". "King" was ultimately cut from the main release of the album as the band didn't feel it worked on the record, as it was too reminiscent of the band's previous sound, alongside another track "Space". "Space" was recorded with Kerr playing guitar as opposed to his usual bass, following on from his guitar-led contributions to Desert Sessions Vols. 11 & 12 in 2019. Both tracks however would be included on the digital deluxe version of the album. Other tunings and instrumental setups for the bass were explored during the production, with elements such as playing bass with guitar strings and different tunings used to help add additional variety to the sound.

== Promotion ==
On 24 September 2020, the band released "Trouble's Coming", the lead single from the album. The video for the single was premiered on 23 October 2020, and in the same month it was included as a part of the soundtracks for the EA Sports video games NHL 21 and FIFA 21. The song went on to be a commercial success, reaching No. 8 in Scotland and No. 46 in the United Kingdom. On 21 January 2021, the band revealed the title of the album as Typhoons, as well as announcing its track list and release date of 30 April 2021. Additionally, they released the album's title track as a single on the same day. A music video for the song was released on 28 January. It reached No. 63 in the UK as well as No. 2 in the country's Rock & Metal singles chart. The single was also used by Codemasters and EA Sports in the trailer for the video game F1 2021. On 25 March, the band released "Limbo" as the third single from Typhoons. On 13 April, "Boilermaker" was released with an accompanying music video directed by and starring Liam Lynch.

== Critical reception ==
Professional ratings
Aggregate scores
Source	Rating
Metacritic	77/100
Review scores
Source	Rating
AllMusic	4/5 stars
Clash	7/10
Classic Rock	4/5 stars
DIY	3/5 stars
The Independent	4/5 stars
Kerrang!	4/5 stars
The Line of Best Fit	8/10
Mojo	4/5 stars
NME	4/5 stars
Uncut	6/10

In a four star review for NME, Typhoons was praised as Royal Blood's "best work to date" and describes the track 'Boilermaker' as the "album's true centrepiece". Gigwise held the album in similar acclaim, stating that Typhoons forges "the sound of modern masters honing their craft to reinvigorate the [rock] genre". The Independent praised the band for reinventing their sound, making comparisons with Daft Punk-esque electronic flairs, and assesses that "the riffs are better, arrangements more textured, harmonies more interesting". In a less positive review, DIY says that the "songs here may be more melodic, more complex even on paper, but in reality there's little there to truly grab hold of".

It was elected by Loudwire as the 43rd best rock/metal album of 2021.

== Usage in media ==
- The title track, "Typhoons", is included on the soundtrack for the video game, WWE 2K22, and featured as the backing song in trailers for the video game, F1 2021.
- The track, "Trouble's Coming", is included on the soundtracks for the video games, Forza Horizon 5, FIFA 21, NHL 21, and The Crew Motorfest. The song was also featured on the TV series, The Good Doctor, where it appeared in the season six, episode nine, "Broken or Not".
- The track, "Oblivion", is included in the soundtrack for the video game, MLB The Show 21.
- The song, "Trouble's Coming", is also used in the BBC series, Gladiators as Viper's song.

== Track listing ==
All lyrics are written by Mike Kerr; all music is composed by Royal Blood, except where noted.

No.	Title	Lyrics	Music	Length
1.	"Trouble's Coming"			3:48
2.	"Oblivion"			2:41
3.	"Typhoons"			3:56
4.	"Who Needs Friends"	Mike Kerr; Joe Keogh		3:10
5.	"Million and One"			4:18
6.	"Limbo"			4:53
7.	"Either You Want It"			3:00
8.	"Boilermaker"		Royal Blood; Tom Hill	3:29
9.	"Mad Visions"			3:09
10.	"Hold On"			3:14
11.	"All We Have Is Now"		Mike Kerr	2:33
Total length:				38:11

Japanese edition bonus track
No.	Title	Length
12.	"Space"	4:04
Total length:		42:22

Deluxe digital edition
No.	Title	Length
12.	"Space"	4:04
13.	"King"	3:24
Total length:		45:39

== Personnel ==
Credits adapted from the Typhoons liner notes.

Royal Blood

- Mike Kerr – bass, keyboards, vocals, backing vocals, clavinet, therevox
- Ben Thatcher – drums, percussion

Additional musicians

- Bobbie Gordon – backing vocals (1, 2, 4, 9)
- Jodie Scantlebury – backing vocals (2, 4, 9)

Technical

- Royal Blood – production (1–3, 5–7, 9–11)
- Paul Epworth – additional production (1), production (4)
- Riley Macintyre – engineering (1, 4, 11), vocal production (5), mixing (11)
- Pete Hutchings – engineering (1, 2, 9), mixing (2, 9, 12–13)
- Matt Wiggins – additional engineering (1), engineering (3, 5–7, 10)
- Claude Vause – engineering assistance (1, 7, 10)
- Marcus Locock – engineering assistance (1, 3, 6–7, 10)
- Matty Green – mixing (1, 3–8, 10)
- Luke Pickering – engineering assistance (4, 5, 11)
- Josh Homme – production (8, 12–13)
- Mark Rankin – engineering (8, 12–13)
- Justin Smith – engineering assistance (8, 12–13)
- Joe LaPorta – mastering

== Charts ==
=== Weekly charts ===
Weekly chart performance for Typhoons
Chart (2021)	Peak position
Australian Albums (ARIA)	5
Austrian Albums (Ö3 Austria)	17
Belgian Albums (Ultratop Flanders)	4
Belgian Albums (Ultratop Wallonia)	3
Canadian Albums (Billboard)	35
Czech Albums (ČNS IFPI)	79
Dutch Albums (Album Top 100)	5
Finnish Albums (Suomen virallinen lista)	29
French Albums (SNEP)	30
German Albums (Offizielle Top 100)	20
Hungarian Albums (MAHASZ)	8
Irish Albums (Official Charts)	1
Italian Albums (FIMI)	44
New Zealand Albums (RMNZ)	6
Polish Albums (ZPAV)	12
Portuguese Albums (AFP)	13
Scottish Albums (Official Charts)	1
Spanish Albums (Promusicae)	56
Swiss Albums (Schweizer Hitparade)	9
UK Albums (Official Charts)	1
US Billboard 200	48
US Top Alternative Albums (Billboard)	4
US Top Hard Rock Albums (Billboard)	3
US Top Rock Albums (Billboard)	7

=== Year-end charts ===
Year-end chart performance for Typhoons
Chart (2021)	Position
UK Albums (OCC)	81

== Certifications ==
Region	Certification	Certified units/sales
United Kingdom (BPI)	Gold	100,000^{‡}
^{‡} Sales+streaming figures based on certification alone.
