= Remixes (Sebastian album) =

Remix album by SebastiAn
- Released: September 22, 2008
- Genre: Electro house
- Length: 65:15
- Label: Because Music, Ed Banger
- Producer: SebastiAn

SebastiAn chronology
Ross Ross Ross (2006)	Remixes (2008)	Total (2011)

Alternative cover
- Album cover without the red sleeve.

Remixes (digital version released as A Fine Selection of Remixes) is a compilation of remixes by French electronic producer SebastiAn. Featuring remixes made from 2005 to 2008, it was released on September 22, 2008 as a CD, a vinyl record, and digital download.

== Cover art ==
As for any cover art on releases by Ed Banger Records, the design is coordinated by graphic designer So Me.

The CD version is edited in gatefold format, inserted in a red translucent plastic sleeve. The image depicts the drawing of the features of the artist's face in black. When the red sleeve is removed, it then reveals the real papercard cover, which, in addition to the face, features several drawings and commentaries about the album, written in red (and therefore not visible through the sleeve). Some of them include : "Do you think you can handle this?", "Is it a best of ? Well, yes somehow it's true", "Dancefloor fillers... also surprising pop reworks".

== Track listing ==
No.	Title	Writer(s)	Artist	Length
1.	"Intro"	Sebastian Akchoté	SebastiAn	0:51
2.	"Walking Machine (Note: This track is erroneously referred to in digital releases of the album as "Someone Like You", the title of the third track from Revl9n's self-titled debut album.)"	Asa Cerderqvist / Maria Eilersen / Nandor Hegedüs	Revl9n	3:29
3.	"Human After All"	Thomas Bangalter / Guy Manuel De Homem-Christo	Daft Punk	4:44
4.	"Paris Four Hundred"	Myles MacInnes	Mylo	4:25
5.	"Get Myself Into It"	Gabriel Andruzzi / Luke Jenner / Vito Roccoforte / Matt Safer	The Rapture	2:57
6.	"Camera"	Edward Lay / Russell Leetch / Tom Smith / Chris Urbanowicz	Editors	3:14
7.	"We Danced Together"	Alan Donohoe / Jamie Hornsmith / Lasse Petersen / Matthew Swinnerton	The Rakes	3:09
8.	"Bossy"	Shondrae Crawford / Sean Garrett / Kelis Rogers-Jones / Todd Shaw	Kelis	3:18
9.	"Cheap and Cheerful"	Jamie Hince / Alison Mosshart	The Kills	5:52
10.	"Testarossa Autodrive"	Vincent Belorgey	Kavinsky	3:29
11.	"Texas"	Benjamin Theves	Benjamin Theves	5:21
12.	"Fool for Love"	Niek Meul / Lieven Moors / Reinhard Vanbergen / Bent Van Looy	Das Pop	4:53
13.	"I Still Remember"	Russell Lissack / Gordon Moakes / Kele Okereke / Matt Tong	Bloc Party	3:51
14.	"Sexual Sportswear"	Guy Manuel De Homem-Christo / Sébastien Tellier	Sébastien Tellier	3:39
15.	"Golden Skans"	Jamie Reynolds / James Righton / Simon Taylor-Davis	Klaxons	4:31
16.	"Happy Without You"	Timo Kaukolampi / Anne Strand	Annie	5:11
17.	"Tous ces mots"	Géraldine Delacoux / Thierry Gronfier	Nâdiya	2:28
