= AC Monza Team eSports =

Esports department of football club AC Monza

- Full name: AC Monza Team eSports
- Short name: Monza
- Games: FIFA
- Founded: 13 September 2019; 6 years ago
- Manager: Alessandro Brandi
- Parent group: AC Monza
- Website: acmonza.com/en/esports

AC Monza Team eSports, or simply Monza (Italian pronunciation: [ˈmontsa]), is the esports department of Italian football club Monza. The division was established in September 2019 as a FIFA team.

== History ==
Monza formed their esports team in September 2019, to compete in competitive FIFA games on PlayStation consoles. Simone Figura (Figu7rinho) and Raffaele Cacciapuoti (Er_Caccia98) were presented as the team's first pro players. In May 2020, Er_Caccia98 won the European tournament of the 32nd edition of Futhead's Tuesday Night Football.

Figura left in November 2020, and made way for Renzo Parave (Nzorello). Monza reached the 2021 FIFA eClub World Cup Europe semi-finals, and were ranked 12th in the overall rankings; they were the third-best professional football club in Europe, and fourth worldwide. In the 2021 eChampions League, Er_Caccia98 reached the final, losing to Danish player OliverPN; he won $50,000 for finishing second.

In January 2022, the Osservatorio Italiano Esports (OIES) presented their "OIES Badge" to a select few esports teams; Monza and Inter Milan were the only two football clubs to receive the certification.

In October 2022, Cacciapuoti was confirmed in the roster for the fourth consecutive year, while Parave was replaced by Lucio Vecchione (HHezerS). During the 2022–23 season, Monza made their debut in the eSerie A, finishing third, and won the Italian eSupercup. Monza finished runners-up in the eChampions League a second time in 2023, with HHezerS losing to EmreYilmaz in the final.

== Roster ==
=== Current ===
AC Monza Team eSports FIFA roster
Players
Coaches

Handle	Name	Nationality
Er_Caccia98	Cacciapuoti, Raffaele	Italy
HHezerS	Vecchione, Lucio	Italy

Head coach

- Vacant

Legend:
- (I) Inactive
- (S) Suspended
- Substitute
- (injured) Injury / Illness

Latest roster transaction: 25 October 2022.

=== Former ===
Handle	Name	Nationality	Period	Console
Figu7rinho	Simone Figura	Italy	13 September 2019 – 6 November 2020	PlayStation
Nzorello	Renzo Parave	Italy	6 November 2020 – 25 October 2022	PlayStation

== Achievements ==
Competition	Ranking	Player(s)	Season
FIFAe Club World Cup – Europe	3–4th of 14	Er_Caccia98, Nzorello	2021 (FIFA 21)
eChampions League	2nd of 32	Er_Caccia98	2021 (FIFA 21)
eChampions League	2nd of 32	HHezerS	2023 (FIFA 23)
eSerie A	3rd of 14	Er_Caccia98, HHezerS	2022–23 (FIFA 23)
eSupercup	1st of 14	Er_Caccia98, HHezerS	2023 (FIFA 23)
