= Notre Jour Viendra OST =

Soundtrack album by SebastiAn
- Released: 2010
- Genre: Electronic, Avant-garde
- Length: 20:11
- Label: Ed Banger Records

SebastiAn chronology
Remixes (SebastiAn album) (2008)	Notre Jour Viendra OST (2010)	Total (2011)

Notre Jour Viendra OST is a 2010 album by the French artist SebastiAn. It is the soundtrack to the film of the same name directed by Romain Gavras.

== Track listing ==
No.	Title	Length
1.	"Intro"	0:33
2.	"Ouverture"	0:49
3.	"Rode - Prelude"	1:24
4.	"Axis - Prelude"	1:22
5.	"Fauve - Prelude"	1:48
6.	"Dies Irae"	2:24
7.	"Retro"	1:41
8.	"Ad Gloriam"	1:35
9.	"Fauve - Epilogue"	1:26
10.	"Axis - Epilogue"	0:49
11.	"L'enfance d'un chien" (Sébastien Tellier)	3:00
12.	"Rode - Epilogue"	1:42
13.	"Crescendo"	1:38
