= Trouble's Coming =

Single by Royal Blood

from the album Typhoons
- Released: 24 September 2020
- Recorded: 2020
- Genre: Dance-rock; hard rock; alternative rock
- Length: 3:48
- Label: Warner
- Composers: Mike Kerr; Ben Thatcher
- Lyricist: Mike Kerr
- Producers: Royal Blood; Paul Epworth

Royal Blood singles chronology
"Look Like You Know" (2018)	"Trouble's Coming" (2020)	"Typhoons" (2021)

Music video
- "Trouble's Coming" on YouTube

"Trouble's Coming" is a song by English rock band Royal Blood, the opening track on their third studio album, Typhoons (2021). It was released as the album's lead single on 24 September 2020. It reached No. 8 in Scotland and No. 46 in the United Kingdom. On Billboard genre-specific charts, it reached No. 1 on the Canada Rock chart and No. 29 on the US Hot Rock & Alternative Songs chart.

== Background and composition ==
English rock duo Royal Blood released their second studio album, How Did We Get So Dark?, on 16 June 2017. While touring to support this album, vocalist and bassist Mike Kerr struggled with alcoholism and drug addiction, and he decided to become sober in early 2019. That July, Kerr told NME that Royal Blood was in the process of recording a new album, but that they were "not in a rush to put out something that's mediocre". In the process of writing new music, Kerr and drummer Ben Thatcher wanted to create a new sound, and they began to incorporate dance music elements into their songs.

== Release and promotion ==
Royal Blood first teased their upcoming release on 17 September 2020, when the band posted a photo of a vintage, orange-colored Ford car to their Twitter and Instagram accounts. The vehicle's license plate read "ROYAL", while the post was captioned "24.09". On 21 September, the band posted a snippet of "Trouble's Coming" on Instagram and announced that the full track would be released three days later.

The song was later used in the soundtracks for Dirt 5, FIFA 21, NHL 21, Forza Horizon 5, The Crew Motorfest and NASCAR 21: Ignition. The song was used in the second episode of the second season of the Netflix series Locke & Key and in the ninth episode of the sixth season of The Good Doctor, along with the fifth episode of the first season of The Company You Keep.

Since 2024 this has been used on Gladiators as the entrance theme for Viper

On 19 November 2020, the band performed the song on The Late Late Show with James Corden.

== Critical reception ==
Alex Mace of Platform Magazine reviewed the song positively, giving it an 8.5/10 rating. Mace described the song as a "big, glossy dance jam", and that the song was "[p]roof that Royal Blood can indeed do something different and do it well". Jon Blistein of Rolling Stone and Ben Kaye of Consequence of Sound both noted the dance influences in Trouble's Coming, with Blistein describing the song as the band injecting "a bit of dancefloor energy into their hard rock sound", and Kaye describing the song as a "dance floor stomper".

== Music video ==
The music video for "Trouble's Coming" was premiered on 23 October 2020 and was directed by Dir. Lx.

== Track listing ==
7"; digital download
No.	Title	Length
1.	"Trouble's Coming"	3:48

Digital download – remix
No.	Title	Length
1.	"Trouble's Coming" (Purple Disco Machine remix)	4:25

== Charts ==
=== Weekly charts ===
Weekly chart performance for "Trouble's Coming"
Chart (2020–2021)	Peak position
Belgium (Ultratip Bubbling Under Flanders)	14
Belgium (Ultratip Bubbling Under Wallonia)	47
Canada All-Format Airplay (Billboard)	45
Canada Rock (Billboard)	1
Scotland Singles (OCC)	8
Switzerland Airplay (Schweizer Hitparade)	99
UK Singles (OCC)	46
US Hot Rock & Alternative Songs (Billboard)	28
US Rock & Alternative Airplay (Billboard)	2

=== Year-end charts ===
Year-end chart performance for "Trouble's Coming"
Chart (2021)	Position
US Hot Rock & Alternative Songs (Billboard)	86
US Rock Airplay (Billboard)	15
