= Thirst (Sebastian album) =

Studio album by Sebastian
- Released: 8 November 2019
- Genre: House; electronic; R&B; rock; hip-hop; synth-pop; classical
- Length: 66:22
- Label: Ed Banger; Because

Sebastian chronology
Total (2011)	Thirst (2019)

Singles from Thirst
- 1. "Thirst" Released: 9 May 2019; 2. "Run for Me" Released: 14 May 2019; 3. "Beograd" Released: 9 July 2019; 4. "Better Now" Released: 5 September 2019; 5. "Sober" Released: 8 October 2019

Thirst is the second studio album by French electronic artist Sebastian, released on 8 November 2019 by Ed Banger Records. The album includes features from Charlotte Gainsbourg, Gallant, Mayer Hawthorne, and Bakar, among others.

== Background and release ==
In May 2019, Sebastian released two new singles, "Thirst" and "Run for Me", with the latter being a collaboration with American singer Gallant, to promote the album. On 9 July 2019, Sebastian released the album's third single, "Beograd". The fourth single, "Better Now", a collaboration with American singer Mayer Hawthorne, was released on 5 September 2019. The fifth and final single, "Sober", a collaboration with British singer Bakar, was released on 8 October 2019, before the album was released on 8 November 2019.

Like the cover art for Sebastian's debut album Total, Jean-Baptiste Mondino photographed the cover art for Thirst; unlike Total, in which the cover art depicts Sebastian kissing himself, the cover art for Thirst depicts Sebastian punching himself in the middle of a desert. Sebastian describes the meaning of the cover as "the consequences of loving yourself too much". Sebastian says, "[The title] could be Thirst because I drink a lot, but it could also be the thirst you feel for having one million people following you on Instagram. I love when words mean many things at the same time. With the cover, they are fighting and we don’t know why. It was a feeling of the moment, of what [is happening] now."

== Reception ==
Professional ratings
Aggregate scores
Source	Rating
Metacritic	81/100
Review scores
Source	Rating
AllMusic	link
Mojo	4/5 stars
musicOMH	link
Q	6/10 link
The Independent	link

Thirst received positive reviews from music critics. At Metacritic, the album received an average score of 81, based on 5 reviews, indicating "universal acclaim". AllMusic writer Heather Phares gave a positive review to the album, rating it 3.5 out of 5 stars and wrote, "While Thirst's generous length means it meanders occasionally, it gives SebastiAn plenty of room to show how much he's grown since the early 2010s. Even if his music has slowed down, it's not standing still." Mojo gave it a more positive review, rating it 4 out of 5 stars and said, "It's a good album, but the standout track is just him alone on Beograd, a swirling big-room French house track, where he is beautifully lost in the beats." Ben Devlin of musicOMH also gave the album 4 out of 5 stars and said, "The record feels as if a lot of time has been spent on it – getting the sound just right, making sure the collaborations work – and the result is a triumph from a producer whose sound has lost none of its flair." Q Magazine gave it a more mixed review, rating it 6 out of 10, saying Sebastian "can still serve up a dancefloor banger when required" and wrote, "Although it's on the album's closing track that he discovers the perfect balance between artistry and energy, silken-voiced R&B singer Gallant turning Run For Me into a heady EDM ballad that elevates his signature beats to new heights." The Independent rated the album 4 out of 5 stars, calling it "one of the most considered and thought-provoking electronic albums of the year."

== Track listing ==
No.	Title	Length
1.	"Thirst"	2:19
2.	"Doorman" (featuring Syd)	3:49
3.	"Movement" (featuring Lola Delon)	4:27
4.	"Better Now" (featuring Mayer Hawthorne)	5:41
5.	"Pleasant" (featuring Charlotte Gainsbourg)	3:10
6.	"Yebo" (featuring Allan Kingdom)	3:53
7.	"Sev" (featuring Sevdaliza)	1:58
8.	"スィート Sweet" (featuring Loota)	2:57
9.	"Sober" (featuring Bakar)	3:21
10.	"Time to Talk" (featuring Sunni Colón)	2:37
11.	"Beograd"	5:43
12.	"Handcuffed to a Parking Meter" (featuring Sparks)	4:29
13.	"Devoyka"	3:44
14.	"Run for Me" (featuring Gallant)	6:15
15.	"Better Now (Edit)" (featuring Mayer Hawthorne)	4:32
16.	"Beograd (Edit)"	3:37
17.	"Run for Me (Edit)" (featuring Gallant)	3:50
Total length:		66:22

== Charts ==
Chart (2019)	Peak position
French Albums (SNEP)	90
