= Strasbourg (song) =

Single by the Rakes

from the album Capture/Release
- Released: 27 September 2004
- Recorded: 2004
- Genre: Indie rock
- Length: 2:30
- Label: Mercury Records
- Songwriter(s): Alan Donohoe, Jamie Horn-Smith, Lasse Petersen, Matthew Swinnerton

The Rakes singles chronology
| "22 Grand Job" (2005) | "Strasbourg" (2004) | "Retreat" (2005) |

"Strasbourg" is a song by English indie rock band the Rakes, from their 2005 debut album, Capture/Release. Released on 27 September 2004, it was the second single taken from the album. It charted on the UK Singles Chart at No. 57. The song was featured in the video game FIFA 06.

== Track listing ==
7" vinyl (B00030NU8G)

1. "Strasbourg" (2:30)
2. "Just Got Paid" (1:49)
3. "retreat" (2:58)
4. "T Bone" (3:36)
