= Typhoons (song) =

Single by Royal Blood

from the album Typhoons
- Released: 21 January 2021
- Recorded: 2020
- Genre: Dance-rock; alternative rock
- Length: 3:57
- Label: Warner
- Composers: Mike Kerr; Ben Thatcher
- Lyricist: Mike Kerr
- Producer: Royal Blood

Royal Blood singles chronology
"Trouble's Coming" (2020)	"Typhoons" (2021)	"Limbo" (2021)

"Typhoons" is a song by English rock band Royal Blood, and was released on 21 January 2021 as the second single from their third studio album of the same name. The song reached number 63 on the UK Singles Chart.

== Composition ==
"Typhoons" is a song about being lost in one's own thoughts. In an interview with NME, Mike Kerr described how he believed "everyone can get lost in their own mind, and they can have dark spells in their own mind," and that he "wanted to write a song that recognised them, but was also uplifting and empowering." Musically, the song has been described as dance-rock and alternative rock.

== Promotion ==
On 15 January 2021, the band released a short preview of "Typhoons" on their Facebook, Instagram, and Twitter pages, before officially releasing the song on 21 January.

The song is featured on the soundtrack of WWE 2K22.

The song also featured as Trailer Video for F1 2021 video game.

== Music video ==
The music video for "Typhoons" was premiered on 28 January 2021 and was directed by Quentin Deronzier.

== Charts ==
Chart performance for "Typhoons"
Chart (2021)	Peak position
Belgium (Ultratip Bubbling Under Flanders)	18
Canada Rock (Billboard)	3
Czech Republic (Modern Rock)	3
Hungary (Single Top 40)	5
New Zealand Hot Singles (RMNZ)	37
UK Singles (Official Charts)	63
UK Rock & Metal (Official Charts)	2
US Rock & Alternative Airplay (Billboard)	22
US Alternative Airplay (Billboard)	20
US Mainstream Rock (Billboard)	9
