= Our Day Will Come (film) =

- French theatrical poster
- French: Notre jour viendra
- Directed by: Romain Gavras
- Written by: Romain Gavras; Karim Boukercha
- Produced by: Vincent Cassel; Éric Névé
- Starring: Vincent Cassel; Olivier Barthélémy
- Cinematography: Andre Chemetoff
- Edited by: Benjamin Weill
- Music by: Sebastian
- Distributed by: UGC
- Release dates: September 12, 2010 (Toronto International Film Festival); September 15, 2010 (France)
- Running time: 90 minutes
- Country: France
- Language: French

Our Day Will Come (French: Notre jour viendra) is a French 2010 drama film co-written and directed by Romain Gavras. It stars Vincent Cassel, who is also one of the producers.

== Plot ==
Rémy is a red-headed teenage outcast living in north-western France. He meets a troubled psychiatrist, Patrick and together they set off on a voyage with no predetermined destination in their newly acquired red Porsche. They decide to go to Ireland on the assumption that redheads are well treated there.

== Cast ==
- Vincent Cassel as Patrick
- Olivier Barthélémy as Rémy
- Justine Lerooy as Natacha
- Vanessa Decat as Vaness
- Boris Gamthety as Serge (as Boris Gamthety 'Byron')
- Rodolphe Blanchet as Joel
- Chloe Catoen as redhead (as a child)
- Sylvain Le Mynez as hostage
- Pierre Boulanger as receptionist
- Julie Vergult as Lea
- Mathilde Braure as Rémy's mother
- Camille Rowe as the English girl #1
- Joséphine de La Baume as the English girl #2
- Alexandra Dahlström as the English girl #3

== Reception ==
On the review aggregate website Rotten Tomatoes, the film has an approval rating of 45%, based on 11 reviews with an average score of 5.79/10. Peter Bradshaw of The Guardian gave it 2/5 and called it "a road movie that runs out of road – and out of ideas."

== See also ==
- Notre Jour Viendra OST
