= Halo (Bakar album) =

Studio album by Bakar
- Released: 22 September 2023
- Genre: Rap; pop; R&B
- Length: 33:59
- Label: Black Butter
- Producer: Beach Noise; Jake the Snake; Zach Nahome

Bakar chronology
Nobody's Home (2022)	Halo (2023)

Singles from Halo
- 1. "Alive!" Released: 30 June 2023; 2. "Right Here, for Now" Released: 17 August 2023

Halo is the second album by British musician Bakar, released on 22 September 2023 through Black Butter Records. It was preceded by the singles "Alive!" and "Right Here, for Now". The album contains a duet version of Bakar's 2019 single "Hell n Back" featuring American singer Summer Walker.

== Critical reception ==
Professional ratings
Aggregate scores
Source	Rating
Metacritic	68/100
Review scores
Source	Rating
Clash	9/10
Dork	4/5 stars
The Line of Best Fit	8/10
The Guardian	4/5 stars

Halo received a score of 68 out of 100 on review aggregator Metacritic based on four critics' reviews, indicating "generally favorable" reception. Dork's Rebecca Kesteven called it "ambient, down-to-earth, and introspective" as well as "a reflective album that radiates a comforting warmth; and Bakar's songwriting talent speaks for itself". Amelie Grice of Clash found that "Bakar has perfected a gorgeous blend of rap, pop, R&B and synth electronics" on the album that she called "mostly upbeat [...] but it paces itself by taking breaks with more reflective tracks". Joshua Mills of The Line of Best Fit described it as "a much more concentrated effort with a keen ear for structure, energy waxing and waning in all the right places" than Nobody's Home (2022).

== Track listing ==
Halo track listing
No.	Title	Length
1.	"OneInOneOut"	3:13
2.	"Alive!"	3:52
3.	"Facts_Situations"	2:42
4.	"All Night"	3:28
5.	"Selling Biscuits"	2:09
6.	"I'm Done"	2:29
7.	"Right Here, for Now"	3:00
8.	"Hate the Sun"	3:34
9.	"Invisible"	2:37
10.	"To Open My Heart"	3:40
11.	"Hell n Back" (featuring Summer Walker)	3:15
Total length:		33:59

== Charts ==
Chart performance for Halo
Chart (2023)	Peak position
Australian Hitseekers Albums (ARIA)	5
Scottish Albums (OCC)	20
UK Albums (OCC)	15
