= Hell n Back =

Single by Bakar

from the EP Will You Be My Yellow?
- Released: 15 August 2019
- Genre: Alternative rock; soul
- Length: 3:33
- Label: Black Butter
- Songwriters: Bakar; Matt Schaefer; Jake Kosich; Johnny Koshit; Andrew Boyd; Isaiah Barr; Lee Diamond
- Producers: Jake the Snake; Beach Noise

Bakar singles chronology
"Chill" (2019)	"Hell n Back" (2019)	"1st Time" (2020)

Music video
- "Hell n Back" on YouTube

"Hell n Back" is a song by British singer Bakar, released as a single from his EP Will You Be My Yellow? on 15 August 2019 through Black Butter Records. Originally a sleeper hit in the United States in 2020, it charted internationally in 2023.

== Critical reception ==
Kitty Empire of The Observer called it a "charming retro love song" as well as "breezy, brass-laden but sprinkled with enough drug references to maintain a respectable edge". Empire also said it "channelled the vintage multicultural London sass of a young Lily Allen" and "its horns and overindulgence spoke of a love for Amy Winehouse".

== Commercial performance ==
Described as a sleeper hit, the song was released as a single in 2019, before charting on the US Billboard alternative charts in 2020. It topped the Adult Alternative Songs chart in July 2020, where it broke the record for the longest climb to number one at 27 weeks. For the chart's 25th anniversary in early 2021, the magazine ranked "Hell n Back" at number 84 on its list of the top 100 most successful songs in the chart's history. It reached the top 10 of the Alternative Airplay chart in October 2020. It was voted in at number 62 on the Triple J Hottest of 2019. It was certified gold by the Australian Recording Industry Association (ARIA) in October 2020 and silver by the British Phonographic Industry (BPI) in October 2021, before achieving platinum status in 2023. The song charted internationally in 2023 and into 2024, reaching the top 20 on the UK Singles Chart and number 15 in New Zealand.

== Remix ==
On 22 September 2023, Bakar released a remix of "Hell n Back" with American singer Summer Walker on his album Halo. Seven months after its release, the remix managed to chart on the Billboard Hot 100 at number 73 and peaking at 53.

== Usage in media ==
The song was featured in the teaser trailer for the 2023 Pixar film Elemental and the closing credits for the 2024 Paramount film Dear Santa.

== Charts ==
=== Weekly charts ===
Weekly chart performance for "Hell n Back"
Chart (2019–2024)	Peak position
Australia (ARIA)	28
Canada Hot 100 (Billboard)	47
Global 200 (Billboard)	54
Ireland (IRMA)	26
Netherlands (Single Top 100)	65
New Zealand (Recorded Music NZ)	15
Portugal (AFP)	156
Sweden (Sverigetopplistan)	80
Switzerland (Schweizer Hitparade)	92
UK Singles (Official Charts)	20
UK Hip Hop/R&B (Official Charts)	2
US Billboard Hot 100	53
US Adult Pop Airplay (Billboard)	18
US Hot Rock & Alternative Songs (Billboard)	6
US Pop Airplay (Billboard)	20
US Rock & Alternative Airplay (Billboard)	16

=== Year-end charts ===
2020 year-end chart performance for "Hell n Back"
Chart (2020)	Position
US Hot Rock & Alternative Songs (Billboard)	91

2023 year-end chart performance for "Hell n Back"
Chart (2023)	Position
US Hot Rock & Alternative Songs (Billboard)	16
US Mainstream Top 40 (Billboard)	50

2024 year-end chart performance for "Hell n Back"
Chart (2024)	Position
US Hot Rock & Alternative Songs (Billboard)	65

== Certifications ==
Certifications for "Hell n Back"
Region	Certification	Certified units/sales
Australia (ARIA)	4× Platinum	280,000^{‡}
Canada (Music Canada)	3× Platinum	240,000^{‡}
Denmark (IFPI Danmark)	Platinum	90,000^{‡}
France (SNEP)	Platinum	200,000^{‡}
New Zealand (RMNZ)	4× Platinum	120,000^{‡}
Poland (ZPAV)	Gold	25,000^{‡}
Portugal (AFP)	Gold	5,000^{‡}
United Kingdom (BPI)	2× Platinum	1,200,000^{‡}
United States (RIAA)	Platinum	1,000,000^{‡}
^{‡} Sales+streaming figures based on certification alone.
