= Ten New Messages =

Studio album by the Rakes
- Released: 19 March 2007
- Recorded: Mayfair Studios, London; The Chapel Studios, London; West Point Studios, London; Autumn 2006
- Length: 39:03
- Label: V2 Records
- Producers: Jim Abbiss, Brendan Lynch

The Rakes chronology
Capture/Release (2005)	Ten New Messages (2007)	Klang (2009)

Singles from Ten New Messages
- 1. "We Danced Together" Released: 12 March 2007; 2. "The World Was a Mess But His Hair Was Perfect" Released: 16 July 2007

Professional ratings
Review scores
Source	Rating
AllMusic	link
Drowned in Sound	link
The Guardian	4/5 stars
musicOMH	4/5 stars
NME	link
Pitchfork	(5.9/10) link
playlouder	3.5/5 stars
Q	4/5 stars
Rocklouder	link
Stylus Magazine	C+

Ten New Messages is the second album from London-based indie rock band the Rakes. The album was released on 19 March 2007 and reached number 38. The first single from the album—"We Danced Together"—was released on 12 March 2007, reaching number 38 on the British singles chart. The second single is "The World Was a Mess But His Hair Was Perfect," and was released on 16 July 2007.

Speaking about the album, lead singer Alan Donohoe said, "The album was inspired by a combination of choral music, the television show 24, Bond theme tunes, World War I poets and the Sugababes".

The Rakes also went on their biggest ever UK tour, playing 11 gigs over 13 days in March 2007.

== Track listing ==
On 16 January 2007 the track listing for the album was confirmed on the band's official website. It is as follows:

1. "The World Was a Mess but His Hair Was Perfect" – 5:02
2. "Little Superstitions" – 3:51
3. "We Danced Together" – 3:53
4. "Trouble" – 3:16
5. "Suspicious Eyes" (featuring Laura Marling)- 3:48
6. "On a Mission" – 3:06
7. "Down with Moonlight" – 3:56
8. "When Tom Cruise Cries" – 4:48
9. "Time to Stop Talking" – 3:38
10. "Leave the City and Come Home" – 3:45

=== Japanese bonus tracks ===
11. "Cold"
12. "Dangerous"
13. "We Danced Together" (SebastiAn Remix)
