= Limbo (Royal Blood song) =

Single by Royal Blood

from the album Typhoons
- Released: 25 March 2021
- Recorded: 2020
- Genre: Hard rock; disco; glam rock
- Length: 4:53
- Label: Warner
- Composers: Mike Kerr; Ben Thatcher
- Lyricist: Mike Kerr
- Producer: Royal Blood

Royal Blood singles chronology
"Typhoons" (2021)	"Limbo" (2021)	"Honeybrains" (2022)

"Limbo" is a song by English rock band Royal Blood, and was released on 25 March 2021 as the third single from their third studio album Typhoons.

== Composition ==
The song has been described as a mixture of the band's hard rock blended with elements of disco and glam rock.

== Critical reception ==
Joe Divita, writing for Loudwire said of "Limbo" that the song, "subtly discharges a tense, modern rhythm that ebbs with its start-stop/push-pull mentality, while aspects of dance music (electronica, disco) overflow and gradually build in layers.

== Music video ==
The band released the music video to "Limbo" on 1 April 2021. The music video was directed by Portuguese film director, João Retorta and shot in Kyiv, Ukraine.

== Live performances ==
The first live performance of the song was on 27 March 2021, where the band gave a virtual performance of the song on the video game, Roblox.

== Track listing ==
7"; digital download; streaming
No.	Title	Length
1.	"Limbo"	4:53

Digital download – orchestral version
No.	Title	Length
1.	"Limbo" (orchestral version) (Amazon original)	4:50

Digital download – remix
No.	Title	Length
1.	"Limbo" (SebastiAn remix)	5:30

== Charts ==
Chart (2021)	Peak position
Hungary (Rádiós Top 40)	35
Hungary (Single Top 40)	11
