= 22 Grand Job =

Single by the Rakes

from the album Capture/Release
- Released: 3 May 2004 / 31 October 2005
- Genre: Art rock
- Length: 1:53
- Label: V2 Records
- Songwriters: Alan Donohoe, Jamie Hornsmith, Lasse Petersen and Matthew Swinnerton.

The Rakes singles chronology
"22 Grand Job" (2004)	"Strasbourg" (2004)

"22 Grand Job" is the debut single by English indie rock band the Rakes, from their debut album, Capture/Release. The song did not chart upon its initial release in 2004, but a re-release the following year proved moderately successful, charting in the UK top 40 at number 39. When headlining Brixton Academy in 2007, the Rakes claimed it was their best song to date.

As of April 2026, 22 grand (£22,000 GBP) adjusted for inflation was approximately equivalent to 44 grand (£44,000 GBP).

== Track listings ==
CD 1 (B000BCHJWY)

1. "22 Grand Job" (1:53)
2. "iProblem" (3:39)

CD 2 (B000BCHJWE)

1. "22 Grand Job" (1:53)
2. "Pass the Metro" (2:39)
3. "22 Grand Job" (Filthy Dukes Society mix) (4:25)
