= Nobody's Home (album) =

Studio album by Bakar
- Released: 25 February 2022
- Recorded: 2020–2021
- Genre: Indie rock; alternative pop
- Length: 47:33
- Label: Black Butter
- Producer: Zach Nahome

Bakar chronology
Will You Be My Yellow? (2019)	Nobody's Home (2022)	Halo (2023)

Nobody's Home is the debut album by British musician Bakar, released on 25 February 2022 through Black Butter Records. It was produced by Zach Nahome. The album received favourable reviews from critics and debuted at number 31 on the UK Albums Chart.

== Critical reception ==
Professional ratings
Aggregate scores
Source	Rating
Metacritic	72/100
Review scores
Source	Rating
Clash	8/10
DIY	4/5 stars
The Line of Best Fit	6/10
The Observer	3/5 stars

Nobody's Home received a score of 72 out of 100 at review aggregator Metacritic based on four critics' reviews, indicating "generally favorable" reception. Reviewing the album for Clash, Isabella Miller described the album as "a collection of moving gems that have the potential to evoke heartbreak" and called it a fusion of "indie rock, alt pop, ravey elements, and SoundCloud rap developments" that "proves how each genre can complement each other – a testament to the songwriter's artistry". Kitty Empire of The Observer found the album to be "eloquent if uneven" and "much of this record's short and sharp 14-track, 48-minute duration is given over to various kinds of guitar-borne anomie – London stories, Bakar stories", calling it "an album that has a spectacularly strong sense of place – London, NW1 and NW3 – and some very definitive British musical reference points".

Sarah Taylor of DIY wrote that Bakar "oscillates between the personal and political in an exploration of identity" on Nobody's Home and felt that "no two songs sound the same here, as Bakar borrows from indie rock and alternative pop, hip hop and gospel". Taylor concluded that with his "emotive vocal delivery and brutally honest lyricism, Bakar has produced an impressive and accomplished debut", calling it "well worth the wait". The Line of Best Fit's Leo Culp found that Bakar "spends the album as veiled as he is on the cover", writing that the "underbelly of punk threaded throughout has never fluctuated more from song to song than on this album" although "his ventures into other genres are successful even as they feel distant from the music of past releases".

== Track listing ==
Nobody's Home track listing
No.	Title	Length
1.	"Noun"	3:18
2.	"Youthenasia"	4:05
3.	"The Mission"	3:11
4.	"Reclaim!"	3:39
5.	"Not from Here"	4:12
6.	"Ginger Pubes"	4:01
7.	"Alone Again"	3:39
8.	"Runaway"	2:35
9.	"Riot"	1:50
10.	"Free"	3:07
11.	"Change of Heart"	1:18
12.	"NW3"	3:53
13.	"Gotham"	4:19
14.	"Build Me a Way"	4:26
Total length:		47:33

== Charts ==
Chart performance for Nobody's Home
Chart (2022)	Peak position
Scottish Albums (OCC)	42
UK Albums (OCC)	31
