= Revl9n =

Band

- Origin: Sweden
- Genres: Pop; Dance; Electropop; Synthpop
- Years active: 2002 – present
- Members: Maria Eilersen; Nandor Hegedüs
- Past members: Åsa Cederqvist
- Website: Revl9n.se

Revl9n is a female-fronted electropop band from Sweden. Their releases include the 2006 album "Revl9n" (published by Because / Wagram Music), which includes the videos for the singles "Someone Like You", "Walking Machine" and "United" as bonus content. The single "Walking Machine" features remixes by Hot Chip and SebastiAn.
