= Klang (album) =

Studio album by the Rakes
- Released: 23 March 2009
- Recorded: East German Government Center for Radio Broadcasting Services, Berlin
- Genres: Indie rock, post-punk revival
- Label: V2
- Producers: Chris Zane, The Rakes

The Rakes chronology
Ten New Messages (2007)	Klang (2009)

Alternative cover
- Bonus Track Edition cover

Singles from Klang
- 1. "1989" Released: 16 March 2009; 2. "That's the Reason" Released: 1 June 2009

Professional ratings
Review scores
Source	Rating
AllMusic	3.5/5 stars
BBC	(favourable)
Clash	(favourable)
The Guardian	4/5 stars
MusicOMH	2.5/5 stars
NME	(7/10)
Pitchfork	(6.1/10)
PopMatters	(6/10)
The Skinny	4/5 stars
Spin	3/5 stars
This Is Fake DIY	(6/10)
UNCUT	4/5 stars

Klang is the third and final studio album by English indie rock band the Rakes, released on 23 March 2009. The album was preceded by the first single "1989" on 16 March. The Rakes recorded the album with Chris Zane in Berlin, Germany, a decision that lead singer Alan Donohoe explained is because "The London music scene is so dull--it's like wading through a swamp of shit. We just wanted to be somewhere more inspiring." Hence the name of the album which is the German word for 'sound'.

== Track listing ==
1. "You're in It"
2. "That's the Reason"
3. "The Loneliness of the Outdoor Smoker"
4. "Bitchin' in the Kitchin'"
5. "The Woes of the Working Woman"
6. "1989"
7. "Shackleton"
8. "The Light from Your Mac"
9. "Muller's Ratchet"
10. "The Final Hill"
11. "Demons" (iTunes Bonus Track)

== Personnel ==
=== The Rakes ===
- Alan Donohoe – vocals
- Jamie Hornsmith – bass guitar
- Lasse Petersen – drums
- Matthew Swinnerton – lead guitar

=== Additional musicians ===
- Chris Ketley – guitar, piano
