= We Danced Together =

Single by the Rakes

from the album Ten New Messages
- Released: 12 March 2007
- Recorded: The Chapel; Mayfair Studios
- Genre: Alternative rock
- Length: 3:32 (radio edit); 3:53 (album version)
- Label: V2 Records
- Songwriter(s): Alan Donohoe, Jamie Horn-Smith, Lasse Petersen, Matthew Swinnerton
- Producer(s): Jim Abbiss, Brendan Lynch

The Rakes singles chronology
"All Too Human" (2006)	"We Danced Together" (2007)	"The World Was a Mess But His Hair Was Perfect" (2007)

"We Danced Together" is a song by English band the Rakes, released in March 2007 as the first single from their second album Ten New Messages. It reached No. 38 on the UK Singles Chart.

== Track listings ==
CD

1. "We Danced Together" - 3:53
2. "Cold" - 3:16
3. "We Danced Together" (SebastiAn Remix) - 3:09
4. "We Danced Together" (Jape Remix) - 3:22

7" vinyl

1. "We Danced Together" - 3:53
2. "Dangerous" - 2:16
