= Bakar (musician) =

British singer

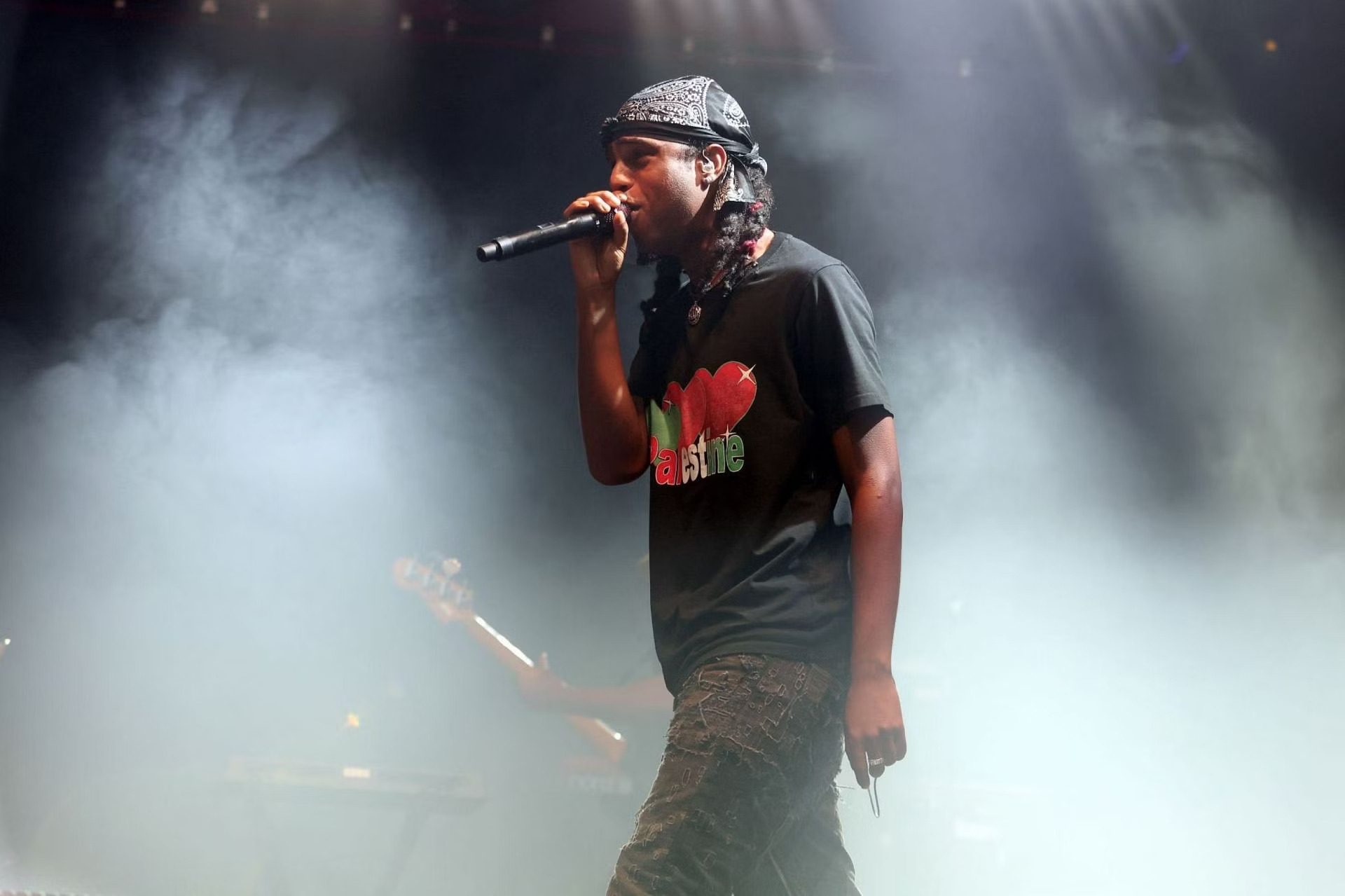
- Bakar performs live in Reading, 2022

Background information
- Born: Abubakar Baker Shariff-Farr; 12 February 1994 (age 32); Camden Town, London, England
- Genres: Indie rock; neo soul; R&B; hip hop; pop
- Occupation: Singer-songwriter
- Years active: 2015–present
- Label: Black Butter
- Website: bakar.world

Abubakar Baker Shariff-Farr (born 12 February 1994), known mononymously as Bakar, is an English singer. Known for his experimental indie rock style, he gained recognition in 2019 with his single "Hell n Back", the single he is most commonly associated with. He released his debut album Nobody's Home on February 25, 2022. He released his second album, Halo, on September 22, 2023.

== Early life ==
Bakar grew up in Camden in North London and attended a state school before being sent to a boarding school in Surrey by his mother. He is of Yemeni and Tanzanian descent. He expressed that "going outside of London and hearing other tastes and how that can relate to [him], it definitely did something to [him]."

== Career ==
=== 2015–2017: Online beginnings and solo debut ===
Bakar began creating music in 2015 by cutting up samples of Bombay Bicycle Club and King Krule songs and uploading them to an anonymous SoundCloud account. For the next few years, he continuously uploaded projects and works to the platform, several of which are no longer available.

Bakar officially independently released his debut single, "Big Dreams" in March 2017. In 2018, the song later gained popularity after being featured on the official soundtrack of the video game FIFA 19. Bakar performed the song "Scott Free" on the online German music series ColorsxStudios in March 2017, where it has amassed over 300 thousand views as of July 2020. Before the end of 2017, Bakar had self-released the non-album singles "Small Town Girl" and "Something I Said".

=== 2018: Badkid ===
In early 2018, Bakar released the single "Million Miles" and announced his debut full length project, Badkid. In April 2018, he released the project's third single, "All In", following the lead single "Big Dreams" (2017) and "Million Miles" (2018). Bakar performed at Live at Leeds in May 2018, where he was described by NME as an "electrifying performer" who "cemented himself as one of Britain's most exciting new acts". He released "Badlands" as the final single off of Badkid a week later. Bakar's performance set at The Great Escape in May 2018 was also well received by critics. Badkid was released as a mixtape under Bakar's own record label,*bash, on 22 May 2018. He marked the release of the mixtape with a headlining performance at Camden Assembly in London. He announced a headlining tour of the United Kingdom including a performance at The Dome in London. After completing the sold out tour, Bakar released the non-album single "Dracula" in October 2018.

=== 2019–2020: Will You Be My Yellow? ===
Bakar signed to both Black Butter Records and September Management in early 2019. In January 2019, American rapper Sheck Wes mentioned a future collaboration with Bakar. In March 2019, Bakar released the non-album single set "Chill" and "Sold Your Soul" alongside the announcement of another headlining European tour, Bakar & The Badkids. In August 2019, Bakar announced the release of the EP, Will You Be My Yellow?, and released its lead single "Hell n Back". The single became a sleeper hit in the United States, experiencing the longest trip to No. 1 on the Triple A chart in Billboard chart history, eventually peaking on 30 June 2020 (its 27th week). "Hell n Back" was also certified Gold in Australia in 2020, where the song also placed No. 62 on triple j's Hottest 100 of 2019. The six-track EP Will You Be My Yellow? was released to critical acclaim under Black Butter Records on 20 September 2019. The project was written and recorded within just eight weeks, and was produced by frequent collaborators Zach Nahome and Matty Tavares. It featured the track "Stop Selling Her Drugs" featuring American musician Dominic Fike.

In November 2019, Bakar performed "Hell n Back" for his second performance on the German music series ColorsxStudios, following his first performance "Scott Free" in March 2017. The former was released commercially as a non-album single and has amassed over one million views on YouTube as of July 2020. In November 2019, British singer Collard released the single "Stone" featuring Bakar. In December 2019, the song "Hell n Back" was used in the promotional ad for Arsenal F.C. x Adidas's Bruised Banana range, highlighting the lyric "Will you be my yellow?" which Bakar sings in the video.

=== 2020–present: Nobody’s Home, "Hell n Back" and Halo ===
In February 2020, Bakar performed "Circles" by Mac Miller on BBC Radio 1Xtra as a tribute to the late rapper. Bakar was featured alongside American producer Kenny Beats on New Zealand singer Benee's single "Night Garden". He was featured on The Tonight Show Starring Jimmy Fallon in 2021, performing "The Mission". Bakar's debut album, Nobody's Home, was released on February 25, 2022, and peaked at number 31 on the UK Albums Chart. "Hell n Back" was the featured song in the teaser trailer for the 2023 Pixar film Elemental. Bakar performed at the 22nd Coachella Valley Music and Arts Festival in April 2023.

Bakar's second album, Halo, was released on September 22, 2023, on Black Butter Records.

== Artistry and other ventures ==
Musical influences cited by Bakar include Madlib and Foals. He has described his music as "schizophrenic", and said that he attempts to "bridge the gap" between different music genres. Ones to Watch described his style as a "melting pot of indie, rap, rock, and punk".

Bakar also modelled as part of Virgil Abloh's debut runway show for Louis Vuitton twice: once in June 2018 and again in February 2019. In November 2019, he modelled for Prada's "A Gift to Give" campaign alongside models Pixie Geldof and Sara Blomqvist.

== Reception ==
Joe Goggins of DIY compared Bakar's vocal style to that of Kele Okereke from Bloc Party. Alex McFadyen of Clash also compared his sound to that of Bloc Party. Ashleigh Kane of Crack Magazine deemed him as "indie's revivalist". Bakar's style has been noted as a progressive shift from the 'stale' sound of British rock in the late 2010s. Bakar has received endorsements from artists like Skepta, Elton John and fashion designer Virgil Abloh.

== Discography ==
=== Studio albums ===
Title	Details	Peak chart positions		
Title	Details	UK	AUS Hit.	SCO
Nobody's Home	Released: 25 February 2022; Label: Black Butter; Formats: Digital download, streaming	31	—	42
Halo	Released: 22 September 2023; Label: Black Butter; Formats: Digital download, streaming	15	5	20
"—" denotes a recording that did not chart or was not released in that territory.

=== Mixtapes ===
- Badkid (2018)

=== Extended plays ===
- Will You Be My Yellow? (2019)
- Beastie (2025)

=== Singles ===
==== As lead artist ====
List of singles as lead artist, with selected chart positions shown
Title	Year	Peak chart positions										Certifications	Album
Title	Year	UK	AUS	CAN	IRE	POR	NLD	NZ	SWE	US	US Rock	Certifications	Album
"Big Dreams"	2017	—	—	—	—	—	—	—	—	—	—		Badkid
"Small Town Girl"	2017	—	—	—	—	—	—	—	—	—	—		Non-album singles
"Something I Said"	2017	—	—	—	—	—	—	—	—	—	—		Non-album singles
"Million Miles"	2018	—	—	—	—	—	—	—	—	—	—		Non-album singles
"All In"	2018	—	—	—	—	—	—	—	—	—	—		Badkid
"Badlands"	2018	—	—	—	—	—	—	—	—	—	—		Badkid
"Dracula"	2018	—	—	—	—	—	—	—	—	—	—		Non-album singles
"Chill"	2019	—	—	—	—	—	—	—	—	—	—		Non-album singles
"Hell n Back" (solo or featuring Summer Walker)	2019	20	28	47	26	156	65	15	80	53	6	BPI: Platinum; AFP: Gold; ARIA: 4× Platinum; MC: 3× Platinum; RIAA: Platinum; RMNZ: 4× Platinum	Will You Be My Yellow?
"1st Time"	2020	— (Note: "1st Time" did not enter the UK Singles Chart, but peaked at number 22 on the UK Physical Singles Sales Chart.)	—	—	—	—	—	—	—	—	— (Note: "1st Time" did not enter the US Hot Rock & Alternative Songs chart, but peaked at number 19 on the Rock & Alternative Airplay chart.)		Non-album singles
"Play" (featuring Lancey Foux)	2020	—	—	—	—	—	—	—	—	—	—		Non-album singles
"The Mission"	2021	—	—	—	—	—	—	—	—	—	— (Note: "The Mission" did not enter the US Hot Rock & Alternative Songs chart, but peaked at number 31 on the Rock & Alternative Airplay chart.)		Nobody's Home
"Free"	2022	—	—	—	—	—	—	—	—	—	— (Note: "Free" did not enter the US Hot Rock & Alternative Songs chart, but peaked at number 28 on the Rock & Alternative Airplay chart.)		Nobody's Home
"In Disguise" (with Aitch)	2022	—	—	—	—	—	—	—	—	—	—		Close to Home
"Good News"	2023	—	—	—	—	—	—	—	—	—	— (Note: "Good News" did not enter the US Hot Rock & Alternative Songs chart, but peaked at number 32 on the Adult Alternative Songs chart.)		Non-album single
"Alive!"	2023	—	—	—	—	—	—	—	—	—	— (Note: "Alive!" did not enter the US Hot Rock & Alternative Songs chart, but peaked at number 39 on the Rock & Alternative Airplay chart.)		Halo
"Right Here, for Now"	2023	—	—	—	—	—	—	—	—	—	—		Halo
"I'm Done"	2023	—	—	—	—	—	—	—	—	—	—		Halo
"—" denotes a recording that did not chart or was not released in that territory.

==== As featured artist ====
List of singles as featured artist with year released and release group
Title	Year	Peak chart positions		Album/EP
Title	Year	BEL (FL) Tip	NZ Hot	Album/EP
"Hell of a Heart" (Jaxxon D. Silva featuring Bakar)	2017	—	—	Open to Closure
"Like a River" (Shy Luv featuring Bakar)	2017	—	—	Lungs
"Sober" (SebastiAn featuring Bakar)	2019	—	—	Thirst
"Stone" (Collard featuring Bakar)	2019	—	—	Non-album single
"Night Garden" (Benee featuring Kenny Beats and Bakar)	2020	26	4	Hey U X
"We Found It" (Myd featuring Bakar)	2021	—	—	Born a Loser
"—" denotes a recording that did not chart or was not released in that territory.

=== Guest appearances ===
Title	Year	Other performer(s)	Album/EP
"$even"	2017	Yeek	Sebastian
"Lock and Load"	2017	Milkavelli	Cult Member
"Ghetto Yout"	2019	Lancey Foux, Monkey 67, Clairo	Friend Or Foux

=== SoundCloud releases ===
- Happy BDay To Me - EP (2015)
- "Little Secret" - Single (2016)
- "Sharing is Caring" - Single (2016)
- "Best For You" - Single (2017)
- "New Day" - Single (2017)
- "i-D" - Single (2020)
