= Capture/Release =

Studio album by the Rakes
- Released: 15 August 2005
- Recorded: 2004–2005
- Genre: Post-punk revival
- Length: 41:23
- Label: V2 Records
- Producers: Paul Epworth, the Rakes

The Rakes chronology
Capture/Release (2005)	Ten New Messages (2007)

Singles from Capture/Release
- 1. "22 Grand Job" Released: 3 May 2004; 2. "Strasbourg" Released: 27 September 2004; 3. "Retreat" Released: 18 April 2005; 4. "Work, Work, Work (Pub, Club, Sleep)" Released: 1 August 2005; 5. "22 Grand Job" Released: 31 October 2005 (reissue); 6. "All Too Human" Released: 27 February 2006

Capture/Release is the debut album by the Rakes, released on 15 August 2005. The album peaked at number 32 on the UK. NME named it the 13th best album of 2005 and it received a generally positive critical response. It was released in the US on 18 April 2006 with the additional track "All Too Human".

== Reception ==
Professional ratings
Aggregate scores
Source	Rating
Metacritic	75/100
Review scores
Source	Rating
AllMusic	4/5 stars
The A.V. Club	B+
Blender	4/5 stars
Entertainment Weekly	B
The Guardian	3/5 stars
The Irish Times	4/5 stars
NME	9/10
Pitchfork	6.3/10
Rolling Stone	3.5/5 stars
The Village Voice	A−

In his review for NME, Mark Beaumont described the Rakes as a "European Strokes", while drawing further comparisons to Franz Ferdinand, Pete Doherty and OMD. He concluded that Capture/Release is "a great pop record that makes you forget all those shitty spreadsheets and dance like no-one's earning more than you".

== Track listing ==
All songs written by Alan Donohoe, Jamie Hornsmith, Lasse Petersen and Matthew Swinnerton.

1. "Strasbourg" – 2:30
2. "Retreat" – 2:58
3. "22 Grand Job" – 1:46
4. "Open Book" – 2:17
5. "The Guilt" – 3:47
6. "Binary Love" – 3:45
7. "We Are All Animals" – 4:08
8. "Violent" – 2:34
9. "T Bone" – 3:36
10. "Terror!" – 2:54
11. "Work, Work, Work (Pub, Club, Sleep)" – 4:07
12. "All Too Human" (US release) – 3:30

=== Japanese bonus tracks ===
13. "Wish You Were Here" – 2:13
14. "Automaton" – 2:00

== Personnel ==
- Alan Donohoe – vocals
- Jamie Hornsmith – bass guitar
- Lasse Petersen – drums
- Matthew Swinnerton – lead guitar
