= Total (Sebastian album) =

Studio album by Sebastian
- Released: May 30, 2011
- Recorded: A.S. Studio
- Genres: House; electro house; experimental; glitch
- Length: 51:14
- Labels: Ed Banger; Because
- Producer: Sebastian

Sebastian chronology
Remixes (2008)	Total (2011)	Thirst (2019)

Singles from Total
- 1. "Embody" Released: April 4, 2011; 2. "C.T.F.O." Released: August 22, 2011; 3. "Love in Motion" Released: March 12, 2012

Total is the debut studio album by French electronic artist Sebastian. The album was released in Europe on May 30, 2011, and in North America on June 7, 2011, by Ed Banger Records. The album was announced in February with an "X-rated" teaser. This was followed by a video for the first single "Embody" directed by So Me featuring dancer Shamari Maurice, which was released on 4 April with remixes from DJ Premier and Kavinsky. The album features M.I.A., Mayer Hawthorne, and production from Gaspard Augé of Justice.

== Cover art ==
Jean-Baptiste Mondino photographed the cover art. The image of Sebastian kissing himself has sparked controversy, misunderstanding and confusion among fans and viewers. Sebastian elucidates the cover art in an interview:

I rarely do things for a specific reason: for a start, the idea of a double kissing itself represents my vision of the artistic posture; it’s a serious joke on an artist's relationship with his ego. Also, my first covers were a tracing of my face, so I wanted to follow that idea with a photograph while adding something new. When you play a game, you should play it all the way or not at all. So, for instance, even if you don't like your face, you should embrace it, emphasise it, even! The choice of black and white is to break with the often very colourful techno graphics. The cover signed by Mondino symbolises the total desire of the creator, the absolute ego of the artist who kisses and devours himself.

== Reception ==
Professional ratings
Aggregate scores
Source	Rating
Metacritic	66/100
Review scores
Source	Rating
AllMusic	link
BBC Music	(Positive) link
DIY	8/10 link
Mojo	3/5 stars
NME	6/10 link
Pitchfork	5.6/10 link
Q	3/5 stars
Robert Christgau	A− link
Tiny Mix Tapes	link

Total received positive reviews from music critics. At Metacritic, the album received an average score of 66, based on 11 reviews, indicating "generally favourable reviews." AllMusic writer K. Ross Hoffman gave a positive review to the album, awarded it 4 out of 5 stars and called it "more familiar, trashy, glitch-funk maximalism" and wrote: "Whether you'll want to cherry-pick favorites or wade through the whole unwieldy mess may depend on context, but there's no denying that, a half-decade late or not, SebastiAn has delivered." Matthew Horton of DIY supported the artist for the cover of the album and said: "this represents the "absolute ego of the artist" and also praised the album with a score of 8 out of 10 and called it "fun, thrilling and boisterous".

Tiny Mix Tapes rewarded the album with 4.5 stars out of 5 and complimented: "The timing may be off, but Total transcends trends to be one of the year's best dance records, and a likely cult classic in the making." Mike Diver of BBC Music gave a very positive review to the album and wrote: "There are moments where Total does come close to a Daft Punk pastiche. But these are few and far between, and there's plenty enough of SebastiAn's character on show to make this one of the most enjoyable dance albums of 2011 so far." Q magazine gave a mixed review and commented, "Twenty-two tracks long, Total is an eclectic joyride through myriad musical styles; the beauty being that none sticks around long enough to get boring." Mojo magazine gave it 3 stars out of 5 and said: "It's difficult to ignore Total's hoovering synths, filtered drums, glam rock rhythms and punkish snarl, such is its fizzing energy." NME gave a mixed review to the album, awarding it 6 out of 10 and also wrote: "Total couldn't be more mid-noughties if it came dressed in a geometric hoodie, and the result is a chopped-up, sample-heavy stew that's a whole load of fun if the Tales Of The Jackalope shebang was your Hacienda."

== Track listing ==
All tracks composed and produced by Sébastien Akchoté except where noted.

No.	Title	Writer(s)	Producer(s)	Length
1.	"Hudson River"			0:50
2.	"Love in Motion" (featuring Mayer Hawthorne)	Akchoté; Hawthorne		3:05
3.	"Tough Games" (Interlude)			0:40
4.	"Embody"			3:45
5.	"Ross Ross Ross"			3:39
6.	"Fried"			4:03
7.	"Kindercut"			4:06
8.	"Water Games" (Interlude)			0:37
9.	"Total"			1:21
10.	"Jack Wire" (Instrumental Version)			2:44
11.	"C.T.F.O" (featuring M.I.A.)	Akchoté; M.I.A.		2:55
12.	"Cartoon" (Interlude)			0:34
13.	"Arabest"			3:16
14.	"Prime"			3:06
15.	"Mean Games" (Interlude)			0:53
16.	"Tetra"	Akchoté; Gaspard Augé	Sebastian; Augé	2:54
17.	"Motor"			4:03
18.	"Night" (Interlude)			0:46
19.	"Yes"			3:42
20.	"Bird Games" (Interlude)			0:37
21.	"Doggg"			3:12
22.	"Frustra" (Outro)			0:26
Total length:				51:14

iTunes bonus track
No.	Title	Length
23.	"Organia"	2:36
Total length:		53:50

== Charts ==
Chart (2011)	Peak position
French Albums (SNEP)	63
UK Dance Albums (Official Charts)	22
US Top Dance Albums (Billboard)	17
