= FIFA 21 =

Football simulation game

- Current Gen Standard cover art featuring Paris Saint-Germain player Kylian Mbappé
- Developers: EA Vancouver; EA Romania
- Publisher: EA Sports
- Series: FIFA
- Engine: Frostbite 3
- Platforms: Microsoft Windows; Nintendo Switch; PlayStation 4; Xbox One; Stadia; PlayStation 5; Xbox Series X/S
- Release: Microsoft Windows, Nintendo Switch, PS4, Xbox One; 9 October 2020; PS5, Xbox Series X/S; 3 December 2020; Stadia; 17 March 2021
- Genre: Sports
- Modes: Single-player, multiplayer

FIFA 21 is an association football simulation video game published by Electronic Arts as part of the FIFA series. It is the 28th installment in the FIFA series, and was released on 9 October 2020 for Microsoft Windows, Nintendo Switch, PlayStation 4, and Xbox One. Enhanced versions for the PlayStation 5 and Xbox Series X and Series S were released on 3 December 2020, in addition to a version for Stadia in March 2021. The online servers for the game for Stadia were shut down on 18 January 2023, whilst the online servers for all other platforms were shut down on 6 November 2023.

== Features ==
=== Ultimate Team ===
Ultimate Team features 100 icon players, including 11 new names: Eric Cantona, Petr Čech, Ashley Cole, Samuel Eto'o, Philipp Lahm, Ferenc Puskás, Bastian Schweinsteiger, Davor Šuker, Fernando Torres, Nemanja Vidić, and Xavi all feature as icons for the first time. Jens Lehmann was not featured as an icon in FUT 21 compared to previous games.

Ultimate Team sees the addition of a co-op gameplay feature in the form of Division Rivals, Squad Battles and Friendlies with a friend online to unlock objectives and rewards. FUT was surrounded by controversy due to it being classified as a loot box and a source of online gambling. In January 2019, EA agreed to stop selling FIFA points in Belgium, following government pressure. Petitions to ban the points elsewhere began in June 2020, with the points' legality being debated in the US and UK, the latter via the UK's Department of Digital, Culture, Media and Sport. Similarly, a Dutch judge decided that EA should be fined €0.5 million per week until the loot boxes were removed. The players can customize their own FUT stadium with tifos, pyrotechnics, trophies, music, statues and stands as their FUT club grows. In-game stats can now be upgraded individually for special cards (the example given is if Trent Alexander-Arnold scored a free-kick for a TOTW in-form item, the free-kick accuracy can be much higher than his other in-form items). Live FUT friendlies combines house rules with squad rules to create different match types that change throughout the year. Redesigned menus allow the access to their squad and stadium directly from anywhere in the main menu. In new FUT events, the players can pick sides and compete against the FUT community to unlock packs, coins, club items or players in Team Event Objectives. The players can work together with the entire community and earn shared rewards by completing objectives as a collective.

The Top 100 has been expanded to Top 200 in FUT Champions. 30 matches in Division Rivals contribute to their weekly rating. They can play more matches for skill points and FUT Champions points but they won't increase own rank. Players can make extra coin rewards when they get promoted to a new division for the first time in Division Rivals. Squad Battles can be used to determine their rivals division at the start of FUT 21.

Fitness and training consumable items have been removed from the game. Players still lose fitness and stamina during a match, but automatically start their next game at full fitness. Healing items have been simplified to just gold common and rare items.

The player's club can be transferred from PlayStation 4 to PlayStation 5, and from Xbox One to Xbox Series X and Series S, but not from PlayStation to Xbox or vice versa.

On 9 September 2020, EA Released the Ultimate Team ratings of the Top 100 Players. Barcelona forward Lionel Messi topped the list with a rating of 93, followed by Juventus forward Cristiano Ronaldo with a 92 rating, and Atletico Madrid goalkeeper Jan Oblak, Paris Saint-Germain forward Neymar, Manchester City midfielder Kevin De Bruyne, and Bayern Munich forward Robert Lewandowski all with 91's.

=== Career Mode ===
Career Mode sees new additions following years of criticism from the community - mainly to the manager mode. New additions include; a revamped interactive match simulation mode, which allows players to instantly jump in and out of matches in addition to changing game plans in real time. A new and improved training system which allows for weekly training schedules and the ability to train players to play in different positions, new stats such as match fitness and growth, an improved youth academy system, more transfer options such as loan to buy deals, and enhanced opposition AI.

=== VOLTA Football 21 ===
Volta Football was introduced in FIFA 20, and returns in FIFA 21. According to producers, Volta 21 has gameplay improvements and introduces new playing modes such as The Debut, the sequel to last year's story mode, featuring Zinedine Zidane, Thierry Henry, Kaká and Frank Lampard. Volta Football also features Volta Squads, an online mode where people can play with friends, and Feature Battles mode. There are also five new locations (Dubai, Milan, Paris, São Paulo and Sydney) with the addition of the VOLTA Stadium.

The story of Volta 21 is the continuation of the story of Revvy as he continues his career journey as a street footballer, taking part in a tournament in São Paulo hosted by Kaká. After Revvy's team win, Kaká invites Revvy's teammate Kotaro Tokuda to a tournament in Dubai as his team's captain. Revvy and his teammates are jealous, but Beatriz Villanova – Alex Hunter's agent – has set up a series of matches against the teams in the tournament around the World in the hopes that beating them would secure Revvy's team a place in the tournament, at the expense of one of the other teams with the agreement being Revvy will have to pay her back if his team make it to Dubai. After winning their matches in Paris, Sydney, and Milan, Revvy's team are invited to the tournament. Upon arrival, Beatriz informs the team that the teams would be managed by legendary former footballers – those Managers being Zidane, Henry, Kaká, and Lampard. Revvy chooses Henry as his team's Manager. The team go on to win the tournament, defeating Kaká's team in the final. Revvy's team then plays an exhibition match against a team consisting of the legendary players.

=== Licenses ===
The game features more than 30 official leagues, over 700 clubs, and over 17,000 players. In August 2020, EA Sports announced an exclusive multi-year partnership with Milan and Inter Milan.

Juventus, Roma, River Plate, Boca Juniors and Corinthians are not featured in FIFA 21 and instead are known as Piemonte Calcio, Roma FC, Nuñez, Buenos Aires and Oceânico FC respectively. The game retains the players' likenesses (except for Oceânico FC), but the official badge, kits and stadiums are unavailable and instead feature custom designs and generic stadiums produced by AE Sports. A lot of teams are featured in this game with licensed players and kits, but without their stadiums, most notably Bayern Munich, Barcelona, Sporting CP and Urawa Red Diamonds. The Finland national football team is fully licensed for the first time.

Elland Road, home of Leeds United, was not originally included in the game despite the club achieving promotion to the Premier League. EA stated that this was due to the season being delayed by the COVID-19 pandemic, which meant there was insufficient time for it to be included at launch. However, in February 2021, the stadium was finally added to the game, thus ensuring all 20 Premier League teams had their respective stadiums.

The Riazor, home of Deportivo de La Coruña, did not appear in FIFA 21 due to the club's relegation to Segunda B. This meant that it was one of two stadiums (along with the Stadio Olimpico), the home ground of AS Roma, to be deleted.

In November 2020, Zlatan Ibrahimović announced he is not pleased with usage of his likeness by EA Sports in its games, especially FIFA 21 and intends to take legal actions against the developer. Claiming that he didn't personally authorize EA Sports to use his likeness he was joined by Gareth Bale and also started to receive support from as many as 300 other players.

== Release ==
FIFA 21 was released worldwide on 9 October 2020 for Microsoft Windows, PlayStation 4, Xbox One and Nintendo Switch. As with previous installments, the Switch version is a "Legacy Edition", that contains updated kits, rosters, and minor updates, but does not include the new modes. The game has three official editions: Ultimate, Champions and Standard. The Ultimate and Champions editions were released on 6 October ahead of the release of the standard edition on 9 October. EA Play subscribers were able to get a 10-hour early access trial of FIFA 21 on 1 October. The game was also released on PlayStation 5, Xbox Series X/S, and Stadia in December.

FIFA 21 did not contain a demo. On 21 September 2020, the FIFA Twitter account explained their reasoning on not releasing a demo, saying they would focus on their "best full game experience for current and next-gen consoles".

=== Covers and ambassadors ===
In July 2020, Paris Saint-Germain forward Kylian Mbappé was announced as the cover star of the all three editions. Erling Haaland, Trent Alexander-Arnold, João Félix, Sam Kerr, Wu Lei, Javier Hernández, and Carlos Vela were announced as the official ambassadors of the game.

The FIFA Next ambassadors, a curated list featuring the emerging talent who embody the meaning of 'Win as One', are Mason Mount, Georgia Stanway, Phil Foden, Mallory Pugh, Steven Bergwijn, Théo Hernandez, Rodrygo, Sergiño Dest, Giovanni Reyna, Bruno Guimarães, Hwang Hee-chan, and Aaron Connolly.

=== Commentary ===
It is the first game in the series to feature neither Martin Tyler nor Alan Smith as English-language commentators since FIFA 06. They were replaced by Derek Rae and Lee Dixon.

== Reception ==
Reception

Aggregate scores
Aggregator	Score
Metacritic	NS: 33/100; PC: 74/100; PS4: 72/100; XONE: 77/100; PS5: 74/100; XSX: 74/100
OpenCritic	47% recommend

Review scores
Publication	Score
IGN	7/10
Nintendo Life	2/10
PC Gamer (UK)	70/100
Push Square	7/10
Our Culture Mag	3/5
TechRadar	3/5

According to the review aggregation website Metacritic, the Xbox One version of the game received "generally positive" reviews from critics while the PC and PS4 versions received "mixed or average" reviews. The Nintendo Switch version received "generally unfavourable" reviews from critics. Fellow review aggregator OpenCritic assessed that the game received fair approval, being recommended by 47% of critics.

IGN gave the Nintendo Switch version of FIFA 21 a 2/10, electing to largely republish the same review it previously gave FIFA 20 since the game was "virtually unchanged" from it (which itself was also largely unchanged from FIFA 19), and concluding that "if last year's release was borderline insulting, this year's is just plain disgraceful."

It was nominated for the category of Best Sports/Racing game at The Game Awards 2020, as well as Sports Game of the Year at the 24th Annual D.I.C.E. Awards.

Upon its reveal, critics and fans criticised FIFA 21's box art, calling its composition incoherent and comparing it to the cover of EA Sports UFC 4, which received similar criticism.

=== "Content granting" controversy ===
In mid-March 2021, players discovered that at least one EA employee was selling special "Icon Moment" cards from the Ultimate Team portion of the game, otherwise rare cards to be gained through grinding in the game or through microtransaction purchases with a chance to get one in new packs. These sales went for hundreds of U.S. dollars via direct sale through secret channels, rather than through the in-game trading system. This became known as "EAGate" as more players reported such sales. EA launched an investigation, reporting initially that multiple EA accounts were apparently selling these Icon Moments through the game's "content granting" mechanism, which allows EA to normally grant players Ultimate Team items at its discretion outside of normal gameplay, and later that it was indefinitely suspending the "content granting" system until they completed their investigation.
