= Sebastian (French musician) =

French musician and DJ (born 1981)

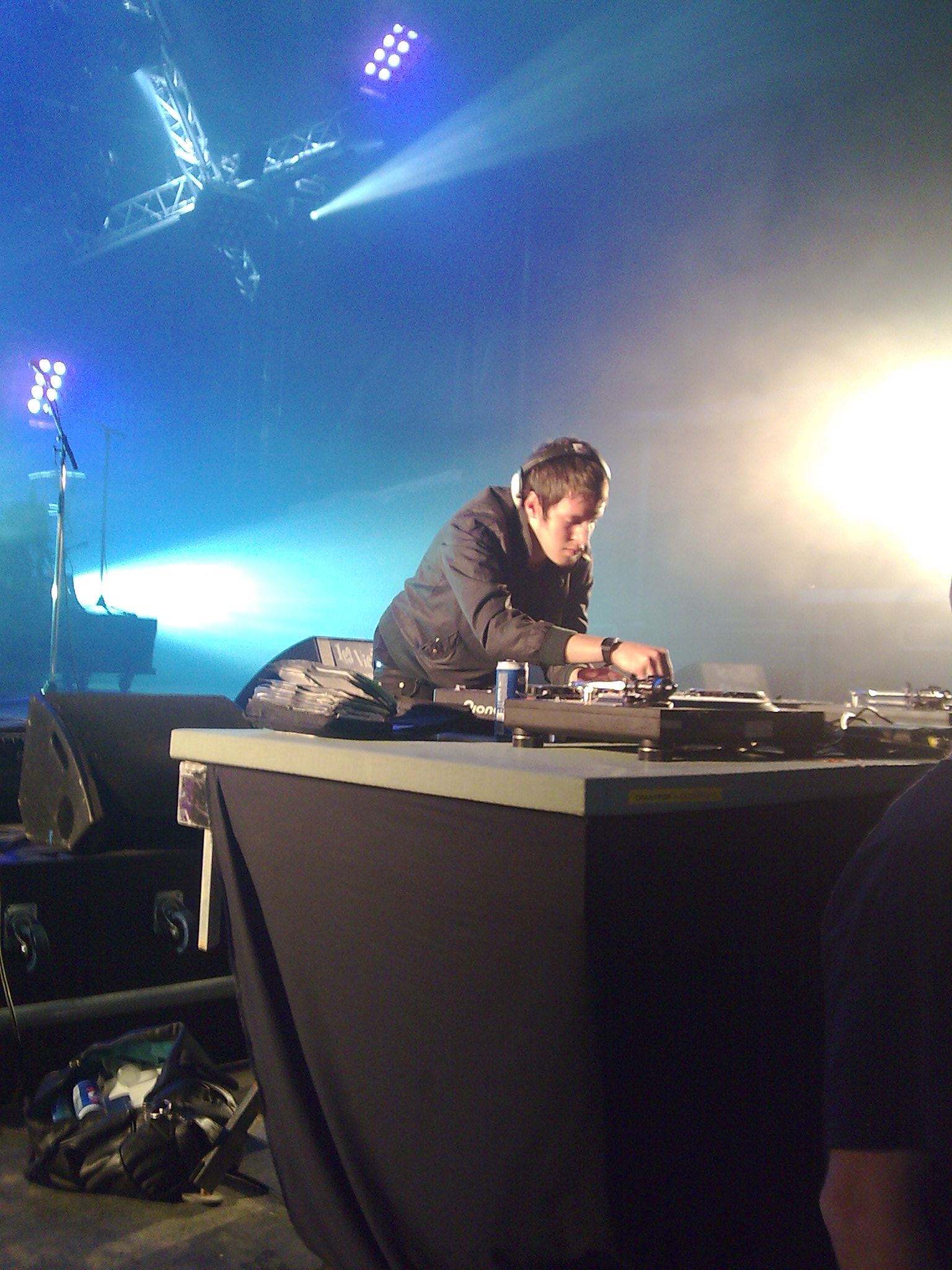
- Sebastian performing at Festival des Vieilles Charrues in 2008

Background information
- Born: Sébastien Akchoté-Božović; 3 February 1981 (age 45); Boulogne-Billancourt, France
- Genres: Electro house; electro; house; glitch; experimental
- Occupations: Record producer; DJ; composer; engineer; vocalist
- Works: Sebastian discography
- Years active: 2005–present
- Labels: Ed Banger; Because Music

Sébastien Akchoté-Božović (French pronunciation: [sebastjɛ̃ akʃote boʒɔvitʃ]; born 3 February 1981), known mononymously as Sebastian (stylised as SebastiAn, pronounced [səbastjɑ̃(n)]), is a French musician, composer, producer, mixer, engineer, vocalist and DJ affiliated with Ed Banger Records. He has worked as a solo electronic musician and as a remixer for bands and singers such as Charlotte Gainsbourg, Daft Punk, Beastie Boys, Bloc Party, and Nero. He has also composed and produced songs for Charlotte Gainsbourg, Katerine, Juliette Armanet, Kavinsky, Frank Ocean, Uffie, Woodkid, and Angèle. He composed soundtracks for the films Our Day Will Come, The World Is Yours and Steak (in which he also acted, credited under the name Sebastian Akchoté). His tracks have featured in television series and video games.

== Early life ==
Akchoté-Božović is of Serbian-French heritage. He was born in Boulogne-Billancourt and raised in Paris and Belgrade by a single mother. His first language is Serbian. He is the younger brother of independent guitarist Noël Akchoté. His early musical history included both jazz and experimental influences from his older brother, as well as hip hop influences from artists like DJ Premier and the music of Belgrade. He first started producing music around the age of fifteen.

== Career ==
While working with a hip-hop band in 2005, Sebastian was given the phone number for Ed Banger Records by one of the band's members, who had found it in a newspaper. After a cold call to label owner Pedro Winter, Sebastian was signed, and they released the EPs H.A.L. and Smoking Kills (?) later that year. 2005 also saw his remixes for Annie, Benjamin Theves, and Daft Punk, whose "Human After All" remix by Sebastian is said to be the duo's all-time favourite remix of their own work.

In the summer of 2006, Ed Banger Records released the EP Ross Ross Ross. That year also saw more remixes by Sebastian than any other.

In 2007, he composed the soundtrack for Quentin Dupieux's film Steak alongside Sebastien Tellier and Mr. Oizo (Dupieux himself). He also appears in the film in the role of Felix, one of the members of the Chivers. Also that year, as well producing numerous remixes and releasing his Walkman 2 EP, Sebastian joined Kavinsky to open with DJ sets for Daft Punk on their Alive 2007 tour. An original song called "Greel" was also released in 2007 on Ed Banger's compilation Ed Rec Vol. 2.

There were two Sebastian releases in 2008: Motor, an EP with three original tracks, and Remixes, a 17-track compilation featuring various remixes produced by Sebastian. His track "Dog" was also included on that year's Ed Rec Vol. 3.

In 2009, Sebastian played his first live set as an exclusive performance at the Sónar Festival in Barcelona.

Sebastian produced the single "Difficult" for label-mate Uffie in 2010 on her debut album Sex Dreams and Denim Jeans and provided a remix, titled "Difficult (2006 Parties Remix by SebastiAn)". He also had his experimental track "Threnody" released that year on an Ed Banger Records Christmas compilation.

The same year, he composed the soundtrack for the film Our Day Will Come, directed by Romain Gavras and starring Vincent Cassel. The soundtrack contains also "L'enfance d'un chien" performed by Sébastien Tellier, which features on his first album L'incroyable Vérité, released in 2001.

=== 2011–2013: Total ===
In early 2011, Sebastian provided the track "Enio" for the Ed Banger compilation album Let the Children Techno. Later, his debut album Total was announced, followed by the release of a video for the title track featuring a series of violent and sexual images. A video for Sebastian's new song "Embody" was also released, along with the song's release as a single. The album Total itself was subsequently released on 30 May 2011 in Europe and 7 June 2011 in North America. It was followed by releases of singles "C.T.F.O." and "Love In Motion" from the album. 2011 was also the year of Sebastian's "Primary Tour", a tour visually themed as a political campaign and spanning Europe, Australasia, and North America from August to December. Three remixes done by him were also released that year, including his remix for the Beastie Boys.

2012 saw Sebastian's remixes for bands Nero, The Shoes, Van She, and Woodkid. That year also saw the release of The EP Collection, a box set of vinyl Total singles along with tracks "Organia" and previously unreleased "Holloback". A Sebastian remix of Justice's "New Lands" was released on 25 June 2012.

=== 2013–2019: Production for other artists ===
In 2013, Kavinsky released his first album, OutRun, of which Sebastian produced 9 tracks and mixed the entire album. In February 2014, the album has been awarded to Victoires de la Musique in the category "Electronic/Groove/Dance Album of the Year".

The same year, he composed, produced and arranged the track "Stabat Mater", performed by Woodkid, which features on his album, The Golden Age.

In 2014, Sebastian composed and produced the title track "American Beauty/American Psycho" for the band Fall Out Boy on their album of the same name.

The same year, he composed, produced and mixed Philippe Katerine's album Magnum. It was Katerine who offered to work with him, because he appreciates, as he quoted, the "sexual tension" of his compositions. Sebastian proposed instrumental parts, on which Katerine placed his voice and wrote the texts afterwards. The album released on 7 April 2014 by Barclay.

In 2015, Ed Banger owner Pedro Winter announced that Sebastian had finished producing a few songs for Frank Ocean, allowing him to work on his next album. Sebastian appears on the track "Facebook Story" and has also participated as an instrumentalist on "White Ferrari" and "Godspeed" on Frank Ocean's album, Blonde, released in 2016.

Sebastian and Charlotte Gainsbourg worked together for the album Rest in 2017. Before working with her, he remixed her cover of "Hey Joe", released in 2014. When they first met, he told Gainsbourg that he would like to work with her but that he wanted the project to be done in French, but she refused to do so. A year later, Gainsbourg, after the death of her sister Kate Barry, contacted him again and told him that she would like to express certain things and that she could only say them in French. Thus, they started working on Rest in New York. This album, which he produced and composed, was released on 17 November 2017. Gainsbourg received a Victoire de la Musique in the "Female Artist of the Year" category in 2018 for Rest. The next year, he composed and produced 3 new tracks, which featured on her EP Take 2. In 2019, Gainsbourg appears on Sebastian's second album, Thirst, on the track "Pleasant".

Sebastian created the soundtrack for the Yves Saint Laurent Winter 18 Collection campaign, which was held on 27 February 2018 in Paris, France.

The same year, he co-composed the soundtrack for the film The World Is Yours (original title: Le Monde est à toi), directed by Romain Gavras, starring Karim Leklou, Isabelle Adjani and Vincent Cassel.

=== 2019–present: Thirst ===
In May 2019, SebastiAn released two new tracks, "Thirst" (with his music video directed by Gaspar Noé) and "Run for Me", featuring the American singer Gallant, to promote his new album Thirst. On 9 July 2019, SebastiAn released a third single titled "Beograd". The fourth single "Better Now", featuring Mayer Hawthorne, released on 5 September 2019. The fifth and final single, "Sober", featuring Bakar, released on 8 October 2019. The album released on 8 November 2019 by Ed Banger Records, with, among others, Charlotte Gainsbourg, Sparks, Sevdaliza and Syd as guests.

On 10 September 2020, he released "Hysterias", which is the soundtrack of the Yves Saint-Laurent Men Spring Summer 2021 Collection. SebastiAn contributed a track titled "Don't Tread on Else Matters" to the charity tribute album The Metallica Blacklist, released in September 2021; the track combines remixes of the Metallica songs "Don't Tread on Me" and "Nothing Else Matters".

SebastiAn co-produced "Once", a track by Kid Cudi released on 28 September 2025. Described by Kid Cudi as a letter to his fans, the song marks his announcement to step away from music to focus on his "other dreams".

== Discography ==
- Remixes (2008)
- Total (2011)
- Thirst (2019)

== Tours ==
- Primary Tour (2011 - 2012)
- Thirst Tour (2019)
