= The Rakes =

English post-punk band

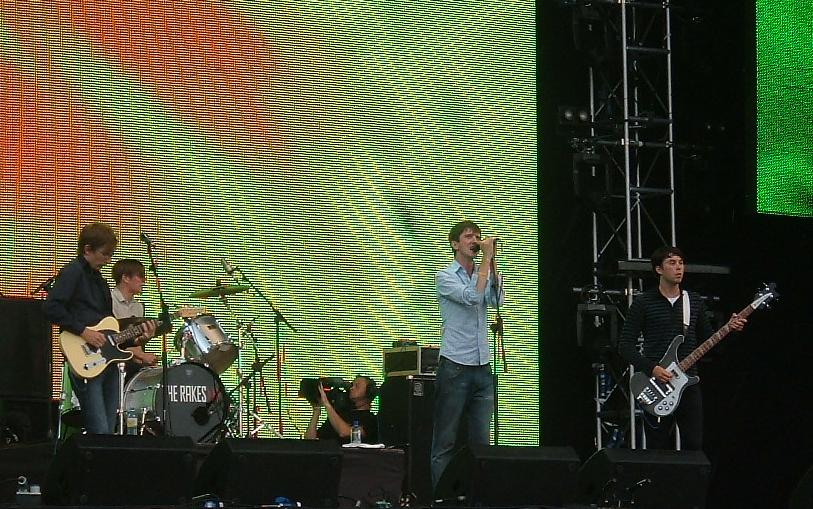
- The Rakes at the Wireless Festival, 2005

Background information
- Origin: London, England
- Genres: Post-rock, art rock, art punk, dance-punk, post-punk revival, noise rock
- Years active: 2003–2009
- Labels: Dim Mak Records, V2 Records
- Members: Alan Donohoe; Jamie Horn-Smith; Lasse Petersen; Matthew Swinnerton
- Past members: Toby Green
- Website: Official website

The Rakes were an English post-punk band formed in London in 2003. Their first album Capture/Release released in 2005, received a nine out of ten review in the NME and was rated 13th best album of the year in the same paper. The band cited in their influences the Specials, Siouxsie and the Banshees and Pulp.

The band disbanded in October 2009, after six years.

== History ==
The Rakes formed in 2002. Their debut album, Capture/Release, spawned the singles "22 Grand Job", "Work, Work, Work (Pub, Club, Sleep)", and "Retreat". Several of their singles appeared in the top 40 of the UK Singles Chart and Capture/Release reached No. 32 on the UK Albums Chart. The final single release from Capture/Release, "All Too Human", was released in the UK on 27 February 2006 and reached their highest chart position (No. 22).

The Rakes supported Franz Ferdinand on their You Could Have It So Much Better... tour during the winter of 2005. They toured the UK throughout January and February 2006, supported by White Rose Movement, Duels, Young Knives, Switches and Klaxons. They also completed their first tour of the UK since the release of Ten New Messages, including their biggest headline concert, a sold-out show at Brixton Academy.

The Rakes' second album, Ten New Messages, was released by V2 Records on 19 March 2007. The album was produced by Jim Abiss (who has also worked with Arctic Monkeys, Editors and Kasabian) and Brendan Lynch (who has worked with Primal Scream). It was recorded in Mayfair Studios in London during the autumn of 2006.

The band's third album, Klang, was released on 23 March 2009. The album was recorded at Karl-Marx-Allee in Berlin in a studio that was the former East German government's centre for radio broadcasts. On 22 October 2009, mere days before they were to begin their UK tour, the Rakes announced that the band was to split with immediate effect: "The Rakes have always been very adamant and proud of the fact that we give 100% to every gig we've ever played. If we can't give it everything then we won't do it. That was the rule we set ourselves from day one".

Drummer Lasse Petersen joined Wolf Gang, which disbanded in 2015.

Donohoe started a new solo project titled the Champagne Campaign and released the video for single "Denis and Margaret" in April 2013 before releasing the single for digital download on 13 May. In September 2015, Donohoe worked for a Brighton-based company as a software developer. During this time, Donohoe told NME: "Being in the Rakes was an insane rollercoaster, but singing the same songs for seven years got boring in the end. And if you're doing something just because you can't imagine an alternative then you're not really living."

== Discography ==
=== Albums ===
- Capture/Release (2005)
- Ten New Messages (2007)
- Klang (2009)

=== EPs ===
- Retreat (2005)
